= List of people killed by Sri Lankan government forces =

The following is a list of notable killings, including terrorists attributed to armed groups under the control of the Sri Lankan government – Army, Navy, Air Force, Police and paramilitary groups (Home Guards/Civil Defence Force, Eelam People's Democratic Party, Tamil Makkal Viduthalai Pulikal etc.).

== Killings in chronological order ==
Victim	Position	Date	Location	District	Province	Method	Perpetrators	Refs
Premawathie Manamperi	Beauty queen	1971	Kataragama	Moneragala	Uva	Shot	Army	
Father George Jeyarajasingham	Methodist priest; human rights activist	13 December 1984		Mannar	Northern	Shot	Army	
Father Mary Bastian	Catholic priest; human rights activist	6 January 1985	Vankalai	Mannar	Northern	Shot	Military	
Vijaya Kumaranatunga	Sri Lanka Mahajana Party leader, actor	16 February 1988	Colombo	Colombo	Western	Shot	Government (Note: Other sources blame Kumaranatunga's assassination on the Janatha Vimukthi Peramuna.)	
Padmasiri Thrimavitharana	Medical student and prominent student activist	22 October 1988	Ratnapura	Ratnapura	Sabaragamuwa	Torture	Paramilitaries; UNP; Susantha Punchinilame	
K. S. Raja	Radio Ceylon journalist	1989	Colombo	Colombo	Western	Shot	EPDP	
Wijedasa Liyanarachchi	Lawyer	2 September 1989	Colombo General Hospital	Colombo	Western	Torture	Police	
Upatissa Gamanayake	Deputy leader of the Janatha Vimukthi Peramuna	November 1989					Security Forces	
Rohana Wijeweera	Leader of the Janatha Vimukthi Peramuna	13 November 1989	Borella, Colombo	Colombo	Western		Security Forces	
Nihal Silva	Comedian and actor	3 December 1989	Dehiwala	Colombo	Western	Shot	Army	
Richard de Zoysa	Author; journalist	18 February 1990	Welikadawatte, Colombo	Colombo	Western	Shot	Police	
Rear Admiral Mohan Jayamaha	Senior naval officer	8 August 1992	Kayts	Jaffna	Northern	Land mine	Army (Note: Other sources blame Jayamaha, Kobbekaduwa and Wimalaratne's assassinations on the Liberation Tigers of Tamil Eelam.)	
Lt. Gen. Denzil Kobbekaduwa	Senior army officer	8 August 1992	Kayts	Jaffna	Northern	Land mine	Army	
Maj. Gen. Vijaya Wimalaratne	Senior army officer	8 August 1992	Kayts	Jaffna	Northern	Land mine	Army	
Lalith Athulathmudali	Former cabinet minister; United National Party Member of Parliament	23 April 1993	Kirulapana, Colombo	Colombo	Western	Shot	Security Forces (Note: Other sources blame Athulathmudali's assassination on the Liberation Tigers of Tamil Eelam.)	
Rohana Kumara	Satana editor	7 September 1999	Pangiriwatte, Colombo	Colombo	Western	Shot	Government	
Nadarajah Atputharajah (alias Ramesh)	Eelam People's Democratic Party Member of Parliament	2 November 1999	Colombo	Colombo	Western	Shot	EPDP	
Vasthian Anthony Mariyadas	Sri Lanka Broadcasting Corporation journalist	31 December 1999	Vavuniya	Vavuniya	Northern	Shot	Security Forces	
Kumar Ponnambalam	Leader of the All Ceylon Tamil Congress	5 January 2000	Colombo	Colombo	Western	Shot	Government	
Mylvaganam Nimalarajan	BBC journalist	19 October 2000	Jaffna	Jaffna	Northern	Shot	EPDP	
Gangai Amaran	Deputy leader of the Sea Tigers	2001	Akkaraayankulam	Kilinochchi	Northern	Claymore mine	Army (LRRP)	
Colonel Nizam	LTTE’s military intelligence leader for the east	14 June 2001	Vaathakkalmadu	Batticaloa	Eastern	Claymore mine	Army (LRRP)	
Major Mano	LTTE’s head of communications for the east	17 September 2001	Paththarakkaddai	Batticaloa	Eastern	Claymore mine	Army (LRRP)	
Colonel Shankar	LTTE’s second in command	26 September 2001	Oddusuddan	Mullaitivu	Northern	Claymore mine	Army (LRRP)	
Aiyathurai Nadesan	Virakesari journalist	31 May 2004	Batticaloa	Batticaloa	Eastern	Shot	TMVP	
A. Chandranehru	Former Tamil National Alliance Member of Parliament	7 February 2005		Batticaloa	Eastern		ENDLF/TMVP	
E. Kousalyan	LTTE's regional political leader	7 February 2005		Batticaloa	Eastern		ENDLF/TMVP	
Taraki Sivaram	TamilNet editor	28 April 2005		Colombo	Western	Shot	PLOTE/TMVP	
Joseph Pararajasingham	Tamil National Alliance Member of Parliament	25 December 2005	Batticaloa	Batticaloa	Eastern	Shot	EPDP/TMVP	
Father Thiruchelvam Nihal Jim Brown	Catholic priest	2006	Allaipiddy	Jaffna	Northern		Navy	
Subramaniyam Sugirdharajan	Sudar Oli journalist	24 January 2006	Trincomalee	Trincomalee	Eastern	Shot	EPDP	
Vanniasingam Vigneswaran	President of the Trincomalee District Tamil Peoples' Forum	7 April 2006	Trincomalee	Trincomalee	Eastern	Shot	TMVP	
Ranjith Kumar	Uthayan journalist	2 May 2006	Jaffna	Jaffna	Northern	Shot	EPDP	
Suresh Kumar	Uthayan journalist	2 May 2006	Jaffna	Jaffna	Northern	Shot	EPDP	
Colonel Ramanan	LTTE’s military leader for Batticaloa District	21 May 2006	Vavunathiv	Batticaloa	Eastern	Shot	Army/TMVP	
Sampath Lakmal de Silva	Sathdina journalist	2 July 2006	Dehiwela	Colombo	Western	Shot	Army	
Pon. Ganeshamoorthy	General Manager of the People's Bank; literary figure; poet	4 August 2006	Kankesanthurai	Jaffna	Northern	Shot	Military intelligence	
S. Sivamaharajah	Former Tamil United Liberation Front Member of Parliament	20 August 2006	Tellippalai	Jaffna	Northern	Shot	EPDP	
Nadarajah Sivakadatcham	Principal of Kopay Christian College	11 October 2006	Jaffna	Jaffna	Northern	Shot	EPDP	
Nadarajah Raviraj	Tamil National Alliance Member of Parliament	10 November 2006	Colombo	Colombo	Western	Shot	EPDP/TMVP	
Chandrabose Suthaharan	Nilam editor	16 April 2007	Thirunavatkulam	Vavuniya	Northern	Shot	Security Forces	
Selvarajah Rajivarnam	Uthayan journalist	29 April 2007	Jaffna	Jaffna	Northern	Shot	EPDP	
Sahadevan Nilakshan	Chaalaram editor	1 August 2007	Kokkuvil	Jaffna	Northern	Shot	Security Forces	
Father Nicholas Pillai Pakiaranjith	Catholic priest; aid worker	26 September 2007	Kalvilaan	Mannar	Northern	Roadside bomb	Army (LRRP)	
S. P. Thamilselvan	LTTE’s political leader	2 November 2007		Kilinochchi	Northern	Air strike	Air Force	
Isaivizhi Chempiyan	Voice of Tigers broadcaster	27 November 2007	Thiruvaiaru	Kilinochchi	Northern	Air strike	Air Force	
T. Maheshwaran	United National Party Member of Parliament	1 January 2008	Colombo	Colombo	Western	Shot	EPDP	
Colonel Charles	LTTE’s military intelligence leader	6 January 2008	Pallamadu	Mannar	Northern	Roadside bomb	Army (LRRP)	
K. Sivanesan	Tamil National Alliance Member of Parliament	6 March 2008	A 9 highway	Mullaitivu	Northern	Roadside bomb	Army (LRRP)	
Father M. X. Karunaratnam	North East Secretariat on Human Rights (NESoHR)	20 April 2008	Mannankulam			Claymore mine	Army (LRRP)	
P. Devakumaran	Shakthi TV journalist	28 May 2008	Navanthurai	Jaffna	Northern	Hacked to death	EPDP	
N. Nanthakumar	Divisional Secretary for Thunukkai	29 June 2008	Mullaitivu	Mullaitivu	Northern	Claymore mine	Army (LRRP)	
Lasantha Wickramatunge	The Sunday Leader editor	8 January 2009	Colombo	Colombo	Western	Shot	Government	
Puniyamoorthy Sathiyamoorthy	Freelance journalist	12 February 2009	Theavipuram	Mullaitivu	Northern	Artillery	Army	
Isaipriya	O'liveechchu broadcaster	18 May 2009	Mullivaikkal	Mullaitivu	Northern	Shot	Army	
