= List of Sri Lankan activists =

The following is a list of Sri Lankan activists.

== A ==
- Anagarika Dharmapala
- Sunila Abeysekera
- Caroline Anthonypillai
- A. T. Ariyaratne

== B ==
- Mary Bastian
- Mark Anthony Bracegirdle
- Thiruchelvam Nihal Jim Brown

== C ==
- Radhika Coomaraswamy
- Charles Edgar Corea

== D ==
- Sampath Lakmal de Silva
- Colvin R. de Silva
- William de Silva
- P. Devakumaran
- A. P. de Zoysa
- Richard de Zoysa
- Francis de Zoysa
- Arthur V. Dias

== F ==
- Chandra Fernando
- Nimalka Fernando
- Basil Fernando
- Frank Marcus Fernando
- Gratien Fernando
- Rosanna Flamer-Caldera

== G ==
- Vivienne Goonewardena
- Philip Gunawardena

== H ==
- Rajan Hoole
- Ratnajeevan Hoole
- Walisinghe Harischandra
- Charles Alwis Hewavitharana
- Edmund Hewavitarne
- Don Carolis Hewavitharana

== I ==
- Indrani Iriyagolla

== J ==
- Dandeniya Gamage Jayanthi
- Kumari Jayawardena
- George Jeyarajasingham

== K ==
- Suresh Kumar and Ranjith Kumar incident

== L ==
- Kethesh Loganathan

== M ==
- Arunachalam Mahadeva
- T. Maheswaran
- Viraj Mendis

== N ==
- Ariyanayagam Chandra Nehru

== P ==
- Nicholas Pillai Pakiaranjith
- Tikiri Bandara Panabokke
- Joseph Pararajasingham
- Daya Pathirana
- Ajith C. S. Perera
- Kumar Ponnambalam

== R ==
- Nadarajah Raviraj

== S ==
- Sinnathamby Sivamaharajah
- K. Sivanesan
- Taraki Sivaram
- Kopalasingham Sritharan
- Subramaniyam Sugirdharajan
- Chandrabose Suthaharan

== T ==
- Rajini Thiranagama
- Chelvy Thiyagarajah
- Neelan Tiruchelvam

== V ==
- Maheswary Velautham
- Samantha Vithanage
- Lasantha Wickrematunge
- Edwin Wijeyeratne

== See also ==
- Sri Lankan independence activist
