= M. X. Karunaratnam =

Sri Lankan activist (1951–2008)

Rev Father M. X. Karunaratnam
- Father Killi
- Born: April 12, 1951; Jaffna, Sri Lanka
- Died: April 20, 2008 (aged 57); Vanni Sri Lanka
- Occupations: Parish Priest, Human Rights activist and Chairperson of NESOHR

Reverend Father Mariampillai Xavier Karunaratnam was a minority Sri Lankan Tamil, Roman Catholic parish priest and a human rights activist. He was the Chairperson of the NESOHR and was killed on 20 April 2008 allegedly by a Deep Penetration Unit of the Sri Lankan Army . In a press release, NESOHR condemned, "in the strongest possible terms", the Sri Lankan state for the assassination of Rev.Fr. Karunaratnam.

== Biography ==
Karunaratnam was born on 20 April 1951 in Karaveddy, in the Vadamarachchi region of northern Sri Lanka. He was the fourth of ten children in a family of teachers. He was educated at Karaveddy Vigneswara College, Sacred Heart College, and St. Patrick's College. He was an officer with the Bank of Ceylon before he was ordained as a priest in 1989.

During his youth, he participated in student and youth activities associated with the Tamil United Liberation Front. Before entering the priesthood, he worked as an English teacher and was known locally as “Kili Vathiyar” (Teacher Kili). He was also involved in mediation and community relief activities.Father Karunaratnam was founder and Chairman of NESOHR. He was also the Chairman of NGO Consortium of Jaffna. He was engaged in relief work for war displaced and worked in the tsunami relief.

== Background ==
M. X. Karunaratnam was a priest of the Jaffna Diocese and served in the Vanni region of Sri Lanka and worked from the LTTE controlled parts of Sri Lanka. He worked for human rights and called on the United Nations and foreign human rights organisation to monitor the human rights situation in Sri Lanka . Earlier two other NESHOR members and Tamil National Alliance MPs A. Chandranehru and Joseph Pararajasingham were killed. He was extremely critical of the Sri Lankan government.

== Religious vocation ==
In the early 1980s, amid escalating ethnic conflict, Karunaratnam left a career in banking and entered the Catholic seminary. On 20 April 1985, he survived a shooting incident in Urumapirai, Jaffna.

He was ordained a priest on 25 September 1989 by Thomas Savundaranayagam Deogupillai.

== Ministry and social engagement ==
Karunaratnam served in several parishes in northern Sri Lanka and became known for his work among war-affected civilians. From 1996 to 2002, he served as parish priest in Mallavi and chaired the Vanni Citizens’ Committee.

Following the 2004 Indian Ocean tsunami, he participated in relief and rehabilitation efforts in the north and east.

He was known for promoting dialogue between Tamil and Sinhalese communities and maintained relationships with clergy, activists, and intellectuals across ethnic lines. He advocated reconciliation, human rights, and the protection of civilians affected by conflict.

== Human rights advocacy ==
In 2002, Karunaratnam co-founded the North East Secretariat on Human Rights, which documented human rights violations, including disappearances and civilian killings during the Sri Lankan civil war.

His engagement with the Liberation Tigers of Tamil Eelam has been described as part of his efforts to advocate for civilian protection in areas under de facto rebel administration. He also publicly opposed the recruitment of children into armed groups.

== Death ==
Karunaratnam was killed on 20 April 2008, his 57th birthday, when the vehicle in which he was traveling struck a claymore mine on the Mallavi–Vavunikkulam road in northern Sri Lanka.

His death occurred amid heightened violence and attacks on humanitarian and human rights workers during the final stages of the Sri Lankan civil war. Responsibility for the attack has been disputed.

== Legacy ==
Karunaratnam is remembered by many in northern Sri Lanka as a priest committed to peace, justice, and solidarity with war-affected communities. His funeral at St. Theresa's Church was attended by thousands.

He is often referred to as “Father Kili” and is regarded by supporters as a symbol of moral courage and intercommunal reconciliation.

== Incident ==
He was killed in the Mallaavi-Vavunikku'lam Road in Vanni after he was returning from a Sunday mass and going to a remembrance ceremony for a Tamil National Alliance a pro LTTE party MP Kiddinan Sivanesan who was also killed in a similar fashion. He was killed by a claymore mine blast carried out allegedly by a Deep Penetration Unit (DPU) of the Sri Lanka Army. LTTE military spokesman Rasiah Ilanthiraiyan stated that "He was targeted by the (government's Deep Penetration Unit) DPU while he was returning to his residence after attending to mass at Mankulam parish,". The Sri Lanka Army denied responsibility for the attack, with its Spokesman Brigadier Udaya Nanayakkara stating "That area is under LTTE control, We do not operate that deep in to LTTE control area. We can't take any responsibility,".

== Reaction ==
Rev Fr. Damian Fernando, National Director of Caritas Sri Lanka, said:

"He was an example of courage, strength and humanity and will be missed by all.He also showed endless empathy towards refugees and displaced people while working tirelessly to improve their living standards.

National Peace Council of Sri Lanka has called his death

"A Lamentable Loss to Civil Society and to the Country

Tamil National Alliance in a press statement said

" "We deeply mourn the loss of Rev Father Karunaratnam who indefatigably served the legitimate interests of the Tamil Civilian population in the Vanni."

== See also ==
Other notable people killed during the Sri Lankan civil war

- Joseph Pararajasingham
- K. Sivanesan
- Ariyanayagam Chandra Nehru

Other notable clergy killed during the Sri Lankan civil war

- Mary Bastian
- Chandra Fernando
- George Jeyarajasingham
- Eugene John Hebert
- Thiruchelvam Nihal Jim Brown
- Nicholas Pillai Pakiaranjith
- Mariampillai Sarathjeevan
