= Vankalai massacre =

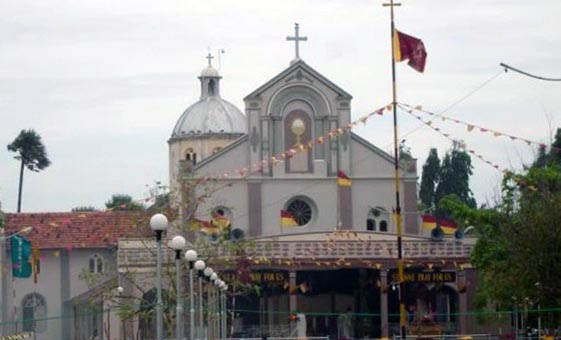
- Our Lady of St. Anne's Church in Vankalai
- Location: Vankalai, Mannar district, Sri Lanka
- Date: June 8, 2006 (+6 GMT)
- Target: Sri Lankan Tamil civilians
- Attack type: Torture, Strangulation
- Weapon: Guns
- Deaths: 4
- Perpetrator: 'Sri Lankan Army

The Vankalai massacre was a massacre of a family of four minority Sri Lankan Tamils at the hands of the Sri Lankan military personnel from the village of Vankalai in Mannar District, Sri Lanka on June 8, 2006. The victims were tortured and the mother was gang raped before her murder.

== Background ==
The village of Vankalai is located about six miles southeast of the town of Mannar, in Mannar District. The village was the scene of numerous incidents during the Sri Lankan Civil War, including the killing of Catholic priest Mary Bastian in 1985. As a result of the violence and insecurity, many residents were internally displaced or became overseas refugees.

Some former residents returned to the area following the 2002 ceasefire between the LTTE and the government. Among them was the Martin family – carpenter Moorthy Martin, 27-year-old Mary Madeleine (known as Chitra), formerly a teacher with the Jesuit Refugee Service in Tamil Nadu, and their nine-year-old daughter Lakshika and seven-year-old son Dilakshan – who returned to Vankalai from southern India.

== Incident ==
The Martin family lived in the Thomaspuri ward of Vankalai, named after Cardinal Thomas Cooray. According to local residents, security forces visited several houses in the area on the morning of June 8, 2006, including three soldiers who visited the Martins' home.

At night, when residents of Thomaspuri and neighbouring Bastipuri – named after Mary Bastian – gathered at Our Lady of St. Anne's Church for safe refuge, as had become customary following shelling of the area by security forces at the start of June, the four members of the Martin family were absent. When relatives and neighbours checked on the house the following morning, they found the family dead.

The bodies of the victims had been mutilated and bore signs of torture, carrying wounds inflicted by carpenter's tools and "heavier and sharper weapons like knives or bayonets". All four had been hacked and stabbed, those of Moorthy Martin and the two children had been hanged with ropes, and that of Mary Martin showed signs of having been sexually assaulted.

== Reactions ==
In the wake of the massacre, the pro-rebel news site TamilNet reported that residents of Thomaspuri, and nearby Bastipuri and Sukanthapuri, had begun to flee. Victor Avithappar, the Parish Priest of Vankalai, stated:

"People are panicked and afraid, they don't feel safe. They want peace, to live free from fear."

Funeral of the massacre victims

The Requiem Mass for the family, held on June 10 at St. Anne's Church in Vankalai, gathered around five thousand people and was headed by Joseph Rayappu, the Bishop of Mannar.

Although there are no known witnesses to the killings, many local residents allege that they were carried out by members of the security forces. According to the LTTE, local villagers "speculated that the murder of the family could have been sexually motivated". TamilNet, which published graphic photographs of the four victims that were reprinted by sectors of the Sri Lankan media, explicitly attributed the massacre to soldiers of the Sri Lankan Army.

Sri Lankan government officials denied allegations that the military was involved in the massacre and blamed the LTTE, suggesting that the family was targeted due to its connections with security forces and in a bid to generate "international sympathy" for the group "by tarnishing the image of the security forces". The government also alleged that Moorthy Martin had previously received several threats from the LTTE. An LTTE spokesperson denied the accusations.

An inquest into the massacre was initiated by local judicial authorities.

== See also ==
- List of attacks attributed to the Sri Lankan military
- Allaipiddy massacre
- Muttur massacre
- 2006 Trincomalee massacre
