= 1984 Mannar massacre =

1984 mass killing of Tamil civilians by Sri Lankan Army soldiers in Mannar, Sri Lanka

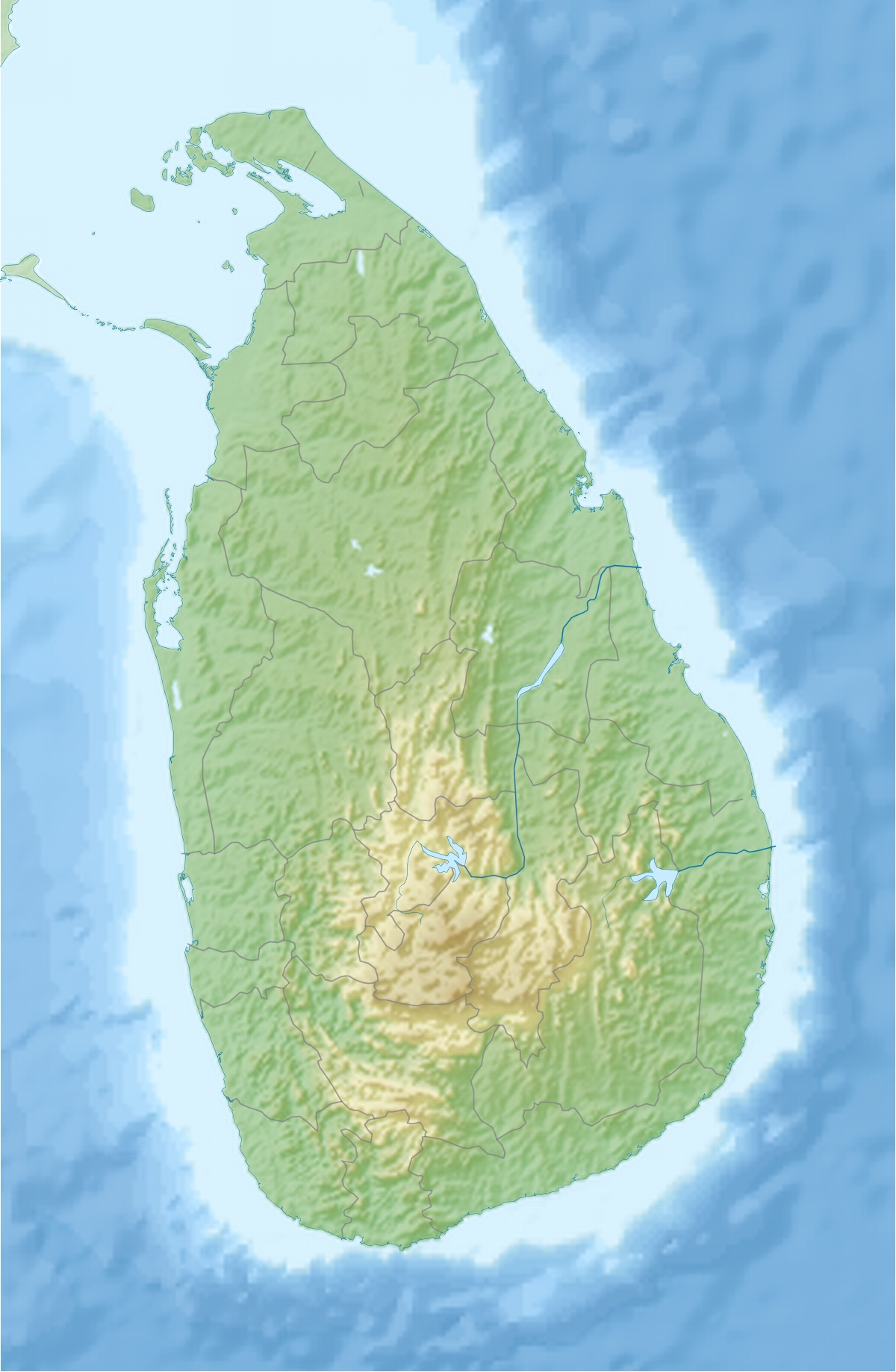
- Location: 8°57′58″N 79°52′59″E; Mannar, Sri Lanka
- Date: December 4, 1984 (+6 GMT)
- Target: Sri Lankan Tamils
- Attack type: Shooting
- Weapon: Guns
- Deaths: 200+
- Injuries: Unknown
- Perpetrator: Sri Lankan Army

The 1984 Mannar massacre was the killing of 200+ minority Sri Lankan Tamils civilians by Sri Lankan Army soldiers in the town of Mannar, north-western Sri Lanka, on December 4, 1984. The attack was triggered when three Army jeeps hit a land mine, killing one soldier. In retaliation, landmarks such as the Central hospital, the post office, a Roman Catholic convent as well as villagers working in rice paddy fields and bus passengers were attacked. Villages around Mannar town such as Murunkan and Parappankadal were also attacked. Immediately after the incident, the then Sri Lankan President J. R. Jayawardene appointed a Presidential commission of inquiry. A local Roman Catholic priest, Mary Bastian who was a member of the Presidential commission was later killed in January 1985. A Methodist minister George Jeyarajasingham, who was a witness to the incident, was also killed in December 1984.

== Background information ==
By 1956, 50% of clerical jobs were held by Tamils, although they were a minority of the country's population. This was partly a result of the Western education provided by American missionaries in the Tamil dominated Jaffna Peninsula. In order to win support amongst the majority Sinhalese people populist politicians initiated measures aimed at reducing the over representation of Tamils in the civil service and science based courses such as the Sinhala Only Act and the Policy of standardisation. These measures, as well as riots and pogroms that targeted the Sri Lankan Tamils, led to the formation of a number of rebel groups advocating independence for Sri Lankan Tamils. Following the 1983 Black July pogrom full scale civil war erupted between the government and the rebel groups.

== The incident ==
On December 4, 1984, three Sri Lankan Army jeeps hit a land mine, killing one soldier and wounding eleven others. In retaliation, about thirty (30) soldiers went on a rampage, attacking public buildings and civilians in and around Mannar.

The soldiers attacked the central hospital; stopped vehicles and shot and killed the occupants; shot 15 employees of the post office by lining them up and shooting them, killing eight; opened fire on peasants in fields; and attacked a convent, stripping the nuns of watches, gold crucifixes and chains. Another group of soldiers stopped a bus and shot all the male passengers. A bus travelling in the opposite direction was also stopped and twenty of its passengers were shot dead. Off the main road, an army jeep drove into the village of Parappankadal. The soldiers fired indiscriminately, killing 12 of people including a mother nursing her infant child. The child survived but three of its toes were blown away by the bullet that killed its mother. Murunkan was another village affected the incident.

By the end, more than 200 people were killed; another 20 were missing, mostly young male Tamils taken to army camps. It took three days to transport all the bodies.

== Investigations ==
The then Sri Lankan President J.R. Jayawardene instituted a Presidential Commission of Inquiry to investigate the incident. Although many locals were reluctant to participate in the investigation, Mary Bastian, a Roman Catholic priest, participated in the investigation.

Rev Jeyarajasingham, a Methodist priest, was another the focal point of Human Rights activism on behalf of the local people He was also the local contact for the Sri Lankan government appointed presidential committee to investigate Human Rights violations in the Mannar district. Rev. Jeyarajasingham was shot dead on December 13, 1984, when he was travelling in his vehicle. Later his body was burnt along with his vehicle. Rev Fr Mary Bastian collected the remains of victims including Rev Jeyarajasingham and handed them to the Jeevothayam Methodist Centre. Rev Fr Mary Bastian was himself killed on January 6, 1985, allegedly by the military.

== See also ==
- List of attacks on civilians attributed to Sri Lankan government forces
