= Sivanesan =

Sivanesan is a surname and a given name. Notable people with the name include:

Given name:

- Sivanesan Achalingam (born 1956), Malaysian politician

Surname:

- Kandiah Sivanesan, Sri Lankan Tamil politician and provincial minister
- Kiddinan Sivanesan (1957–2008), Sri Lankan Tamil politician and former Member of Parliament
- S. Sivanesan (born 1990), Malaysian footballer
- Thillaiyampalam Sivanesan (1963–2009), aka Colonel Soosai, head of the Sea Tigers, the naval wing of the Liberation Tigers of Tamil Eelam

== See also ==
- K. Sivanesan (disambiguation)
