= MXK =

MXK or mxk may refer to:

- Postal code for Marsaxlokk, Malta
- ISO 639-3 code for the Monumbo language, a Papuan language in Papua New Guinea
- M. X. Karunaratnam (1951–2008), Sri Lankan Tamil activist and Roman Catholic priest
