= Mariampillai Sarathjeevan =

Sri Lankan Catholic priest

Mariampillai Thaddeus Sarathjeevan (May 13, 1968 – May 18, 2009) was a Catholic priest from Jaffna, Sri Lanka. He was one of the few priests who remained with the refugees until the end of war in northern parts of Sri Lanka. He died while he was leading the last batch of refugees to safety from the war zone. He was 41 years old and in good health.

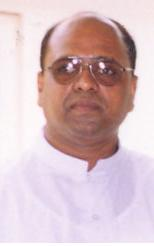
Picture of late Rev. Fr. Sarathjeevan

Rev. Fr. Sarathjeevan, known as "Father Sara", was the coordinator of Jesuit Refugee Service for Kilinochchi district in Sri Lanka. He refused to abandon the refugees, including orphan children, when other volunteers and international organizations left the war zone because of the severity of the war. He and his people did not have food or water for three days, until he was able to bring them to safety. They all had to stay underground in a bunker. In recognition of his service and heroic death, the Jesuit Refugee Service established Sara Project in his name.

== Early life and education ==
Father Sara was born in a small village called Bogawanthalawa in Sri Lanka on May 13, 1968. His parents Mr. and Mrs. Mariampillai were teachers from Jaffna, Sri Lanka. Bogawanthalawa is within the beautiful tea estates of Sri Lanka and has a cold climate. Soon after he was born in this cold climate, his father became an asthmatic person. Therefore, his parents transferred to Kaddukaran-kudiyiruppu, - a small village in Thalaimannar with 13 families and an ancient St. James Church. This region is one of the hottest in Sri Lanka. In this deserted village with white sands and Palmyra trees, Fr. Sara spent his early childhood until 1973. Then his family moved to Jaffna - their hometown.

Father Sara had his primary and high school education at St. Patrick's College, Jaffna. He joined the Cub Scouts and then the Boy Scouts in his school days. St. Patrick's College is one of the most prestigious Catholic schools in Sri Lanka. All seminarians of the Catholic church study at St. Patrick's College. After graduating from high school and a technical college in Jaffna, he answered the call to serve his people and church by entering St. Martin's Seminary on March 1, 1993. After studying at St. Martin's Seminary, from September 1994 to November 2002, Father Sara studied philosophy and theology at St. Francis Xavier's Seminary in Jaffna.

== Priesthood ==
The Bishop of Jaffna appointed Father Sara as Deacon of St. Antony's Church in Passaiyoor, Jaffna. This church is a local pilgrim site. Passiyoor is a fishing hamlet in Jaffna. After serving the people of Passiyoor and St. Hendry's College in Illavalai, he was ordained to the priesthood at St. Mary's Cathedral, Jaffna on 14 May 2003. Father Sara grew up around the Cathedral. He was an altar-boy and a member of choir of the Cathedral.

After serving at various churches, the Bishop of Jaffna appointed him in December 2003 as Assistant Parish Priest to St. Peter's church in Mullaitheevu. This was one of the churches destroyed in December 26, 2004 Indian Ocean earthquake and tsunami. Father Sara lost around 70 of his parishioners, and all his belongings in this tsunami. He would not have thought that he would come back to this region, another day, to die with his people in war.

In March 2005 he was transferred to St. Fatima's church, Uruthirapuram in Kilinochchi, which was the capital of Liberation Tigers of Tamil Eelam - an opposition armed force in Sri Lanka at that time. Because of an intense Sri Lankan civil war - in which the United Nations said several thousands of people died - Father Sara and all his congregation were displaced continuously, until he died on May 18, 2009. At the time of his death, he and his people had not had food or water for several days. Father Sara was one of the 8 priests who remained with the displaced people because all other humanitarians - including the International Committee of the Red Cross and the United Nations High Commissioner for Refugees - left the region for their own safety.

== Memorials ==
A statue was unveiled in his memory during his first year memorial service on 18 May 2010.

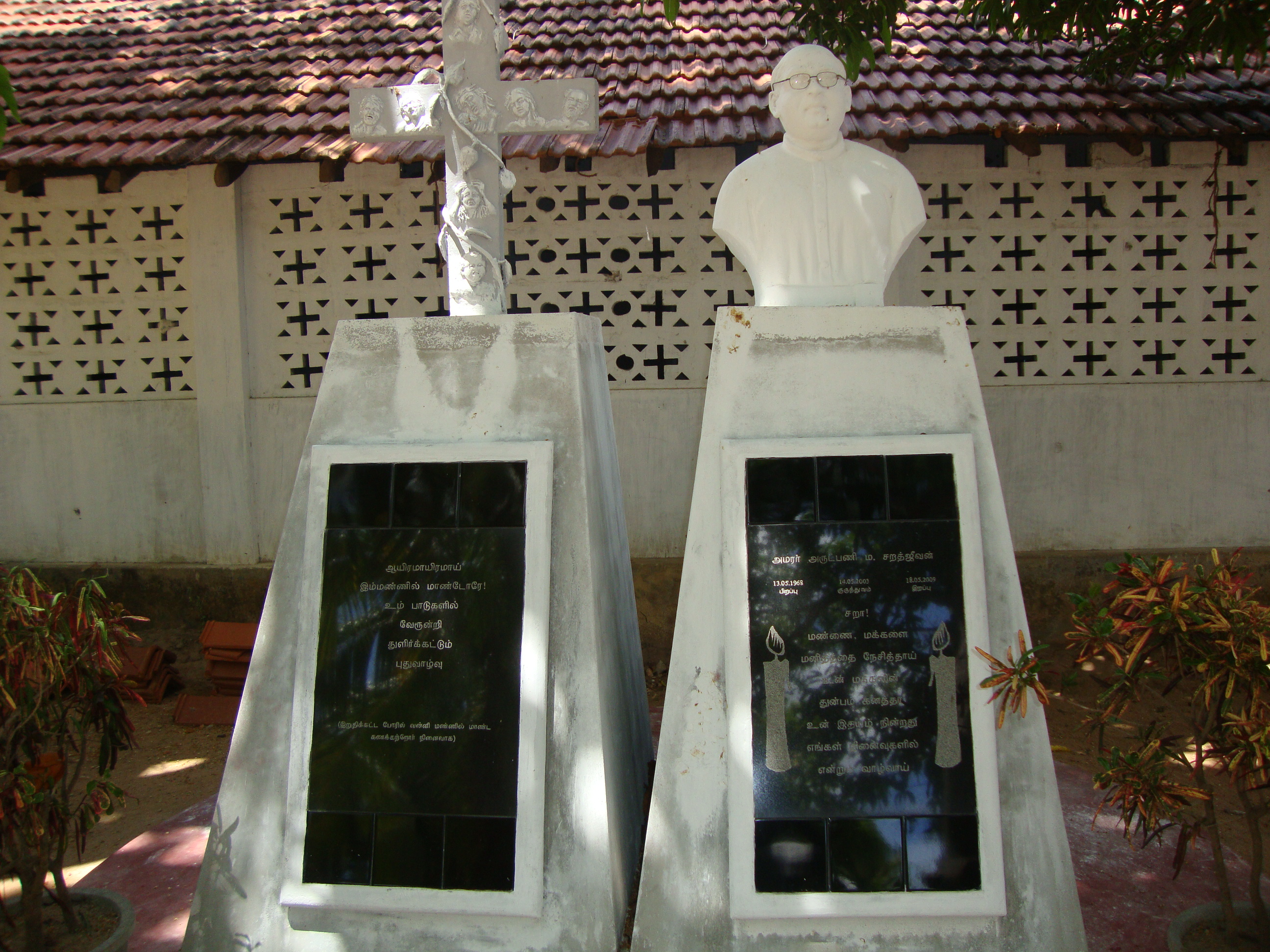
Statue of late Rev. Fr. Sarathjeevan who died in Sri Lankan war zone along with refugees whom he was helping.

Rev. Fr. Yavis, director of HUDEC-Caritas Vanni, built a preschool and dedicated to Rev. Fr. Sarathjeevan on July 31, 2012.

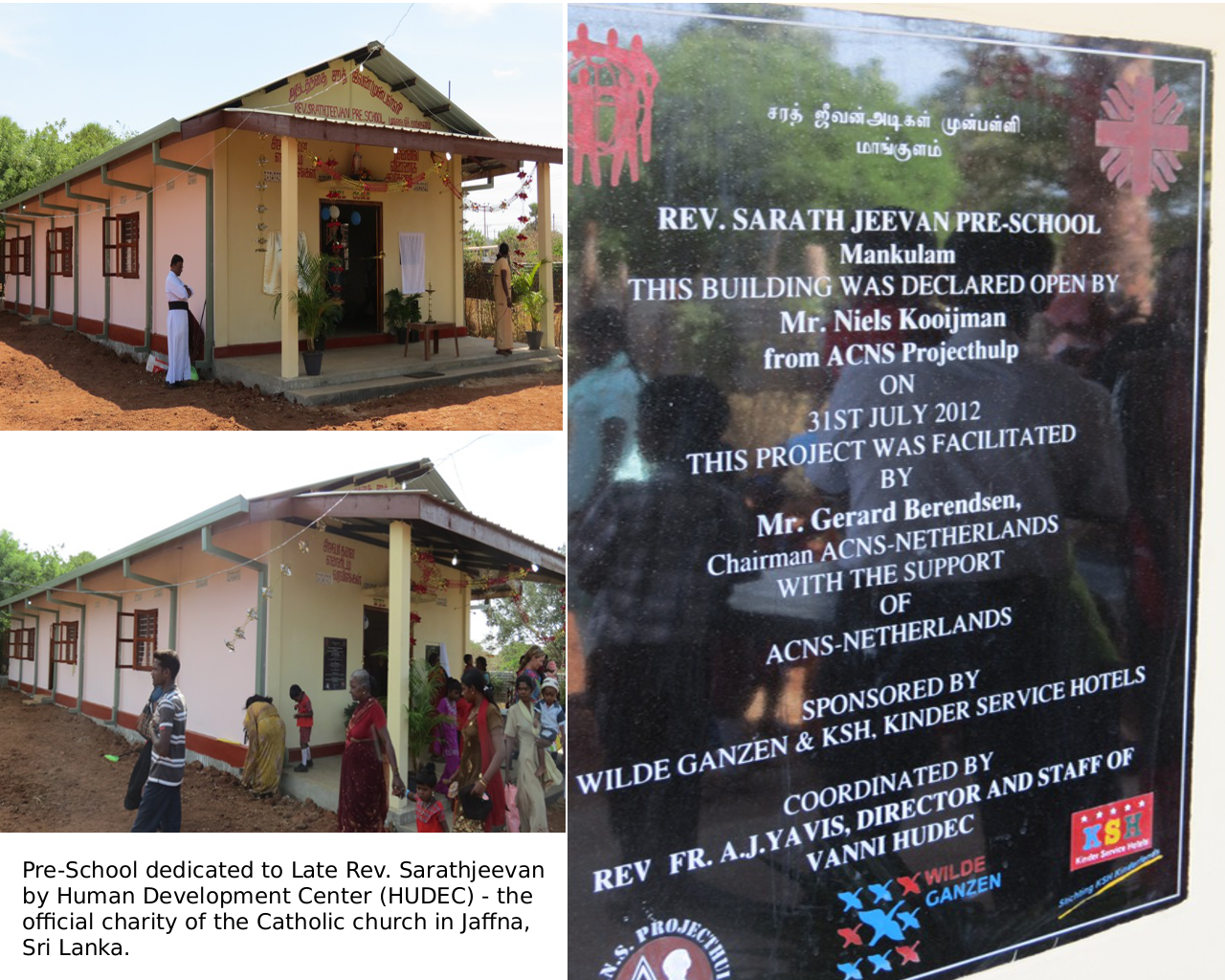
This preschool was built by Human Development Center (HUDEC) of Jaffna Diocese of the Catholic Church in Sri Lanka. It was dedicated to Rev. Fr. Sarathjeevan who died in Sri Lankan civil war with his people.

A charitable organization named Fr.Sarathjeevan Foundation was established in 2013 by the family members of the late Rev. Fr. Sarathjeevan with the patronage of the Bishop of Jaffna Diocese, and managed by a board of five members. Fr.Sarathjeevan Foundation provides financial support for children's education, housing, basic needs such as toilets and medical assistance for families affected by the civil war.

== See also ==
Other notable clergy killed during the Sri Lankan civil war

- Mary Bastian
- Chandra Fernando
- George Jeyarajasingham
- Eugene John Hebert
- Thiruchelvam Nihal Jim Brown
- Nicholas Pillai Pakiaranjith
- M. X. Karunaratnam
