= A Fleeting Moment in My Country =

2012 book by N. Malathy

- Book cover, first edition
- Author: N. Malathy
- Language: English
- Publisher: Clarity Press
- Publication date: 17 August 2012
- ISBN: 978-0984525546

A Fleeting Moment in My Country: The Last Years of the LTTE De-Facto State is a book by Dr N. Malathy who did her PhD in the University of Canterbury in New Zealand. She spent four years from 2005 till 2009 in the then rebel LTTE administered Vanni de facto state as the secretary of the North East Secretariat on Human Rights and worked closely with the LTTE Peace Secretariat to assist with the peace process. The book deals with experiences of her work in a human rights body, a women's organization, and an orphanage. The life in the rebel held areas and brutal end to the Sri Lankan Civil War in which thousands of Tamils died.
