= K. Sivanesan =

K. Sivanesan may refer to:

- Kiddinan Sivanesan (1957–2008), Sri Lankan member of parliament for Jaffna District
- Kandiah Sivanesan, Sri Lankan provincial councillor for Mullaitivu District
