= Eachchamoddai Grama Niladhari Division =

Eachchamoddai
- Grama Niladhari Division
- Interactive map of Eachchamoddai
- Coordinates: 9.652395°N 80.032257°E
- Country: Sri Lanka
- Province: Northern Province
- District: Jaffna District
- Divisional Secretariat: Jaffna Divisional Secretariat
- Electoral District: Jaffna Electoral District
- Polling Division: Jaffna Polling Division

Area
  - Total: 0.79 km^{2} (0.31 sq mi)
- Elevation: 9 m (30 ft)

Population (2012)
  - Total: 2,823
  - Density: 3,573/km^{2} (9,250/sq mi)
- ISO 3166 code: LK-4136030

Eachchamoddai

Eachchamoddai Grama Niladhari Division is a Grama Niladhari Division of the Jaffna Divisional Secretariat of Jaffna District of Northern Province, Sri Lanka . It has Grama Niladhari Division Code J/66.

Vannankulam, Jaffna, Passaiyoor, Chundikuli Girls' College, Gurunagar, Chundikuli, Old Park and St. John's College, Jaffna are located within, nearby or associated with Eachchamoddai.

Eachchamoddai is a surrounded by the Passaiyoor West, Chundikuli South, Columbuthurai West, Columbuthurai West, Ariyalai S. W. (East), Passaiyoor East, Thirunagar and Chundikuli North Grama Niladhari Divisions.

== Demographics ==
=== Ethnicity ===
The Eachchamoddai Grama Niladhari Division has a Sri Lankan Tamil majority (98.7%) . In comparison, the Jaffna Divisional Secretariat (which contains the Eachchamoddai Grama Niladhari Division) has a Sri Lankan Tamil majority (95.6%)

Ethnicity in Eachchamoddai
1. Sri Lankan Tamil (98.7%)
2. Other (1.30%)

=== Religion ===
The Eachchamoddai Grama Niladhari Division has a Roman Catholic majority (53.7%) and a significant Hindu population (38.6%) . In comparison, the Jaffna Divisional Secretariat (which contains the Eachchamoddai Grama Niladhari Division) has a Roman Catholic majority (52.9%) and a significant Hindu population (37.7%)

Religion in Eachchamoddai
1. Roman Catholic (53.7%)
2. Hindu (38.6%)
3. Other Christian (7.10%)
4. Other (0.60%)

== Gallery ==
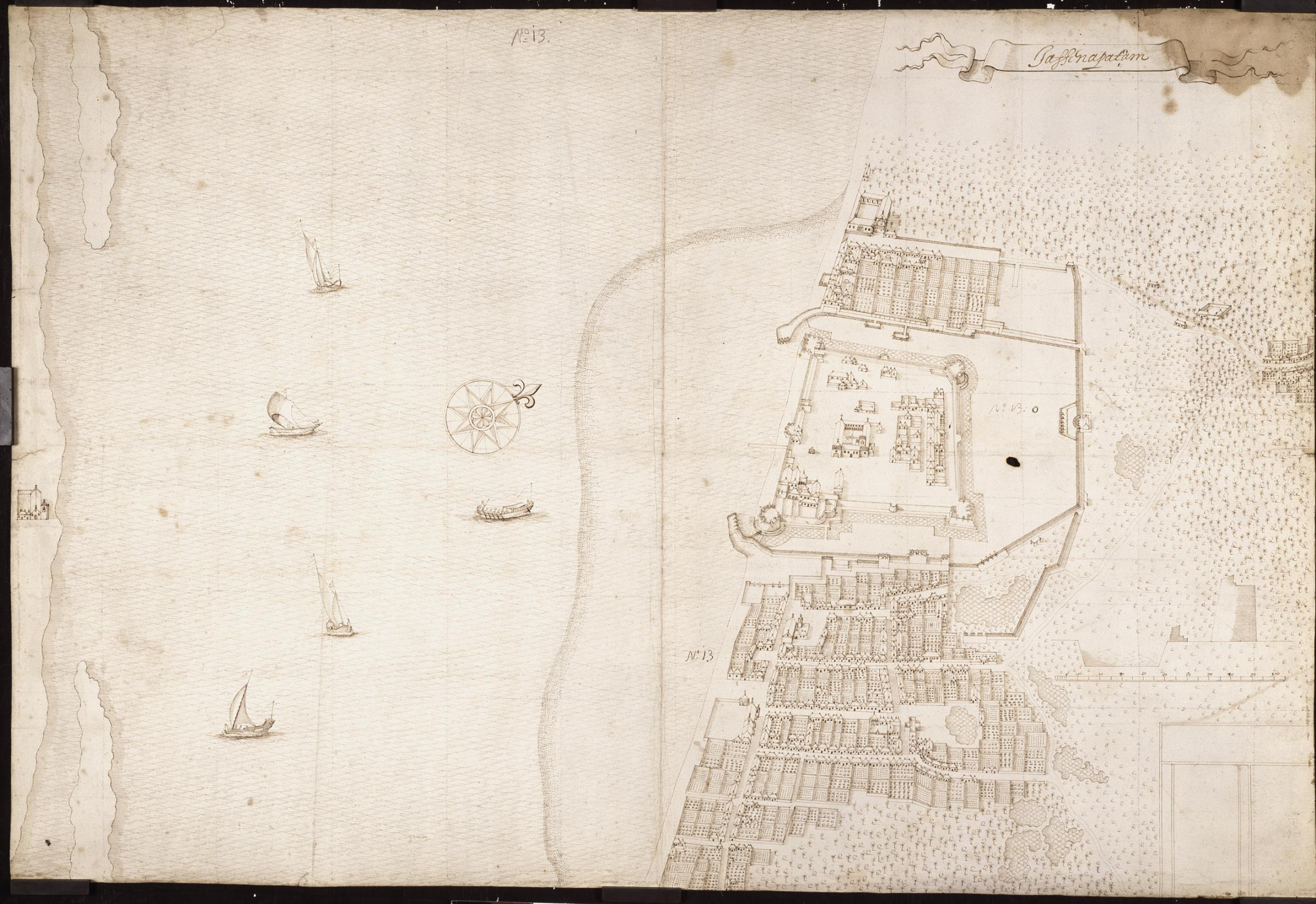
Gurunagar

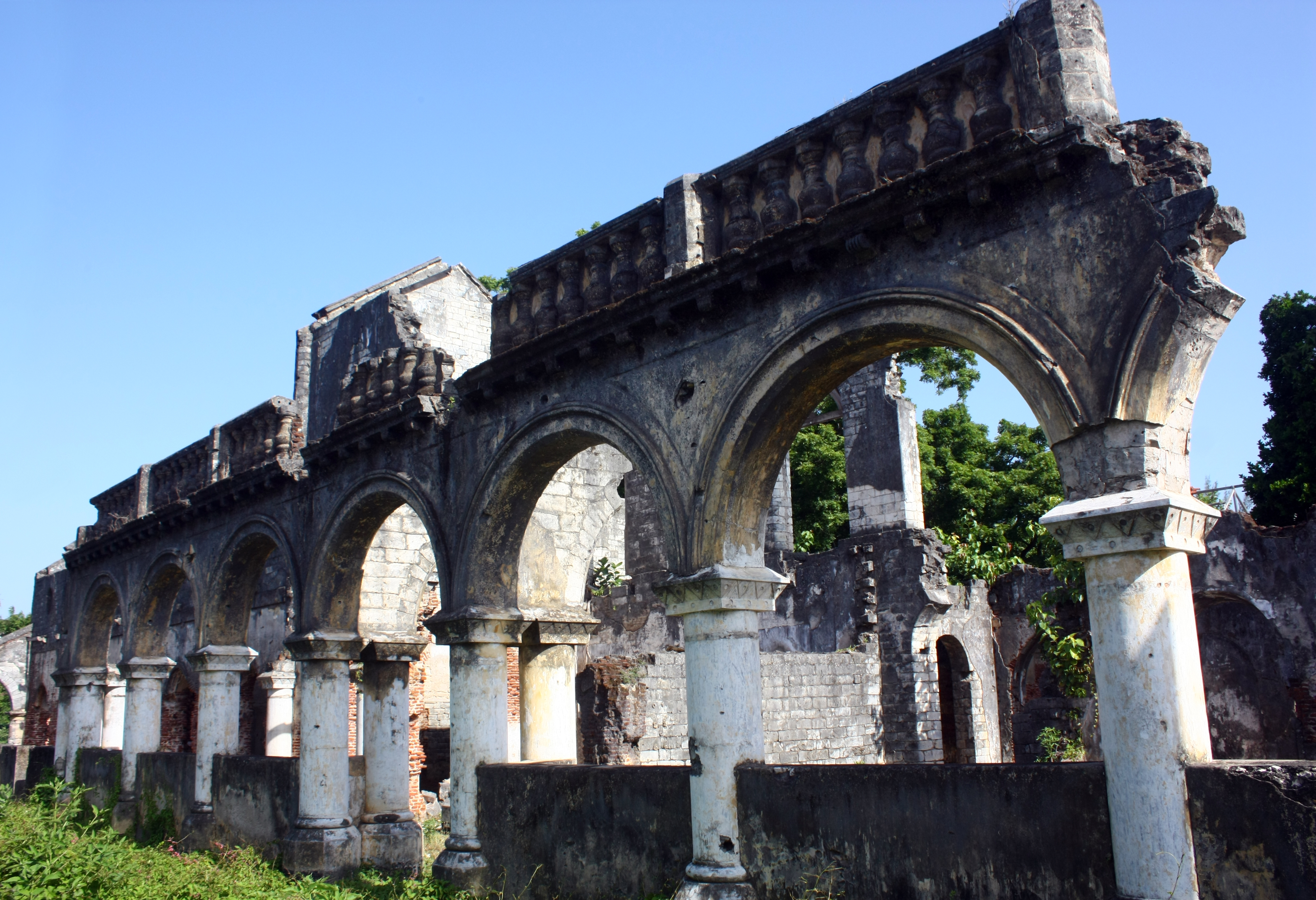
Old Park

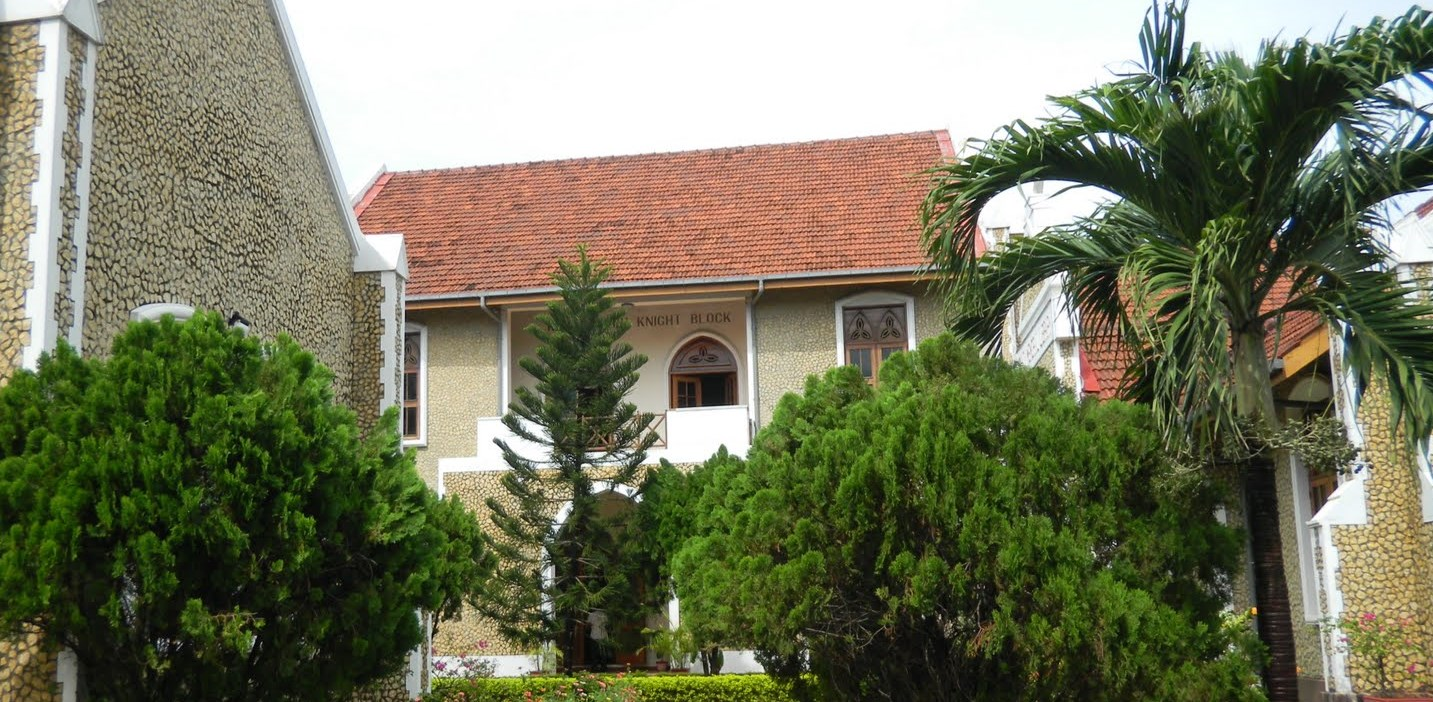
St. John's College, Jaffna
