= Nicholas Pillai Pakiaranjith =

Sri Lankan priest (1967–2007)

- Born: June 11, 1967; Eachchamoddai, Jaffna, Sri Lanka
- Died: September 26, 2007 (aged 40); Mannar Sri Lanka
- Occupation: Parish Priest

Nicholas Pillai Pakiaranjith was a minority Sri Lankan Tamil, Roman Catholic parish priest and aid worker. He was killed on 26 September 2008 by a Deep Penetration Unit of the Sri Lankan Army.

== Biography ==
Nicholas Pillai was born in Jaffna and joined the Mannar diocese and was ordained as a Jesuit priest on December 17, 1997. He was also the District Coordinator of Mannar for the Jesuit Refugee Service which helped and worked with war displaced Tamils. His death was part of a series of killing of Tamil human rights workers.

== Death ==
Nicholas Pillai was on a humanitarian mission to provide aid to displaced Tamils when his van was hit by a claymore mine on Kalvi'laan on Maangkulam - Vellaangkulam road in Mannar while he was on his way to Vidaththaltheevu.

== See also ==
- Mary Bastian
- Chandra Fernando
- George Jeyarajasingham
- Mariampillai Sarathjeevan
- Thiruchelvam Nihal Jim Brown
- Eugene John Hebert
- M. X. Karunaratnam
