= North East Secretariat on Human Rights =

The North-East Secretariat on Human Rights (NESoHR) was established on July 9, 2004, in Kilinochchi by the Liberation Tigers of Tamil Eelam (LTTE) as part of the 2002 Norway-facilitated peace process to monitor human rights in the North Eastern Province, Sri Lanka. According to its former secretary N. Malathy, who volunteered and worked closely with the LTTE Peace Secretariat to assist with the peace process, some leading members of citizens' committees in the North-East collectively put pressure on the LTTE to establish a civilian human rights body independent of the LTTE Peace Secretariat.

According to pro-rebel TamilNet, NESoHR functioned in the Tamil areas until the end of 2008 when it was forced to end its operations. During its operations from Vanni, it released a large number of reports on the ongoing atrocities against Tamils. Amnesty International claimed in 2006 that NESoHR had "limited autonomy, and capacity and security constraints" that restricted its access to the Eastern Province, Sri Lanka.

Joseph Pararajasingham, a member of the Sri Lankan Parliament, and A. Chandranehru, a former member of Sri Lankan Parliament, were founding members of NESoHR. Both were later assassinated allegedly by state-affiliated paramilitaries and posthumously awarded the honour of Maamanithar by the LTTE.

Father M. X. Karunaratnam was the Chairperson of the organization until his assassination on April 20, 2008. In a press release, NESoHR condemned, "in the strongest possible terms", "the Sri Lankan State" for his death.

NESoHR has been cited by the BBC and Amnesty International, as well as Sri Lankan newspapers.

In addition to reporting on human rights, NESoHR has also formed an informal partnership with the Association of Humanitarian Lawyers to discuss the application of international humanitarian law to Sri Lanka's armed conflict.

In the post-war period, NESoHR along with the Chennai-based human rights trust Manitham co-published a book titled "Massacres of Tamils: 1956–2008" documenting 171 massacres of Tamil civilians. The organization was relaunched again in 2013 from outside Sri Lanka, and as of 2015 exiled attorney K. Sivapalan was its vice chairman, who was a former local member of the Sri Lanka Monitoring Mission.

== See also ==
- Human Rights in Sri Lanka
