= 2006 Trincomalee massacre of students =

Murder of five Tamil schoolboys in Sri Lanka

Coordinates: 8.566°N 81.233°E

- Trincomalee (Sri Lanka)
- Location: Trincomalee, Sri Lanka
- Date: 2 January 2006
- Target: Tamil civilians
- Attack type: massacre
- Weapon: Automatics rifles
- Deaths: 5
- Perpetrator: Special Task Force

2006 Trincomalee massacre of students or "Trinco 5" was the murder of five Tamil schoolboys by the Special Task Force (STF) in Trincomalee town on 2 January 2006. The case has received considerable international attention and is regarded as an emblematic case of impunity since no one has been held accountable for the crimes.

== Motive ==
The possible motive behind the murders were revealed in threatening letters written in broken Tamil sent to the families of the victims by a group calling itself "The Vigilant group for the Elimination of the Enemy". One letter stated:

We shot your five sons because they are supporters of the Tigers who are attempting to link our Eastern Province with the North. This land (the East) belongs to the Sinhalese. All Tigers, Tiger supporters and besides Tamil loyalists (pattalarkal) will soon be evicted or killed...This is our sole kingdom, our earth...Meka ape rata, Sinhala rata (This is our kingdom, a Sinhalese kingdom)...

According to the UTHR(J), the letters came from within the security forces and implied the agenda of "Sinhalisation of the East", reflecting the growing dominance of Sinhalese extremists in the Defence Ministry since the Rajapaksa government assumed power.

== Reactions ==
=== Sri Lankan government ===
The government claims were contradicted by the results of the local coroner, who said that they were killed by gunshot wound in execution style. Although a court case is still pending, a Human Rights agency known as UTHR accused that a local police superintendent as the mastermind of the operation to kill the students.

In October 2006, Basil Rajapaksa, then a special adviser to the president, admitted to the US ambassador Robert O. Blake Jr. that the Special Task Force was responsible for the murders.

== Investigation and trial ==
The official inquiry into this incident is still undergoing and Special Task Force personnel were remanded in connection with the murder and further remanded on 18 July 2013 by the Trincomalee Magistrate court.

There were over a hundred witnesses but none were willing to come forward due to intimidation and fear. The only witness who came forward is the target of threats to his safety. Dr. Manoharan, the father of one of the victims, has been threatened by some elements of the Sri Lankan security forces. Human Rights Watch has called on the government to provide adequate protection for the doctor.

According to RSF a minority Tamil journalist Subramaniyam Sugirdharajan who took pictures of the slain students that proved that they died of gunshot injuries not by an explosion of a grenade as claimed by local military authorities was shot dead by unknown gunmen suspected to be paramilitary men. A Tamil three-wheeler driver who had been an eyewitness to the murders was also killed by unknown persons before he could testify in a trial.

On 3 July 2019, the accused IPs Sarath Chandra Perera and Rohitha Vijithakumara, Sgt. M.G. Jayalath, A.P. Amal Pradeep, PCs R.K. Ratnayake, M. Chaminda Lalitha, R.M. Udhaya Mahinda Bandara, M.G.H. Sanjeewa, K.A. Tharaka Ruwansiri, J.M. Nimal Bandara, J.M. Senarath Dissanyake, S.J. Indika Thushara of the STF and SI (Retired) P.G. Ananda Bulanawewa of the Police were acquitted by Chief Magistrate M.M. Mohammed Hamza after a lengthy hearing due to the non-availability of evidence against the accused.

== See also ==
- List of attacks on civilians attributed to Sri Lankan government forces
