= Chandrabose Suthaharan =

Sri Lankan Tamil journalist

Chandrabose Suthagar <Ta>
- சந்திரபோஸ் சுதாகர்
- Born: Kilinochchi
- Died: 16 April 2007; Vavuniya
- Occupation: Editor of Nilam
- Notable credit: Freelance Journalist

Chandrabose Suthagar was a minority Sri Lankan Tamil editor of the Tamil magazine, Nilam, and also wrote for other Tamil news media. He had earlier worked for Virakesari. He was shot and killed on 16 April 2007, in Thirunavatkulam in Vavuniya.

== Personal life ==
Suthaharan and their family background is native to Nedunteevu (Delft Island) in Jaffna. He has two siblings; his elder brother is Chandrabose Basgar and his younger sister is Susila. When he was assassinated in 2007.Suthagar dedicated his career to Tamil literature and journalism; he is survived by his wife and two sons, who continue to honor his memory and legacy.

== Background ==
His killing is part of series of killings, abductions and attacks on journalists in Sri Lanka. It was also seen as part of the intimidation of Tamil media.

== Incident ==
He was shot inside his house by six gunmen who entered his house. His eight-year-old son stated that the killers spoke both Tamil and Sinhala. His home was located inside a government-held area.

== Government investigation ==
The International Press Institute has called for an impartial government investigation into Suthaharan's killing.

== See also ==
- Sri Lankan civil war
- Human Rights in Sri Lanka
- Notable assassinations of the Sri Lankan Civil War
