= Subramaniyam Sugirdharajan =

Tamil journalist of Sri Lanka

- Born: 1970; Sri Lanka
- Died: 24 January 2006, age 35; Trincomalee
- Occupation: Journalist

Subramaniyam Sugirdharajan (1970 – 24 January 2006), popularly known as SSR, was a Sri Lankan journalist working for the Tamil language daily Sudar Oli. On 24 January 2006 during the Sri Lankan civil war, he was shot dead in the eastern port city of Trincomalee. He was 35 years old and the father of two children aged three and two. The assailants were on a motorbike and fired at him from close range.

== Background ==
He was killed a day after writing an article about alleged abuses committed by para-military groups, reported Free Media Movement (FMM), Reporters Without Borders and the Committee to Protect Journalists (CPJ). According to RSF, Sugirdharajan named the Eelam People's Democratic Party (EPDP) among several groups in his article that allegedly committed human rights violations in the Trincomalee region.

The newspaper he worked for also ran photos taken by Sugirdharajan showing that five Trincomalee students who were shot dead at point-blank range on 2 January 2006, disproving the army's claim that they were killed by a grenade explosion.

== Assassination ==
At about 6 a.m. (local time) on 24 January 2006, he was shot and killed as he was waiting for public transport to go to work near the governor's secretaria. His killers used a motorcycle to get away after shooting him. Police went to the scene of the murder.

== Government investigation ==
The international Press institute has called for an impartial government investigation.

== See also ==
- Sri Lankan civil war
- Human Rights in Sri Lanka
- Notable assassinations of the Sri Lankan Civil War
