= P. Devakumaran =

Tamil television journalist of Sri Lanka

- Body in Jaffna Teaching Hospital mortuary.(Tamilnet)
- Died: 28 May 2008; Navanthurai, Jaffna
- Occupations: Television Journalist for MTV English, Sirasa TV in Sinhala and Sakthi TV

Paranirupasingam Devakumaran also spelt as Thevakumar was a minority Sri Lankan Tamil Television journalist who reported for the Maharaja Television which operated MTV English, Sirasa TV in Sinhala and Sakthi TV in Tamil in Jaffna. He and his friend Mahendran Varadan were hacked to death in Navanthurai near Jaffna on 28 May 2008 while he was on his way home by the paramilitary EPDP.

== Background ==
This incident was part of a series of killing, violence, and intimidation against journalists and human rights activists. The killing of journalists have not been investigated leading to conviction of anyone and attacks have continued. He had married one year prior to his murder.

== Incident ==
P. Devakumaran and Mahenthiran Varathan were returning home in an area under Sri Lankan army control on 15 May 2008 at about 4.00 pm when they were hacked to death and the assailants escaped.

== Reaction ==
Free Media Movement stated that

"Not a single disappearance, abduction or murder of a journalist / media worker has been investigated that has brought those responsible to book. We are fearful that investigations into Devakumaran's murder will also suffer a similar fate", the statement said.

"Devakumaran's death must be investigated urgently, meaningfully and impartially. The repugnant impunity that aids and abets violence against journalists and media personnel must come to an end,"

Devakumaran's wife in a statement stated to journalists from Colombo had said that men of Eelam People’s Democratic Party (EPDP), a constituent of ruling United People’s Freedom Alliance (UPFA), were directly involved in her husband’s assassination
