= Navanthurai =

Navanthurai நாவாந்துறை නවන්තුර
- Suburb
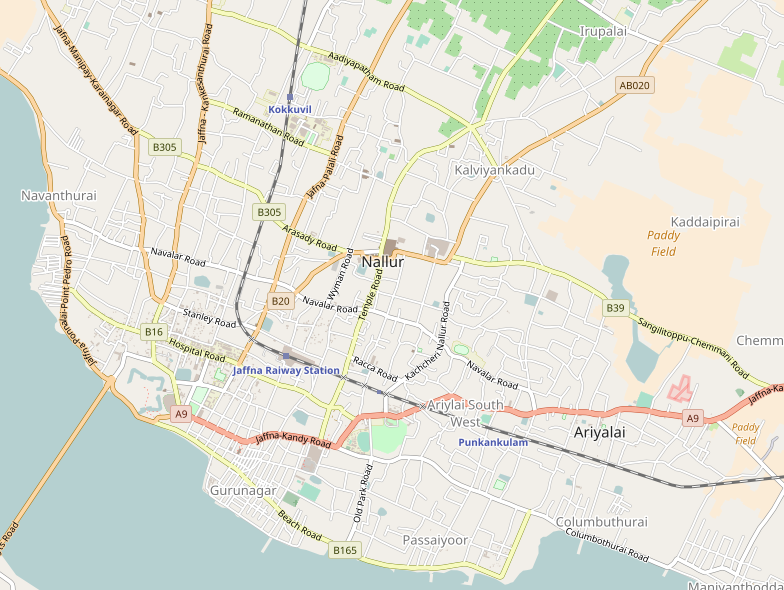
- Location within Greater Jaffna Location within Northern Province
- Coordinates: 9°40′40″N 79°59′56″E
- Country: Sri Lanka
- Province: Northern
- District: Jaffna
- DS Division: Jaffna

Navanthurai (Tamil: நாவாந்துறை, romanized: Nāvāntuṟai, Sinhala: නවන්තුර, romanized: Navantura) is a coastal suburb of the city Jaffna city in northern Sri Lanka. In 2007 the population of Navanthurai North was 1,922 and that of Navanthurai South was 1,907.
