= Eugene John Hebert =

American Jesuit Missionary (1923-disappeared 1990)

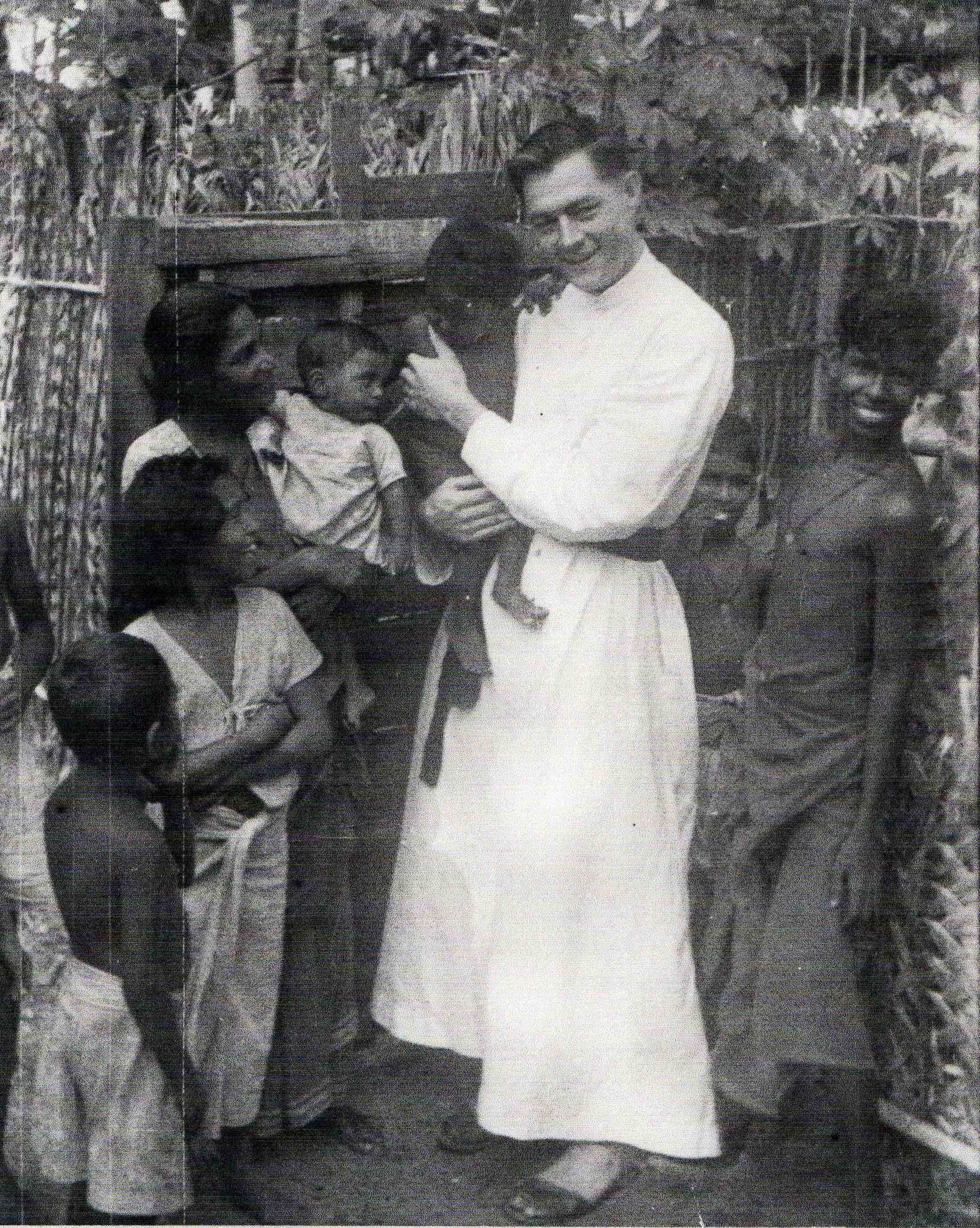
- Father Eugene Hebert in the 1950s
- Born: October 9, 1923; Jennings, Louisiana, United States
- Disappeared: August 15, 1990 (aged 66); Batticaloa, Sri Lanka
- Status: Missing for 36 years, 1 month and 7 days
- Education: Degree in Philosophy and Theology
- Occupation: Jesuit priest
- Employer: Jesuits
- Known for: Human rights activist, Education

Eugene John Hebert was an American-born Jesuit missionary in Sri Lanka. He along with his Tamil driver Betram Francis disappeared on August 15, 1990, as the Sri Lankan civil war was raging. He went missing on his way to the eastern city of Batticaloa from a nearby town of Valaichchenai. He was known for his human rights activity on behalf of the local civilians. The Jesuits believe that he was killed along with his driver.

== Biography ==
Eugene John Hebert was born in Jennings, Louisiana on October 9, 1923. He joined the Society of Jesus on August 14, 1941 at the age of 17. After completion of Jesuit studies, he volunteered for the Sri Lanka Mission. He was accepted and arrived in September 1948. After serving a year in the eastern township of Batticaloa and another in Trincomalee at the Jesuit Colleges, he went to Poona, India to study theology, and was ordained as a priest on March 24, 1954.

After returning to Sri Lanka in April 1956, he was assigned to St Joseph's College in Trincomalee as a teacher and sports coach from 1956 to 1978. He was named principal there for a brief period. In the 1960s, private schools, including Catholic colleges, were taken over by the state, and Hebert was sent to Batticaloa to work at the Eastern Technical Institute, the joint Jesuit and Methodist technical institute, as its director. He was also the basketball coach from 1978 to 1990 at St Michael's College in Batticaloa, where he achieved national championship status over several years.

Hebert was a prominent member of the Batticaloa Peace Committee that has interceded on behalf of the many disappeared and missing people as part of the Sri Lankan civil war with both the Sri Lankan government officials and the rebel Liberation Tigers of Tamil Eelam (LTTE) group.

== Incident ==
During the mid part of August in 1990, there were number of massacres and counter massacres of civilians targeting both the minority Muslim and Tamil communities. Perpetrators were alleged to be the rebel LTTE as well as Sri Lankan government soldiers belonging to Home Guards local auxiliary unit in Batticaloa. Following the massacre of a group of Muslims in the Kattankudy Mosque, the situation at the nearby ethnically mixed town of Valachchenai became tense with unruly Muslim mobs roving around targeting Tamils. In some instances, a number of Tamils had been reportedly killed by a group named Jihad in retaliation. Most Tamils from Valachchenai fled to refugee camps in the provincial capital of Batticaloa leaving behind a group of Catholic sisters, some girls and helpers trapped in a convent.

Father Harry Miller, who worked alongside Rev. Fr. Eugene John Hebert in Batticaloa and accompanied him on the journey from New Orleans, publicly refuted the Sri Lankan government’s official statements regarding Fr. Hebert’s disappearance. In a statement made in 2005, Fr. Miller denied that an exhaustive search party had ever been conducted, calling the claim false. He also rejected allegations that Fr. Hebert had fallen afoul of the LTTE. On the contrary, he attributed responsibility for the incident to off-duty army personnel and looters who were active in Eravur on the day of the disappearance.

Supporting this alternative account, another Catholic priest based in Iruthayapuram village in Trincomalee recounted a testimony he received from a Muslim lorry owner. According to this account, Fr. Hebert and the Tamil boy (Betrum Francis), accompanying him had been intercepted. The boy was taken away and beaten to death, while Fr. Hebert was told he could leave. However, he reportedly refused to abandon the boy. Three days later, Fr. Hebert too met a violent death.

The Bishop of Batticaloa sent Eugene Hebert on August 13 to Valachchenai to assist the trapped sisters and others as well as a security guarantee against an attack. On August 15, the Bishop of Batticaloa organized a security convoy from the city to bring back the trapped sisters and others. He informed Hebert to accompany the convoy on its way back from Valachchenai to Batticaloa. Instead, Hebert informed the bishop that as the situation was getting better, he would leave on his own via a circuitous route through an ethnically mixed town called Eravur to Batticaloa, as he had urgent matters to attend to at the institute where he was the director. Hebert, along with a Tamil boy named Betram Francis, was last seen riding a red Vespa scooter towards Batticaloa via Eravur.

== Reactions ==
Sri Lankan government The Sri Lankan government believes that Hebert was killed by the rebel LTTE who were active around the Eravur area at the time of his disappearance. This apparently was in response to a written request for explanation by the local American Embassy.

Amnesty International An Amnesty International report dated 1990 urged the Sri Lankan government to continue the investigation into the disappearance of Eugene Hebert. It noted that the local investigation by the local military authorities was inconclusive.

Jesuits Local Jesuits such as Harry Miller believe that a mob of civilians may have waylaid and killed Hebert and Betram Francis and destroyed any evidence of the crime. The Jesuit organization believes that he is definitely dead due to foul play.

== See also ==
Other notable clergy killed during the Sri Lankan civil war

- George Jeyarajasingham
- Chandra Fernando (priest)
- Nihal Jim Brown
- Mary Bastian
- Mariampillai Sarathjeevan
- Nicholas Pillai Pakiaranjith
- List of people who disappeared mysteriously (2000–present)
