= Jaffna Polling Division =

Jaffna
- Polling Division
- Coordinates: 9.662570°N 80.020008°E
- Country: Sri Lanka
- Province: Northern Province, Sri Lanka
- Electoral District: Jaffna Electoral District

Area
  - Total: 11.31 km^{2} (4.37 sq mi)

Population (2012)
  - Total: 50,491
  - Density: 4,464/km^{2} (11,560/sq mi)
- ISO 3166 code: EC-10J

The Jaffna Polling Division is a Polling Division in the Jaffna Electoral District, in the Northern Province, Sri Lanka.

== Presidential Election Results ==
=== Summary ===
The winner of Jaffna has matched the final country result 3 out of 8 times.

Year	Jaffna	Jaffna Electoral District	MAE %	Sri Lanka	MAE %
2019	NDF	NDF	1.43%	SLPP	42.19%
2015	NDF	NDF	3.12%	NDF	27.02%
2010	NDF	NDF	2.24%	UPFA	28.00%
2005	UNP	UNP	1.88%	UPFA	20.89%
1999	PA	PA	2.29%	PA	2.71%
1994	PA	PA	6.36%	PA	27.03%
1988	SLMP	SLFP	2.99%	UNP	15.53%
1982	ACTC	ACTC	12.29%	UNP	20.66%
Matches/Mean MAE	3/8	3/8	4.08%	8/8	23.00%

=== 2019 Sri Lankan Presidential Election ===
Party	Jaffna		Jaffna Electoral District		Sri Lanka	
Party	Votes	%	Votes	%	Votes	%
NDF	20,792	85.51%	312,722	83.86%	5,564,239	41.99%
SLPP	1,617	6.65%	23,261	6.24%	6,924,255	52.25%
Other Parties (with < 1%)	1,151	4.73%	23,295	6.25%	717,212	5.41%
IND10	466	1.92%	6,845	1.84%	12,256	0.09%
DUNF	288	1.18%	6,790	1.82%	34,537	0.26%
Valid Votes	24,314	97.53%	372,913	97.07%	13,252,499	98.99%
Rejected Votes	616	2.47%	11,251	2.93%	135,452	1.01%
Total Polled	24,930	75.20%	384,164	68.00%	13,387,951	83.71%
Registered Electors	33,153		564,984		15,992,568	

=== 2015 Sri Lankan Presidential Election ===
Party	Jaffna		Jaffna Electoral District		Sri Lanka	
Party	Votes	%	Votes	%	Votes	%
NDF	17,994	77.91%	253,574	74.42%	6,217,162	51.28%
UPFA	4,502	19.49%	74,454	21.85%	5,768,090	47.58%
Other Parties (with < 1%)	600	2.60%	12,723	3.73%	138,200	1.14%
Valid Votes	23,096	98.20%	340,751	97.14%	12,123,452	98.85%
Rejected Votes	423	1.80%	10,038	2.86%	140,925	1.15%
Total Polled	23,519	71.16%	350,789	64.22%	12,264,377	78.69%
Registered Electors	33,050		546,265		15,585,942	

=== 2010 Sri Lankan Presidential Election ===
Party	Jaffna		Jaffna Electoral District		Sri Lanka	
Party	Votes	%	Votes	%	Votes	%
NDF	7,914	66.17%	113,877	63.84%	4,173,185	40.15%
UPFA	3,296	27.56%	44,154	24.75%	6,015,934	57.88%
Other Parties (with < 1%)	485	4.06%	13,808	7.74%	171,542	1.65%
UDF	139	1.16%	3,325	1.86%	23,290	0.22%
Ind 5	126	1.05%	3,205	1.80%	9,662	0.09%
Valid Votes	11,960	96.34%	178,369	96.35%	10,393,613	99.03%
Rejected Votes	454	3.66%	6,763	3.65%	101,838	0.97%
Total Polled	12,414	19.18%	185,132	25.15%	10,495,451	66.70%
Registered Electors	64,714		736,032		15,734,587	

=== 2005 Sri Lankan Presidential Election ===
Party	Jaffna		Jaffna Electoral District		Sri Lanka	
Party	Votes	%	Votes	%	Votes	%
UNP	301	68.72%	5,523	70.20%	4,706,366	48.43%
UPFA	124	28.31%	1,967	25.00%	4,887,152	50.29%
Other Parties (with < 1%)	13	2.97%	378	4.80%	123,521	1.27%
Valid Votes	438	96.26%	7,868	92.30%	9,717,039	98.88%
Rejected Votes	17	3.74%	656	7.70%	109,869	1.12%
Total Polled	455	0.73%	8,524	1.20%	9,826,908	69.51%
Registered Electors	62,089		707,970		14,136,979	

=== 1999 Sri Lankan Presidential Election ===
Party	Jaffna		Jaffna Electoral District		Sri Lanka	
Party	Votes	%	Votes	%	Votes	%
PA	3,471	48.80%	52,043	46.65%	4,312,157	51.12%
UNP	3,263	45.87%	48,005	43.03%	3,602,748	42.71%
Other Parties (with < 1%)	228	3.21%	8,129	7.29%	496,938	5.89%
LDA	151	2.12%	3,394	3.04%	23,668	0.28%
Valid Votes	7,113	95.77%	111,568	94.91%	8,435,754	97.69%
Rejected Votes	314	4.23%	5,981	5.09%	199,536	2.31%
Total Polled	7,427	14.40%	117,549	19.15%	8,635,290	72.17%
Registered Electors	51,581		613,718		11,965,536	

=== 1994 Sri Lankan Presidential Election ===
Party	Jaffna		Jaffna Electoral District		Sri Lanka	
Party	Votes	%	Votes	%	Votes	%
PA	1,143	89.86%	16,934	96.35%	4,709,205	62.28%
UNP	108	8.49%	223	1.27%	2,715,283	35.91%
Ind 2	15	1.18%	341	1.94%	58,888	0.78%
Other Parties (with < 1%)	6	0.47%	77	0.44%	78,152	1.03%
Valid Votes	1,272	99.45%	17,575	99.20%	7,561,526	98.03%
Rejected Votes	7	0.55%	141	0.80%	151,706	1.97%
Total Polled	1,279	2.56%	17,716	2.97%	7,713,232	69.12%
Registered Electors	50,045		596,422		11,158,880	

=== 1988 Sri Lankan Presidential Election ===
Party	Jaffna		Jaffna Electoral District		Sri Lanka	
Party	Votes	%	Votes	%	Votes	%
SLMP	3,616	33.99%	42,198	35.15%	235,701	4.63%
SLFP	3,546	33.34%	44,197	36.82%	2,289,857	44.95%
UNP	3,475	32.67%	33,650	28.03%	2,569,199	50.43%
Valid Votes	10,637	95.69%	120,045	93.38%	5,094,754	98.24%
Rejected Votes	479	4.31%	8,517	6.62%	91,499	1.76%
Total Polled	11,116	22.58%	128,562	23.30%	5,186,256	55.87%
Registered Electors	49,229		551,713		9,283,143	

=== 1982 Sri Lankan Presidential Election ===
Party	Jaffna		Jaffna Electoral District		Sri Lanka	
Party	Votes	%	Votes	%	Votes	%
ACTC	9,319	47.78%	87,263	40.03%	173,934	2.67%
UNP	6,419	32.91%	44,775	20.54%	3,450,815	52.93%
SLFP	3,258	16.71%	77,210	35.42%	2,546,348	39.05%
Other Parties (with < 1%)	496	2.54%	8,650	3.97%	348,954	5.35%
Valid Votes	19,502	96.48%	218,003	95.36%	6,520,156	98.78%
Rejected Votes	711	3.52%	10,610	4.64%	80,470	1.22%
Total Polled	20,213	47.79%	228,613	45.86%	6,600,626	80.15%
Registered Electors	42,296		498,545		8,235,358	

== Parliamentary Election Results ==
=== Summary ===
The winner of Jaffna has matched the final country result 0 out of 7 times.

Year	Jaffna	Jaffna Electoral District	MAE %	Sri Lanka	MAE %
2020	ITAK	ITAK		SLPFA	
2015	ITAK	ITAK	1.43%	UNP	36.58%
2010	ITAK	ITAK	2.22%	UPFA	24.10%
2004	ITAK	ITAK	2.73%	UPFA	5.95%
2001	TULF	TULF	2.04%	UNP	20.51%
2000	EPDP	EPDP	4.12%	PA	12.60%
1994	SLMC	IND2	72.92%	PA	1.69%
1989	INDI	INDI	2.35%	UNP	27.57%
Matches/Mean MAE	0/7	0/7	12.54%	7/7	18.43%

=== 2020 Sri Lankan Parliamentary Election ===
Party	Jaffna		Jaffna Electoral District		Sri Lanka	
Party	Votes	%	Votes	%	Votes	%
ITAK	7,634	33%	112,967	31.46%	327,168	2.82%
EPDP	5,545	23.97%	45,797	12.75%	61,464	0.53%
ACTC	4,642	20.06%	55,303	15.4%	67,766	0.58%
SLFP	1,469	6.35%	49,373	13.75%	66,579	0.57%
TMTK	1,372	5.67%	35,925	10%	51,301	0.44%
SJB	805	3.48%	13,564	3.78%	2,771,984	23.9%
IND09_D10	374	1.62%	3,331	0.92%	3,331	0.03%
DLF	254	1.1%	1,656	0.46%	2,964	0.03%
Other Parties (with < 1%)	1,101	4.75%	39,224	11.48%	8,990,771	71.04%
Valid Votes	23,136	68.28%	359,130	91.12%	11,598,929	93.97%
Rejected Votes	2,029	5.99%	35,006	8.88%	744,373	6.03%
Total Polled	25,165	74.26%	394,136	68.92%	12,343,302	75.89%
Registered Electors	33,886		571,848		16,263,885	

=== 2015 Sri Lankan Parliamentary Election ===
Party	Jaffna		Jaffna Electoral District		Sri Lanka	
Party	Votes	%	Votes	%	Votes	%
ITAK	13,545	68.28%	207,577	70.08%	515,963	4.63%
EPDP	2,203	11.10%	30,232	10.21%	33,481	0.30%
UNP	1,414	7.13%	20,025	6.76%	5,098,916	45.77%
AITC	1,132	5.71%	15,022	5.07%	18,644	0.17%
UPFA	1,110	5.60%	17,309	5.84%	4,732,664	42.48%
Other Parties (with < 1%)	434	2.19%	6,034	2.04%	580,476	5.21%
Valid Votes	19,838	92.69%	296,199	90.91%	11,140,333	95.35%
Rejected Votes	1,283	5.99%	25,496	7.83%	516,926	4.42%
Total Polled	21,402	64.76%	325,805	61.56%	11,684,111	77.66%
Registered Electors	33,050		529,239		15,044,490	

=== 2010 Sri Lankan Parliamentary Election ===
Party	Jaffna		Jaffna Electoral District		Sri Lanka	
Party	Votes	%	Votes	%	Votes	%
ITAK	4,713	46.59%	65,119	44.03%	233,190	2.91%
UPFA	3,479	34.39%	47,622	32.20%	4,846,388	60.38%
AITC	688	6.80%	6,362	4.30%	7,544	0.09%
UNP	616	6.09%	12,624	8.54%	2,357,057	29.37%
Other Parties (with < 1%)	489	4.83%	13,279	8.98%	486,787	6.06%
TULF	130	1.29%	2,892	1.96%	9,223	0.11%
Valid Votes	10,115	90.31%	147,898	87.89%	8,026,322	96.03%
Rejected Votes	1,037	9.26%	19,774	11.75%	581,465	6.96%
Total Polled	11,200	17.31%	168,277	22.68%	8,358,246	59.29%
Registered Electors	64,714		742,005		14,097,690	

=== 2004 Sri Lankan Parliamentary Election ===
Party	Jaffna		Jaffna Electoral District		Sri Lanka	
Party	Votes	%	Votes	%	Votes	%
ITAK	16,353	87.78%	257,320	90.60%	633,203	6.85%
EPDP	1,710	9.18%	18,612	6.55%	24,942	0.27%
IP1-Jaffna District	360	1.93%	5,156	1.82%	6,121	0.07%
Other Parties (with < 1%)	207	1.11%	2,938	1.03%	764,786	8.28%
Valid Votes	18,630	94.33%	284,026	93.04%	9,241,931	94.52%
Rejected Votes	1,120	5.67%	21,233	6.96%	534,452	5.47%
Total Polled	19,750	34.37%	305,259	46.65%	9,777,821	75.74%
Registered Electors	57,460		654,415		12,909,631	

=== 2001 Sri Lankan Parliamentary Election ===
Party	Jaffna		Jaffna Electoral District		Sri Lanka	
Party	Votes	%	Votes	%	Votes	%
TULF	7,368	56.88%	102,324	54.84%	348,164	3.89%
EPDP	3,647	28.15%	57,208	30.66%	72,783	0.81%
UNP	974	7.52%	16,245	8.71%	4,086,026	45.62%
IG1-Jaffna District	311	2.40%	2,677	1.43%	2,900	0.03%
SLMC	299	2.31%	3,364	1.80%	105,346	1.18%
DPLF	274	2.12%	1,454	0.78%	16,669	0.19%
Other Parties (with < 1%)	81	0.63%	3,326	1.78%	927,588	10.36%
Valid Votes	12,954	95.40%	186,598	94.59%	8,955,844	94.77%
Rejected Votes	624	4.60%	10,681	5.41%	494,009	5.23%
Total Polled	13,578	24.58%	197,279	31.14%	9,449,878	76.03%
Registered Electors	55,244		633,457		12,428,762	

=== 2000 Sri Lankan Parliamentary Election ===
Party	Jaffna		Jaffna Electoral District		Sri Lanka	
Party	Votes	%	Votes	%	Votes	%
EPDP	1,571	30.06%	41,536	36.13%	50,702	0.59%
TULF	1,277	24.43%	32,761	28.50%	105,907	1.23%
UNP	581	11.12%	10,896	9.48%	3,451,765	40.12%
DPLF	471	9.01%	4,778	4.16%	20,655	0.24%
IG2-Jaffna District	406	7.77%	4,905	4.27%	31,443	0.37%
ACTC	394	7.54%	10,618	9.24%	27,289	0.32%
IG3-Jaffna District	226	4.32%	1,633	1.42%	6,109	0.07%
IG6-Jaffna District	120	2.30%	2,058	1.79%	3,162	0.04%
IG1-Jaffna District	114	2.18%	1,641	1.43%	9,799	0.11%
Other Parties (with < 1%)	67	1.28%	4,145	3.61%	887,501	10.32%
Valid Votes	5,227	N/A	114,971	N/A	8,602,617	N/A

=== 1994 Sri Lankan Parliamentary Election ===
Party	Jaffna		Jaffna Electoral District		Sri Lanka	
Party	Votes	%	Votes	%	Votes	%
SLMC	1,914	94.66%	2,098	15.56%	143,307	1.80%
IND2-Jaffna District	76	3.76%	10,744	79.71%	16,690	0.21%
IND1-Jaffna District	26	1.29%	374	2.77%	48,199	0.61%
Other Parties (with < 1%)	6	0.30%	263	1.95%	9,411	0.12%
Valid Votes	2,022	99.61%	13,479	97.41%	7,943,688	95.20%
Rejected Votes	8	0.39%	358	2.59%	400,395	4.80%
Total Polled	2,030	4.06%	13,837	2.32%	8,344,095	74.75%
Registered Electors	50,045		596,375		11,163,064	

=== 1989 Sri Lankan Parliamentary Election ===
Party	Jaffna		Jaffna Electoral District		Sri Lanka	
Party	Votes	%	Votes	%	Votes	%
IND1-Jaffna District	18,688	62.95%	150,340	62.68%	175,579	3.14%
TULF	5,323	17.93%	60,013	25.02%	188,594	3.37%
SLMC	3,387	11.41%	8,439	3.52%	202,016	3.61%
ACTC	1,410	4.75%	7,610	3.17%	7,610	0.14%
UNP	470	1.58%	5,460	2.28%	2,838,005	50.71%
DPLF	409	1.38%	7,993	3.33%	19,150	0.34%
Valid Votes	29,687	94.74%	239,855	90.49%	5,596,468	93.87%
Rejected Votes	1,649	5.26%	25,203	9.51%	365,563	6.13%
Total Polled	31,336	63.86%	265,058	44.76%	5,962,031	63.60%
Registered Electors	49,068		592,210		9,374,164	

== Demographics ==
=== Ethnicity ===
The Jaffna Polling Division has a Sri Lankan Tamil majority (95.6%) . In comparison, the Jaffna Electoral District (which contains the Jaffna Polling Division) has a Sri Lankan Tamil majority (98.6%)

Ethnicity in Jaffna
1. Sri Lankan Tamil (95.6%)
2. Moor (3.30%)
3. Other (1.00%)

=== Religion ===
The Jaffna Polling Division has a Roman Catholic majority (52.9%) and a significant Hindu population (37.7%) . In comparison, the Jaffna Electoral District (which contains the Jaffna Polling Division) has a Hindu majority (82.6%) and a significant Roman Catholic population (12.6%)

Religion in Jaffna
1. Roman Catholic (52.9%)
2. Hindu (37.7%)
3. Other Christian (5.70%)
4. Muslim (3.40%)
5. Other (0.30%)
