= Sampath Lakmal de Silva =

Sri Lankan journalist

- Born: c. 1982
- Died: July 2, 2006; Colombo
- Occupations: Freelance press and Television journalist
- Notable credit: Specialist in Defence articles

Sampath Lakmal de Silva (c. 1982 – July 2, 2006) was a Sri Lankan Freelance press and television journalist specialising in defense articles and wrote for various publications including Irudina, Lakbima, Sathdina and TNL and he also worked for various television channels earlier he was the defense correspondent for now-defunct Sathdina Weekly. He was found shot dead in Dehiwela in Colombo.

== Background ==
Sampath Lakmal de Silva was supposed to have possessed sensitive information regarding defense personnel and there had been threats to him in the past. He was a well known and reliable informant on defense matters. There are reports he was a double agent for both the Sri Lankan Intelligence and the LTTE but there is no clear evidence on this. Upcountry Peoples' Front (UPF), P. Radhakrishnan said that Sampath Lakmal de Silva had information about killing done by the army.

== Incident ==
Sampath Lakmal de Silva received phones and went to meet defense personnel whom he knew very well and his mother Rupa de Silva overhead him greeting the person at the other end as Kumar Sir and it was later revealed he had met one Lieutenant Kumara. Later his body was found in Dehiwela gunned down.

== Reaction ==
The International Federation of Journalists condemned the murder:

"The IFJ supports its affiliates in Sri Lanka in condemning the murder of de Silva, and in calling upon authorities to investigate the case immediately so that those responsible can be brought to justice as soon as possible. Sri Lankan authorities must take more responsibility for these attacks and establish stronger protections for media workers to prevent journalists like de Silva senselessly losing their lives just for doing their jobs."

== Government investigation ==
Sri Lankan defense personnel were questioned.

== See also ==
- Sri Lankan civil war
- Human Rights in Sri Lanka
- Notable assassinations of the Sri Lankan Civil War
