= Long Range Reconnaissance Patrol (Sri Lanka) =

Long Range Reconnaissance Patrol (Deep Penetration Unit)
- දිගු දුර විහිදුම් බලකාය
- Active: 1996–present
- Country: Sri Lanka
- Allegiance: Directorate Military Intelligence of Sri Lanka Army
- Branch: Sri Lanka Army
- Type: Special Operations
- Role: Counter Terrorism, Unconventional warfare, Direct action, Black operations, Special reconnaissance, Reconnaissance and sabotage in deep battlespace, mainly targeting of enemy commanders.
- Size: Classified
- Nickname: Mahasohon brigade
- Engagements: Sri Lankan Civil War Other classified
- Decorations: 2 Parama Weera Vibhushanaya

Commanders
- Notable commanders: Colonel Raj Vijayasiri RWP, RSP; Lieutenant Colonel J.A.L Jayasinghe, PWV, WWV, RWP, RSP †; Colonel Tuan Nizam Muthaliff RWP †

The Long Range Reconnaissance Patrol (LRRP) (Sinhala: දිගු දුර විහිදුම් බලකාය Digu Dura Vihidum Balakaya) is a Covert Operation unit of the Sri Lanka Army. This unit is also known as the Deep Penetration Unit (DPU). Colonel Raj Vijayasiri of the Special Forces regiment is credited as the main figure who first introduced the DPU concept to the Sri Lankan army.

LRRP units carry out the most complex and dangerous military operations in Sri Lanka. During the Sri Lankan Civil War. LRRP units have been successful in assassinating several high-level commanders of the LTTE in LTTE-held territory.

The LRRP suffered a setback when a safehouse was raided by the police; they arrested several personnel along with weapons. Before the misunderstanding was later cleared out and the arrested released, the names of the personnel involved in the units were released to the public media, resulting in the assassination of several of them. The LRRP was later reformed and has resumed its activities following the resumption of hostilities after a ceasefire between the government and the LTTE was canceled.

== Organization ==
The exact number of troops serving in LRRP is highly classified and neither the Sri Lanka Army nor the Sri Lankan government has officially declared its existence. The LRRP units are operated by personnel from Special forces of Sri Lanka army. 'Mahasohon brigade' is a nickname given for this Unit. (According to Sinhala folklore stories, Maha Sona is a feared demon, similar to a werewolf in European folklore, who attacks humans by hiding in isolated places in the night).

During the war, LRRP teams got HUMINT support from disgruntled ex-LTTE members in order to carry out operations against LTTE. LRRP personnel have received specialized training in Sri Lanka and abroad. LRRP units have also received training from US Special Forces.

== History ==
Long-range reconnaissance patrols of the Sri Lanka Army have played a notable role in Sri Lanka's multi-phase military campaign against the Liberation Tigers of Tamil Eelam (LTTE). LRRP teams from 3rd Special Forces regiment of Sri Lanka Army have been most successful in carrying out assassinations on high-ranking members of the LTTE. The LRRP concept was developed by Major Sreepathi Gunasekara who formed a special recon unit named 'Delta Patrols' in 1986 which later evolved into a highly secretive LRRP battalion.

=== Exposure ===
The date of formation of the LRRP remains classified but is believed to have influenced the LTTE to enter the ceasefire agreement with the Government in 2002 to cease LRRP activities. LRRP activities were ceased. The military believed that the targeting of high-profile LTTE leadership by the LRRP was a prominent factor in prompting the LTTE to agree for negotiations.

The existence of LRRP was revealed as a result of a raid on 2 January 2002, when a police team led by SP Kulasiri Udugampola raided an LRRP safehouse in Athurugiriya, a suburb close to the capital, Colombo under the belief of an assassination plot on the leaders of the recently elected United National Party government. Six personnel were arrested, including Captain Nilam, the leader of the unit. Four soldiers and a former LTTE cadre were also arrested. In addition, a number of weapons were taken into custody, including explosives, anti-tank and thermobaric weapons. Details of this raid and the weapons were made public through media. Attempts by the military hierarchy to get the arrested personnel released failed, and Army commander Lt. Gen. Lionel Balagalla issued a public statement revealing the true nature of this unit. The arrested personnel were released only after interrogation on 13 January, under orders from Defence Minister Tilak Marapana, who expressed outrage over the police raid.

Soon after the incident, LTTE began a campaign to eliminate the personnel those who were suspected of assisting LRRP. A key informant of the unit, known as Mike, was abducted and killed by the LTTE on 20 January. More than 80 persons involving with providing intelligence to the LRRP were assassinated after this. The newly elected government did not take any significant measures to stop it, and requests made by the state intelligence agencies were ignored on the basis that it will affect the ceasefire.

The Army Commander, under the direction of the Defence Minister, appointed a Court of Inquiry to investigate the activities of the LRRP. The conclusion of the court of inquiry was that their activities were legitimate and all military hardware found was obtained through legitimate means. As the public controversy on this incident and the killings continued, President Chandrika Kumaratunga appointed a Commission of Inquiry to probe the safehouse raid. The commission's conclusion was that in addition to compromising national security interests, the raid was a "total betrayal and absolute treachery to the nation". The report included a list of officers of the police and army responsible for the incident.

A special team was set up by the Chief of Police to investigate into the actions of Udugampola and several other police officers.

=== Reformation ===
After the ceasefire was canceled and hostilities resumed in 2006, the LRRP was reformed and actively participating in the operations against the LTTE. The LRRP units headed by the Special Forces regiment and Commando regiment launched several attacks against LTTE leaders. Renegade LTTE cadres of the Tamil Makkal Viduthalai Pulikal served as point-men for LRRP field teams and informants that successfully infiltrated the LTTE ranks. Head of the LTTE military intelligence, Col. Charles, was killed in one such attack. Cheliyan, the deputy leader of the Sea Tigers, was also believed to be killed in an LRRP attack, but the claim had been false.

The LTTE accused the LRRP of targeting civilians in areas under their control but military spokesman Brigadier Udaya Nanayakkara denied any involvement in these incidents, stating that the LRRP only targets armed LTTE cadres. In June 2008, The LTTE accused LRRP units of killing 26 civilians in three attacks alleged attacks and have also blamed LRRP for killing of Tamil National Alliance member K. Sivanesan. It was also accused of assassinating Father M. X. Karunaratnam, the chairman of the Pro-LTTE North East Secretariat on Human Rights (NESOHR).

== Operations ==
LRRP units have been successful in carrying out several attacks behind enemy lines. They operate in small groups, who go in and out of enemy territory clandestinely through jungle routes and seek their targets. These groups camp in the jungles until they are ready to take their designated target. Many of the attacks launched by LRRP units targeted high-profile LTTE commanders and were carried out in the manner of roadside ambushes. Before the 2002 ceasefire agreement was signed, the government denied allegations from the LTTE that military deep-penetration units were targeting their leaders.

Shankar, head of the LTTE air wing, was killed in such an attack on 26 September 2001. Although his death was speculated to be a result of an internal struggle within the LTTE, the LTTE accused Army LRRP units of launching the attack that killed him. A senior sea tiger commander, Gangai Amaran, was another high-profile LTTE leader killed by the LRRP. Other LTTE commanders killed in LRRP attacks include Batticaloa District Intelligence Head Lt. Col. Nizam, LTTE Batticaloa-Ampara Communications Chief Major Mano and artillery specialist Major Sathiyaseelan.

Former head of the LTTE political wing, S. P. Tamilselvan’s vehicle was attacked by LRRP units in May 2001. Tamilselvan was not in the vehicle at the time. LRRP units have also made failed assassination attempts on several other LTTE leaders including Col. Karuna, Col. Jeyam and Brig. Balraj. The LTTE has accused the LRRP of attempting to carry out attacks even against the LTTE leader, Velupillai Prabhakaran.

List of top LTTE commanders killed by LRRP:

- Vaithilingam Sornalingam (Shankar), founder and leader of the air wing and marine division of LTTE - 26 September 2001
- Shanmuganathan Ravishankar (alias Col. Charles), head of LTTE Military Intelligence Wing - 6 January 2008
- Mano
- Gangai Amaran, Deputy Leader of Sea Tigers - 2001

== See also ==
- Long Range Reconnaissance Patrol
