= Chandra Fernando (priest) =

Sri Lankan priest and human rights activist

- Born: Chandra Fernando; August 9, 1942; Sri Lanka
- Died: June 6, 1988 (aged 46); Batticaloa, Sri Lanka
- Cause of death: Assassination
- Resting place: Unknown
- Education: Degree in Theology
- Occupation: Priest
- Employer: Roman Catholic Church
- Known for: Human Rights activist

Chandra Fernando (August 9, 1942 – June 6, 1988) was a priest from the town of Baticaloa in minority Tamil-dominated eastern province of Sri Lanka. He was known for his human rights activism. He was assassinated by unknown men on June 6, 1988.

== Biography ==
Chandra Fernando, born in 1942 in Fernandos Lane, Puliyantheevu (presently called Batticaloa Town), was primarily educated at St. Michael's College National School and ordained as Catholic Priest in the year 1970. He served as a Parish Priest at St. Mary’s Co-cathedral, Batticaloa from 1984 to June 6, 1988.

== Death ==
He was killed by unknown gunmen on June 6, 1988, in his own church (St. Mary’s Co-Cathedral) when the city was under the administration of Indian Peace Keeping Force per the Indo-Lanka peace accord of 1985. He was the secretary of the local Batticalao Citizens Committee and was instrumental in highlighting human rights violations by all sides in the Sri Lankan civil war including the rebel LTTE group which was at that time battling the Indian Peace Keeping Force (IPKF) and aligned para-military groups. There were many human rights violations committed by all including the authority in power.

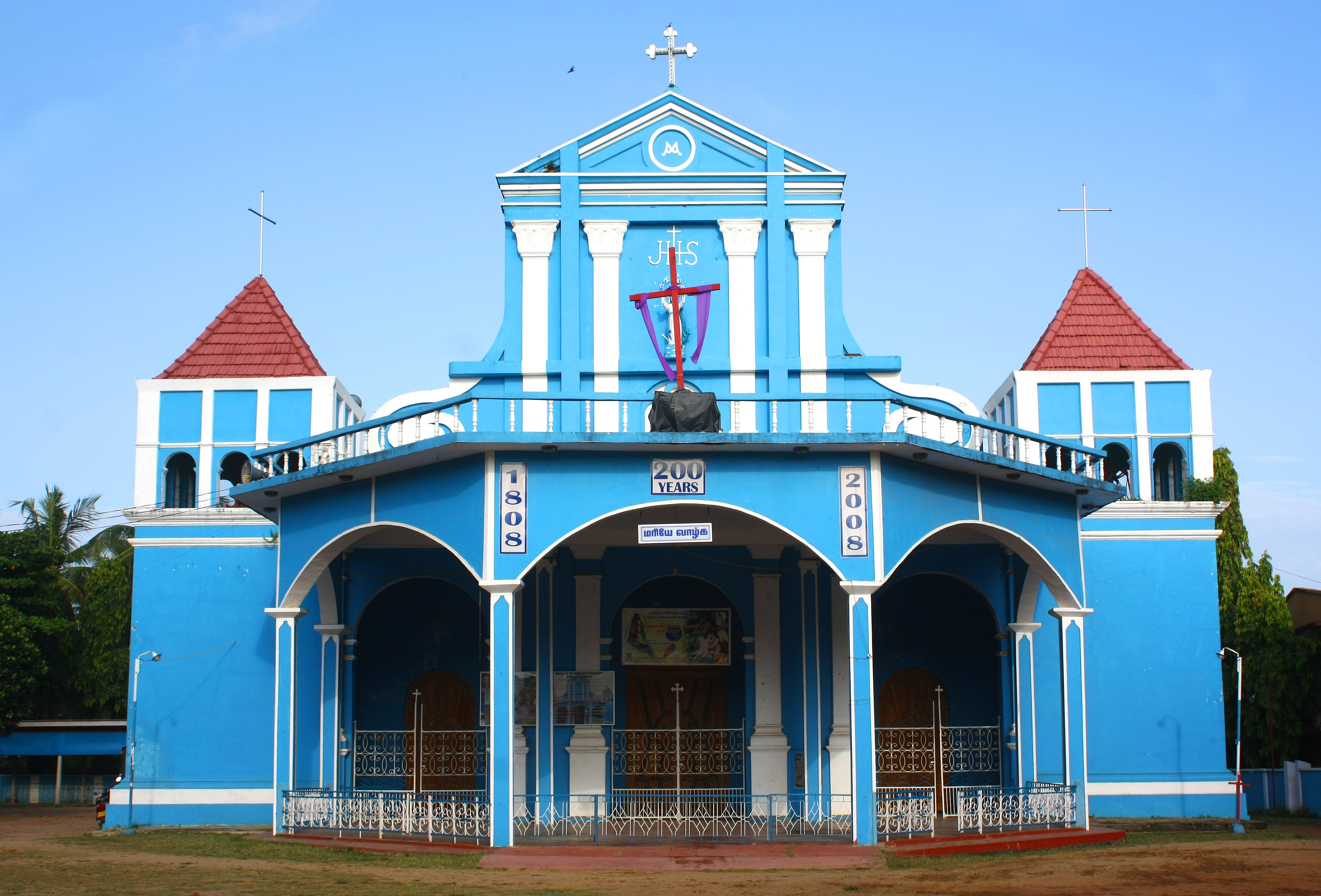
The St. Mary's Cathedral, Batticaloa in which Chandra Fernando was killed

Although according to a report by the pro-LTTE Tamilnet, he was killed by a gunman belonging to the paramilitary group Peoples Liberation Organization of Tamil Eelam (PLOTE) organization working for the local Indian Army administration, but according to David Jeyaraj, an ethnic Sri Lankan Tamil journalist based in Canada, he was killed by the operatives of the paramilitary group Eelam Peoples Revolutionary Liberation Front (EPRLF). This seems to be corroborated by independent sources.

== See also ==
Other notable clergy killed during the Sri Lankan civil war

- George Jeyarajasingham
- Nihal Jim Brown
- Mary Bastian
- Eugene Herbert
- Nicholas Pillai Pakiaranjith
- Mariampillai Sarathjeevan
