= Suresh Kumar and Ranjith Kumar incident =

Tamil journalists of Sri Lanka

Suresh Kumar and Ranjith Kumar were minority Sri Lankan Tamils working for the Uthayan – a Tamil newspaper published from Jaffna. Uthayan has been specifically targeted for its independent reporting by the Sri Lankan military and the paramilitary group EPDP. They were killed on 2 May 2006 during an attack on the Uthayan office.

== Background ==
In Jaffna – which was under Sri Lankan army control during the Sri Lankan civil war– journalists, human rights activists and civilians lived under constant fear. The two journalists' killing was part of a series of killing, abduction and attacks on the Tamil media in Sri Lanka. These killings, abductions and threats were seen as part of the dirty war launched by Mahinda Rajapaksa government.

== Incident and reaction ==
Suresh Kumar and Ranjith Kumar were killed after a Uthayan published a cartoon mocking Douglas Devananda the leader of EPDP a paramilitary group allied with the Sri Lankan Army. Armed Gunmen entered the office of Uthayan in army controlled Jaffna on 2 May 2006 and demanded to see the editor R. Kuhanathan and finding he was not there opened fire and the two employees died instantly.
