= Vankalai =

Vankalai வங்காலை වන්කලයි
- Village
- Location within Northern Province Location within Sri Lanka
- Coordinates: 8°53′0″N 79°56′0″E
- Country: Sri Lanka
- Province: Northern
- District: Mannar
- DS Division: Nanattan

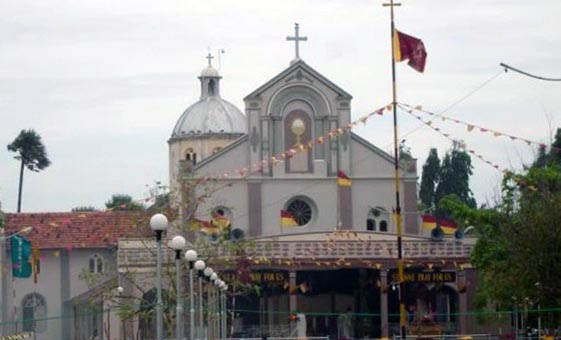
Our Lady of St. Anne's Church originally built during the Portuguese colonial period, an important landmark in Vankalai

Vankalai or Vangalai or Vangkaalai (Tamil: வங்காலை vaṅkālai) is a predominantly fishing and farming village situated in Mannar District of the Northern Province of Sri Lanka. It lies along the Naanaattan Road with the sea on its west connecting to the Indian Ocean. The shores from Vankalai 20 km south to the ancient Tamil subsidiary port of Kudiramalai formed the world's most famous pearl fishing banks in the classical and medieval periods. Its northern boundary is the historic Hindu shrine of Thiru Ketheeswaram.

== Geography ==
Vankalai is a blend of sandy and agrarian lands. Apart from fisheries and farming, there is also an educational and professional tradition. There are a number of teachers, government officials, clergymen, nuns and professionals from the area.

== Demography ==
Vankalai is a Christian village with Roman Catholics being more than 99% and Protestant groups comprising the remainder. Vankalai has now become one of the largest villages in Mannar. Currently, its population figure is a little over 8,000. Vankalai is inhabited mainly by members of the Bharatha community.

The Portuguese invasion and destruction of the Tamil territories between 1505–1658 caused most of Mannar including villages such as Vankalai to become Catholic villages.

In the centre of this village, there is a huge ancient Catholic church called Our Lady of St. Anne's Church.

== See also ==
- Vankalai massacre
