= Thiruchelvam Nihal Jim Brown =

20th-century Sri Lankan priest

Thiruchchelvam Nihal Jim Brown
- Father Thiruchchelvam Nihal Jim Brown
- Born: 1972; Jaffna, Sri Lanka
- Disappeared: August 20, 2006 (aged 33–34)
- Status: Missing for 20 years and 8 days
- Occupations: Parish Priest of St. Philip Neri Church, Sri Lanka

Thiruchchelvam Nihal Jim Brown (1972 – 2006) was a minority Sri Lankan Tamil, Roman Catholic parish priest who disappeared during the Sri Lankan civil war. He was active helping his parishioners during the bombing of his church in northern Sri Lanka. He went missing with Wenceslaus Vinces Vimalathas on August 20, 2006, and is presumed dead.

== Background ==
Allaipiddy village falls within the government-controlled territory in northern Sri Lanka. It is a prominent minority Sri Lankan Tamil but Roman Catholic dominant village in the Jaffna Peninsula. The Sri Lankan Navy has security jurisdiction in the surrounding area.

Thiruchchelvam Nihal Jim Brown was ordained in 2004. In July 2006, he was appointed parish priest of St. Philip Neri Church in the Jaffna district. Brown took over the role of parish priest after his predecessor, Amal Raj, requested a transfer from St. Philip Neri after having allegedly received death threats from a local Sri Lankan Navy officer. As part of ongoing military operations, the Sri Lankan Army shelled the St. Philip Neri's Church in Allaipiddy on August 13, 2006, killing 15 refugees sheltering there.

Brown was publicly rebuked by navy officials for having moved all 300, mostly Catholic, Allaipiddy families to a safer Catholic church at Kayts eight miles away during military operations. Brown was also accused by the Sri Lankan Navy commanding officer of Allaipiddy of helping the rebel group Liberation Tigers of Tamil Eelam (LTTE) to dig bunkers.

== Disappearance ==
According to an Amnesty International report, on the day they went missing, Brown and Wenceslaus Vinces Vimalathas were travelling by motorbike to Allaipiddy village, when they met a friend who accompanied them to the Allaipiddy Sri Lankan Navy (SLN) checkpoint. The friend left the two men standing at the checkpoint at approximately 2.10pm. An eyewitness confirmed that they saw the two men shortly after this, travelling through Allaipiddy on a motorbike. The eyewitness then saw two motorbikes each carrying three armed men wearing bulletproof vests, following Brown and Vimalathas along the road. The six armed men then stopped outside St. Mary's Church in Allaipiddy and following some discussion, one of the motorbikes turned back in the direction of the SLN Allaipiddy checkpoint. When the eyewitness reached the SLN checkpoint in order to leave Allaipiddy, they saw the same three armed men who had turned back from St. Mary's Church talking to the SLN personnel and pointing in the direction of Allaipiddy. The armed men then allegedly rode back to Allaipiddy village, taking a different route than they had before.

Inquiries about the whereabouts of Brown and Vimalathas were made at a number of churches across the Jaffna Peninsula and in surrounding areas. Rear Admiral Upali Ranaweera, Commander of the SLN's Northern Region, denied that the two men were arrested. Navy personnel at the Allaipiddy checkpoint stated that Brown and Vimalathas passed through the Allaipiddy checkpoint and returned soon after, travelling in the direction of Jaffna town. However, local police have been unable to process their request to the Navy to produce the evidence of their return to the Jaffna city. A complaint was lodged with local police as well as the Human Rights Commission regarding their disappearance and investigations took place into their whereabouts. The local human rights group UTHR(J) blamed the Sri Lankan Navy for the disappearances of Brown and Vimalathas.

== Controversy over found body ==
According to local newspapers, a "mutilated torso" packed in a sand bag found off the coast of the Jaffna Peninsula, near Pungudutheevu, on March 14, 2007, was identified as the dead priest. However, the Sri Lankan government announced in June 2007 that subsequent DNA analyses had proved that the remains were not those of either Brown or Vimalathas.

== See also ==
Other notable clergy killed during the Sri Lankan civil war

- Chandra Fernando
- Eugene John Hebert
- George Jeyarajasingham
- List of people who disappeared mysteriously: post-1970
- Mariampillai Sarathjeevan
- Mary Bastian
- Nicholas Pillai Pakiaranjith
