= George Jeyarajasingham =

Sri Lankan activist (??–1984)

The memorial built to commemorate the Reverend George Jeyaragasingham by the Jeevothayam Methodist Farm which is run to help refugees.

George Jeyarajasingham (died 13 December 1984) was a minority Sri Lankan Tamil human rights activist and a Methodist missionary from the Mannar district of Sri Lanka. He and three others were shot dead on 13 December 1984 when they were traveling in his vehicle. Later their bodies were burnt along with his vehicle.

== Background ==
He was of minority Sri Lankan Tamil origin. He was born in the city of Komari in the eastern part of Sri Lanka. He was attached to the northwestern Mannar district Methodist church.

He was in charge of a big Methodist farm known as Jeevothayam Methodist Center in a nearby village called Murunkan in the Mannar district. He was engaged in social and pastoral work with the families of victims of the many disappearances and killings which were taking place in that area. He was known to help the civilians by interceding on their behalf with the local military authorities.

During military offensives by the Sri Lankan Army in 1984 as part of the ongoing Sri Lankan Civil War in Mannar region, a local Roman Catholic priest Fr. Mary Bastian and George Jeyarajasingham became the focal point of human rights activism on behalf of the local people. He and Mary Bastian became the local contact for the Sri Lankan government appointed presidential committee to investigate Human Rights violations in the Mannar district.

== Murder ==
According to Pax Christi, on 13 December 1984 he was requested by the army to give evidence on some of the matters he was reporting. Along with his driver Abdul Cader Sulaiman, his Sinhalese wife Brigette Jeyarajasingham and a police constable named Jesuthasan Roche attached to the Murunkan police station, he was allegedly stopped by Sri Lankan Army personnel while traveling from Mannar to Murunkan. The victims were shot dead at point blank range. The perpetrators later burnt the car and the victims' bodies along with the vehicle. Mary Bastian collected the remains of victims including Jeyarajasingham and handed them over to the Jeevothayam Methodist Center.

== See also ==
- Chandra Fernando
- Nihal Jim Brown
- Eugene John Hebert
- Mariampillai Sarathjeevan
- Mary Bastian
- Nicholas Pillai Pakiaranjith

== Notes ==
- The author of Speaking truth to power: the human rights situation in Sri Lanka, Fr. Pancras Jordan an Australian Roman Catholic priest and is a member of Pax Christi A non-profit, non-governmental Catholic peace movement working on a global scale on a wide variety of issues in the fields of human rights, security and peace.
- The author of Sri Lanka: Untold Story, K.T.Rajasingham is a senior journalist from Sri Lanka
