= Mary Bastian =

Sri Lankan Tamil priest (1948–1985)

The Reverend Mary Bastian
- Catholic Priest
- Church: Catholic Church

Orders
- Ordination: 1975

Personal details
- Born: 1948 Jaffna, Sri Lanka
- Died: January 6, 1985 (aged 36–37) Our Lady of St. Anne's Church Vankalai, Sri Lanka

Mary Bastian (1948 – 6 January 1985) was a Sri Lankan Tamil human rights activist and Catholic priest. He was shot and killed along with 10 other civilians on January 6, 1985, during the Sri Lankan Civil War, allegedly by the Sri Lankan Army.

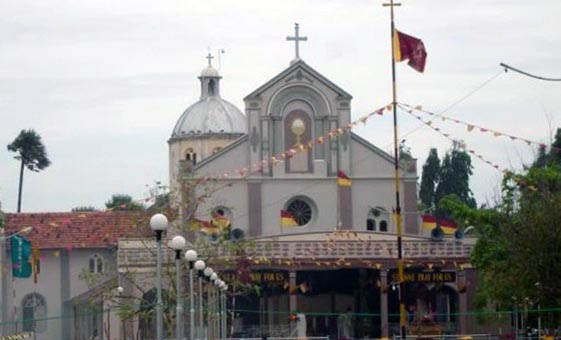
Our Lady of St. Anne's Church originally built during the Portuguese colonial period, an important landmark in Vankalai, where Fr. Mary Bastian was killed

Local memorial to Father Mary Bastian in Vankalai

== Biography ==
Mary Bastian born in Ilavalai in Jaffna district was ordained as a priest in the year 1975. He served as parish priest first at Manipay and later in Murunkan and Madhu in Mannar district.

== Background ==
During military offensives by the Sri Lankan Army in 1984 as part of the ongoing Sri Lankan civil war in Mannar region, Bastian and George Jeyarajasingham became the focal point of Human Rights activism on behalf of the local people. He was also the local contact for the Sri Lankan government appointed presidential committee to investigate Human Rights violations in the Mannar district. Jeyarajasingham of the Methodist Church was shot dead on December 13, 1984, when he was traveling in his vehicle. Later his body was burnt along with his vehicle. Bastian had collected the remains of victims including Jeyarajasingham and handed them to the Jeevothayam Methodist Centre.

== Death ==
On 6 January 1985, Bastian along with 10 others were shot allegedly by the Sri Lankan Army personnel, point blank range in front of the local St. Anne's church.

== Reactions ==
=== Sri Lankan Government ===
The National Security Minister denied that his forces had killed Bastian. The spokesperson was quoted as saying

A group of terrorists opened fire at the army unit which surrounded the church at about 11pm. In the ensuing exchange of fire, eight terrorist suspects were killed and five others captured by the armed forces. A woman and a priest are believed to have been killed in the shoot out.

On January 9, the government owned Daily News reported that, according to the Minister of National Security Lalith Athulathmudali, Bastian's body had not been found and arms and ammunition were found in the church, which the government alleged was used as a terrorist base. The minister was quoted as saying that the police had spied on Bastian getting into a boat and going across to India.

Later in a report to the United Nations, the Sri Lankan government claimed that the body of Bastian was found but the state was not involved in his murder.

=== Catholic Church ===
In a statement, reported in the Sun on January 8, Marcus Fernando, then Bishop of Chillaw and the president of the Catholic Bishops' Conference of Sri Lanka, said that reports reaching the Catholic Bishops' Conference indicated that the shooting was an unprovoked Sri Lankan Army attack on the church and the incumbent.

On January 8, Thomas Savundranayagam, the then Bishop of Mannar, in a statement to the strongly protested the insinuation by the government that arms were found in the church and he also accused the military of complicity in the murder of Father Mary Bastian.

He was quoted as saying

The Catholics of Mannar and I, bemoan the cruel, inhuman and unthinkable act against man of God. We strongly protest against the Sri Lanka Broadcasting Corporation and other means of government media, beaming out false news that, arms and ammunition were found in the Catholic church of Vankalai and that the church was used as the base to attack the security forces. We also condemn the killing of the innocent civilians in the village of Vankalai. The Catholics of Mannar and I, together with my priests, condemn all forms violence and earnestly request the government to protect the lives and property of the innocent citizens of Mannar. We are afraid that, this sort of action will escalate and the signs are clear and we request His Excellency the President to see that this does not happen.

=== Amnesty International ===
Amnesty International, the London human rights watchdog, in its report stated,

So far Amnesty International has not received any evidence in support of speculation that Fr Bastian is alive in India. His body has not been found, but there is credible evidence that Fr Bastian was shot dead by army in his mission house and that his body was removed by them from the place of the incident and disposed of. The security forces surrounded the church premises around midnight January 5–6, 1985, entered the back of the mission house, and called Fr Bastian. When he approached, he is said to have been shot through the windows from the verandah in a room at the back of the mission house. After several hours, his body was reportedly removed and put on the steps of a girls school, closed to the convent, photographed after certain objects had been put around it, and in the early hours of January 6 taken away in a white van by uniformed security forces personnel believed to be from nearby Thallady Army camp.

— Appendix IV - AI Index: ASA 37/04/85

== Memorial ==
The people of Vankalai later erected a statue of Mary Bastian in the compound of St Anne's Church in his memory.

== See also ==
- George Jeyarajasingham
- Chandra Fernando
- Nihal Jim Brown
- Mariampillai Sarathjeevan
- Eugene John Hebert
- Nicholas Pillai Pakiaranjith

== Notes ==
- The author of Speaking truth to power: the human rights situation in Sri Lanka, Fr. Pancras Jordan is an Australian Roman Catholic priest and is a member of Pax Christi, a non-profit, non-governmental Catholic peace movement working on a global scale on a wide variety of issues in the fields of human rights, security and peace.
- The author of Sri Lanka: Untold Story, K.T. Rajasingham is a senior journalist from Sri Lanka
