= A. Chandranehru =

20th and 21st-century Sri Lankan politician

Hon. Maamanithar A. Chandranehru MP
- அ. சந்திரநேரு

Member of Parliament for Ampara District
- In office 2001–2004

Personal details
- Born: 15 October 1944
- Died: 8 February 2005 (aged 60) Colombo, Sri Lanka
- Cause of death: Assassination
- Party: Illankai Tamil Arasu Kachchi
- Other political affiliations: Tamil National Alliance
- Occupation: Merchant seaman
- Ethnicity: Sri Lankan Tamil

Ariyanayagam Chandranehru (Tamil: அரியநாயகம் சந்திரநேரு; 15 October 1944 – 8 February 2005) was a Sri Lankan merchant seaman, politician and Member of Parliament.

== Early life and family ==
Chandranehru was born 15 October 1944. He was from Thirukkovil in south-eastern Ceylon. He was named after two leading Indian independence activists admired by his father – Subhas Chandra Bose and Jawaharlal Nehru.

Chandranehru was the son of K. A. W. Ariyanayagam (Arappor Ariyanayagam), one of the founders of the Illankai Tamil Arasu Kachchi (Federal Party). Ariyanayagam was a follower of the Gandhiyam way of life and took part in the non-violent civil rights protests by Tamils in the 1950s and 1960s. Chandranehru took part in the satyagrahas of 1956 and 1961. However, he, like many young Tamils, became disillusioned with non-violent protests and began to support militant armed struggle.

Chandranehru's family were protestant Christians and his brother Ruban was a Methodist pastor. Chandranehru's son Chandrakanthan is a former Member of Parliament.

== Career ==
Chandranehru joined the public service, working at the fisheries department in Kalpitiya. He then started working as a second officer on a Maldivian ship. After six years he became captain of a ship. In the mid 1980s, when he returned home for a holiday, he was arrested under the Prevention of Terrorism Act and detained at Boosa prison for more than a year. This increased his support for achieving a separate Tamil state through armed struggle. In the late 1990s he gave up shipping, returned home to Thirukkovil and became a businessman, buying several shops.

Chandranehru contested the 2001 parliamentary election as one of the Tamil National Alliance's (TNA) candidates in Ampara District. He was elected and entered Parliament. He failed to get re-elected at the 2004 parliamentary election after coming second amongst the TNA candidates. Chandranehru and others founded NESOHR (North East Secretariat on Human Rights) on 9 July 2004.

== Assassination ==
On the night of 7 February 2005 Chandranehru, along with several members of the Liberation Tigers of Tamil Eelam (LTTE), were travelling from Polonnaruwa to Thirukkovil along the Polonnaruwa-Batticaloa highway in a blue Toyota Dolphin van. At around 7.45 pm, at Pillaiyaarady near Namalgama, 40 km north-west of Batticaloa and inside government controlled territory, their vehicle was overtaken by a white van, which had been following them, which then blocked the road. Men dressed in military uniforms got out of the white van and ordered the occupants of Chandranehru's Dolphin van to get out. The two police officers providing security for Chandranehru did not resist as the men were in military uniforms. The men in military uniforms then started shooting at Chandranehru and his group. E. Kousalyan, the LTTE's political head for Batticaloa-Ampara District, and four other LTTE members (Nithimaran, Vinodhan, Kamalan and Kumanan) were killed. Chandranehru was seriously injured in the attack and was taken to hospital in Colombo National Hospital but the following day (8) he died of his injuries. The attack took place close to several Sri Lanka Army camps including Namalgama, Ruwanpitiya, Welikanda, Punanai and Kadwathmadu. The assassination was blamed on the government backed Karuna paramilitary group and the Sri Lankan military. The Tamil National Force, a TMVP (Karuna Group)/ENDLF front, claimed responsibility for the attack.

On 12 February 2005 the LTTE conferred the title Maamanithar (great human being) on Chandranehru.

== Electoral history ==
Electoral history of A. Chandranehru
Election	Constituency	Party	Votes	Result
2001 parliamentary	Ampara District	TNA	26,282	Elected
2004 parliamentary	Ampara District	TNA	25,572	Not elected
