= Kiddinan Sivanesan =

Sri Lankan politician (1957 - 2008)

Hon. Maamanithar Kiddinan Sivanesan MP
- கி. சிவநேசன்
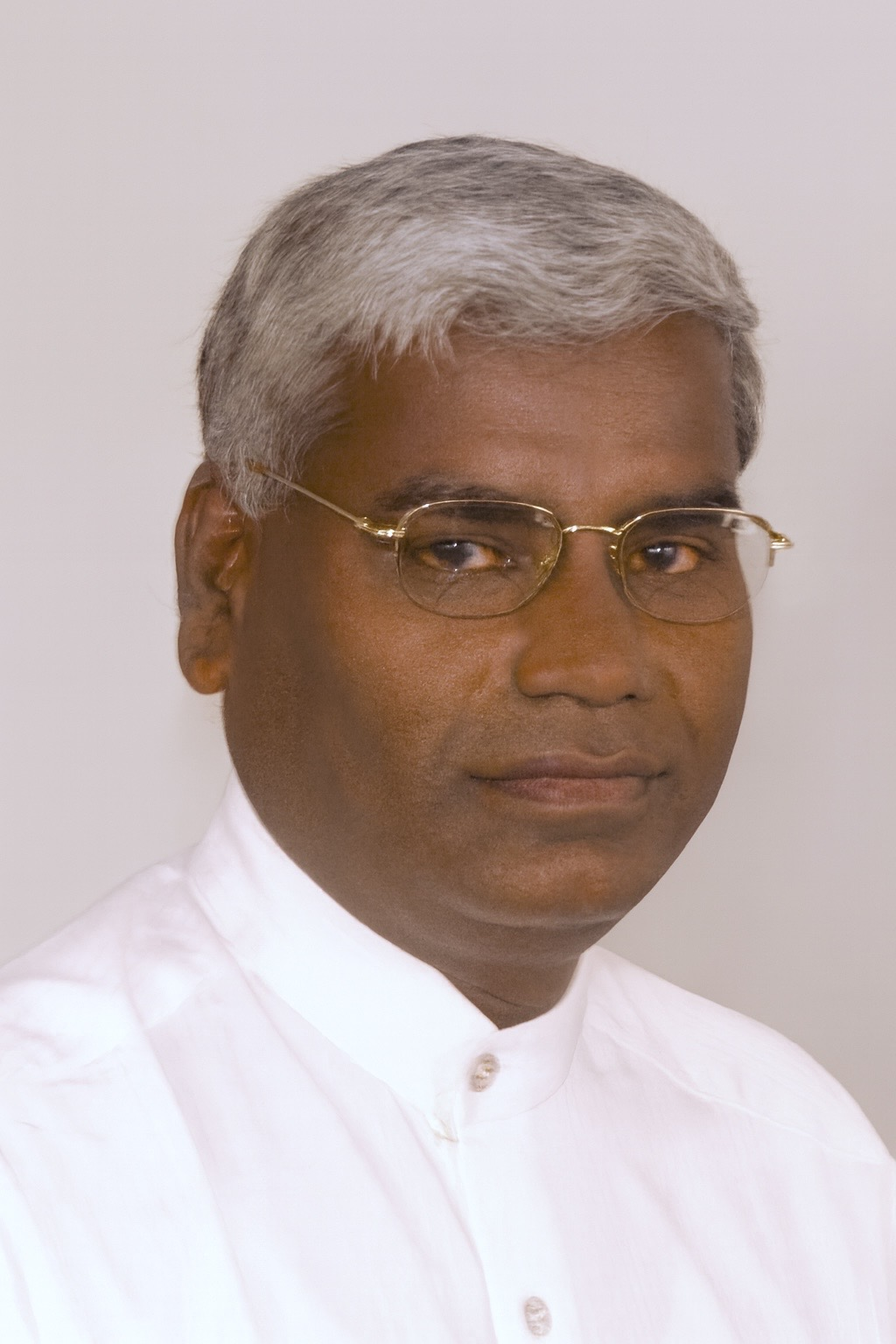
- Kiddinan Sivanesan

Member of Parliament for Jaffna District
- In office 2004–2008
- Majority: Tamil

Personal details
- Born: 21 January 1957 Karaveddy East
- Died: 6 March 2008 (aged 51) A9 highway, Maankulam, Sri Lanka
- Party: Tamil National Alliance
- Occupation: Civil servant

Kiddinan Sivanesan (Tamil: கிட்டிணன் சிவனேசன் (Kiţţiṇaņ Civaņēcaņ); 21 January 1957 – 6 March 2008) was a Sri Lankan Tamil politician and former Member of Parliament. He was killed by a roadside bomb alleged to have been planted by the Sri Lanka Army's Long Range Reconnaissance Patrol (Deep Penetration Unit).

== Early life ==
Sivanesan was born on 21 January 1957 and spent his early life in Karaveddy, Jaffna District. He studied at Nelliyadi Maththiya Mahaa Viththiyaalayam. He established a number of Palmyrah Development Societies and Coconut Development Societies in Jaffna Peninsula. Sivanesan and his family moved to Mallavi when the A9 highway was closed. Between 1996 and 2004 he was general manager of Northern Region Palm Development Co-op Society.

== Political career ==
At the April 2004 parliamentary election Sivanesan was elected to represent the Jaffna District in Parliament.

== Assassination ==
On 6 March 2008 Sivanesan was travelling north along the A9 highway to his home in Mallavi after attending Parliament in Colombo. He crossed the frontline checkpoint at Omanthai, Vavuniya District and entered the territory controlled by the Liberation Tigers of Tamil Eelam. Thirty minutes later, at around 1:20pm, when Sivanesan's vehicle was near Maankulam, Mullaitivu District, some 35 kilometres (22 mi) north of the Omanthai checkpoint, four claymore mines exploded in a row. Sivanesan's driver Periyannan Maheswararajah was killed on the spot. Sivanesan was taken to Maankulam hospital but died of his injuries.

The Tamil National Alliance immediately blamed the Sri Lankan government security forces for the assassination. They claimed that Sri Lankan Army's Long Range Reconnaissance Patrol had carried out the attack. Sivanesan had alleged that he had been harassed by Sri Lankan Army earlier. His vehicle had previously been targeted by claymore mines in 2007. The army has denied the allegation.

On 7 March 2008 the Tamil Tigers conferred the title Maamanithar (great human being) on Sivanesan.

== See also ==
- List of assassinations of the Sri Lankan Civil War
