= List of Sri Lankan Tamils =

This is a list of notable Tamils of Sri Lanka by their country of domicile or origin. All communities that speak (or spoke) Tamil and originally came from Sri Lanka are included. Tamils of Sri Lanka today are a trans-national minority and are found across the globe.

== Sri Lanka ==
=== Academics ===
- Rev. Fr. (Dr.) H. S. David - Priest, Scholar and Linguist who died of shock the next day after seeing flames engulfing Jaffna Library from his room at St. Patrick's College, Jaffna the night before.
- Srikanthalakshmi Arulanandam - Principle Librarian at the University of Jaffna
- A. Thurairajah - Professor, Vice Chancellor of University of Peradeniya, Civil Engineer (Akbar Bridge in University of Peradeniya was constructed by him), Founder of Thurai Law ( About Soil)
- T. Nadaraja - Chancellor of the University of Jaffna; Professor and Dean of the Faculty of Law, University of Ceylon
- S. Raveendranath - Vice-Chancellor of the Eastern University of Sri Lanka
- K. Sivathamby - emeritus professor of University of Jaffna; prominent Tamil scholar, sociologist and author of books
- X. Thaninayagam - scholar, author and historian
- Valentine Joseph - was a Sri Lankan Tamil mathematician, noted for his contributions to education
- Rajini Thiranagama - murdered human rights activist and author of books; head of the Department of Anatomy, University of Jaffna; member of University Teachers for Human Rights assassinated by Tamil Tigers.
- T. Varagunam - Chancellor of the Eastern University of Sri Lanka
- Dr. W. S. Santharaj - Consultant Cardiologist

=== Activists ===
- Fr. Mary Bastian - Roman Catholic parish priest and human rights activist
- Fr. Thiruchelvam Nihal Jim Brown - Roman Catholic parish priest and activist; missing since August 20, 2006; presumed dead
- Radhika Coommaraswamy - human rights activist; Under-Secretary-General of the United Nations and Special Representative for Children and Armed Conflict
- Richard de Zoysa - journalist, author, human rights activist and actor; was abducted and brutally killed by Sri Lankan government paramilitary forces during the JVP insurrection; of Tamil and Singhala mixed origin; son of Manorani Sarawanamuttu
- Rev. Chandra Fernando - Roman Catholic parish priest, human rights activist; Batticaloa Citizens Committee member; murdered
- Rajan Hoole - professor of Department of Mathematics, University of Jaffna; human rights activist; author of books; member of University Teachers for Human Rights
- Kethesh Loganathan - Deputy Secretary General of the Peace Secretariat of the Government of Sri Lanka; assassinated
- Rajini Thiranagama - murdered human rights activist and author of books; head of the Department of Anatomy, University of Jaffna; member of University Teachers for Human Rights
- Chelvy Thiyagarajah - feminist and International PEN award winner

=== Actors and directors ===
- Rukmani Devi - popular film actress
- Suresh Joachim film actor and producer
- Chandran Rutnam - film producer / director

=== Sri Lankan international and first class cricketers, umpires, and administrators ===
- Russel Arnold - former Sri Lankan Test cricketer and international commentator
- Roy Dias - former Sri Lankan Test cricketer/vice captain
- Kandiah Thirugnansampandapillai Francis - international Test/ODI umpire
- S. Illangaratnam - late Sri Lankan cricketer, stalwart of Moratuwa and Bloomfield cricket clubs prior to the Test match era and the coach of Bloomfield C&AC
- Pradeep Jayaprakashdaran - Sri Lankan One Day International (ODI) cricket player
- Sridharan Jeganathan - late NCC and Sri Lankan Test cricketer/off spin bowler
- Vinothen John - former NCC and Sri Lankan Test cricketer/opening fast medium bowler
- Angelo Mathews - Sri Lankan all rounder and former captain of the Sri Lankan cricket team
- Selliah Ponnadurai - late international cricket umpire
- Ravindra Pushpakumara - Karupiah Raveendra Pushpakumara, born to a Tamil father and Sinhala mother
- Ravi Ratnayeke (Joseph Raveendran Ratnayeke) - former Sri Lankan vice captain; Tamil-Sinhala mixed
- Mahadevan Sathasivam - cricket batsman
- Mario Villavarayan - former NCC and first class cricketer
- Suthershini Sivanantham - Sri Lankan women's cricketer

=== Other athletes and sports people ===
- Nagalingam Ethirveerasingam - high jumper; v Olympic Games and Asian Games; winner of Ceylon's first gold medal in international track and field competition (high jump, 1958 Asian Games)
- Sujan Perera, footballer
- Sunil Roshan Appuhamy
- Adhavan Rajamohan, footballer
- Jason Thayaparan, footballer
- Sam Durrant, footballer
- Anujan Rajendram, footballer

=== Authors, writers, poets and artists ===
- V. Akilesapillai - author, scholar, poet and Hindu activist
- Ananda Coomaraswamy - Orientalist, author, philosopher and metaphysician
- V. V. Ganeshananthan - author, scholar, and professor
- Dominic Jeeva - author and social activist
- S. Kanapathipillai - scholar
- Muttukumara Kavirajar - poet and Hindu activist
- Kumaraswamy Pulavar - scholar, poet and Hindu activist
- D. Raja Segar - painter and sculptor
- Tharshan Selvarajah - chef
- SJ Sindu - author, scholar, and professor
- Alagu Subramaniam - Writer, a prominent figure in London's Bloomsbury literary circle, a Barrister-at-Law of The Honourable Society of Lincoln's Inn, and an Advocate of the Supreme Court of Ceylon
- C. W. Thamotharampillai - editor and publisher of classical Tamil poetry and grammar; the oldest extant written work in Tamil, Tolkapiyam - Porulathikaram, was discovered and published by him with a commentary

=== Business people ===
- Ken Balendra - Sri Lankan corporate leader and executive; holds and has held many corporate positions in Sri Lanka and the region
- Chandran Rutnam - filmmaker and owner of Lionair
- Suresh Joachim- is well known as the co-founder of WBBAS, No Poverty No Disease No War, World Peace Marathon and Suresh Joachim International Group Of Companies.

=== Diplomats ===
- Yogendra Duraiswamy - first batch of Ceylon Overseas Service, 1949
- Tamara Kunanayakam - Sri Lankan Ambassador to Cuba (2008-2009); Permanent Representative of Sri Lanka to the United Nations Office at Geneva

=== Historical figures ===
- Arumaipperumal - Batticaloa chieftain who led a rebellion against the British colonial occupiers in 1803
- Cankili I (Sankili Segarajasekaran) - a prominent king of the Jaffna Kingdom
- Cankili II - last king of the Jaffna kingdom
- Migapulle Arachchi - Feudal lord of Jaffna Kingdom who rebelled against the Portuguese colonial occupiers in 1620.
- Pandara Vannian (Kulasegaram Vairamuthu Pandaravanniyan) - Vanni chieftain who challenged British rule

=== Tamil historical figures who ruled the Sinhalese kingdom ===
- Sena and Guttika - Tamil horse merchants who ascended the throne in Anuradhapura, 237-215 BC
- Ellalan - ruled Anuradhapura from 205 BC to 161 BC; considered a most impartial and just monarch
- Pulahatta - Tamil king, ruled from Anuradhapura 103 -100 BC
- Bahiya - Tamil king, ruled from Anuradhapura 100-98 BC
- Panya Mara - Tamil king, ruled from Anuradhapura 98-91 BC
- Pilaya Mara - Tamil King, ruled from Anuradapura 91-90 BC
- Dathiya - Tamil King of Anuradhapura 447-450 AD
- Pandu - Tamil king from 436 to 441 BC
- Parindu - son of Pandu, ruled for one year, 441 BC
- Khudda Parinda - brother of Pandu, ruled 441-447 BC
- Tiritara - 447 BC
- Dathiya - 447-450 BC
- Pithiya - 450-452
- Chempaha Perumal - a Jaffna Tamil who ascended the Sinhala throne as King Bhuvanekabahu VI of Kotte

=== Journalists and broadcasters ===
- S. P. Mylvaganam - first Tamil announcer of the Commercial Service of Radio Ceylon
- A. Nadesan - murdered Virakesari newspaper journalist
- M. Nimalrajan - murdered journalist, BBC reporter
- K. S. Raja - Radio Ceylon announcer
- Claude Selveratnam - Radio Ceylon announcer
- Kailayar Sellanainar Sivakumaran - broadcaster and Journalist in English and Tamil
- Taraki Sivaram - journalist, military analyst editor of TamilNet news website, author of books
- J. S. Tissainayagam - journalist and first winner of the Peter Mackler Award for Courageous and Ethical Journalism

=== Lawyers and judges ===
- V. Casipillai - Crown Proctor, President of the Jaffna Hindu Board, co-founder of Jaffna Hindu College, founder of Parvathy Maha Vidyalayam and other educational institutions
- Prabaharan Kumararatnam – Sri Lankan judge of the Court of Appeal
- V. Manicavasagar - Puisne justice of the Supreme Court of Sri Lanka, Chancellor of the University of Jaffna and Chairman of the Commercial Bank of Ceylon
- K. Kanag-Isvaran - Lawyer and President's Counsel
- Annalingam Premashankar – Judge of the Court of Appeal
- S. Selliah - Judge of the Court of Appeal, Judge of the High Court, Magistrate
- S. Sharvananda - 37th Chief Justice of Sri Lanka, Puisne justice of the Supreme Court of Sri Lanka and Governor of the Western Province
- K. Sripavan - 44th Chief justice of Sri Lanka
- H. D. Thambiah - Judge of the Court of Appeal, Puisne justice of the Supreme Court and 39th Chief Justice of Sri Lanka
- H. W. Thambiah - Puisne Justice of the Supreme Court

=== Militants and rebels ===
- Velupillai Prabhakaran (Karikalan) - Leader of the LTTE and of the de facto state of Tamil Eelam till 2009.
- Charles Lucas Anthony (Seelan) - senior Tamil Tiger commander
- V. Baheerathakumar (Theepan) - senior Tamil Tiger commander, de facto military leader
- V. Balakumaran - former leader of Eelam Revolutionary Organisation of Students, later joined the Tamil Tigers
- Anton Balasingham - chief political strategist and chief negotiator for the Tamil Tigers
- S. Chandrakanthan (Pillayan) - Tamil Tiger member, defected to the Sri Lankan Government; Chief Minister of the Eastern Province
- Douglas Devananda - Tiger deserter; former militant turned politician; founder and leader of the Eelam People's Democratic Party political party and a pro-government paramilitary organization; Government Minister and Member of Parliament
- B. Kandiah (Balraj) - senior Tamil Tiger commander
- S. Krishnakumar (Kittu) - senior Tamil Tiger commander
- G. Mahendraraja (Mahattaya) - Deputy Leader of the Tamil Tigers and head of the People's Front of Liberation Tigers
- V. Muralitharan (Karuna Amman) - senior Tamil Tiger commander, defected to the Sri Lankan Government; Government Minister and appointed Member of Parliament
- B. Nadesan - Tamil Tiger political leader
- A. Neminathan (CRaju) - senior Tamil Tiger commander
- R. Parthipan (Thileepan) - Tamil Tiger political wing member who died during a hunger strike
- S. Pathmanathan (KP) - senior Tamil Tiger member; now collaborating with the Sri Lankan government
- Arul Pragasam - founder and leader of Eelam Revolutionary Organisation of Students
- Thenmozhi Rajaratnam - assassin who killed Rajiv Gandhi
- E. Ratnasabapathy - founder member of Eelam Revolutionary Organisation of Students
- S. Ravishankar (Charles) - Tamil Tiger military intelligence wing leader
- Sri Sabaratnam - leader of Tamil Eelam Liberation Organization
- T. Sivanesan ( Soosai) - Tamil Tiger Sea Wing leader
- P. Sivaparan (Nediyawan) - senior Tamil Tiger member
- S. Sivashankar (Pottu Amman) - Tamil Tigers Intelligence Wing leader, was number 2 in the organisation
- V. Sornalingam (Shankar) - founder of Sea Tigers and Air Tigers wing of the Tamil Tigers
- S. P. Thamilselvan - Tamil Tiger political leader
- N. Thangathurai - co-founder and leader of Tamil Eelam Liberation Organization
- K. Ulaganathan (Ramanan) - senior Tamil Tiger commander
- V. Vasanthan (Miller) - first Black Tiger
- S. Yogachandran (Kuttimani) - co-founder and leader of Tamil Eelam Liberation Organization

=== Military ===
- Air Vice Marshal P.B. Premachandra - former Chief of Staff, Sri Lanka Air Force
- Air Vice Marshal Ravi Arunthavanathan - former Deputy Chief of Staff, Sri Lanka Air Force and current Additional Secretary, Ministry of Defence
- Major General Y. Balaretnarajah, Vishista Seva Vibhushanaya, Uttama Seva Padakkama, National Defence College, India, Sri Lanka Armoured Corps - Chief of Staff, Sri Lanka Army (1992-1992)
- Rear Admiral Rajan Kadiragamar, Royal Victorian Order, Royal Ceylon Navy - former Commander of the Sri Lankan Navy
- Air Vice Marshal A. Kumaresan, Rana Sura Padakkama, Uttama Seva Padakkama, Psc (British Army), Sri Lanka Air Force - current Director of Planning, Sri Lanka Air Force
- Major General Anton Muttukumaru, OBE, Efficiency Decoration; Aide-de-camp, Ceylon Light Infantry; first Ceylonese Commander of the Sri Lanka Army
- Vice Admiral Travis Sinniah, Weera Wickrama Vibhushanaya, Rana Wickrama Padakkama, Rana Sura Padakkama, Uttama Seva Padakkama, ndu - 21st Commander of the Sri Lanka Navy, veteran of attack flotilla
- Major General E. G. Thevanayagam, Vishista Seva Vibhushanaya - Commandant of the Sri Lanka Army Volunteer Force (1984–1986)
- Major General Chelliah Thurairaja, Uttama Seva Padakkama, Sri Lanka Army Medical Corps - former Director Army Medical Services and Colonel Commandant Sri Lanka Army Medical Corps
- Colonel David Rockwood, KStJ, ED, JP - Deputy Commandant of the Volunteer Force

=== Politicians ===
- Selvam Adaikalanathan - President of the Tamil Eelam Liberation Organization and Member of Parliament
- A. Amirthalingam - leader of the Tamil United Liberation Front, Leader of the Opposition and Member of Parliament
- V. Anandasangaree - leader of the Tamil United Liberation Front and Member of Parliament
- Sir Ponnambalam Arunachalam CCS - pre-independence politician and civil servant; Registrar General; member of Executive Council of Ceylon; member of Legislative Council of Ceylon
- A. Canagaratnam - member of the Legislative Council of Ceylon, Chairman of the first Urban Council of Jaffna; founder of Canagaratnam Maha Vidyalayam (formerly Stanley College) in Jaffna
- S. J. V. Chelvanayakam - political leader of the Sri Lankan Tamil people; founder and leader of the Illankai Tamil Arasu Kachchi (Federal Party); leader of the Tamil United Liberation Front; Member of Parliament
- A. Coomaraswamy - member of the Legislative Council of Ceylon
- Sir Muthu Coomaraswamy - member of the Legislative Council of Ceylon; first Asian to be knighted; father of author Ananda Coomaraswamy
- Douglas Devananda - Militant turned politician; founder and leader of the Eelam People's Democratic Party paramilitary group; Government Minister and Member of Parliament
- K. W. Devanayagam - former minister, Member of Parliament, lawyer who represented Kalkudah seat
- Waithilingam Duraiswamy - pre-independence Sri Lankan lawyer, politician and speaker of the State Council of Ceylon
- Alfred Duraiappah - Member of Parliament from 1960 to 1964; Mayor of Jaffna
- Jeyaraj Fernandopulle - slain SLFP politician, a Negombo chetty
- Mano Ganesan - leader of the Democratic People's Front political party; Member of Parliament; member of Western Provincial Council
- Praba Ganeshan - MP
- Lakshman Kadirgamar - Minister of Foreign Affairs; nominated Member of Parliament
- N. Kumaraguruparan - General Secretary of Democratic People's Front political party; General Secretary and Senior Vice President of All Ceylon Tamil Congress; member of the Colombo Municipal Council; member of Western Provincial Council
- Sir Arunachalam Mahadeva - Minister of Home Affairs; member of the State Council of Ceylon; member of the Legislative Council of Ceylon
- S. Nadesan - member of the State Council of Ceylon, Member of Parliament, Senator
- Joseph Pararajasingham - Member of Parliament
- C. Ponnambalam - first Mayor of Jaffna
- G. G. Ponnambalam - political leader of the Sri Lankan Tamil people; founder and leader of the All Ceylon Tamil Congress; government minister and Member of Parliament
- Kumar Ponnambalam - Nationalist politician and human rights activist; leader of All Ceylon Tamil Congress; presidential candidate
- Suresh Premachandran - leader of the Eelam People's Revolutionary Liberation Front and Member of Parliament
- Sir Ponnambalam Ramanathan - pre-independence politician and political leader of the Sri Lankan Tamil people; Solicitor General of Ceylon; member of Legislative Council of Ceylon
- N. Raviraj - Member of Parliament
- James T. Rutnam - historian, educationalist, author and politician
- A. Sabapathy - member of Legislative Council of Ceylon; one of the founders of Jaffna Hindu College; editor of Hindu Organ; President of Jaffna Association
- T. M. Sabaratnam - member of Legislative Council of Ceylon; President of the Vattrapalai Kannagi Amman Kovil Trust
- R. Sampanthan - Leader of Tamil National Alliance political party; Member of Parliament
- S. Sellamuttu, OBE - Colombo mayor, 1951
- N. Shanmugathasan - General Secretary of the Ceylon Communist Party (Maoist)
- C. Sittampalam - Minister of Posts and Telecommunications in the first Cabinet of independent Ceylon; Member of Parliament
- S. Sivamaharajah - Member of Parliament; managing director of Namathu Eelanadu
- M. Sivasithamparam - Deputy Speaker of the Parliament
- C. Suntharalingam - Government Minister and Member of Parliament
- Bala Tampoe - veteran trade unionist; General Secretary of the Ceylon Mercantile, Industrial and General Workers Union
- Arumugam Thondaman - leader of the CWC
- S. Thondaman - leader of the Ceylon Workers' Congress, Government Minister, Member of Parliament
- Murugeysen Tiruchelvam - Government Minister and Senator
- Neelan Tiruchelvam - Member of Parliament
- Sir Kanthiah Vaithianathan KBE CCS - Minister for Housing, Industry and Social Service; first Permanent Secretary to the Ministry of External Affairs and Defence (1947–1952); Senator
- A. Vinayagamoorthy - President of All Ceylon Tamil Congress and Member of Parliament
- Sarojini Yogeswaran - Mayor of Jaffna
- V. Yogeswaran - co-leader of the Tamil United Liberation Front and Member of Parliament

=== Religious figures ===
- Arumuka Navalar - Hindu reformer and author of books from Jaffna
- Swami Vipulananda - Hindu reformer and author of books
- Yogaswami - Hindu ascetic from Jaffna

=== Scientists ===
- Nallamma Williams (born 1880) - early female medical doctor

== Australia ==
=== Activists ===
- Christie Jayaratnam Eliezer - Professor of Mathematics in University of Ceylon, University of Malaya and La Trobe University in Australia; recipient of Order of Australia

=== Business people ===
- Maha Sinnathamby - property developer; the man behind Australia's largest real estate project; frequently listed in BRW's annual list of the 200 richest Australians
- Jitto Arulampalam - A business executive, investor, and entrepreneur known for his venture capital, mining, and fintech activities, including board-level roles in publicly listed Australian companies

=== Singers ===
- Kamahl (Kandiah Kamalesvaran) - singer
- Dhee (Dheekshitha Venkadeshan) - singer

=== Sportspeople ===
- Nishan Velupillay - footballer for Melbourne Victory FC

== Canada ==
=== Academics ===
- Alfred Jeyaratnam Wilson - peacemaker, politician and author of books on Sri Lanka

=== Actors and directors ===
- Rohan Fernando - filmmaker born in Jaffna
- Lenin M. Sivam - film director; directed the critically acclaimed film 1999
- Maitreyi Ramakrishnan- actress; Never Have I Ever
- Rajiv Surendra - actor, artist and author

=== Athletes and sports people ===
- Trevin Bastiampillai - Canadian cricketer
- Manoj David - Canadian cricketer
- Arvind Kandappah - Canadian cricketer
- Sanjayan Thuraisingam - Canadian cricketer
- Suresh Joachim - Multiple Guinness World Record Holder

=== Authors, writers, poets and musicians ===
- Shyam Selvadurai - author of Funny Boy and Cinnamon Gardens
- SJ Sindu - author of Marriage of a Thousand Lies, professor at the University of Toronto Scarborough

=== Business people ===
- Roy Ratnavel - Business executive and the author of the book Prisoner #1056.

=== Politicians ===
- Gary Anandasangaree - MP for Scarborough-Rouge Park
- Vijay Thanigasalam - MPP for Scarborough-Rouge Park
- Logan Kanapathi - MPP for Markham-Thornhill, former Markham City Councillor, first Tamil Canadian elected to political office (2006)
- Neethan Shan - former Toronto City Councillor
- Rathika Sitsabaiesan - former Canadian politician from Toronto; the New Democratic Party (NDP) Member of Parliament for Scarborough-Rouge River; the first Tamil elected to the Canadian Parliament

== India ==
=== Actors and directors ===
- Poongkothai Chandrahasan - actress and Harvard-trained filmmaker
- Suresh Joachim - actor, producer, and singer
- Balu Mahendra - prominent Kollywood film director

=== Authors, writers, poets and artists ===
- V. Kanakasabhai - lawyer, historian and Dravidologist of Sri Lankan Tamil descent

=== Politicians ===
- E. M. V. Naganathan - one of the founders of the Illankai Tamil Arasu Kachchi (Federal Party); Member of Parliament

=== Athletes ===
- Anand Amritraj

== Malaysia ==
=== Academics ===
- Shan Ratnam - professor and researcher

=== Athletes and sports people ===
- Punch Gunalan - former national badminton player and IBF Executive Deputy President
- Mahadevan Sathasivam - former captain of the Malaysian cricket team
- K. Gurusamy - Malaysian Footballer

=== Authors, writers, poets and artists ===
- Rani Manicka - writer
- Manicasothy Saravanamuttu - editor of The Straits Echo in Malaya (1931–1941); credited with 'saving' Penang during Japanese invasion in 1941; author of The Sara Saga

=== Business people ===
- Vijay Eswaran - Group MD; CEO of the QI Group of companies
- Tan Sri G. Gnanalingam - executive chairman of Westport; ranked 29th in the 2007 Forbes Asia List of the 40 Richest Malaysians
- Ananda Krishnan - Malaysia's richest man and 62nd Richest Man in the world according to the 2009 Forbes Billionaire List
- Bastianpillai Paul Nicholas - the first non-British businessman who endeavoured to become one of the top bankers in the then Malaya

=== Civil servants ===
- Tan Sri Dr Ramon Navaratnam - Malaysian economist

=== Politicians ===
- Tan Sri Devaki Krishnan - former politician
- Sivarasa Rasiah - human rights lawyer and vice-president of the opposition Parti Keadilan Rakyat (People's Justice Party)
- D. R. Seenivasagam - founder of People's Progressive Party in Malaysia
- Datuk Dr S Vijayaratnam - former Parti Gerakan Rakyat Malaysia Vice-president

== Singapore ==
=== Academics ===
- Philip Jeyaretnam - professor of law; member of Public Service Commission
- Shan Ratnam - former Head of Department of Obstetrics & Gynaecology at the National University of Singapore

=== Authors, writers, poets and artists ===
- Edwin Thumboo - poet

=== Civil servants ===
- K. S. Rajah - former Supreme Court Judge

=== Politicians ===
- Joshua Benjamin Jeyaretnam - former Solicitor General and perennial opposition politician of the Workers' Party of Singapore
- Sinnathamby Rajaratnam - politician, deputy prime minister, one of the founding fathers of Singapore
- Tharman Shanmugaratnam - politician and President of Singapore

== United Kingdom ==
=== Academics ===
- Ganesh Sittampalam - Guinness World Record holder as the youngest person in the UK to pass an A-Level in 1988, aged only nine years and four months old at the time
- Sabaratnam Arulkumaran - is a Sri Lankan Tamil physician, former president of the Royal College of Obstetricians and Gynaecologists and the International Federation of Gynaecology and Obstetrics, and president-elect of the British Medical Association.
- Maheshi N. Ramasamy - is a British-Sri Lankan physician and lecturer. She is currently working as one of the chief investigators at the Oxford Vaccine Group.

=== Activists ===
- S. J. Emmanuel - priest, academic, and activist; President of the Global Tamil Forum; Vicar General of the Jaffna Diocese

=== Actors/actresses ===
- Amara Karan, British actress, whose parents moved to the UK from Zambia for work.
- Teejay Arunasalam, Tamil British actor

=== Athletes and sports people ===
- Dimitri Mascarenhas - international cricketer, plays for England; born to Sri Lankan Bharatakula Tamil parents in the UK, brought up in Australia and the UK
- Murugan Thiruchelvam - British child prodigy chess player
- Sam Durrant - Footballer for Karvan and Sri Lanka. First Sri Lankan Tamil descent to play professional football in England.
- Vimal Yoganathan - Footballer for Barnsley FC

=== Comedians ===
- Romesh Ranganathan - British comedian and actor from Crawley

=== Musicians and singers ===
- Arjun - recording artist, born to a Tamil father
- M.I.A. (Mathangi "Maya" Arulpragasam) - British rapper, singer, songwriter, record producer, and fashion designer
- Siva Kaneswaran - member of the English-Irish boy band The Wanted, born to a Tamil father
- Ashan Pillai- British violist and professor

=== Journalists and broadcasters ===
- George Alagiah - BBC reporter and journalist
- James Coomarasamy - BBC reporter and journalist
- Dharshini David - BBC reporter and journalist
- Tim Kash - MTV and BBC reporter and journalist

=== Politicians ===
- Thangam Debbonaire - Labour Party MP, born to a mixed Indian-Sri Lankan Tamil father
- Dileeni Daniel-Selvaratnam, Governor of Anguilla

== United States ==
=== Academics ===
- Stanley Jeyaraja Tambiah - retired Harvard University professor of anthropology and author of several books

=== Authors, writers, poets and artists ===
- Mary Anne Mohanraj - Sri Lankan-born writer, editor, and academic

=== Business people ===
- Kavichandran Alexander (Kavi Alexander) - owner of US record label Water Lily Acoustics; engineer; won 1993 Grammy Award for Ry Cooder's album A Meeting by the River
- Sanjay Kumar - former Chief Executive of Computer Associates
- Kumar Mahadeva - former Chief Executive of Cognizant Technology Solutions
- Raj Rajaratnam - hedge fund manager and the founder and Managing General Partner of The Galleon Group; on Forbes' Richest Americans List

=== Musicians and singers ===
- Clarence Jey - songwriter and composer for US Late Night host Jimmy Fallon's 2013 Grammy-winning record Blow Your Pants Off; songwriter and producer for Emmy-winning US TV animation series Growing Up Creepie; producer and songwriter for Rebecca Black's viral hit song "Friday"

=== Politicians ===
- V. Rudrakumaran - Prime Minister of the Transnational Government of Tamil Eelam

== Norway ==
=== Actors and directors ===
- Tamiliam Subas - film director; directed the critically acclaimed short film Vanni Mouse

== See also ==
- Tamil diaspora
