= List of British Sri Lankans =

List of notable people of Sri Lankan descent living in the United Kingdom

This is a list of notable people of Sri Lankan descent living in the United Kingdom. The term "Sri Lankan Britons" refers to Sri Lankans of all ethnic groups.

== Academic ==
- Nishan Canagarajah - British Tamil academic and the current president and vice-chancellor of the University of Leicester.Abhaya Induruwa
- Sunitha Wickramasinghe - Sri Lankan Born British former Deputy Dean of the Imperial College School of Medicine
- Sujit Sivasundaram - Professor of World History, University of Cambridge; Fellow British Academy.

== Actors ==
- Jai Akash
- Tony Jayawardena
- Amara Karan
- Indy Lewis
- Albert Moses
- Romesh Ranganathan – stand-up comedian, actor, presenter
- Anneika Rose
- Nethra Tilakumara
- Kim Vithana

== Business ==
- Subaskaran Allirajah – businessman, entrepreneur, founder of the Lycamobile; the world's largest MVNO based in the UK
- Karunamoorthy – film producer, founder of Ayngaran International
- Arjuna Sittampalam – financier
- Ratheesan Yoganathan – entrepreneur, founder of the Lebara

== Engineers ==
- Cecil Balmond
- Shini Somara
- Kanagaratnam Sriskandan

== Lawyers ==
- Desmond Lorenz de Silva

== Media ==
- George Alagiah
- Nigel Barker
- Suranga Chandratillake
- James Coomarasamy
- Rasantha Cooray
- Vernon Corea
- Darshini David
- Elmo Fernando
- Christopher Greet
- Rohan Jayasekera
- Neville Jayaweera
- Tim Kash

== Military ==
- Jack Churchill
- Cyril Nicholas

== Musicians ==
- Arjun Coomaraswamy
- Beverley Craven
- Rohan de Saram
- Desmond de Silva
- Tanya Ekanayaka – composer, pianist
- Siva Kaneswaran
- Lay Low
- M.I.A.
- Nimal Mendis
- Andrew Nethsingha – choral conductor, organist
- DJ Nihal
- Ashan Pillai – violinist

== Physicians ==
- Sir Sabaratnam Arulkumaran
- Henry Speldewinde de Boer
- Ajith Kumar Siriwardena
- Richard Lionel Spittel

== Politicians ==
- Desmond Lorenz de Silva
- Nirj Deva
- Jan Jananayagam
- Ranil Jayawardena
- Alexander Robert Johnston

== Religion ==
- Kamal Chunchie
- Bogoda Seelawimala Nayaka Thera
- Lakshman Wickremasinghe

== Scientists ==
- Suran Goonatilake
- Cyril Ponnamperuma
- Chandra Wickramasinghe

== Sports ==
=== Cricket ===
- Alistair Blair - Ceylonese Cricketer, Born in British Ceylon and represented the Ceylon National Cricket Team.
- Jude Chaminda - Played First-class cricket in Wales.
- Dimitri Mascarenhas - English Cricketer of Sri Lankan Descent and played Hampshire and represented the England Cricket Team.
- Gehan Mendis - English and Sri Lankan Cricketer who played for Sussex and Lancashire.
- Walter Philps - Ceylonese Cricketer who played for Buckinghamshire.
- Glucka Wijesuriya - English and Sri Lankan Cricketer who played for Suffolk.

=== Football ===
- Dillon De Silva - winger for Sutton United and the Sri Lankan National Team.
- Sam Durrant - plays as a winger for Dundalk.
- Vimal Yoganathan - plays as a midfielder for Barnsley and Wales U19.
- Nikki Ahmed - former midfielder who played for Chelsea and FSV Frankfurt.
- Marvin Hamilton - midfielder for Hythe Town and the Sri Lanka National Team.

=== Other ===
- Murugan Thiruchelvam - Chess Played
- Duncan White - British Ceylon born Olympic Athlete who represented Ceylon at the 1948 Summer Olympics in London, where he won a Silver Medal and became the first Ceylonese/Sri Lankan to win a medal in the Modern day Olympics.

== Writers ==
- Mahinda Deegalle
- Rohan Jayasekera
- Michael Ondaatje
- Christine Pillainayagam
- Nadarajah Selvarajah
- Ambalavaner Sivanandan

== Others ==
- Kali Arulpragasam
- Peter Kuruvita
- Sir Christopher Ondaatje
- Ganesh Sittampalam
- Anton Balasingham

== See also ==
- List of Sri Lankans
