= Lanka Graphite =

Sri Lankan mining company

Lanka Graphite Limited
- Type: Public
- Industry: Mining
- Founded: 2015
- Headquarters: Melbourne, Victoria, Australia
- Key people: Jitto Arulampalam; Executive Chairman Emily Lee; Managing Director
- Website: lankagraphite.com.au

Lanka Graphite Limited is a company engaged in the mining of graphite in Sri Lanka.

It was listed on the Australian Securities Exchange in August 2015, and de-listed on August 4, 2020.
