= Selvarajah =

Selvarajah may refer to

- Nadarajah Selvarajah, Sri Lankan Tamil writer
- Selvarasa Pathmanathan, Tamil rebel also known as Selvarajah Pathmanathan.
- Selvarajah Yogachandran, Tamil rebel known as Kuttimani
- Selvarajah Rajivarnam, Sri Lankan Tamil journalist.
- Relangi Selvarajah, Sri Lankan Tamil broadcaster
- Selvarajah Kajendran, Sri Lankan Tamil politician.
