= S. A. Raheem =

Sri Lankan politician (1921–1989)

Hon. S. A. Raheem MP
- எஸ். ஏ. ரகீம்

Member of Parliament for Mannar
- In office 1974–1977
- Preceded by: V. A. Alegacone
- Succeeded by: P. S. Soosaithasan

Sri Lankan High Commissioner to Kenya

Personal details
- Born: 9 August 1921
- Died: 1989
- Party: United National Party
- Education: St. Xavier's Boys' College; Jaffna Central College; Jaffna College

Seyadu Abdul Raheem (Tamil: செய்யது அப்துல் ரகீம்; 9 August 1921 – 1989) was a Sri Lankan Muslim diplomat, politician and Member of Parliament.

== Early life ==
Raheem was born on 9 August 1921. He was educated at St. Xavier's Boys' College, Jaffna Central College and Jaffna College.

== Career ==
Raheem entered local politics in 1960, serving as chairman of Mannar Town Council between 1962 and 1972.

Raheem contested the 1970 parliamentary election as the United National Party's candidate in Mannar but was defeated by the incumbent V. A. Alegacone of the Illankai Tamil Arasu Kachchi. Alegacone died on 25 November 1973, Raheem contested the ensuing by-election on 25 February 1974 and was elected to Parliament in a close contest, gaining 12,974 votes against 12,899 by S.M. Johan Mark.

== Later life ==
Raheem was appointed Sri Lanka's High Commissioner to Kenya in 1978. He was also Sri Lanka's representative at the Habitat International Coalition, founder member of the Moors’ Islamic Cultural Home, vice president of the All Ceylon Muslim League, vice chairman Paddy Marketing Board and director of the Sri Lanka Cashew Corporation. He died in 1989.
