= Rohan Jayasekera =

Rohan Jayasekera may refer to:

- Rohan Jayasekera (cricketer), former cricketer who represented Sri Lanka and Canada
- Rohan Jayasekera (writer), Associate Editor of Index on Censorship
