= William Brindley =

English police officer

Personal information
- Full name: William Thomas Brindley
- Born: 4 December 1896; High Wycombe, Buckinghamshire, England
- Died: 13 August 1958 (aged 61); Virginia Water, Surrey, England
- Batting: Right-handed
- Bowling: Unknown

Domestic team information
- Years: Team
- 1930–1935: Minor Counties
- 1926/1927: Europeans (Ceylon)
- 1925–1935: Buckinghamshire

Career statistics
Competition	First-class
Matches	9
Runs scored	221
Batting average	17.00
100s/50s	–/1
Top score	59*
Balls bowled	835
Wickets	14
Bowling average	27.78
5 wickets in innings	1
10 wickets in match	–
Best bowling	5/40
Catches/stumpings	4/–
- Source: Cricinfo, 2 September 2011

Captain William Thomas Brindley OBE, OStJ, KPFSM (4 December 1896 – 13 August 1958) was an English police officer. Brindley was also a cricketer, who played as a right-handed batsman, although his bowling style is not known. He was born in High Wycombe, Buckinghamshire and attended High Wycombe Royal Grammar School from 1910 to 1915. He would later become a senior colonial police officer in Ceylon.

Brindley served in World War I, entering service as a 2nd Lieutenant in the reserve of the Oxfordshire and Buckinghamshire Light Infantry. By November 1917 he held the rank of Lieutenant and was still serving in the Oxfordshire and Buckinghamshire Light Infantry, in that same month he was promoted to Acting Captain. Following the war, Brindley reverted to a Lieutenant on 25 June 1919. He left the British Army on 1 April 1920, upon resigning his commission he was granted the rank of captain.

At some point following the war he joined the Ceylon Police Force. In the 1920s Brindley began playing representative cricket. In England, he made his debut for Buckinghamshire in the 1925 Minor Counties Championship against the Kent Second XI. In British Ceylon he made his first-class debut for Dr J Rockwood's Ceylon XI against WE Lucas' Bombay XI in February 1926. A year later he made another two first-class appearances, one for the Europeans (Ceylon) against the touring Marylebone Cricket Club, and another for Ceylon against the same opposition. He returned to England in 1930, playing Minor counties cricket for Buckinghamshire, as well as making a first-class appearance for the Minor Counties against Lancashire. He also appeared for Club Cricket Conference against the Australians (Lords, 6–8 September), taking five for 71, including Kippax and McCabe in one over. His next first-class appearance came for Ceylon against the touring Marylebone Cricket Club in February 1934. In that same month he appeared for a combined India and Ceylon XI against the same opposition. In 1935, he once again returned to England, where he made eight further Minor Counties Championship appearances for Buckinghamshire, as well as making two further first-class appearances for the Minor Counties, against Cambridge University and Oxford University. These matches marked his final first-class appearances, in total he made nine appearances, scoring 221 runs at an average of 17.00, with a high score of 59 not out. With the ball, he took 14 wickets at a bowling average of 27.78, with best figures of 5/40.

He was present at the coronation of King George VI and Queen Elizabeth at Westminster Abbey in December 1936. In January 1938, Brindley was admitted to the Venerable Order of Saint John as an officer. In 1947, he was made a member of the Most Excellent Order of the British Empire. By this stage in his policing career, he was the Deputy Inspector General of Police in Ceylon. He continued this role into 1951, a year in which he was awarded the King's Police and Fire Services Medal by King George VI in the 1951 Birthday Honours. In Ceylon, he led the Police side to several Government Services Cricket Championships. He died in Virginia Water, Surrey on 13 August 1958.
