= Kanthiah Vaithianathan =

Sri Lankan politician (1896–1965)

Senator Sir Kanthiah Vaithianathan CBE

Minister of Housing and Social Services
- In office 1952–1956

Permanent Secretary, Ministry of External Affairs and Defence
- In office 1947–1952

Personal details
- Born: 1896
- Died: 1965 (aged 68–69)

Sir Kanthiah Vaithianathan or Vaidyanathan CBE (1896–1965) was a Ceylonese civil servant, politician, Member of the Senate and Minister of Housing and Social Services.

== Civil service career ==
Having graduated with a BSc from the University of London, he joined the Ceylon Civil Service and served as a cadet in the Ratnapura Kachcheri in 1925. He went on to serve as the Information Officer of the Ceylon Government during World War 2 in the early 1940s and from 1943 he was served as the Commissioner for Food (Supplies) of the Department of Ceylon Government Supplies in New Delhi, India. In 1947, he became the first Permanent Secretary to the Ministry of External Affairs and Defence of independent Ceylon.

== Political career ==
In 1952, Vaithianathan resigned from the post of Permanent Secretary, to be appointed by the Governor General to the Senate of Ceylon and appointed Minister of Housing and Social Services in the cabinet of the newly appointed Prime Minister Sir John Kotelawala. In 1953, he was also given the Industries portfolio following the resignation of G. G. Ponnambalam, Minister of Industries and Fisheries.

Vaithianathan contested the Mannar constituency in the 1956 general election as an Independent, and lost to Federal Party candidate V. A. Alegacone, by polling only 4,857 votes to Alegacone's 6,726 and C. Sittampalam's 1,078.

== Social service ==
He was the president of the Rotary Club of Colombo, patron of the Colombo Tamil Sangam and one of the founders of the Hindu Educational Society which established the Colombo Hindu College. He was elected vice president of the Royal Asiatic Society (Ceylon) Branch in 1952.

== Honors ==
Vaithianathan, was appointed a Commander of the Order of the British Empire (CBE) in the 1949 New Year Honours and knighted as a Knight Bachelor in the 1950 Birthday Honours.

== Family ==
He was married to Lady Vaithianathan. His son Mahen Vaithianathan was one of the first diplomats of the Ceylon Overseas Service. He lived at "Senthil", Charles Place, Colombo 3.
