= Cathiravelu Ponnambalam =

Sri Lankan politician

Cathiravelu Ponnambalam (Cathiravelu Ponnambalam) was the 2nd Mayor of Jaffna.

== Biography ==
Ponnambalam hailed from a distinguished Tamil family from Jaffna. His father Arumugam Cathiravelu was a Magistrate and District Judge. His own brother Cathiravelu Sittampalam was the first Cabinet Minister of Posts and Telecommunications in the independent Sri Lanka. His uncle Arumugam Canagaratnam was the chairman of the first Urban Council of Jaffna and built and founded Canagaratnam Maha Vidyalayam. Ponnambalam's grand uncle Viswanather Casipillai was a Crown Proctor and co-founder of the Jaffna Hindu College.

== See also ==
- List of political families in Sri Lanka
