= Ridgeway Thilakeratne =

Sri Lankan civil servant and broadcaster

Ridgeway Tillakaratne
- Born: 14 August 1931; Sri Lanka
- Died: 19 August 1981 (aged 50)
- Education: Nalanda College Colombo
- Occupations: Broadcaster & Civil Servant
- Employer: Ceylon Broadcasting Corporation

Ridgeway Tillakaratne was civil servant of repute & a broadcaster in Sri Lanka. He was chairman and Director-general of the then Ceylon Broadcasting Corporation

== Early life and education ==
Ridgeway was educated at Nalanda College, Colombo. Two of his famous classmates at Nalanda were Chitrananda Abeysekera and Karunaratne Abeysekera and contemporaries being Henry Jayasena, Stanley Jayasinghe and Gunadasa Amarasekara .

== Career ==
Ridgeway Thilakeratne also has held posts of being Government Agent of Pollonnaruwa, Hambanthota, Ratnapura Districts and Permanent Secretary to Ministry of Information and Broadcasting

== See also ==
- Sri Lanka Broadcasting Corporation
