= Mannar Electoral District =

Former electoral district of Sri Lanka

Mannar Electoral District was an electoral district of Sri Lanka between August 1947 and February 1989. The district was named after the town of Mannar in Mannar District, Northern Province. The 1978 Constitution of Sri Lanka introduced the proportional representation electoral system for electing members of Parliament. The existing 160 mainly single-member electoral districts were replaced with 22 multi-member electoral districts. Mannar electoral district was replaced by the Vanni multi-member electoral district at the 1989 general elections, the first under the PR system, though Mannar continues to be a polling division of the multi-member electoral district.

== Members of Parliament ==
Key

Independent ITAK UNP TULF

Election	Member	Party	Term
1947	C. Sittampalam	Independent	1947-1952
1952	C. Sittampalam	Independent	1952-1956
1956	V. A. Alegacone	Illankai Tamil Arasu Kachchi	1956-1960
1960 (March)	V. A. Alegacone	Illankai Tamil Arasu Kachchi	1960-1960
1960 (July)	V. A. Alegacone	Illankai Tamil Arasu Kachchi	1960-1965
1965	V. A. Alegacone	Illankai Tamil Arasu Kachchi	1965-1970
1970	V. A. Alegacone	Illankai Tamil Arasu Kachchi	1970-1977
1974	S. A. Raheem	United National Party	1970-1977
1977	P. S. Soosaithasan	Tamil United Liberation Front	1977-1989

== Elections ==
=== 1947 Parliamentary General Election ===
Results of the 1st parliamentary election held between 23 August 1947 and 20 September 1947:

Candidate	Party	Symbol	Votes	%
C. Sittampalam	Independent	Key	5,877	59.97%
J. Tyagaraja	United National Party	Umbrella	3,381	34.50%
S. Viraspillai	Independent	Hand	542	5.53%
Valid Votes			9,800	100.00%
Rejected Votes			71	
Total Polled			9,871	
Registered Electors			14,587	
Turnout			67.67%	

=== 1952 Parliamentary General Election ===
Results of the 2nd parliamentary election held between 24 May 1952 and 30 May 1952:

Candidate	Party	Symbol	Votes	%
C. Sittampalam	Independent	Key	5,876	52.62%
V. A. Alegacone	Independent	Star	5,290	47.38%
Valid Votes			11,166	100.00%
Rejected Votes			113	
Total Polled			11,279	
Registered Electors			14,959	
Turnout			75.40%	

=== 1956 Parliamentary General Election ===
Results of the 3rd parliamentary election held between 5 April 1956 and 10 April 1956:

Candidate	Party	Symbol	Votes	%
V. A. Alegacone	Illankai Tamil Arasu Kachchi	House	6,726	53.12%
Sir Kanthiah Vaithianathan		Umbrella	4,857	38.36%
C. Sittampalam	Independent	Bicycle	1,078	8.51%
Valid Votes			12,661	100.00%
Rejected Votes			105	
Total Polled			12,766	
Registered Electors			15,819	
Turnout			80.70%	

=== 1960 (March) Parliamentary General Election ===
Results of the 4th parliamentary election held on 19 March 1960:

Candidate	Party	Symbol	Votes	%
V. A. Alegacone	Illankai Tamil Arasu Kachchi	House	6,463	47.37%
S. H. Mohamed	Independent	Pot	4,587	33.62%
Sabamalai John Mark		Cockerel	2,155	15.79%
N. M. Abdul Caffoor		Pair of Spectacles	440	3.22%
Valid Votes			13,645	100.00%
Rejected Votes			126	
Total Polled			13,771	
Registered Electors			16,936	
Turnout			81.31%	

=== 1960 (July) Parliamentary General Election ===
Results of the 5th parliamentary election held on 20 July 1960:

Candidate	Party	Symbol	Votes	%
V. A. Alegacone	Illankai Tamil Arasu Kachchi	House	7,307	55.79%
S. H. Mohamed	United National Party	Elephant	5,790	44.21%
Valid Votes			13,097	100.00%
Rejected Votes			72	
Total Polled			13,169	
Registered Electors			16,936	
Turnout			77.76%	

=== 1965 Parliamentary General Election ===
Results of the 6th parliamentary election held on 22 March 1965:

Candidate	Party	Symbol	Votes	%
V. A. Alegacone	Illankai Tamil Arasu Kachchi	House	6,896	39.52%
M. S. Abdul Raheem	Independent	Umbrella	6,040	34.61%
Sabamalai John Mark		Pair of Spectacles	4,514	25.87%
Valid Votes			17,450	100.00%
Rejected Votes			121	
Total Polled			17,571	
Registered Electors			21,418	
Turnout			82.04%	

=== 1970 Parliamentary General Election ===
Results of the 7th parliamentary election held on 27 May 1970:

Candidate	Party	Symbol	Votes	%
V. A. Alegacone	Illankai Tamil Arasu Kachchi	House	10,697	48.98%
S. A. Raheem	United National Party	Elephant	10,628	48.67%
N. M. Abdul Cader	Sri Lanka Freedom Party	Hand	513	2.35%
Valid Votes			21,838	100.00%
Rejected Votes			127	
Total Polled			21,965	
Registered Electors			25,441	
Turnout			86.34%	

V. A. Alegacone died on 25 November 1973.

==== 1974 Parliamentary by-Election ====
Results of the parliamentary by-election held on 25 February 1974:

Candidate	Party	Symbol	Votes	%
S. A. Raheem	United National Party	Elephant	12,974	49.05%
S. M. Johan Mark	Illankai Tamil Arasu Kachchi	House	12,899	48.77%
S. A. Cader	Independent	Sun	469	1.77%
S. Percy Emmanuel		lamp	108	0.41%
Valid Votes		26,450	100%	
Rejected Votes		130		
Total Polled		26,580		
Registered Electors		29,596		
Turnout		89.81%		

=== 1977 Parliamentary General Election ===
Results of the 8th parliamentary election held on 21 July 1977:

Candidate	Party	Symbol	Votes	%
P. S. Soosaithasan	Tamil United Liberation Front	Sun	15,141	51.58%
M. S. Abdul Raheem	United National Party	Elephant	12,929	44.05%
Sabamalai John Mark	Independent	Lamp	663	2.26%
H. S. Dawood		Hand	478	1.63%
M. Kanthasamy		Pair of Scales	141	0.48%
Valid Votes			29,352	100.00%
Rejected Votes			84	
Total Polled			29,436	
Registered Electors			31,767	
Turnout			92.66%	

P. S. Soosaithasan and all other TULF MPs boycotted Parliament from the middle of 1983 for a number of reasons: they were under pressure from Sri Lankan Tamil militants not to stay in Parliament beyond their normal six-year term; the Sixth Amendment to the Constitution of Sri Lanka required them to swear an oath unconditionally renouncing support for a separate state; and the Black July riots in which up to 3,000 Tamils were murdered by Sinhalese mobs. After three months of absence, Soosaithasan forfeited his seat in Parliament on 22 October 1983.
