= V. A. Alegacone =

Ceylon Tamil lawyer, politician and Member of Parliament

Hon. V. A. Alegacone MP
- வி. ஏ. அழகக்கோன்

Member of the Ceylonese Parliament for Mannar
- In office 1956–1973
- Preceded by: C. Sittampalam
- Succeeded by: S. A. Raheem

Chairman, Mannar Town Council
- In office 1947–1956

Personal details
- Born: 19 March 1903
- Died: 25 November 1973 (aged 70)
- Party: Illankai Tamil Arasu Kachchi
- Education: St. Xavier's Boys' College
- Profession: Lawyer
- Ethnicity: Ceylon Tamil

Virasipillai Albert Alegacone (Tamil: விராசிப்பிள்ளை அல்பர்ட் அழகக்கோன்; 19 March 1903 – 25 November 1973) was a Ceylon Tamil lawyer, politician and Member of Parliament.

== Early life ==
Alegacone was born on 19 March 1903. He was the son of Bastiampillai Virasipillai Sinniah and Annamah. He was from one of the leading families in Mannar in northern Ceylon. He was educated at St. Xavier's Boys' College, Mannar. He joined the legal profession, becoming a proctor and a notary public, and practising law in Mannar. He was president of Mannar and Jaffna Diocesan Council for a number of years.

Alegacone married Mary Sebastiammah, daughter of Bastiampillai Arasaratnam. They had five children - Arunthathie, Thevathasan, Balendra, Sathiyavan and Arichandran.

== Political career ==
Alegacone was elected to Mannar Town Council in the 1940s. He served as the council's chairman between 1947 and 1956.

Alegacone stood as an independent candidate in Mannar at the 1952 parliamentary election but was defeated by the sitting MP C. Sittampalam. He later joined the Illankai Tamil Arasu Kachchi (Federal Party) and became an active member of the party. He won the 1956 parliamentary election in Mannar as an ITAK's candidate and entered Parliament. He was re-elected at the March 1960, July 1960, 1965 and 1970 parliamentary elections.

Alegacone died on 25 November 1973.
