= St. Xavier's Girls' College =

Location
- Mannar, Mannar District, Northern Province; Sri Lanka
- Coordinates: 8°58′54.10″N 79°54′29.20″E

Information
- School type: Public national 1AB
- School district: Mannar Education Zone
- Authority: Ministry of Education
- School number: 1201003
- Teaching staff: 75
- Grades: 1-13
- Gender: Girls
- Age range: 5-18

St. Xavier's Girls' College is a national school in Mannar, Sri Lanka.

== See also ==
- List of schools in Northern Province, Sri Lanka
- St. Xavier's Boys' College
- List of Jesuit sites
