= Walter Philps =

Ceylonese-born English cricketer

Personal information
- Full name: Walter Robert Norman Philps
- Born: 8 April 1903; Ceylon
- Batting: Unknown

Domestic team information
- Years: Team
- 1920: Hertfordshire
- 1922–1927: Buckinghamshire
- 1926/27: Europeans (Ceylon)

Career statistics
Competition	First-class
Matches	1
Runs scored	24
Batting average	12.00
100s/50s	–/–
Top score	13
Catches/stumpings	–/–
- Source: Cricinfo, 26 May 2011

Walter Robert Norman Philps (8 April 1903 – date of death unknown) was a Ceylonese born English cricketer. Philps batting and bowling styles are unknown. He was educated at Brighton College in England, where he represented the college cricket team.

Philps made his debut in county cricket for Hertfordshire in the 1920 Minor Counties Championship against Buckinghamshire. This was his only appearance for the county. He later joined Buckinghamshire, who he played Minor counties cricket for from 1922 to 1927.

He made his only first-class appearance for the Europeans (Ceylon) against the Marylebone Cricket Club in January 1927. In the Europeans first-innings, he scored 13 runs before being dismissed by Ewart Astill. In their second-innings, he scored 11 runs before being dismissed by Peter Eckersley.
