= Prisoner No.1056 =

2023 memoir by Roy Ratnavel

Prisoner #1056
- Hardcover edition
- Author: Roy Ratnavel
- Language: English
- Subject: Autobiography
- Genre: Non-fiction
- Publisher: Viking Canada
- Publication date: April 18, 2023
- Publication place: Canada
- Media type: Print, e-book, audiobook
- Pages: 272 pp.
- ISBN: 978-0-7352-4572-3

Prisoner #1056: How I Survived War and Found Peace is a memoir by Roy Ratnavel, a Sri Lankan Tamil Canadian war victim and business executive.

Prisoner #1056 narrates Ratnavel’s immigrant story, fleeing from torture and imprisonment, arriving in Canada with $50 in his pocket, and then rising from the mailroom to the executive suite.

== Recognition ==
- CBC Books listed on June 20, 2023, 'Prisoner #1056' as one of the '15 Canadian books to read for World Refugee Day'; The United Nations has created this day in its bid to raise awareness how the refugees around the world are undergoing inhumanity and severe hardships.
- #1 National Bestseller – The memoir reached #1 on Canada’s national non‑fiction bestseller list for the week of May 5, 2023, as reported by The Globe and Mail (via a pay‑walled list) and confirmed by the author’s announcement on social media.
- 2024 Axiom Business Book Award – Bronze Medal (Memoir / Biography) – Prisoner # 1056 was awarded the Bronze Medal in category 24 (Memoir / Biography) at the 2024 Axiom Business Book Awards.
- Audible Canada – Best of 2023 Audiobooks – The audiobook version was selected among Audible Canada’s “Best of 2023” audiobook titles, listing Prisoner # 1056 among its notable picks.
