= P. S. Soosaithasan =

Sri Lankan Tamil politician (1934–2017)

Hon. P. S. Soosaithasan MP
- பி. எஸ். சூசைதாசன்

Member of Parliament for Mannar
- In office 1977–1983
- Preceded by: S. A. Raheem

Personal details
- Born: 24 July 1934
- Died: 13 October 2017 (aged 83)
- Party: Tamil National Alliance
- Profession: Accountant
- Ethnicity: Sri Lankan Tamil
- Religion: Catholic

Pilesiyan Sosai Soosaithasan (Tamil: பிலேசியன் சூசை சூசைதாசன், romanized: Pilēciyaṉ Cūcai Cūcaitācaṉ; 24 July 1934 – 13 October 2017) was a Sri Lankan Tamil accountant, politician and Member of Parliament.

== Early life ==
Soosaithasan was born on 24 July 1934. He was from Vankalai in northern Ceylon and was a Catholic.

== Career ==
Soosaithasan was an accountant and worked in Ceylon, United Kingdom, Zambia and Canada. He was chief accountant at Lanka Salu Sala, the state owned hand loom and textile manufacturer.

Soosaithasan stood as the Tamil United Liberation Front's candidate in Mannar at the 1977 parliamentary election. He won the election and entered Parliament. He served as chairman of the Public Accounts Committee. Soosaithasan and all other TULF MPs boycotted Parliament from the middle of 1983 for a number of reasons: they were under pressure from Sri Lankan Tamil militants not to stay in Parliament beyond their normal six-year term; the Sixth Amendment to the Constitution of Sri Lanka required them to swear an oath unconditionally renouncing support for a separate state; and the Black July riots in which up to 3,000 Tamils were killed by Sinhalese mobs. After three months of absence, Soosaithasan forfeited his seat in Parliament on 22 October 1983.

Later Soosaithasan migrated to Canada where some of his children were living, taking up Canadian citizenship and working as an accountant in the private and public sector. After retirement Soosaithasan returned to Sri Lanka to live in Vankalai, taking up dual citizenship.

Soosaithasan was one of the Tamil National Alliance (TNA) candidates in Vanni District at the 2010 parliamentary election but failed to get elected after coming sixth amongst the TNA candidates.

Soosaithasan died on 13 October 2017 in Sri Lanka.

== Electoral history ==
Electoral history of P. S. Soosaithasan
Election	Constituency	Party	Votes	Result
1977 parliamentary	Mannar	TULF	15,141	Elected
2010 parliamentary	Vanni District	TNA	7,156	Not elected
