= Sabapathypillai Illangaratnam =

Sri Lankan cricketer (1947–2007)

Personal information
- Born: 18 December 1947; Jaffna, Ceylon
- Died: 16 July 2007; Colombo, Sri Lanka
- Batting: Right-handed
- Bowling: Right-arm medium-fast

Domestic team information
- Years: Team
- 1977: Sri Lanka

Umpiring information
- LA umpired: 1 (2002)

Career statistics
Competition	List A
Matches	1
Runs scored	–
Batting average	–
100s/50s	–
Top score	–
Balls bowled	32
Wickets	0
Bowling average	–
5 wickets in innings	–
10 wickets in match	–
Best bowling	–
Catches/stumpings	0/–
- Source: CricInfo, 8 February 2019

Sabapathypillai Illangaratnam (18 December 1947 – 16 July 2007) was a Sri Lankan cricketer who played in the era prior to Sri Lanka gaining Test status.

== Early life ==
Born in Irupalai in Jaffna, Illangaratnam attended Colombo Hindu College in Ratmalana and gained employment at the Bank of Ceylon, initially as a junior clerk at the bank's city office, the largest Ceylon Bank branch at the time.

== Playing career ==
Illangaratnam first played A division cricket for Bank of Ceylon in tournaments conducted by the Nationalised Services’ Cricket Association. Illange, as he was affectionately called, was picked for the Moratuwa Sports Club team to play in the premiere Sri Lankan cricket tournament, the P Saravanamuttu Trophy, opening the bowling with Sylvester Dias.

Illangaratnam later joined the Bloomfield Cricket and Athletic Club in Colombo. He opened the bowling with Susantha Karunarathne and provided him with the opportunity to play along with future Test players such as Bandula Warnapura, Lalith Kaluperuma, Anura Ranasinghe and Ajit de Silva. During his playing period, Illangaratnam had to compete with quality fast bowlers such as Ranjan Goonathilake, Susantha Karunarathne, D.L.S. De Silva and Tony Opatha.

Illangaratnam's sole List A match was in 1977, representing Sri Lanka against the visiting Marylebone Cricket Club (MCC) team at the Sinhalese Sports Club Ground, bowling four wicketless overs and not batting.

Following his retirement from competitive cricket, Illangaratnam captained Bloomfield's Division II team, winning the Division II competition In 1993–94. He also played for veterans' club Lanka Cavalier, led by Warnapura.

== Coaching and administration ==
Following the end of his playing career, Illangaratnam was made Bloomfield's Division II coach and later appointed coach for the Premier Division side, a position he held until his death. He was a member of the executive committee of the club and acted as a match referee.

Illangaratnam was involved with a team of cricket coaches from the Cricket Operations Department of the Board of Cricket Control for Sri Lanka (BCCSL), headed by Bandula Warnapura, Anusha Samaranayake, Gamini Perera, P. Milton, Manjula Karunaratne and S. Shamugalingam in conducting a five-day cricket coaching programme from the 12 to 16 November 2002 up north of the country for the first time following the conclusion of the Sri Lankan Civil War. Illangaratnam contributed to this noble cause by travelling to remote areas to conduct coaching camps with the cavaliers.

In 2002, Illangaratnam served as a referee and umpire in Sri Lankan domestic cricket. He was an umpire in one List A match between the Tamil Union Cricket and Athletic Club and the Sri Lanka Air Force Sports Club.

He held the position of Assistant Secretary of Bloomfield.

== Death and legacy ==
Illangaratnam died aged 59, still working at the Bank of Ceylon, counting over 45 years of service at the time of his death. He was survived by his wife and two daughters.

In his memory, the S. Illangaratnam Memorial Challenge Trophy was played between Lanka Cavaliers and the Bank of Ceylon Veterans.
