= Alagu Subramaniam =

British Author (1910–1971)

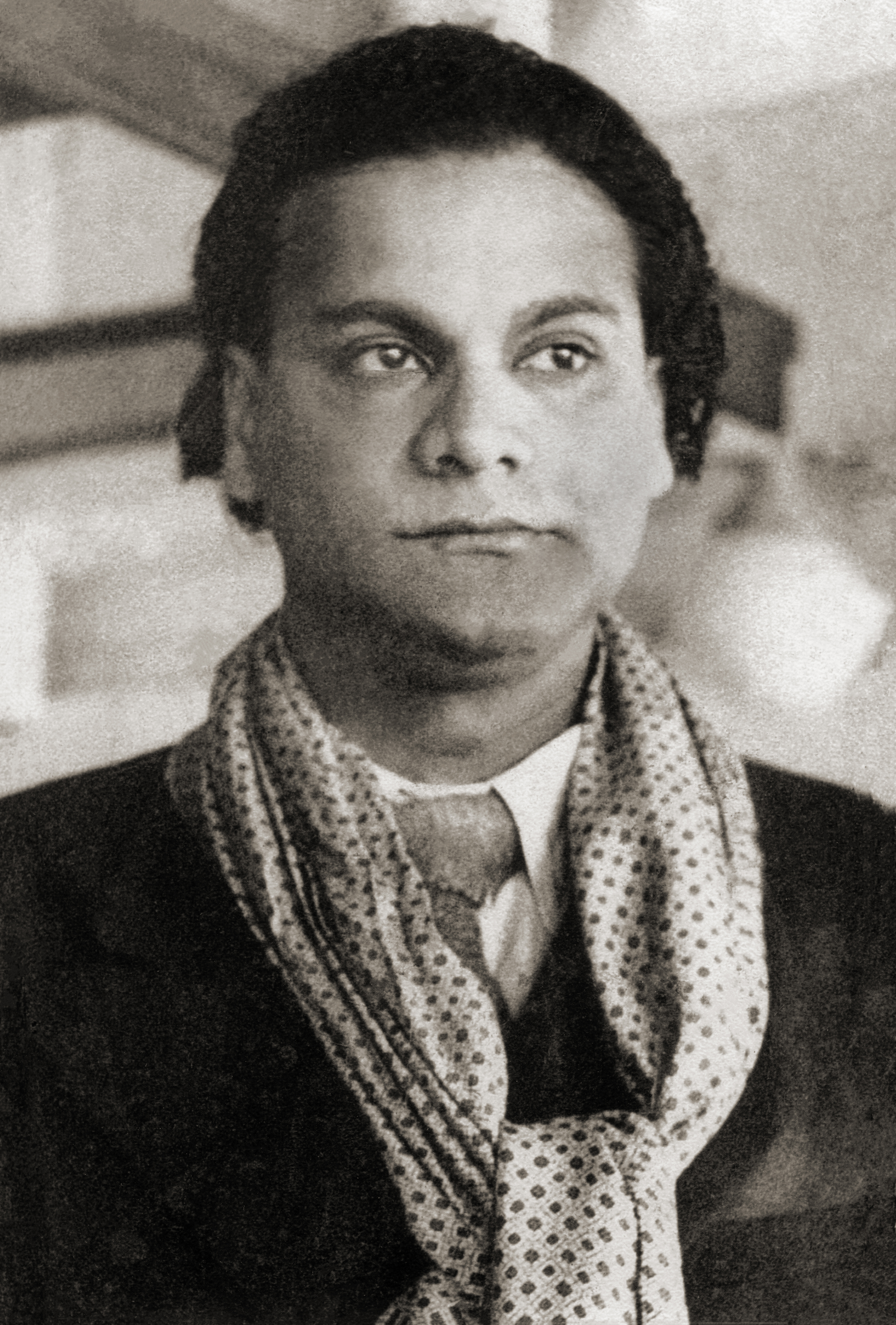
- Born: 1910; Jaffna, British Ceylon
- Died: 1971 (aged 60–61); Jaffna
- Occupations: Writer, Barrister
- Known for: Author of The Big Girl & Other Stories

Alagu Subramaniam (1910–1971) was a British Ceylon born writer, a prominent figure in London's Bloomsbury literary circle, a Barrister-at-Law of The Honourable Society of Lincoln's Inn, and an Advocate of the Supreme Court of Ceylon.

He is the author of The Big Girl & Other Stories a retro-collection of short stories; they recount scenes of life in Jaffna during the colonial era, which includes the short story "Professional Mourners" which reflects the obsolete customs and practices of professional mourning done by some Sri Lankan Tamil communities.

He also authored the book Closing Time & Other Stories which contains stories set in London during the World War 2 era.

Mulk Raj Anand and Iqbal Singh published one of his short stories in their anthology Indian Short Stories (New India Publishing Company, 1946). His short stories were published by a number of journals, such as Life, Letters Today, Left Review and Tribune.

He was involved with the anti-colonial organisation, Swaraj House, which was formed in 1942 as a break-away group from the British Committee of the Indian National Congress.

He was one of the founders and editors of the literary magazine Indian Writing of which Rabindranath Tagore and Jawaharlal Nehru also contributed.

He was one of the founding fathers of Hindu Educational Society which had established several schools, including the Colombo Hindu College.

== Early life ==
Alagu Subramaniam belonged to the Sri Lankan Tamil ethnic group. His father was a judge in Ceylon and his grandfather was a literary personage.

He had his early schooling at Jaffna Central College.

== Commentary by notable people ==
"Mr. Subramaniayam could have had a sound practice at the English Bar, but he preferred to pursue his literary work, which is of a higher order"

- Lester Hutchinson, D es L., Former MP (British House of Commons)

"Stories told sardonically and succinctly"

- Philip Day, Sunday Times (London)

"Among the Sri Lankan writers who belonged to the English-speaking elite of the early post-independence era, the London-based barrister Alagu Subramaniam used to be prominent. At a time we are heading for the third decade of the 21st Century, when most of what used to be commonplace has become history, it was a great pleasure to have a copy of the new impression of the 1964 imprint of The Big Girl & Other Stories by Subramaniam whose "Professional Mourners", I consider one of the best Sri Lankan short stories written in English for the sincerity and localness he maintains throughout his narration. My paper on it uploaded to the www.academia.edu in early 2018 under the topic "Servile Mourning for the Powerful: A Critical Reading of ‘Professional Mourners’ by Alagu Subramaniam" has attracted nearly 4000 views from an international readership spread across the world. I have received many commendations for uploading it as the humour it carries is both innocent, and caustic at the same time."

- E. A. Gamini Fonseka BA (Kelaniya), MA (Edinburgh), PhD (Vaasa), Senior Professor in English, Department of English

== Personal life ==
Subramaniam was married to a graduate teacher.

== The Big Girl & Other Stories ==
The Big Girl & Other Stories
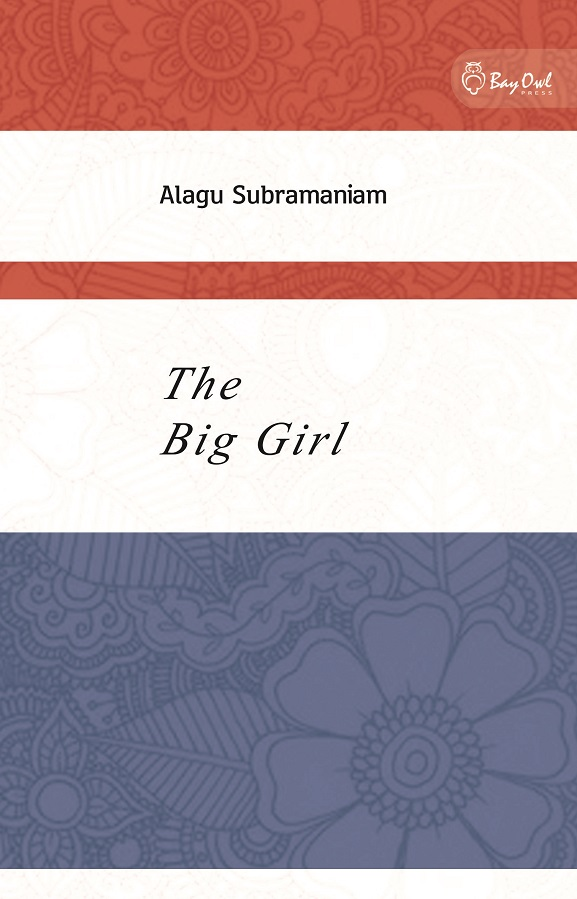
- Author: Alagu Subramaniam
- Language: English
- Genre: Short Stories
- Publisher: Bay Owl Press(Sri Lanka)
- Publication date: 2018(originally published in 1964)
- Publication place: Sri Lanka
- Media type: Reprint
- ISBN: 978-955-1723-41-5

The Big Girl & Other Stories is a retro-collection of short stories by Subramaniam.

The stories recount scenes of life in Jaffna during the colonial era.

The Big Girl contains 17 episodes (including “Professional Mourners”) of humour, surprise, pathos and rare insight into the daily lives of people, with all the historical, religious, cultural and psychological diversity and complexity. The book, which had disappeared from circulation, has now been updated and reprinted in its entirety.

=== Background ===
When this book was first published in 1964, Ceylon had been independent of the British for about 16 years. Then as now, the effect of colonialism was a topic of open discussion. English writers of the past have often written from the perspective of coloniser rather than colonised. However, Ceylonese born Subramaniam writes from a Sri Lankan viewpoint.

=== Solomon’s Justice ===
In “Solomon’s Justice”, the collision of traditions is emphasised by the coroner - who wears both white, ‘the appropriate colour for an Asian funeral’ and black, a ‘necktie, the symbol of European mourning’. The magistrate, presiding over a dispute about who is wife and who ex-wife to their deceased husband and thus entitled to make funeral arrangements, insists that the disputants keep ‘the Queen’s peace’.

But the appropriateness of keeping to standards of European decorum in a Sri Lankan context is immediately questioned – ‘”The Queen’s peace in Buckingham Palace?’” The dispute’s ‘resolution’ is eventually provided by a Mother Superior. Her suggestion: severing the corpse in half, thus solving the problem over the funeral, a ceremony intended as a mark of reverence, love and respect for the deceased.

=== The Thorn ===
“The Thorn” shows the emotional effects on a very young girl (learning English reduces her to tears), and demonstrates the casual emotional blackmail involved (your Mother won't go to heaven). These effects embed themselves into even the simplest daily act – eating a meal – causing frustration and distress through the inability to eat ‘properly’ with a ‘thorn’ (fork), rather than her fingers.

=== The Scholar ===
Several stories examine the conflict between a modernising younger generation and an older tradition. In “The Scholar” Thambirajah is introduced as successful in the new, modern way (having received a scholarship to study in England for three years). Such success ironically makes him an attractive prospect for a traditional arranged marriage, which his parents duly organise for him.

The story turns on this conflict between tradition and modernity, older and younger generations (Tharimbirajah has met another student, Radha, and both want to marry). However, in the end the force of tradition wins out (and here force means exactly that, physical force – Radha is beaten into submission).

=== Professional Mourners ===
In “Professional Mourners”, a funeral in a village is depicted where a self-important organiser of the funeral behaving inhumanly with low caste professional mourners despite their own mother's death on that morning.

The lower caste women, gets unexpected sympathy at the funeral, and the organiser of the funeral put himself in an awkward position.

== Closing Time & Other Stories ==
Closing Time & Other Stories
- Author: Alagu Subramaniam
- Language: English
- Genre: Short Stories
- Publisher: Ohm Books Publishing(United Kingdom)
- Publication date: 2021(originally published in 1971)
- Publication place: United Kingdom
- Media type: Reprint
- ISBN: 979-853-1049-59-9

Closing Time & Other Stories is a collection of short stories set in London and depicts the life of a foreign student in the Second World War era London.

=== Single Room ===
"Single Room" is about a new student in London, looking for a room for himself.

=== The Kid ===
"The Kid" features a law student who is also a writer.

=== Liabilities ===
"Liabilities" is about a barrister who also works as a manager of a bookshop.

=== Closing Time ===
"Closing Time" is about a number of writers and poets who move from one pub to another after each one closes.

== Bibliography ==
- Subramaniam, Alagu (1964), The Big Girl and Other Stories, Universal Printers(Sri Lanka)(Original from The University of Michigan; Digitized 5 Mar 2007), ISBN 955-1723-41-4
- Subramaniam, Alagu (2018), The Big Girl and Other Stories, Bay Owl Press(Sri Lanka)(Reprint), ISBN 978-955-1723-41-5
- Subramaniam, Alagu (2021), Closing Time, Ohm Books Publishing(United Kingdom)(Reprint), ISBN 979-853-1049-59-9
