= Roy Ratnavel =

Sri Lankan-Canadian executive

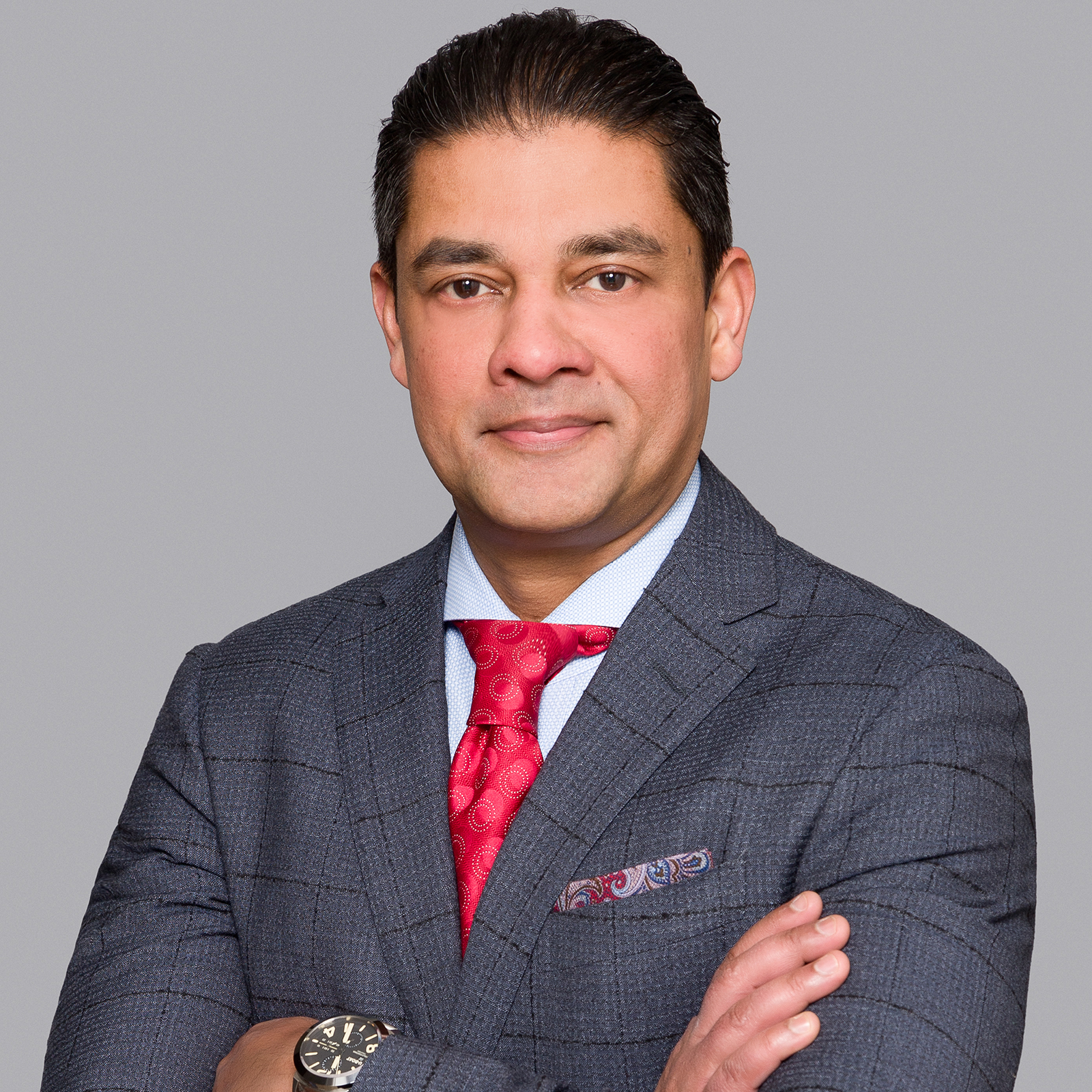
- Ratnavel in 2020
- Born: 1969 (age 56–57); Colombo, Sri Lanka
- Education: University of Toronto
- Website: www.royratnavel.com

Roy Ratnavel is a Sri Lankan-born Tamil Canadian business executive and the author of the book Prisoner #1056.

He was a Vice Chairman and served as the Head of Distribution and Executive Vice-President at the CI Financial.

== Early life ==
Ratnavel was born in 1969 in Colombo, Sri Lanka and brought up in Point Pedro, a small town in the northern part of Jaffna Peninsula during the Sri Lankan Civil War.

He was arrested by the Sri Lankan Army during Operation Liberation just for being a Tamil on suspicion and became a political prisoner at the age of 17 and underwent severe hardships at the prison in brutal and oppressive ways. After his miraculous release from prison, he reached Canada at the age of 18 with just $50 in his pocket.

Two days after arriving, his father was shot and killed by the Indian Army, during their mission in Sri Lanka. He had to start life in the new country in a highly traumatised condition, alone.

== Education ==
Ratnavel's secondary education was at Hartley College. Ratnavel completed his high school while working. He earned his bachelor's degree from the University of Toronto.

== Career ==
Ratnavel started his career with an entry-level job in CI Financial’s mailroom and subsequently rose to senior leadership positions as an executive vice president and later as a vice chairman and then retired after serving more than 30 years at CI Financial.

== Awards and recognition ==
Best Executive Awards by The Globe and Mail

In 2020, Ratnavel is one of the award recipients among 50 Canadian Best Executives; they led their companies through COVID-19 and built a better country in the process. The recipients were vetted by The Globe and Mail editors.

Tamil American Pioneer Award by Federation of Tamil Sangams of North America (FeTNA)

In 2025, Ratnavel received the Tamil American Pioneer (TAP) Award from the Federation of Tamil Sangams of North America (FeTNA) in the category of Business and Entrepreneurship. The award honors distinguished Tamil professionals in North America who have made pioneering contributions in their respective fields. Ratnavel was recognized for his leadership as Vice Chairman of CI Financial, his bestselling memoir Prisoner #1056, and his advocacy for mental health awareness.

Top 25 Canadian Immigrant Award by Canadian Immigrant

In 2026, Ratnavel was named one of the recipients of the Top 25 Canadian Immigrant Awards, an annual recognition presented by Canadian Immigrant celebrating immigrants who have made significant contributions to Canada.

== Bibliography ==
Ratnavel’s Prisoner #1056 narrates his immigrant story, fleeing from torture and imprisonment, arriving in Canada with $50 in his pocket, and then rising from the mailroom to the executive suite.

Brian Mulroney, former Prime Minister of Canada noted on Prisoner #1056;

“Millions of people fleeing countries less fortunate have found here in Canada a refuge from mistrust and hatred and violence which has allowed them to achieve their potential in the rich soil of our freedom. Roy’s life is one such story. While Roy’s remarkable personal journey is unique to him, reading his book one cannot help but hear a familiar refrain that will resonate with millions of Canadians, because at its core it is the story of the immigrant experience. And in the final analysis, we are all children of immigrants.”

- Ratnavel, Roy (2023), Prisoner #1056, Viking Canada, ISBN 978-0-7352-4572-3

== Philanthropy ==
In May 2025, Roy Ratnavel and his wife, Sue Nathan, donated $1 million to the Scarborough Health Network Foundation to support inpatient mental health services at Birchmount Hospital. The donation, part of the "Love, Scarborough" campaign, aims to improve access to culturally sensitive and stigma-free mental health care for Scarborough’s diverse population. Ratnavel, a former political prisoner and civil war survivor from Sri Lanka, cited his personal experiences with trauma as motivation for supporting mental health initiatives.
