= S. Sellamuttu =

Sangarapillai "Sangare" Sellamuttu, OBE (Tamil: சங்கரப்பிள்ளை செல்லமுத்து, 25 February 1916 – 1993) was a Sri Lankan politician and philanthropist. He was a member of the Colombo Municipal Council and was elected Mayor of Colombo in 1951.

Educated at the Royal College, Colombo. He became private assistant to Sir Chittampalam Gardiner in 1944 and was appointed to the board of directors of Ceylon Theatres Ltd in 1946. In 1974 he became its chairman.

He was one of the founders of the Colombo Hindu College. and played a major role in the reconstruction of the Sri Sarwarjha Sidhi Vinayagar Temple in Modera. He was appointed an Officer of the Order of the British Empire in the 1953 New Year Honours.
