= Alistair Blair =

English cricketer

Personal information
- Full name: Alistair Edmunds Blair MBE
- Born: 16 November 1904; British Ceylon
- Died: 20 November 1984 (aged 80); Lympstone, Devon, England

Domestic team information
- Years: Team
- 1926/27: Ceylon
- 1926/27: Europeans (Ceylon)
- 1922: Devon

Career statistics
Competition	First-class
Matches	3
Runs scored	190
Batting average	47.50
100s/50s	–/2
Top score	95*
Balls bowled	–
Wickets	–
Bowling average	–
5 wickets in innings	–
10 wickets in match	–
Best bowling	–
Catches/stumpings	1/–
- Source: Cricinfo, 16 February 2011

Alistair Edmunds Blair MBE (16 November 1904 – 20 November 1984) was an English cricketer of Ceylonese descent. He was born in British Ceylon and was educated at Radley College in England.

Blair played his only Minor Counties Championship match for Devon against Dorset in 1922. Later, in January 1927 he made his first-class debut for the Europeans (Ceylon) against the touring Marylebone Cricket Club (MCC). The following month he played his only first-class match for the Up-Country XI against the same opposition and days later he represented Ceylon against the MCC once more. In his 3 first-class matches, Blair scored 190 runs at a batting average of 47.50, with a single half century high score of 95*.

Blair later served in World War II where he held the rank of lieutenant in the Black Watch. In 1943, he earnt a non-combatant gallantry award and was awarded with an MBE. The award was announced in The London Gazette on 9 July 1943. He died in Lympstone, Devon on 20 November 1984.
