= Chitrananda Abeysekera =

Sri Lankan broadcaster, writer and administrator

- Born: 7 March 1930; Kosgoda, Sri Lanka
- Died: 1992 (aged 61–62)
- Education: Nalanda College Colombo
- Occupation: Broadcaster
- Website: www.chitranandaabeysekera.org

Chitrananda Abeysekera (1930–1992) was a veteran broadcaster, poet, writer and an administrator. He joined Sri Lanka Broadcasting Corporation, then Radio Ceylon as a radio announcer and retired as the Director of Sinhala Services in 1989. He was also the President of Aganuwara Tharuna Kavi Samajaya (Athakasa) for more than a decade and initiated a lot of programs that benefited poets and the public alike. He restarted Kavi Suwanda, the poetry newspaper for poets. Chitrananda dedicated his whole life to Sinhala poetry and literature, not forgetting Radio Journalism.

== Early life ==
Agampodi Harindranath Chitrananda Mendis Abeysekera was born on 7 March 1930 in Kosgoda. He was the only child of Mr. Agampodi Louis Mendis Abeysekera and Mrs. Degiri Roslin Henry de Zoysa. He started his primary education at Kosgoda Sinhala School in Galle district but when he was nine, Chitrananda entered Nalanda College Colombo. He was a prominent member of the College Debating Team and also of the College Culture Club. He published his first book of poetry (Sarasavi Gitaya) as a student at Nalanda with the help of mentor and teacher U. A. S. Perera. Young Chitrananda was a corporal of Nalanda College Colombo Senior Cadet Corps.

Chitrananda began work as an English assistant teacher in a village school in the rural town of Menikkadavara in the Dedigama electorate in 1949. He left this post soon after to lend his hand to the Registrar General's department, Official Languages Commission and the Official Languages Bureau.

== As a radio journalist ==
On August 6, 1956, he began his career at Radio Ceylon as a guest producer of poetry, drama and features. He held the position of Director of Sinhala Services until his retirement in 1989. Abeysekera aimed to promote new talent through initiatives such as 'Nava Mihira', while also leading the Rural Services and Publication divisions. During the Hon. Dudley Senanayake era, Chitrananda was notable for overseeing the "Govi Jaya Handa" program, achieving significant popularity among rural Ceylon communities.

He got the opportunity to train on different mass media fields at ABC – Australia, BBC, AIBD – Malaysia, Pakistan and in 1980 he represented Sri Lanka at Non-aligned Broadcasters Conference in Freetown, Sierra Leone. He participated in several Poetry and Cultural events in Yugoslavia and China.

== Photo gallery ==
Govi Jaya Handa Awards Given for Farmers-1968
Chitrananda (1st left) was also the MC
Hon. Dudley Senanayake was presenting the awards. Mr Neville Jayaweera also in the picture

Chitrananda at the Non-aligned Broadcasters Conference, Freetown, Sierra Leone

Chitrananda (in the middle) at Australia Broadcasting Commission (ABC) in 1959 as a Radio & television Scholar

Chitrananda (in the middle) with Hindi actor, Dilip Kumar
and Ceylon Theatres' CEO, Mr Sellamutthu

Opening of the Rural Service of Radio Ceylon, (from left) George Leslie Ranasinghe, W.R.B. Rajakaruna, Chitrananda Abeysekera, Thevis Guruge, Neville Jayaweera, Stewart Wewel and Prof. Thilak Rathnakara

== As a poet, writer, lyricist ==
Chitrananda became the President of Young Poets' Association of Colombo (ATHAKASA) in 1979 and held this position till his death.
In addition to his initial school publication, Sarasavi Gitaya, Abeysekera published several other poetry collections and story books:

Poetry and Story Books

- Suli Sulang – Poetry, 1961
  Publisher: M.D. Gunasena & Co. Colombo, Sri Lanka
- Sakwala Dunna – Poetry
  Publisher: M.D. Gunasena & Co. Colombo, Sri Lanka
- Suduta Lilu Kavi – Poetry, 1974
  Publisher:Samayawardana Printers, Maligakanda Rd, Maradana, Sri Lanka
- Awatharaya – Short Strory
  Publisher: M.D. Gunasena & Co. Colombo, Sri Lanka
- Satan Bima Kandulu – Short Story
  Publisher: M.D. Gunasena & Co. Colombo, Sri Lanka
- Savi Nethi Ath – Novel
  Publisher: M.D. Gunasena & Co. Colombo, Sri Lanka
- Jaya Siri Maha Bodhi – Songs, 1982 – Collection of Popular Songs written by Chitrananda
  Publisher:Lassana Printers, Wellampitiya, Sri Lanka
- Kavya Manjari – Poetry, 1983
  Publisher:Samayawardana Printers, Maligakanda Rd, Maradana, Sri Lanka
- Kavya Pushpanjali – Poetry, 1983 – Awarded The Best Poetry Book at The State Literary Awards Festival by The Ministry of Cultural Affairs
  Publisher:Samayawardana Printers, Maligakanda Rd, Maradana, Sri Lanka
- Swarana Mali – Poetry, 1984
  Publisher:Captain Printers, Maradana 1st, Colombo 10, Sri Lanka
- Ran Sannasa – Poetry, 1985
  Publisher:Dulmini Printers, "Kamkarupura" Flats, Colombo 14, Sri Lanka
- Samanala Mahima – Poetry, 1986 – Awarded The Best Poetry Book at The State Literary Awards Festival by The Ministry of Cultural Affairs
  Publisher:Dulmini Printers, "Kamkarupura" Flats, Colombo 14, Sri Lanka
- Sewana Ruwana – Poetry, 1987
  Publisher:Dulmini Printers, "Kamkarupura" Flats, Colombo 14, Sri Lanka
- Susata Kala – Poetry, 1989 – Collection of Poems by Prominent Poets
  Publisher:Dulmini Printers, "Kamkarupura" Flats, Colombo 14, Sri Lanka
Samanala Mahima - Poetry, 1986

Popular radio songs

- Jayasiri Ma Bodhi: Singer – Dayaratne Ranatunge, Music – Rohitha Wijesuriya
- Vilwala Mal Pokuru Pokuru: Singer – Neela Wickramasinghe & T.M. Jayaratne
- Ma Ipaduna Mage Ratata Sewaya Karala: Singer – Edward Jayakody
- Nidahasa Gena Kavi Liyanna: Singer – Edward Jayakody
- Wediya Honda Narakai Me Loke: Singer – Mohideen Baig
- Kiri Ithirewa Nawa Wasare: Singer – H.R. Jothipala
- Alokaya Deka Yanna: Singer – Latha Walpola
- Swarnamali Se Kirane: Singer – Amara Ranatunge
- Ran Diya Bindu Mahaweli: Singer –
- Oba Yana Maga Nathara Novi: Singer –
- Ramya Bhumi Saru Bhumi: Singer –
- Jathiye Udara Sithum: Singer – Edward Jayakodi
- Oba Dan Keewath Kandulu Sala: Singer – Milton Mallawarachchi, Music – Sarath Dassanayake
- Sinarella Sisi Kirane: Singer – Milton Mallawarachchi, Music – Sarath Dassanayake
- Keewemi Oba Hata: Singer – H.R. Jothipala
- Man Podikale Dekkata Passe – H.R. Jothipala

Movie Songs

- Movie – Sirimali
  by Robin Thampoe in 1959
  Produced by P.L. Buddhadasa & Meena Thampoe
  Music by V. Krishnamurthi (Indian national)

Song – Karunawe Yukath Dharma: Singer – Latha Walpola
Song – Aakase Aawase: Singer – Latha and Dharmadasa Walpola
Song – Aay Wade Mey: Singer – Christy Leonard Perera and K. Rani
Song – Rani Karalini: Singer – Latha Walpola
Song – Pem Hada Moray: Singer – Latha Walpola
Song – Pun Chandra Paaya: Singer – Indrani Wijebandara and Sidney Attygalle
Song – Sinasewi Wando: Singer – Latha Walpola

- Movie – Nalangana
  by L.S. Ramachandran in 1960
  Produced by S. M. Nayagam
  Music by R. Muththusami

Song – Ho Surathal: Singer – Rukmani Devi
Song – Me Aawaa Mung Awaa: Singer – Rukmani Devi

- Movie – Pirimiyek Nisa
  by T. Somasekaran & K.A.W. Perera in 1960
  Produced by Premalal Edirisinghe (E.A.P. Edirisinghe)
  Music by R. Muththusami

Song – Agata Kadun: Singer – Latha Walpola
Song – Suwandathi Pipunu Kusum: Singer – Latha Walpola
Song – Dutu Da Wagema Lasanayi: Singer – Dharmadasa and Latha Walpola
Song – Meda Poti Athata Mitata: Singer – Mohideen Baig, Srimathi Rasodari and chorus

- Movie – Suvineetha Lalini
  by Robin Thampoe in 1961
  Produced by Robin Thampoe
  Music by R. Muththusami

Song – Pem Ganine: Singer – Angeline de Lanerolle (Gunatillake) and H. R. Jothipala
Song – Doy Doya Puthe: Singer – Latha Walpola
Song – Loku Podi Katath: Singer – Chandra de Silva and L. M. Perera
Song – Amme Badagini Wenawa: Singer – Angeline de Lanerolle, Indrani Wijebandara and chorus
Song – Maha Polowe Upan: Singer – Mohideen Baig
Song – Sapawath Pawuluk Paramarithe: Singer – Mohideen Baig
Song – Thani We Mey Loke: Singer – Latha Walpola
Song – Lipe Mule: Singer – Sidney Attygalle and Angeline de Lanerolle
Song – Nihaday Gamanaya: Singer – H. R. Jothipala, Angeline de Lanerolle and chorus
Song – Suhada Madura Preme: Singer – H. R. Jothipala and Angeline de Lanerolle

- Movie – Mage Putha
  by Devendra Goyel in 1961
  Dubbing Direction by Thewis Guruge
  Music by P.L.A. Somapala
  Original Hindi Movie:Chirag Kahan Roshni Kahan

Song – Assaya Gone Tik Tik Tik I: Singer – Latha Walpola & Geetha
Song – Assaya Gone Tik Tik Tik II: Singer – Latha Walpola & Geetha
Song – Nivi Nivi Dilihe Tharuwe I: Singer – Indrani Wijayabandara
Song – Nivi Nivi Dilihe Tharuwe II: Singer – Latha Walpola

- Movie – Samiya Birindage Deviyaya
  by Robin Thampoe

Song – Kothanaka Sitiyath Oba Melowe: Singer – H.R. Jothipala
Song – Lassana Rattharan Babo: Singer – Rukmani Devi
Song – Kiyanna Ran Kanda: Singer – Rukmani Devi
Song – Monawa Hithagena: Singer – Rukmani Devi
Song – Oba Dekumen Ma Sith: Singer – H.R. Jothipala

- Movie – Sudo Sudu
  by Robin Thampoe in 1965
  Music – Somadasa Elvitigala

Song – Savibala Yakada Wagei: Singer – W.D. Amaradewa
Song – Prema Sebawii: Singer – Latha & Dharmadasa Walpola
Song – Heenmenike Mage: Singer – W.D. Amaradewa

- Movie – Sarana
  by Asoka Pieris
  Music – Mohamed Sali & P.L.A. Somapala
  Singers – Sujatha Perera, Latha & Dharmadasa Walpola, Manel Upasena

Asoka Pieris has also written few songs for this movie

- Movie – Sudu Sande Kalu Wala
  by Robin Thampoe in 1963

Song – Denna Eka Sirurey: Singer – H.R. Jothipala
Song – Maa Langa Hinehee: Singer – H.R. Jothipala
Song – Wanasanna Jeewe: Singer – H.R. Jothipala

- Movie – Kolankarayo
  by Thissa Nagodawithana
- Movie – Sigiri Kashyapa
  by Bindu Gunasekera in 1966
  Music – M.K. Rocksami

Song – Narapathiya Wetha Yanne: Singer – H.R. Jothipala
Song – Pape Galee Lowa: Singer – A.J. Kareem

- Movie – SRI 296
  Premnath Morayas in 1959
  Produced by Premnath Morayas
  Music by P.L.A. Somapala
  Original Hindi Movie: C.I.D.

Song – Wediya Honda Narakaine: Singer – Mohideen Baig
Song – Man Awa Hirabath Kala: Singer – H.R. Jothipala
Song – Me Enna Sanasannam: Singer – Latha Walpola
Song – Doyya Gan Ma Kiri Ketiya: Singer – Indrani Wijayabandara
Song – Pami Loke Rengum: Singer – Indrani Wijayabandara & H.R. Jothipala
Song – Sasi Piye: Singer – G.S.B. Rani Perera
Song – Duk Gini Godaka: Singer – G.S.B. Rani Perera
Song – Ma Soya Aa Nisa: Singer – Indrani Wijayabandara

- Movie – Suhada Divi Piduma
  in 1962
- Movie – Sulalitha Sobani
  in 1964

Movie Related

- Movie – Sepali
  by W.M.S. Thampoe in 1958
  Produced by Robin Thampoe
  Film Script: Chitrananda Abeysekera & Suriya Kumar

Story from the Hindi movie Dulari – 1949

- Movie – Daruwa Kageda?
  by Herbi Seneviratne in 1961
  Produced by W.M.S. Thampoe
  Screen Play: Chitrananda Abeysekera

Story from the Hindi movie Dulari – 1949

- Movie – Sirimali
  by Robin Thampoe in 1959
  Produced by P.L. Buddhadasa & Meena Thampoe
  Dialogues: Chitrananda Abeysekera
- Movie – Sudo Sudu
  by Robin Thampoe in 1965
  Dialogues & Screen Play: Chitrananda Abeysekera

Other Links

- Features | Online edition of Daily News – Lakehouse Newspapers
- Latha Walpola – Nightingale of Sri Lanka | Asian Tribune
- English girl of Lankan parents for Karate World Cup
- Remembering Sri Lanka's Nightingale: 30th Death Anniversary of Rukmani Devi
- Nalanda Old Boys
