= Nallamma Williams =

Sri Lankan medical doctor

- நல்லம்மா வில்லியம்ஸ்
- Born: December 25, 1880; Jaffna, Northern Province, British Ceylon
- Citizenship: Sri Lankan
- Education: Vembadi Girls High School; Madras Medical College; Edinburgh School of Medicine for Women
- Occupations: medical doctor, women's rights activist
- Known for: specialisation in western medicine, vocal advocate for women's suffrage
- Spouse: Satyavagiswara Aiyar

Nallamma Murugesu Williams (née Satyavagiswara Aiyar; Tamil: நல்லம்மா வில்லியம்ஸ், also known as Nallamma Satyavagiswara Aiyar, Nallamma Murugesan) (25 December 1880 - ?) was a Sri Lankan medical doctor, feminist and women's rights activist. She is considered to be the first Sri Lankan Tamil woman to become a doctor of western medicine in her country. She was known for advocating for women's rights during her career especially for her work towards fighting for women's suffrage in Sri Lanka.

== Biography ==
Nallamma Williams was born on 25 December 1880 into an orthodox Tamil Christian family in the Jaffna Peninsula, in the Northern Province of what was then British Ceylon (modern day Sri Lanka). At the time, Sri Lanka was under British colonial rule in a typical patriarchal society. She pursued her primary education at the Vembadi Girls High School in Jaffna.

== Career ==
Williams applied for the Calcutta University entrance examination, at a time when education for women was encouraged solely for the motive of enhancing marriage proposals. She defied the stereotypes by prioritizing career over marriage despite the societal norms of the time, when parents were mostly keen on encouraging their daughters to marry. She passed the Calcutta University entrance examination with first-class honours, topping the charts in both India and Ceylon and was conferred with the prestigious Keshub Chandra Sen Prize.

She pursued her higher studies at Madras Medical College in 1904. At the time Ceylon Medical College had started enrolling women for medical studies, but allocated minimum admission seats for women while men enjoyed the privilege of securing guaranteed 100% medical entrance. Due to the low enrollment opportunities for women in Sri Lankan medical colleges during the 1900s, her parents allowed her to study abroad in India by applying for medical studies at Madras Medical College and she graduated with her Licentiate of Medicine and Surgery in 1909. She pursued medical studies, at a time when only very few women had the privilege of accessing higher education in medical field due to the social stigma on women's access to education.

In September 1909, she left Colombo Port by sea for Great Britain and then travelled to Scotland in order to obtain the ‘Scottish Triple’ qualification. In October 1909, she enrolled at the Edinburgh School of Medicine for Women, at a critical juncture when the women’s suffrage movement was gaining momentum across Scotland. She successfully completed the Triple qualification from the Faculty of Physicians and Surgeons (Glasgow), Royal College of Surgeons (Edinburgh) and Royal College of Physicians (Edinburgh). In May 1911, she returned to her native Jaffna and her first official appointment as a newly qualified physician was at a hospital in Inuvil.

She collaborated with her husband Satyavagiswara Aiyar who was working as a trade unionist and the couple worked together for the social welfare cause, advocating for fair treatment and higher quality working environment for the plantation and urban workers in Sri Lanka. In 1919, Williams attended the first session of the Ceylon National Congress, where she nominated a firm proposal advocating for women’s suffrage and was hailed as one of Sri Lanka's earliest advocates for gender equality in the history of the country's politics. Initially, she found resistance against her fight towards advocating for women's right to vote and one of Sri Lanka's prominent freedom fighters Ponnambalam Ramanathan rejected her idea. He claimed that women’s participation would threaten the sanctity of the home as well as domestic life, likening female suffrage to “casting pearls before swine”. Despite the strong backlash and severe opposition, Williams' resolution for women's right to vote motion was passed by the Ceylon National Congress. She became founding secretary of the Women's Franchise Union which turned out to be the first organization to campaign in a systematic way for women's suffrage in Sri Lanka.

Nallamma's contributions and efforts towards working on a constitutional reform to mandate the basic human right of voting for women in Sri Lanka was recognized, when Ceylon officially became the first British non-white colony to achieve universal suffrage under the Donoughmore Constitution. Eventually, 1931 Ceylonese State Council election was conducted as the first election in a British colony which used universal adult franchise. She had also attended political conferences in India, where she learnt the political backdrop behind the Indian freedom movement campaign and the elements of Indian freedom movement had been later adopted into the Ceylonese nationalism.

Her career achievements were documented in archival form by the Royal College of Physicians and Surgeons of Glasgow (RCPSG), which includes a collection of historical licentiate registers and archives.
