= Arumaipperumal =

Chieftain Arumaipperumal of Batticaloa, an eastern part of the Indian Ocean island known today as Sri Lanka, led a rebellion against the British colonial authorities in 1803..

== Colonial occupation ==
For centuries the European colonial occupiers (the Portuguese, the Dutch and the British) occupied by violent force and ruled the countryside in Batticaloa.

The rule by colonial forces angered the Batticaloa peasants against the occupiers, leading to the rebellion.

== The rebellion ==
Initially rebellion captured all parts of Batticaloa except Puliyanthivu, an islet in the district. There was an important fort that was occupied by the British. The British troops had ferociously fought to defend the fort. Once the British were able to hold the fort more reinforcements were sent and they fought a scorched earth war under Captain Johnston, which crushed the rebellion.

The British captured Arumaipperumal after a brutal encounter and sent him to their colonial capital Colombo where he was executed in 1803.
