= Vanni Mouse =

- Film poster
- Directed by: Tamiliam Subas
- Written by: Tamiliam Subas
- Produced by: Tamiliam Subas
- Starring: Mice (Sinthu, Thulani)
- Cinematography: Tamiliam Subas
- Edited by: Tamiliam Subas
- Music by: Nitharsan
- Release date: 9 September 2009 (Norway)
- Running time: 10 minutes
- Country: Norway
- Languages: Tamil, Sinhala

Vanni Mouse (Tamil: வன்னி எலி) is a short film produced and directed by Tamiliam Subbas, a Sri Lankan Tamil from the diaspora. It won the best award in an international festival. It won the best film award in the fiction category in the nine-day 11th International Short and Independent Film Festival (ISIFF) in Dhaka 2010. Commenting on the award, Barrister S. J. Joseph of Eelavar Cine Arts Council, based in London, told TamilNet this was the first time a Sri Lankan Tamil artist had been awarded at an international film festival.

"As far as content is concerned, the film is against violence perpetrated in the name of national integrity. To convey this message, the director picked up a form, which is an interesting combination of wild life cinematography, surrealistic backdrop and realistic incident. A monotonous journey of some mice ends up in an unexpected revelation of a human tragedy. The approach is quite original for anti-war film," said the Jury Members Shaji N. Karun, Masihuddin Shaker, and Abu Sayeed during the announcement of the award.

== Synopsis ==
Vanni Mouse is a short film following the journey of two mice which flew from the wood of Vanni. The two inseparable couple end unfortunately in an internment camp (Manik Farm) located in Vavuniya (Sri Lanka) where hundreds of thousands tamils are imprisoned by the Sri Lankan government. These two mice witness the tragedy of many innocent civilians behind the barbed wires, which remains as unspoken truth. Whether the two will escape from the terrifying environment is the climax of this short film.

== Awards ==
- Best Short film 4th Ulagayutha International Tamil film festival India 2011.
- Second Prize Makkal TV Ten Minute Stories India 2010.
- Best Critic Award 8th International Tamil Film Festival Canada 2010.
- Best Fiction Award 11th International Short and Independent Film Festival (ISIFF) in Dhaka 2010.
- Best short film Norway Tamil Film Festival Awards 2010
- Special Prize Periyar thirai 2009

== Official selection ==
- 14th Jihlava International Documentary Film Festival Czech Republic 2010
- 9th International Documentary and Short Film Festival (DokuFest) Kosovo 2010
- The European Independent Film Festival 2010
- Vibgyor International Film Festival 2010 under theme "Focus of the Year: `South Asia"

== Academic analysis ==
The film has been studied in various academic works:

- Visual Culture, Spectatorship and Humanitarian Disaster: Vanni Eli and the Representation of the Sri Lankan Civil War - Christ University
- Representations of Civilian Trauma in the Sri Lankan Civil War: A Study of Select Movies - Mahatma Gandhi University, Kerala
