= Ganesh Sittampalam =

- Born: 11 February 1979 (age 47); Croydon, U.K.
- Education: University of Surrey; University of Oxford

Ganesh Sittampalam (born 11 February 1979) is a British computer specialist and former record holder youngest person to pass an A-Level.

Sittampalam was born on 11 February 1979 in Croydon to Arjuna Sittampalam, a Tamil, and Nela, a Sinhalese, originally from Sri Lanka. He is the grandson of Ceylonese government minister C. Sittampalam. He is from Surbiton.

At the age of eight Sittampalam received an A grade in O-Level mathematics, becoming the youngest person to receive an A grade in O-Level. A year later in June 1988, aged nine years and four months, he received A grades in A-Level mathematics and further mathematics, becoming the youngest person to pass an A-level, which is typically taken at age 18. Sittampalam received official recognition from the Guinness Book of World Records in April 1989.

Sittampalam became Britain's youngest university student when he joined the University of Surrey aged 11. He studied for just one day a week at the university, spending the remaining four days continuing his education at King's College Junior School. Sittampalam graduated from the University of Surrey in July 1992, aged 13 and four months, with a first-class bachelor's degree in mathematics. He was Britain's youngest graduate for several years. He went on to receive a master's degree in computing and a doctorate in intentional programming from the University of Oxford in his 20s.

Sittampalam works on GitHub Copilot as a software engineer and lives in Cambridgeshire. He is married to Amanda and has a son, Alexander, and a daughter, Heather.
