= Hindu College, Colombo =

Hindu school in Colombo, Sri Lanka

- இந்துக் கல்லூரி, கொழும்பு

Location
- 77 Lorensz Road; Bambalapitiya; Colombo, Western, 00400; Sri Lanka; 6°53′1.09″N 79°51′42.73″E

Information
- School type: National School
- Motto: Tamil: கற்றாங்கு ஒழுகுக (Kaṟṟāṅku oḻukuka) (Follow what you study)
- Religious affiliation: Shaivism
- Established: 12 February 1951; 75 years ago
- Sister school: Ramanathan Hindu Ladies College
- Principal: Mrs. Vasuki Suthahar (2026-present)
- Staff: 150
- Grades: Grade 1-13
- Gender: Male
- Enrollment: 4000 (approx.)
- Average class size: 40
- Language: Tamil
- Area: 2 ha (approx.)
- Houses: Valluvar, Ilango, Kambar, Bharathi and Navalar
- Colors: Chocolate & gold
- Song: "Vaazhthuvom Vananguvom"
- Website: hcc.lk

Hindu College, Colombo (Tamil: இந்துக் கல்லூரி, கொழும்பு) or abbreviated as HCC is a Tamil language National School situated in Bambalapitiya, in the suburbs of Colombo, Sri Lanka. It was founded in 1951 with the name of "பிள்ளையார் பாடசாலை" (Pillayar Paadasaalai) by Justice C. Nagalingam Q.C. and 23 others. Hindu College Colombo is now considered one of the most prominent Tamil national schools in the country due to its reputation in the way of providing education. Mrs. Vasuki Suthahar, the current Principal of the school, assumed office on 20th April 2026.

== History ==
Founding and early years

The school's history dates back to 12 February 1951, when it commenced its services as "Pillayar Padasalai" with 48 students and volunteer teachers. The dream of establishing a school for the Tamil-speaking Hindu community in Colombo was realized through the efforts of its founders, as well as the support of parents, alumni, and well-wishers.

The school initially started in a small building and expanded over the years to accommodate the growing number of students. In 1955, classes above the fifth grade were transferred to the then-newly established Hindu College at Ratmalana. The primary school continued in Bambalapitiya.

=== Development and growth ===
The first inter-house sports meet of the school was held in 1968. Students were divided into main houses namely; Kambar, Valluvar, Barathi and Illango (the four most important individuals in Tamil literature) which were used to represent students during the annually held sports meet.

Under various principals, including N. Sayendra and T. Subramaniam, the school continued to grow, adding new buildings, facilities, and academic offerings. In 1977, classes for the General Certificate of Education (Advanced Level) were introduced, and the school's name was changed to Colombo Hindu College.

The school faced challenges in 1983 when it served as a refugee camp during communal disturbances. However, it resumed regular operations in 1984.

The school underwent significant development with the construction of multiple three-storey blocks, laboratories, administration buildings, and sports facilities. In 1991, the government declared the school a National School.

=== Recent years ===
In the late 20th and early 21st centuries, Colombo Hindu College continued to evolve, introducing computer classes, establishing a Botanical Garden, and celebrating its Golden Jubilee in 2001. Various infrastructural enhancements, such as new buildings, computer labs, and a dental clinic, were added.

On 19 September 2016, the school's first practice pitch was opened and renowned cricketers such as Lasith Malinga and Nuwan Kulasekara were invited as chief guests for this historical moment. In around 2018, the college underwent a significant infrastructure overhaul. Construction for a sports complex, including a swimming pool, commenced under the leadership of T.P. Parameswaran, who was the principal of the college at that time. Additionally, he successfully oversaw the enlargement and refurbishment of the college grounds.

The sports complex construction was suspended amidst the economic crisis due to financial constraints. In July 2024, however, college principal K. Nagendra secured government funding, enabling the project to recommence and move toward its envisioned completion. The project is expected to be completed in 2026, coinciding with the 75th anniversary of the school.

== Services ==
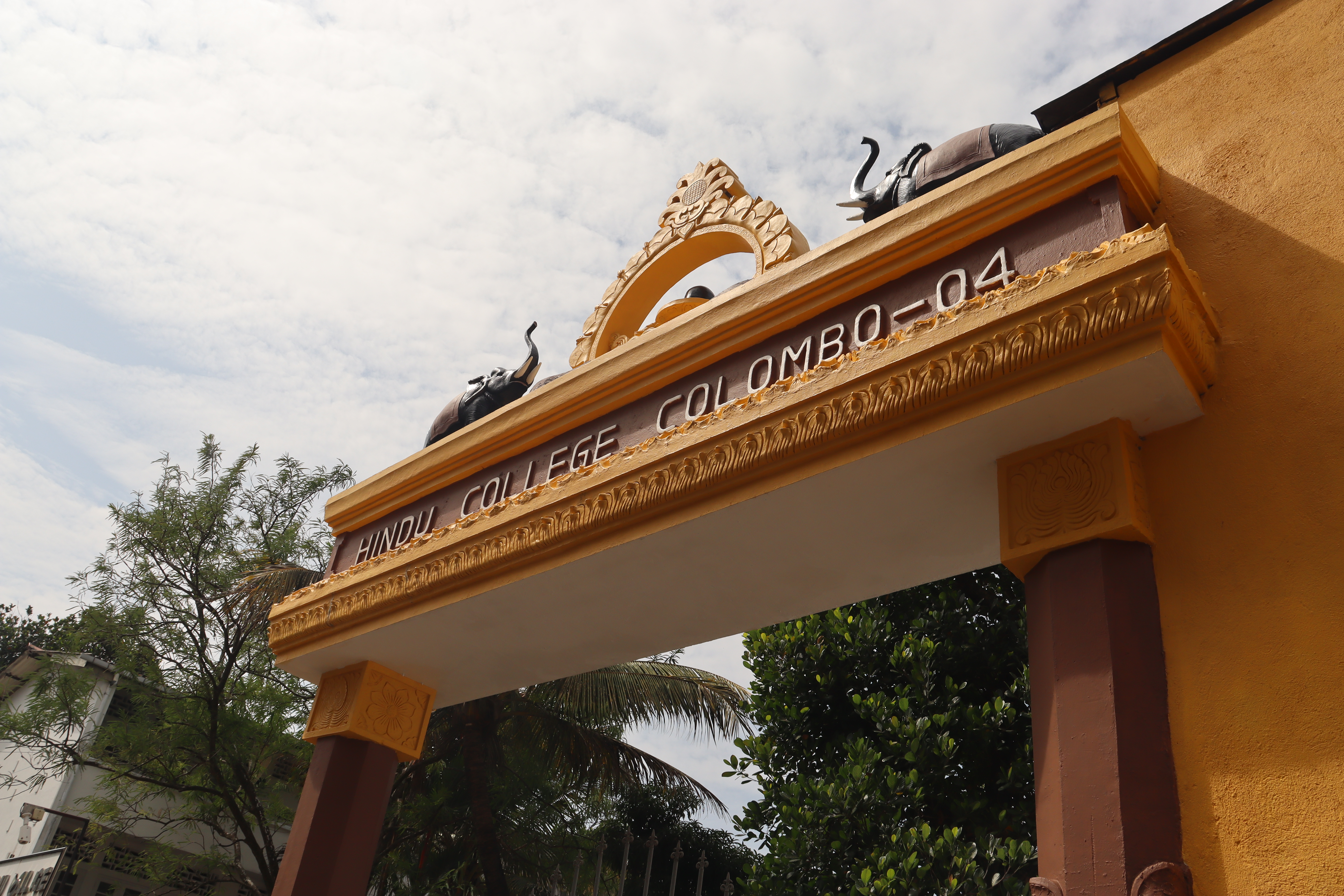
Main gateway to the school

The school provides Tamil and English medium education for pupils aged 6 to 19 in its Primary, Secondary, and Tertiary sections. The school consists of multi-divisional classes for Grades 1-13. A division usually consists of 40 students and currently, there are 5 divisions in Grade 1, gradually increasing up to 10 divisions in the Advanced Levels. The classes are also fitted with modern equipment. The Advanced Level classes are all equipped with smart boards and projectors while most of the classes in Grades 6-11 have interactive displays.

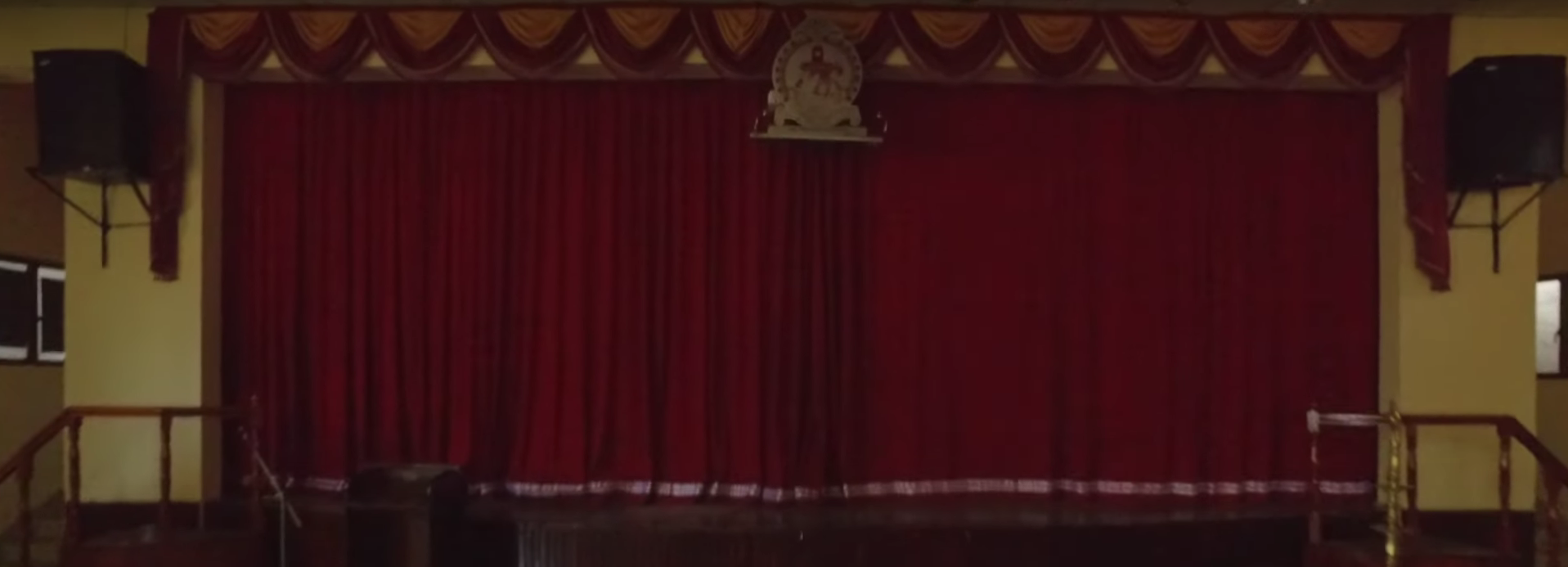
The School Auditorium (prior to the modern renovations)

Nearly all the buildings in the school are purpose-built to accommodate the growing number of pupils and the changes in the educational system. The buildings in the school are built as 'blocks' and currently there are about 10 blocks in the vicinity, all containing various sectors and serving various purposes. For example, The Library Block includes the science laboratory, the chemistry laboratory, the main computer lab, the media room, a dental clinic and the school library. The latest addition is the block with the school auditorium and the new A/L classes.

== Notable achievements and contributions ==
Throughout its history, Hindu College Colombo has produced notable alumni who have made significant contributions in various fields. The school has been supported by dedicated individuals and organizations, including the Old Boys' Associations in United Kingdom, United States and Australia.

In November 2023, a 10-year old boy rose to prominence and limelight and garnered widespread attention in social circles after claiming an eight-wicket haul without conceding any run representing Colombo Hindu College in an Under-13 interschools division II tournament match against MDH Jayawardene MV Battaramulla which was played at the Ediriweera Sarathchandra Grounds, Mulleriyawa. Selvasekaran Rishiyudhan bowled a marathon spell of 9.4 overs and took 8 wickets without conceding a run by sending down nine maiden overs in a row to help bowl out MDH Jayawardene MV Battaramulla for just 28 runs and as a result Colombo Hindu College won by a massive margin in terms of an innings victory.

== Big Match and other academic events ==
Various events are held regularly throughout the years. School's Annual Concert, Muththamil Vizha and Kazhai Vizha are considered some of the most prominent Tamil events in the neighbourhood. These events usually take place at the College Auditorium or at the nearby Saraswathi Hall.

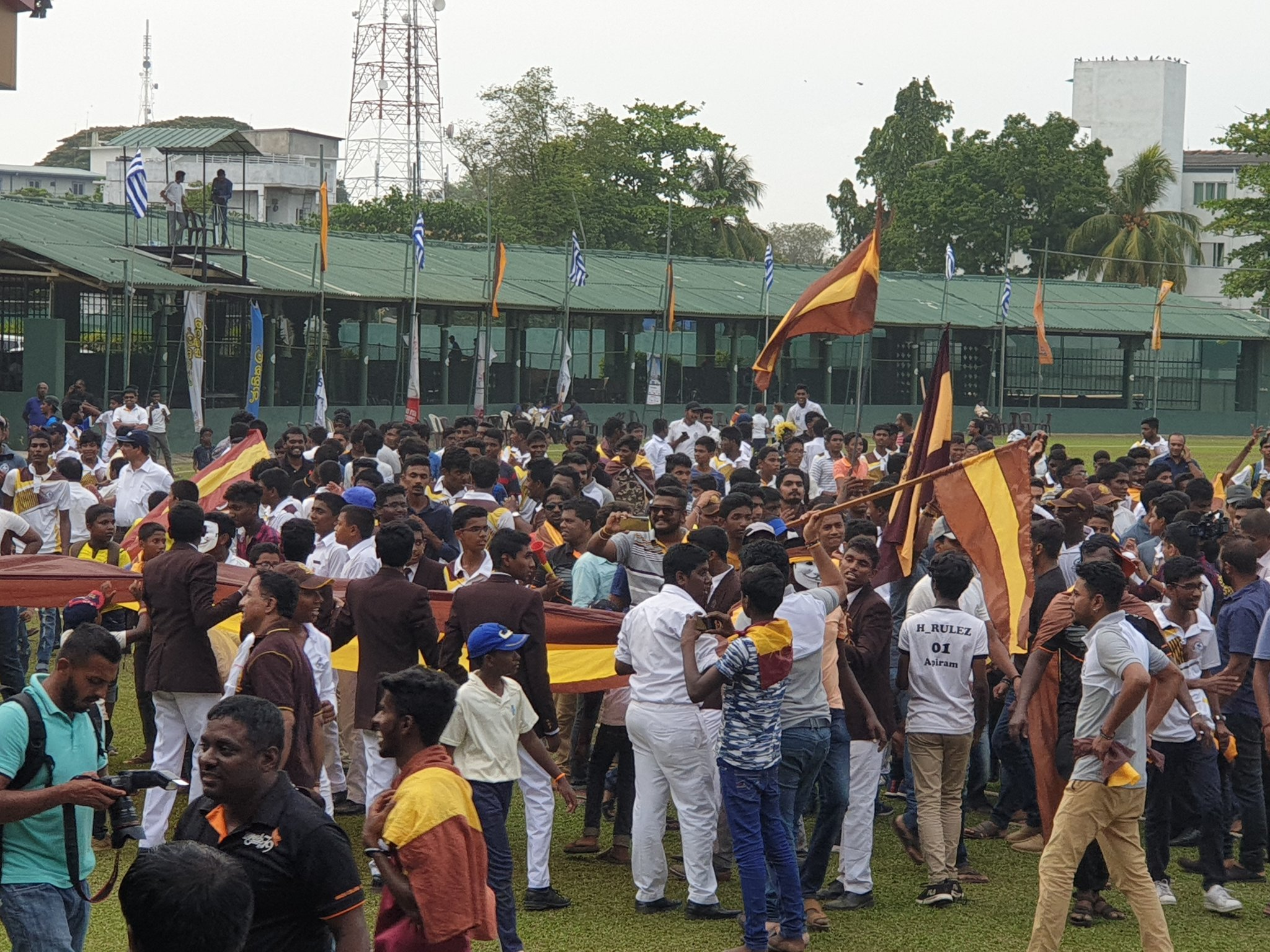
Celebration after winning the 10th Battle of the Hindus

The Big Match played between Hindu College, Colombo and Jaffna Hindu College is one of the significant events for the college. The Big Match, named "Battle of the Hindus", was officially inaugurated in 1981 and has been held somewhat regularly throughout the years. The match takes place at the home ground of each school alternatively. The battle of the Hindus has been given its significance at the College since the 10th match between the colleges. P. Sara Oval was selected as the venue for the match and has since been developed as the home ground for Hindu College, Colombo. The 10th Battle of the Hindus is the first Big match held at the P. Sara Oval and currently it is a common venue for many other Big matches between schools.

A special ‘Solladal’ debate encounter is also organized in conjunction with the Big Match cricket series. This intellectual contest was inaugurated in 2016, adding an academic dimension to the spirited rivalry between the two institutions. The first Solladal Cup was won by Hindu College Colombo, marking a memorable beginning to this tradition.

== Founders ==
The Hindu Educational Society, consisting of 24 Hindu leaders, played a crucial role in founding the school. The first president of the society, Hon. Justice C. Nagalingam, along with other prominent figures such as S. Sellamuttu, Sir Kanthiah Vaithianathan, S.Mahadevan, V.A. Kandiah, Senator Peri Sundaram and Alagu Subramaniam contributed to the establishment of the school.

== School flag and emblem ==
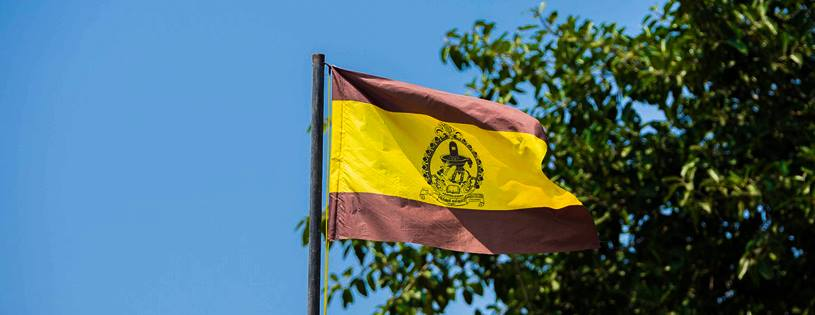
The school's flag hoisted on Founder's Day

The flag and emblem are symbols of the school's identity and values. The flag, designed by the school's first principal, M. Pathmanathan, features three horizontal stripes: gold in the centre, and brown on top and bottom. The college emblem is positioned in the centre of the gold stripe.

The emblem itself depicts the school's motto in Tamil: "கற்றாங்கு ஒழுகுக" (pronounced "Katraangu Oluhuga"), which roughly translates to "Follow what you study".

== School anthem ==
The anthem was written in 1976 by Veeramani Aiyyar of Jaffna, one year after Mr Sangaralingam was appointed as the principal of the college. Several individuals played key roles in the anthem's creation, including S. T. Kanagaligam, Dr. Velaayuthapillai and M. Balasubramanium.

The anthem is played during the school's closing every day. It is also played at school events following the national anthem.
