= Claude Selveratnam =

- Born: Colombo, Sri Lanka
- Occupation: Broadcaster
- Employer: Radio Ceylon / Sri Lanka Broadcasting Corporation
- Known for: Broadcasting

Claude Selveratnam was a popular radio announcer of Radio Ceylon - the oldest radio station in South Asia. Selveratnam read the English news bulletins of Radio Ceylon as well as presenting some of the popular radio programs of the day such as - 'Holiday Choice'.

He joined a select band of Radio Ceylon announcers who enjoyed iconic status in South Asia in the 1950s and 1960s. Millions of listeners tuned into hear announcers like Claude Selveratnam.

== See also ==
- Radio Ceylon
- Sri Lanka Broadcasting Corporation
- List of Sri Lankan broadcasters

== Bibliography ==
- Wavell, Stuart. - The Art of Radio - Training Manual written by the Director Training of the CBC. - Ceylon Broadcasting Corporation, 1969.
