= Arjuna Sittampalam =

Arjuna Sittampalam is a financier in the United Kingdom. He is recently appointed as Research Associate at the EDHEC Risk and Asset Management Research Centre.

He is the son of the Hon Cathiravelu Sittampalam, the first Cabinet Minister of Posts and Telecommunications in independent Ceylon and father of Ganesh Sittampalam the Guinness record holder for the youngest person to pass an A-Level in 1988.

Sittampalam has written three books, Corporate Governance Activism, Coming Wars in Investment Management Evolving Techniques in Investment Management. He has also contributed articles about investment to different publications.
