= St. Xavier's Boys' College =

Location
- Main Street; Mannar, Mannar District, Northern Province; Sri Lanka
- 8°59′10.80″N 79°54′32.20″E

Information
- School type: Public national 1AB
- Motto: Fortes in fide (Strong in faith)
- Founded: 1870
- School district: Mannar Education Zone
- Authority: Ministry of Education
- School number: 1201002
- Principal: Rev.Bro.Santhiyagu(fsc)
- Teaching staff: 68
- Employees: 200-300
- Grades: 1-13
- Gender: Boys
- Age range: 6-19

St. Xavier's Boys' College is a national school in Mannar, Sri Lanka.

== See also ==
- Category:Alumni of St. Xavier's Boys' College
- List of schools in Northern Province, Sri Lanka
- St. Xavier's Girls' College
- List of Jesuit sites
