= Nadarajah Selvarajah =

- Born: October 20, 1954 (age 71); Dandugama, Colombo
- Occupation: writer

Nadarajah Selvarajah (Tamil: நடராஜா செல்வராஜா) (b. October 20, 1954, Jaffna) is a Sri Lankan librarian, writer and bibliographer. Selvarajah has written more than 43 books until June 2017. So far he has compiled 11 volumes of Nool thettam - a bibliography of Tamil books. He has also compiled a bibliography of Tamil publications in various countries such as Malaysia and Singapore (Malaysian-Singapore Noolthettam). He has also compiled a volume of Noolthettam in English, which contains English publications of Sri Lankan Tamils.

Selvarajah was born in Dandugama in Colombo District in 1954, and moved to Anaikoddai in Jaffna in his early 16's. He had his early education in Negombo, Vivekananda Maha Vidyalayam and St. Mary's College. His career began in 1976 as a librarian at Ramanathan College, Chunnakam in Sri Lanka. And then served as the Central Librarian for the Sarvodaya Shramadana Movement in the Jaffna District. During 1981-82 he served for a year in Indonesia under the United Nations Development Programme, where he organised a Model Rural Community Library System for that country in the Village Marengmang near the provincial capital, Bandung, in the Island of Java. In 1983 he became the Chief Librarian at the Evelyn Rutnam Institute for Inter-Cultural Studies affiliated to the Jaffna College. In 1990 he became an advisor to the Department of Hindu Culture under the Ministry of Cultural Affairs in Sri Lanka. Since 1991 Mr. Selvarajah is a consultant to the Jaffna Public Library.

Selvarajah currently lives in Luton with his family. He has retired from the Postal Services (Royal mail Group UK) after 18 years of Services in March 2017. He is the founder of the charity European Tamil Documentation and Research Centre (ETDRC) in the United Kingdom in 2009. He is an active member, and Sri Lankan representative of the Books Abroad, Scotland service, through which has freely provided books to libraries in Sri Lanka. In 2017 he was awarded, the UK Informed Peer Recognition Award (IPRA). He is the first Sri Lankan who has received this prestigious award for his services to the Community, and the Country as a professional librarian.

== Source ==
- Noolthettam information booklet (In Tamil and English)
