= Viswanather Casipillai =

Viswanather Casipillai (Tamil: விஶ்வநாத காஶீபிள்ளை) was a Crown Proctor and co-founder of the Jaffna Hindu College.

== Biography ==
His grand nephew Cathiravelu Sittampalam was the first Cabinet Minister of Posts and Telecommunications in the independent Sri Lanka.

Viswanather Casipillai was born to a distinguished Tamil Family whose ancestry can be traced to the ancient Royal Kuriyans, highly respected noblemen of the king’s Court of the Tamil Kingdom of Nallur. Two descendants of these noblemen, Vanniyasingam Kuriyan and Canagasekara Kothanda Kuriyan, lived in Jaffna later during the Dutch regime.

In the 19th century, Visvanathar son of Vinayakar, who descended from Canagasekara Kothanda Kuriyan, abandoned the prestigious Kuriyan title as no longer relevant under the British and became known as an entrepreneur for leasing large extends of crown land at Ariyalai for salt production on large scale. Subsequently, many of his descendants were to distinguished themselves in public life of North Province.

Visvanathar had two sons Arumugam and Casipillai. The former died young and his children were brought up by the latter, his younger brother. Arumugam's eldest son Cathiravelu was C. Sittmapalam's father. He functioned as a magistrate and district judge and was the first editor of Tamil Journal "Inthu sathanam" and founder of the Saraswathy library.

Visvanthar's second son Casipillai while being C.Sittampalam’s grand-uncle was, also, his wife's grandfather. He was one of the most illustrious citizens of the North. Leonard Woolf, the British Civil Servant, author of the classic 'Village in the jungle' and husband of Virginia, a member of the Bloomsbury set ( which included Keynes, the economist) published in his autobiography a letter from Casipillai as a testimonial of his own (Woolfs) standing among Tamils. Casipillai worked closely with Sri Arumuga Navalar in promoting Hinduism, and functioned as secretary of the Saiva Paripalanai Sabey and was a co-founder and subsequent manager of Jaffna Hindu College. One of the houses there is Casipillai House in his honour. He was a great philanthropist, and was often referred to as Mudisoodamannan. He was widely sought after for his brains and original contribution to problems and called the Brains trust. Other terms were Jaffna and Mannar's Thanai Perusa Thalaivan and illangai Perumahan.

The establishment of Sitthivinayagar Kovil and Parvathy Vithyasalai were among two of his achievements. Another single contribution was his participation in the agitation for a railway to Jaffna crowned with success in 1906. His son Casipillai Arulampalam and grandson Arulampalam Visvananthan continued to follow their fathers to become one of the prestigious lawyers in Jaffna.

== See also ==
- List of political families in Sri Lanka
