= Europeans cricket team (Ceylon) =

The Europeans cricket team was a cricket team based in Ceylon and composed of colonial officials. The team played a single first-class match in January 1927 against the touring Marylebone Cricket Club. The match, which was played at the Colombo Cricket Club Ground, ended in a draw.

== Scorecard ==
Europeans
154 all out
&
194/4
Match drawn

George Neale 76
Ewart Astill 5/52 (21.2 overs)

Alistair Blair 95*
Peter Eckersley 2/57 (9.4 overs)

Colombo Cricket Club Ground, Colombo
Umpires: W.S. Flindall and Frank Ondaatje

Marylebone Cricket Club
419 all out

Bob Wyatt 76
Edward Wedlake-Lewis 5/87 (23 overs)
