= A. Canagaratnam =

Ceylon Tamil lawyer

A. Canagaratnam MLC
- ஆ. கனகரத்தினம்
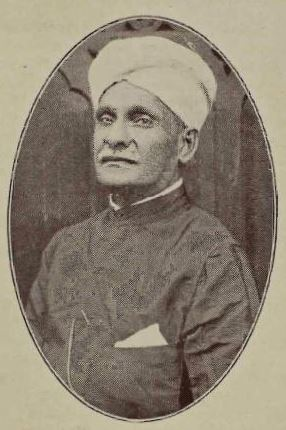

Unofficial Member (Northern Province South), Legislative Council of Ceylon

Personal details
- Born: 1873
- Died: 1929 (aged 55–56)
- Education: Jaffna Central College; Wesley College
- Profession: Lawyer
- Ethnicity: Ceylon Tamil

Arumugam Canagaratnam (Tamil: ஆறுமுகம் கனகரத்தினம்; 1873–1929) was a Ceylon Tamil lawyer and member of the Legislative Council of Ceylon.

== Early life and family ==
Canagaratnam was born in 1873. He was the son of Visuvanathan Arumugam. Canagaratnam was educated at Jaffna Central College and Wesley College, Colombo. He had his higher education in Calcutta.

Canagaratnam's nephew C. Sittampalam was a government minister.

== Career ==
Canagaratnam joined the legal profession after finishing his education.

Canagaratnam became chairman of the Rural Education Development Board in the 1920s. He was also chairman of the Jaffna Local Board and Jaffna Urban Council. He was elected to the Legislative Council of Ceylon as the member for the Northern Province South at the 1924 election.

Canagaratnam campaigned for the establishment of the University of Ceylon and edited a nationalist journal called The Ceylon Patriot. He built Stanley College, which was later renamed Canagaratnam Maha Vidyalayam, using his own funds. Canagaratnam Road is also named after him.
