= Jitto Arulampalam =

Australian businessman

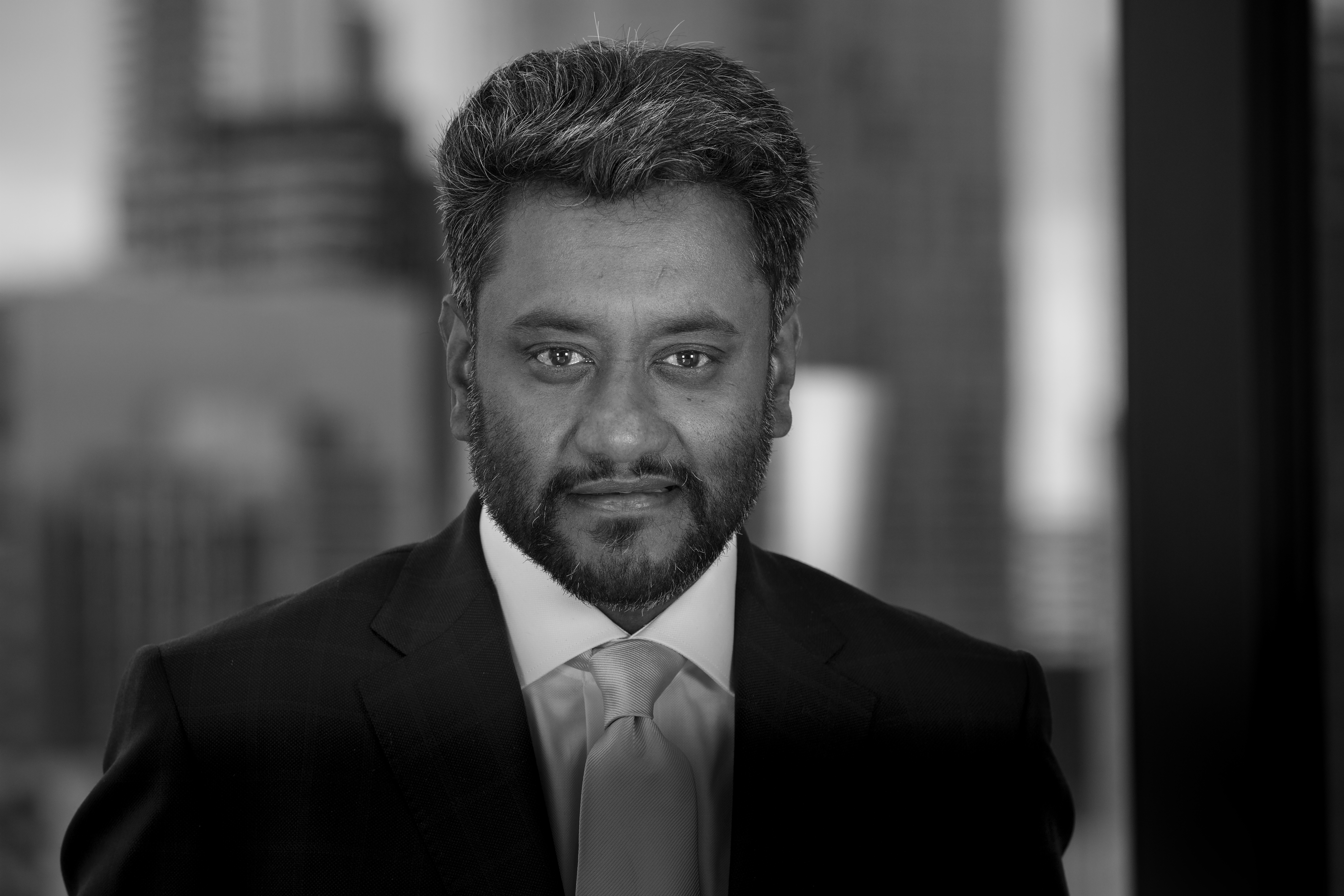
- Born: Sri Lanka
- Known for: Board-level roles in publicly listed Australian companies
- Title: Co-founder and CEO of RedOwl

Jitto Arulampalam is an Australian entrepreneur, and business executive of Sri Lankan origin. He is the founder of Roddington Capital and co-founder of RedOwl. He has served in senior board positions across various sectors including technology, finance, and biotechnology.

== Early life and career ==
Arulampalam relocated to Australia with his family in the mid-1980s from Sri Lanka.

Arulampalam began his career in the Australian financial services sector, holding operational and strategic roles at Westpac. He later moved into corporate development and capital markets, working across corporate restructuring, capital raising, and public company management in Australia and international markets.

== Business and investment career ==
In the mid-2000s, Arulampalam was appointed chief executive officer of Newsnet Limited, where he led the company toward a public listing. In 2006, the company was recognised by Australian Financial Review MIS Magazine as one of the “Top 25 Global Rising Stars”.

By the late 2000s, he had held board and chair positions in several Australian listed companies, including Atos Wellness, and was referenced in Australian business media in connection with corporate governance and capital markets activity.

In 2010, he co-founded Fortis Mining Limited, an ASX-listed potash exploration company with assets in Kazakhstan. The company attracted significant attention in Australian business media following its initial public offering, and later received international coverage during its development phase, including a CNBC interview in which Arulampalam discussed its resource potential and strategy, as well as further coverage in Australian business media during its Australian Securities Exchange listing period.

In 2013, Arulampalam joined Progen Pharmaceuticals Ltd, an Australian biotechnology company, as a non-executive director and was subsequently appointed chairman later that year.

Arulampalam has held a number of board-level positions in Australian companies. In October 2023, he was appointed Non-Executive Director and Deputy Chairman of Rectifier Technologies Limited, an ASX-listed power electronics manufacturer.

== Fintech and RedOwl ==
Arulampalam is the co-founder and chief executive officer of RedOwl, a Melbourne-based financial technology company focused on artificial intelligence-driven expense management and cash-flow optimisation for small and medium-sized enterprises (SMEs).

RedOwl has received independent coverage in Australian and international business media. The Australian reported on the company’s efforts to raise capital to expand its AI-enabled corporate spending platform, quoting Arulampalam on the role of automation and predictive intelligence in financial management.

The company was also selected for Mastercard’s global Start Path Small Business program, which supports fintech companies developing solutions for SMEs.

== Venture capital and governance ==
Arulampalam serves as chairman of SeedX Ventures, an Australian venture investment firm. He has also chaired and advised multiple private and public companies across the technology, diagnostics, and investment sectors.

He is a member of professional governance bodies, including the Australian Institute of Company Directors.

== Public and community involvement ==
Arulampalam has participated in philanthropic and community initiatives, including sponsorship support for post-conflict reconciliation projects in Sri Lanka. In 2014, he was quoted by The Sunday Leader in connection with support for the Murali Harmony Cup, a reconciliation-focused cricket tournament held in Northern Sri Lanka.

He serves as a director of Opportunity International Australia, an international development organisation focused on financial inclusion.

Arulampalam collaborated with Professor S. Pathmanathan and sponsored the publication of Glimpses of an Ancient Civilisation: Society and Culture in Jaffna (300 BC to AD 500). He is a collector of rare first‑edition books and ancient coins, with interests in epigraphy and numismatics. According to the book, he provided access to his private coin collection for its historical research.
