= Rohan Jayasekera (writer) =

Sri Lankan writer (born 1961)

Rohan Jayasekera (born January 1961) is an English freelance journalist and advocate specialising in freedom of expression rights issues in conflict zones and repressive states. He was born in Holloway, North London, of mixed Sri Lankan-Scots-Irish parentage.

== Career ==
Jayasekera began his journalistic career as an apprentice reporter in Borehamwood, Hertfordshire in 1980, worked for a variety of London and national newspapers during the 1980s and 1990s before going abroad, covering half a dozen conflicts thereafter including Bosnia, Afghanistan and Iraq. He is a former managing editor of the Institute for War & Peace Reporting and former deputy CEO of the UK quarterly magazine Index on Censorship, where he was responsible for the charity's international programmes and fundraising. He is now a freelance digital publisher managing a series of new R&D, advocacy and journalism projects on freedom of expression rights issues in conflict zones and repressive states

Between 2008 and the years running up to and during the Arab Spring, Jayasekera chaired the Tunisia Monitoring Group (IFEX-TMG), a campaigning group of 21 Arab and international free expression rights groups supporting dissidents in Tunisia.

== Background ==
Jayasekera's maternal grandfather left Ireland as a child, fought Mosleyites in Cable Street and spent the war in the Royal Navy, which exposed him to three life changing experiences: US segregation in Norfolk, Virginia; Soviet segregation in Murmansk, Siberia, and the war itself. His paternal grandfather was the first Sinhalese owner-manager of an independent plantation in pre-war Sri Lanka. His uncle was Kingsley Jayasekera, a Sri Lankan singer, actor and play producer.

== Controversies ==
=== Jayasekera and David Irving ===
Between 2001 and 2004, Jayasekera ran an associated blog for the UK quarterly magazine Index on Censorship at www.indexonline.org. In May 2001, he provoked outrage from critics of the Holocaust denier David Irving by agreeing to share a stage with him at the Oxford Union to oppose the proposition that "this house would restrict the free speech of extremists". The previous year a High Court judge had found that Mr Irving was "an active Holocaust denier; that he is anti-Semitic and racist and that he associates with right-wing extremists who promote neo-Nazism". Strong protest followed, including direct appeals to the then chair of the board, Michael Grade, and objections from some of Jayasekera's colleagues.

At a time before Irving's jailing in Austria, Jayasekera was criticised for breaking the so-called "no platform" rule. This policy – formally adopted by Britain's National Union of Students and other groups – requires, first, that fascists should not be given public forum, and secondly that if they do gain a platform other political parties and organisations should refuse to share it with them. Jayasekera declined to comply. The debate was eventually cancelled on the advice of the police.

=== John Malkovich ===
There was similar protest a year later when Jayasekera went online to defend Index on Censorship's refusal to cancel a charity performance of the John Malkovich film The Dancer Upstairs at London's Institute of Contemporary Arts (ICA). In May 2002, Malkovich had been asked who – as the star of Les Liaisons Dangereuses – he would like to fight a duel with. He picked Robert Fisk, The Independent newspaper's Middle East correspondent, and disgraced constituent-hopping MP George Galloway, adding that rather than duel with them, he would "rather just shoot them". Fisk reacted with outrage. Reporters sans Frontieres condemned Malkovich's comments, but Jayasekera dismissed them as "flippant" in an article for the Index website. "You can cry wolf once too often over unrealistic threats", Jayasekera wrote. "It undermines the case for real action when real and present dangers to journalists raise their heads." He added:

Over the years since (the Rwanda genocide), and not without criticism, Index on Censorship has turned to reporting the areas where the right to free speech conflicts with these other rights. Index on Censorship is a journalistic enterprise, not a campaigning agency. This has freed it to make judgement calls – some say to equivocate – on when and where and how and why the freely expressed word can be a direct threat to other human rights.

The fundraising event went ahead in December 2002 despite a street protest outside the ICA. Index on Censorship has since changed its strategy to include a number of successful advocacy campaigns in the UK and abroad.

=== Theo van Gogh ===
Jayasekera spent much of 2003 and 2004 in Iraq working on Index on Censorship's "local media rights support" projects in Baghdad, but in late 2004 he was again involved in controversy after writing an online article that to many readers seemed to condone or justify the murder of the Dutch film-maker Theo van Gogh. The article claimed that van Gogh was a "free-speech fundamentalist" who had been on a "martyrdom operation[,] roar[ing] his Muslim critics into silence with obscenities" in an "abuse of his right to free speech". Describing van Gogh's film Submission as "furiously provocative", Jayasekera concluded by describing his death as:

"A sensational climax to a lifetime's public performance, stabbed and shot by a bearded fundamentalist, a message from the killer pinned by a dagger to his chest, Theo van Gogh became a martyr to free expression. His passing was marked by a magnificent barrage of noise as Amsterdam hit the streets to celebrate him in the way the man himself would have truly appreciated. And what timing! Just as his long-awaited biographical film of Pim Fortuyn's life is ready to screen. Bravo, Theo! Bravo!"

There were many protests from both left- and right-wing commentators at the article. The veteran feminist commentator Germaine Greer called the item "vile vomit" and told the London Sunday Telegraph in December 2004, that:

"The problem with Index on Censorship's position is that, by its nature, they have to publish things that they don't agree with in order to prove their own point. I would hope that by giving a fanatic a platform and listening to what he says, that people would be able to see how crazy that person is and refute his arguments. On the other hand, no one ever went broke underestimating the intelligence of the public."

Nick Cohen of The Observer claimed in December 2004 that Jayasekera:

"...told me that, like many other readers, I shouldn't have made the mistake of believing that Index on Censorship was against censorship, even murderous censorship, on principle – in the same way as Amnesty International is opposed to torture, including murderous torture, on principle. It may have been so in its radical youth, but was now as concerned with fighting 'hate speech' as protecting free speech."

Ursula Owen, the editor-in-chief of Index on Censorship, and a co-founder of the feminist publishers Virago strongly repudiated Cohen's account in a letter to the Observer. She later apologised for Jayasekera's original comment article, saying she didn't think "the tone (was) right".
