= C. Sittampalam =

Ceylon Tamil civil servant, politician, Member of Parliament and government minister

Hon. C. Sittampalam MP CCS
- சி. சிற்றம்பலம்

Minister of Posts and Telecommunication
- In office 1947–1952
- Succeeded by: V. Nalliah

Minister of Industries, Industrial Research and Fisheries
- In office 1948–1948
- Preceded by: George E. de Silva
- Succeeded by: G. G. Ponnambalam

Member of the Ceylonese Parliament for Mannar
- In office 1947–1956
- Succeeded by: V. A. Alegacone

Personal details
- Born: 13 September 1898
- Died: 3 February 1964 (aged 65)
- Education: St. Peter's College, Cambridge
- Profession: Civil servant
- Ethnicity: Ceylon Tamil

Cathiravelu Sittampalam (Tamil: கதிரவேலு சிற்றம்பலம்; 13 September 1898 – 3 February 1964) was a Ceylon Tamil civil servant, politician, Member of Parliament and government minister.

== Early life and family ==
Sittampalam was born on 13 September 1898. He was the son of A. Cathiravelu, a proctor and member of the Jaffna Local Board. He was educated at Jaffna Central College and Royal College, Colombo. He won many prizes at Royal College including the English Essay Prize, the De Zoysa Science Prize and the Mathematics Prize. Aged 15 he passed the Senior Cambridge with first class honours and distinction in mathematics. After school Sittampalam joined St. Peter's College, Cambridge on a science scholarship and graduated with a degree in mathematics.

Sittampalam was a member of a distinguished family. His brother C. Ponnambalam and brother-in-law C. Casipillai were Mayors of Jaffna. His uncle A. Canagaratnam was a member of the Legislative Council. His great-uncle V. Casipillai was a crown proctor and one of the founders of Jaffna Hindu College.

Sittampalam married Kamalambikai. They had four daughters (Devalakshmi, Pushpalakshmi, Yogalakshmi, and Mallikalakshmi) and one son (Arjuna).

== Career ==
Sittampalam was called to the Bar in the Middle Temple. He joined the civil service in 1923 and served in various positions including Assistant Government Agent and District Judge. He later left the civil service and practised as an advocate.

Sittampalam stood as an independent candidate in Mannar at the 1947 parliamentary election. He won the election and entered Parliament. He was persuaded to join the United National Party-led government and on 26 September 1947 he was sworn in as Minister of Posts and Telecommunication. He was made Minister of Industries, Industrial Research and Fisheries after George E. de Silva was unseated by an election petition.

Sittampalam was re-elected at the May 1952 parliamentary election but lost his cabinet position. He was defeated at the 1956 parliamentary election by the Illankai Tamil Arasu Kachchi (Federal Party) candidate V. A. Alegacone.

Sittampalam died on 3 February 1964. In February 2004 Sri Lanka Post issued a commemorative stamp of Sittampalam.

== See also ==
- List of political families in Sri Lanka
