= Thambiah =

Thambiah தம்பையா
- Pronunciation: Tampaiyā
- Gender: Male
- Language: Tamil

Origin
- Region of origin: Southern India; North-eastern Sri Lanka

Other names
- Alternative spelling: Tambiah; Tambyah; Thambaiyah; Thambiayah

Thambiah (Tamil: தம்பையா) is a Tamil male given name. Due to the Tamil tradition of using patronymic surnames it may also be a surname for males and females.

== Notable people ==
=== Given name ===
- Stanley Jeyaraja Tambiah (1929–2014), Ceylonese social anthropologist

=== Surname ===
- Alfred Thambiayah (1903–2009), Ceylonese businessman and politician
- H. D. Thambiah (1926–1992), Ceylonese lawyer and judge
- H. W. Thambiah (1906–1997), Ceylonese academic, diplomat, lawyer and judge
- Leaena Tambyah (1937–2023), Singaporean special education advocate
- Mabel Thambiah (1916 - 1987), Sri Lankan educator
- R. R. Crossette-Thambiah, Ceylonese lawyer
- Thambiah Ahambaram (1913–1962), Ceylonese politician
- Tambyah Murugaser (1924–1994), Sri Lankan sportsman and sports administrator
- Thambiah Nadaraja (1917–2004), Sri Lankan lawyer and academic
- Thambiah Pathmanathan (born 1956), Singaporean footballer
- Thambaiyah Mudaliyar Sabaratnam (1895–1966), Ceylonese lawyer and politician
- Winslow Thambiah Ivers Alagaratnam (1895–1977), Ceylonese civil engineer
