= Mabel =

Mabel is an English female name derived from the Latin amabilis, "lovable, dear".

== History ==
Amabilis of Riom (died 475) was a French male saint who logically would have assumed the name Amabilis upon entering the priesthood: his veneration may have resulted in Amabilis being used as both a male and female name, or the name's female usage may have been initiated by the female saint Amabilis of Rouen (died 634), the daughter of an Anglo-Saxon king who would have adopted the name Amabilis upon becoming a nun.

Brought by the Normans—as Amable—to the British Isles, the name was there common as both Amabel and the abbreviated Mabel throughout the Middle Ages, with Mabel subsequently remaining common until c. 1700, from which point its usage was largely restricted to Ireland, Mabel there being perceived as a variant of the Celtic name Maeve, until the name had a Victorian revival in Britain, facilitated by the 1853 publication of the novel The Heir of Redclyffe by Charlotte M. Yonge, which features an Irish character named Mabel Kilcoran; Yonge's novel also features a character named Amabel, but her novel only significantly boosted the popularity of the name in the form Mabel, which became immensely popular in both the British Isles and the United States.

At the start of the 20th century, Mabel's popularity began a slow decline which accelerated from the 1930s; the name has seen very light usage since the 1960s. Due to its origin as an abridgement of Amabel it has been surmised that Mabel was originally pronounced with a short A, the name's pronunciation with a long A dating only from its mid-19th-century revival.

== Notable people ==
- Mabel of Bury St. Edmunds, 13th-century embroiderer
- Mabel Albertson (1901–1992), American character actress
- Mabel Esther Allan (1915–1998), British author
- Mabel Washbourne Anderson (1863–1949), American writer
- Mabel Lucie Atwell (1879–1964) British children's illustrator and author
- Mabel Marks Bacon (1876–1966), American hotelier
- Mabel Bagenal (c. 1571–1595), Countess of Tyrone
- Mabel Ballin (1887–1958), American actress
- Mabel de Bellême (died 1079), Countess of Shrewsbury and Lady of Arundel
- Mabel Besant-Scott (1870–1952), British occultist
- Mabel Thorp Boardman (1860–1946), American philanthropist involved with the American Red Cross
- Mabel Bocchi (1953–2025), Italian basketball player
- Mabel Browne, Countess of Kildare (c. 1536–1610)
- Mabel Bryant (1883–1948), English field hockey and cricket player and umpire
- Mabel Capper (1888–1966), British suffragette
- Mabel Augusta Chase (1865–1939), American physicist
- Mabel Cheung (born 1950), film director from Hong Kong
- Mabel Colhoun (1905–1992), Irish photographer, teacher and archaeologist
- Mabel Condemarín (1931–2004), Chilean educator
- Mabel Wheeler Daniels (1877–1971), American composer, conductor, and teacher
- Mabel Dove Danquah (1905–1984), Ghanaian journalist, political activist and creative writer
- Mabel Dearmer (1872–1915), English novelist, dramatist and children's book author/illustrator
- Mabel Sessions Dennis (1895–1990), American newspaper editor, publisher, and socialite
- Mabel DeWare (1926–2022), Canadian politician, curler, and retired senator
- Mabel Smith Douglass (1874–1933), American academic
- Mabel Dwight (1875–1955), American artist
- Mabel Evelyn Elliott (1881–1968) American Physician and Humanitarian
- Mabel Fairbanks (1915–2001), American figure skater
- Mabel Farrer, one of the United Kingdom's first female police officers and Cumbria's first female Special Constable
- Mabel FitzRobert, Countess of Gloucester (c. 1100–1157), Anglo-Norman noblewoman
- Lady Mabel Wentworth-Fitzwilliam (1870–1951), English politician
- Mabel French (1881–1955), Canadian lawyer and women's rights activist
- Mabel Gardiner Hubbard (1857–1923), wife of Alexander Graham Bell
- Mabel Grammer (1915–2002), American journalist
- Mabel Farrington Gifford (1880–1962), American speech therapist
- Mabel B. Holle (1920–2011), player in the All-American Girls Professional Baseball
- Mabel Jones (c. 1865–1923), British physician and suffragette
- Mabel Katz, Argentinian-American speaker and TV show host
- Mabel King (1932–1999), American singer and actress
- Mabel Hyde Kittredge (1867–1955), home economist and social worker
- Mabel Landry (1932–2025), American track and field athlete
- Mabel Lang (1917–2010), American archaeologist
- Mabel Ping-Hua Lee (1896–1966), Chinese advocate for women's suffrage in the United States
- Mabel Lee, Australian translator
- Mabel Lockerby (1882–1976), Canadian artist
- Mabel Dodge Luhan (1879–1962), American patron of the arts
- Mabel Malherbe (1879–1964), South African politician
- Mabel Manzotti (1938–2012), Argentine film, stage and television actress
- Mabel McVey (born 1996), English singer and songwriter
- Mabel Mercer (1900–1994), American cabaret singer
- Mabel Mosquera (born 1969), Colombian weightlifter
- Mabel Normand (1892–1930), American comic actress
- Mabel Paige (1880–1954), American stage and film actress
- Mabel Parton (1881–1962), English tennis player
- Mabel Cosgrove Wodehouse Pearse, Irish writer
- Mabel Poulton (1901–1994), English actress
- Mabel Pryde (1871–1918), Scottish artist
- Mabel Rayner (c.1890-1948), English botanist
- Mabel Rweqana, South African politician
- Mabel Sonnier Savoie (1939–2013), American singer and guitar player
- Mabel Seeley (1903–1991), American mystery writer
- Mabel A. Shaw (1880 – June 15, 1962)
- Mabel L. Smith (1924–1972), known professionally as Big Maybelle, American R&B singer
- Mabel Stark (1889–1968), tiger trainer
- Mabel Keaton Staupers (1890–1989), pioneer in the American nursing profession
- Mabel St Clair Stobart (1862–1954), British suffragist and aid-worker
- Mabel Strickland (1899–1988), Maltese journalist and politician
- Mabel Taliaferro (1887–1979), American actress
- Mabel Thambiah (1916–1987), Sri Lankan educator
- Mabel Loomis Todd (1856–1932), American editor and writer
- Mabel Todd (disambiguation), several people
- Mabel Landrum Torrey (1886–1974), American sculptor
- Mabel Tuke (1871–1962), English suffragette
- Mabel S. Ulrich (1876–1945), American medical doctor and health educator
- Mabel Vernon (1883–1975), American suffragist
- Mabel Rose Welch (1871–1959), American painter of portrait miniatures
- Mabel Walker Willebrandt (1889–1963), U.S. Assistant Attorney General from 1921 to 1929 under the Warren G. Harding administration
- Mabel Sine Wadsworth (1910–2006), American birth control activist and women's health educator
- Mabel Wagnalls (1871–1946), American pianist, writer, philanthropist
- Mabel May Woodward (1877–1945), American impressionist painter
- Mabel Martin Wyrick (1913–2003), American writer
- Mabel Yuan (born 1987), Chinese actress and singer
- Princess Mabel of Orange-Nassau (born 1968), member of the Dutch royalty

=== Stage name or ring name ===
- Mabel Matiz (born 1985), Turkish pop singer
- Mabel (singer) (born 1996), English pop singer, daughter of singer Neneh Cherry
- Mabel (wrestler), a ring name of American professional wrestler Nelson Lee Frazier Jr. (1971–2014)

== Fictional characters ==
- Mabel Motley, female lead character on the 1976–2000 comic strip Motley's Crew
- Mabel Pines, a main character in the animated series Gravity Falls
- Mabel "Madea" Simmons, the character portrayed and created by Tyler Perry in films and plays
- Mabel the Ugly Stepsister, from the animated film Shrek the Third
