= Kittu (Tamil militant) =

Sri Lankan Tamil rebel

Colonel Kittu
- கிட்டு
- Born: S. Krishnakumar; 2 January 1960
- Died: 16 January 1993 (aged 33); Indian Ocean
- Years active: 1978 –1993
- Organization: Liberation Tigers of Tamil Eelam

Sathasivam Krishnakumar (Tamil: சதாசிவம் கிருஸ்ணகுமார்; 2 January 1960 – 16 January 1993; commonly known by the nom de guerre Kittu) was a Sri Lankan Tamil rebel and leading member of the Liberation Tigers of Tamil Eelam, a separatist Tamil militant organisation in Sri Lanka.

== Early life and family ==
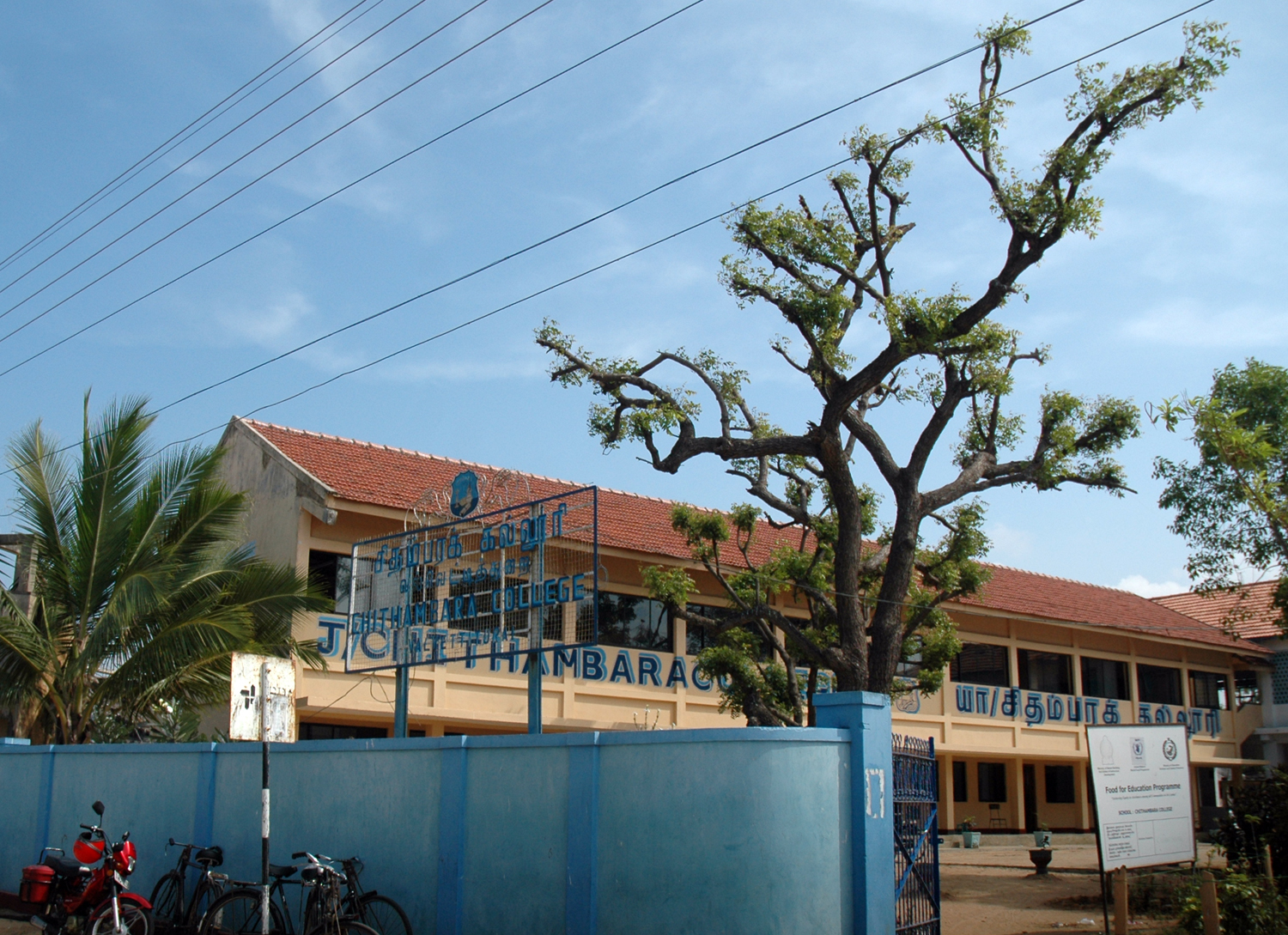
Chithambara College

Krishnakumar was born on 2 January 1960. He was the son of Sathasivam and Rajaluxmy (Seethalakshmi) from Valvettithurai in northern Ceylon. Sathasivam owned the Kumar Achchakam printing press in Nelliady. Rajaluxmy was a supporter of the Illankai Tamil Arasu Kachchi and took part in the 1961 satyagraha.

Krishnakumar had one brother and two sisters. He was educated at Chithambara College, Valvettithurai and Velautham Maha Vidyalayam. V. Prabhakaran and Mahattaya were also educated at Chithambara College. Prabhakaran was also a close relative and friend of Krishnakumar.

== LTTE ==
Krishnakumar was involved in helping Tamil refugees who fled to the Jaffna Peninsula following the 1977 anti-Tamil riots. Deeply affected by the suffering of the refugees, Krishnakumar joined the militant Liberation Tigers of Tamil Eelam (LTTE) in 1978. He was given the nom de guerre Kittu. He then travelled, along with LTTE leader Prabhakaran, to Madras, India.

LTTE member Seelan (Charles Lucas Anthony), a close associate of Prabhakaran, was killed in a confrontation with the Sri Lanka Army in Meesalai on 15 July 1983. On 20 July 1983 the Sri Lankan government banned all reporting about the LTTE. In response, the LTTE planned to ambush an army military convoy. On 23 July 1983, at around 11.30 pm, the LTTE ambushed the Four Four Bravo military patrol in Thirunelveli near Jaffna. Thirteen soldiers were killed on the spot, two died later and a number of LTTE cadres were also killed. LTTE members involved in the ambush included Prabhakaran, Kittu, Appaiah, Chellakili, Iyer, Pulendran, Santos and Victor. The ambush precipitated the Black July anti-Tamil riots in which between 400 and 3,000 Tamils were killed by Sinhalese mobs.

Kittu then became the LTTE's Jaffna regional commander. Unusually, Kittu would personally lead LTTE's operations against the Sri Lankan military. Kittu is credited with instilling discipline amongst the LTTE cadres. He would punish harshly LTTE cadres who violated their code of ethics and civilians who committed minor offences. He established kangaroo courts in Jaffna peninsula to create a state of fear amongst the population.

In April 1986 the LTTE banned rival militant organisation Tamil Eelam Liberation Organization (TELO) and set about killing its leader Sri Sabaratnam. Sabaratnam went on the run, fleeing from TELO's main base in Kalviyankadu to Neervely, then to Kopay and finally to Kondavil. The LTTE found out that he was in Kondavil and they, led by Kittu, cordoned off the area and started a house-to-house search, using loud hailers to warn local residents not to shelter Sabaratnam. On 6 May 1986 the LTTE discovered Sabaratnam in a tobacco field and Kittu shot him in the leg to prevent him escaping. Sabaratnam pleaded with Kittu for his life but Kittu shot him using a machine gun. Sabaratnam's bullet ridden body was displayed at Kondavil bus stand before being handed over to his family.

Kittu's ruthless side was tempered by respect for enemies whom he considered to be brave. During the 1986 siege of Jaffna fort, Kittu met with Captain Jayanath Kotelawala, whom he considered to be brave, several times and arranged for firewood and mangoes to be provided for soldiers trapped inside the fort. Kittu met Vijaya Kumaranatunga, Sinhalese actor and leftist politician, in Jaffna in October 1986. Kittu led the LTTE's delegation in the short lived peace talks with the Sri Lankan government in Kankesanthurai in December 1986.

On 13 March 1987 (Note: Another source gives the date as 13 March 1987.) Kittu was travelling in a jeep to meet his girlfriend Cynthia, a medical student at the University of Jaffna, when, on Second Cross Street, Jaffna a gunman fired at the jeep and threw a grenade inside it. Two of Kittu's bodyguards were killed and a third injured seriously. Kittu's right leg was seriously damaged and had to be amputated. As a result, his military career came to an end. The LTTE blamed rival militant groups Eelam People's Revolutionary Liberation Front and TELO for the attempted assassination and quickly "rounded up" members of these groups.

Kittu then re-located to Madras where took charge of the LTTE's propaganda office. During the LTTE-India conflict in Sri Lanka Kittu met with Research and Analysis Wing agents for talks aimed at bringing peace and implementing the Indo-Lanka Accord. Kittu sent LTTE cadre Johny back to Sri Lanka to get instructions from Prabhakaran who was operating from the Vanni jungles. However, Johny was ambushed by the Indian Peace Keeping Force and killed. The LTTE-India talks collapsed and in August 1988 twelve LTTE offices in Tamil Nadu were closed and 154 LTTE activists, including Kittu, were arrested. The LTTE activists threatened to launch a hunger strike as they were being detained without charge. Kittu was released in October 1988 and deported back to Indian held Jaffna. He then travelled to the Vanni, leaving his girlfriend Cynthia in Jaffna.

In 1989, when peace negotiations were being carried out between the LTTE and Sri Lankan government, Prabhakaran decided to send Kittu to London for treatment to his amputated leg. Kittu was flown from the Vanni to Colombo in a Sri Lankan military helicopter. He was taken to the British High Commission where he received a visa to travel to the UK. However, before leaving Sri Lanka, Kittu married Cynthia, who had travelled from Jaffna to Colombo, on 25 October 1989 at the hotel where the LTTE peace talk delegation were staying. Kittu then travelled to the UK, joined later by Cynthia.

Whilst in the UK Kittu took charge of the LTTE's international secretariat in London. It's alleged that Kittu threatened and extorted money from the growing number of Sri Lankan Tamil refugees in the UK. This led to numerous complaints being lodged with UK officials and eventually immigration officials started the process for deporting Kittu. Pre-empting this, Kittu travelled to Paris and then onto Switzerland where he applied for asylum. Next, he travelled to Sweden and then to Vienna where he received orders from Prabhakaran to return to the Vanni.

Kittu then flew to Singapore. His movements thereafter remain unclear but it is believed he travelled to Thailand where he boarded the MV Yahata. Earlier, whilst in Karachi, the Yahata had been loaded with a huge cargo of weapons by the Pakistan Navy on the orders of the Inter-Services Intelligence. The Yahata left Phuket with the cargo of weapons and several LTTE cadres, including Kittu, on board. Whilst at sea the ship changed its name to MV Ahat. There are differing accounts of the events which then occurred. According to one account the Indian Navy and Indian Coast Guard intercepted the 400 tonne Ahat on 13 January 1993 south-east of Madras, sailing without navigation lights en route to Madras. According to second account an Indian Coast Guard Dornier aircraft, whilst on a routine surveillance flight between Point Calimere and Point Pedro, spotted the 280 tonne Ahat on 6 January 1993. The Indian Navy kept the ship under surveillance, noting that it was sailing suspiciously towards the Indian coast, frequently changing course. On 12 January 1993 the Indian had confirmation that the Ahat belonged to the LTTE and carried several LTTE cadres. The Indian navy launched Operation Zabardast and on 14 January 1993 two coast guard ships, the CGS Vivek and INS Kirpan, intercepted the Ahat and escorted it towards the Indian coast. According to a third account, the Ahat was intercepted by the Indian navy on 13 January 1993. Three days later, 700 km south-east of Madras, the LTTE allowed the crew to leave the Ahat after which they blew up the ship. According to a fourth account, which was supported by the LTTE, the Ahat was intercepted by the Indian navy on 13 January 1993 in international waters about 290 miles east of Hambantota.

According to the official Indian military version, the Ahat was spotted on 6 January 1993 in Indian exclusive economic zone waters, acting suspiciously and changing course frequently. The Indian coast guard and navy shadowed the Ahat and on making radio contact, found out that the ship was carrying arms, ammunition and explosives for the LTTE. After being surrounded by the Indian navy, the crew set the ship, which was about 12 nautical miles off Madras, on fire. Nine crew members jumped overboard and were rescued by the navy. The remaining crew and LTTE cadres were given an opportunity to surrender but according to the Indians, Kittu threatened to blow the ship up if the Indian tried to board it. Attempts to stop the fire and prevent it from sinking were delayed by the presence on board of explosives and hostile crew.

On 16 January 1993 LTTE radio announced that ten senior LTTE cadres, including Kittu, had committed suicide. Three days of mourning, starting 18 January 1993, were announced.
