= M. E. H. Mohamed Ali =

Sri Lankan politician (1925–2004)

Hon. M. E. H. Mohamed Ali MP
- எம். ஈ. எச். முகம்மது அலி

Member of the Ceylonese Parliament for Mutur
- In office 1952–1960
- Preceded by: A. R. A. M. Abubucker
- Succeeded by: A. L. Abdul Majeed
- In office 1962–1970
- Preceded by: T. Ahambaram
- Succeeded by: A. Thangathurai

Personal details
- Born: 27 March 1925
- Died: 31 December 2004 (aged 79)
- Party: United National Party
- Ethnicity: Sri Lankan Moor

Mohamed Ehuttar Hadjiar Mohamed Ali (27 March 1925 – 31 December 2004) was a Ceylonese politician and Member of Parliament.

== Early life and family ==
Mohamed Ali was born on 27 March 1925 near Kinniya in eastern Ceylon. His brother was M. E. H. Maharoof.

== Career ==
Mohamed Ali was chairman of Kinniya Village Council.

Mohamed Ali stood as the Communist Party candidate in Mutur at the 1947 parliamentary election but was defeated by the United National Party candidate A. R. A. M. Abubucker. He stood as an independent candidate in Mutur at the 1952 parliamentary election. He won the election and entered Parliament. He was re-elected at the 1956 and March 1960 parliamentary elections as an independent candidate. He stood as the United National Party (UNP) candidate in Mutur at the July 1960 parliamentary election but failed to get re-elected.

Mohamed Ali played a leading role in the 1961 satyagraha campaign organised by Illankai Tamil Arasu Kachchi (ITAK). Following the death of ITAK MP T. Ahambaram, Mohamed Ali contested the Mutur by-election on 28 June 1962 as the ITAK candidate and was re-elected to Parliament. He was re-elected at the 1965 parliamentary election. He stood as the UNP candidate in Mutur at the 1970 parliamentary election but failed to get re-elected.

Mohamed Ali later served as Ceylonese ambassador to Maldives, and deputy chairman of the Paddy Marketing Board. He died on 31 December 2004 at his home.
