= Thirunelveli massacre =

1983 Tamil Tiger killing of Sri Lankan soldiers

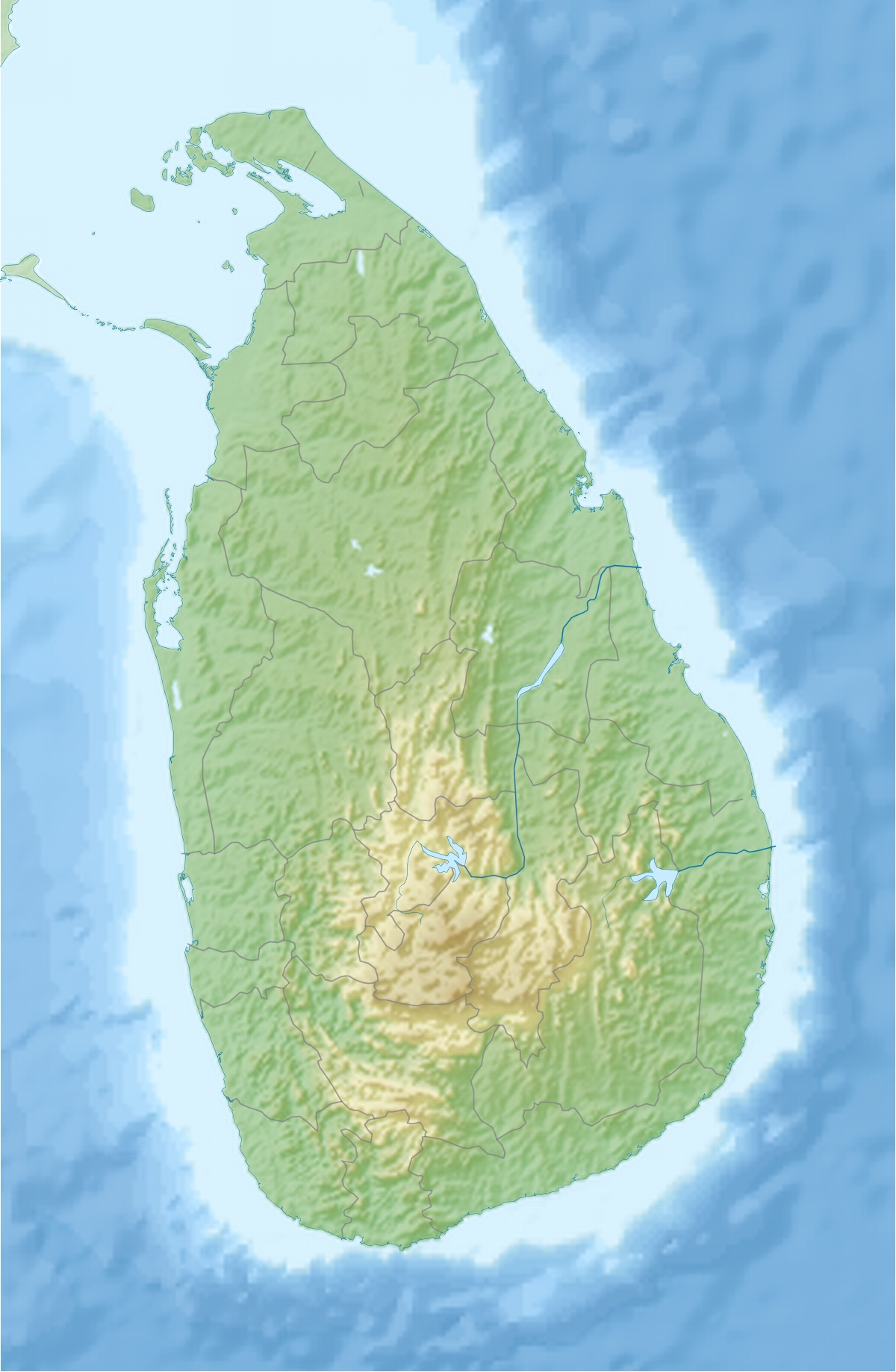
- Location: 9°41′16.82″N 80°1′42.56″E; Thirunelveli, Sri Lanka
- Date: 24 July 1983
- Target: Sri Lankan Tamil civilians
- Deaths: 60+
- Injuries: Over 100 injured
- Perpetrator: Sri Lankan Army

The Thirunelveli massacre happened on July 24, 1983, following the killing of 13 Sri Lanka Army soldiers in an LTTE ambush in Thirunelveli the night before. In response to the ambush, truckloads of Sri Lankan soldiers left the Palaly camp at 4:30 AM, smashing all the shops on the way to Thirunelveli. Over 60 Tamil civilians in Jaffna were subsequently massacred by the rampaging army in revenge.

Civilians were shot dead in buses and at point blank range within their homes. In one massacre, 17 Tamil teenagers were paraded out of a bus before being shot dead. Among those shot dead included children going to early morning tuition class, A. Vimalathasan, a working member of MIRJE (the Movement for Inter-Racial Justice and Equality), a 10 year old cyclist, and a journalist and newspaper editor.

An elderly couple were also shot dead in their house before it was burnt down. Over 100 Tamil civilians were also injured and over 100 homes and shops were damaged or burnt. A day after the ambush, 27 dead bodies of local Tamils had been brought to the morgue of the Jaffna Hospital.

Whereas the prior killing of soldiers was reported instantly in the local Sri Lankan media, this subsequent massacre of civilians was suppressed from the media and not reported. It remained unknown to the Sinhalese public.

== See also ==
- List of attacks on civilians attributed to Sri Lankan government forces
- Black July
