= T. Sivasithamparam =

Sri Lankan Tamil politician and Member of Parliament

Hon. T. Sivasithamparam
- தா. சிவசிதம்பரம்
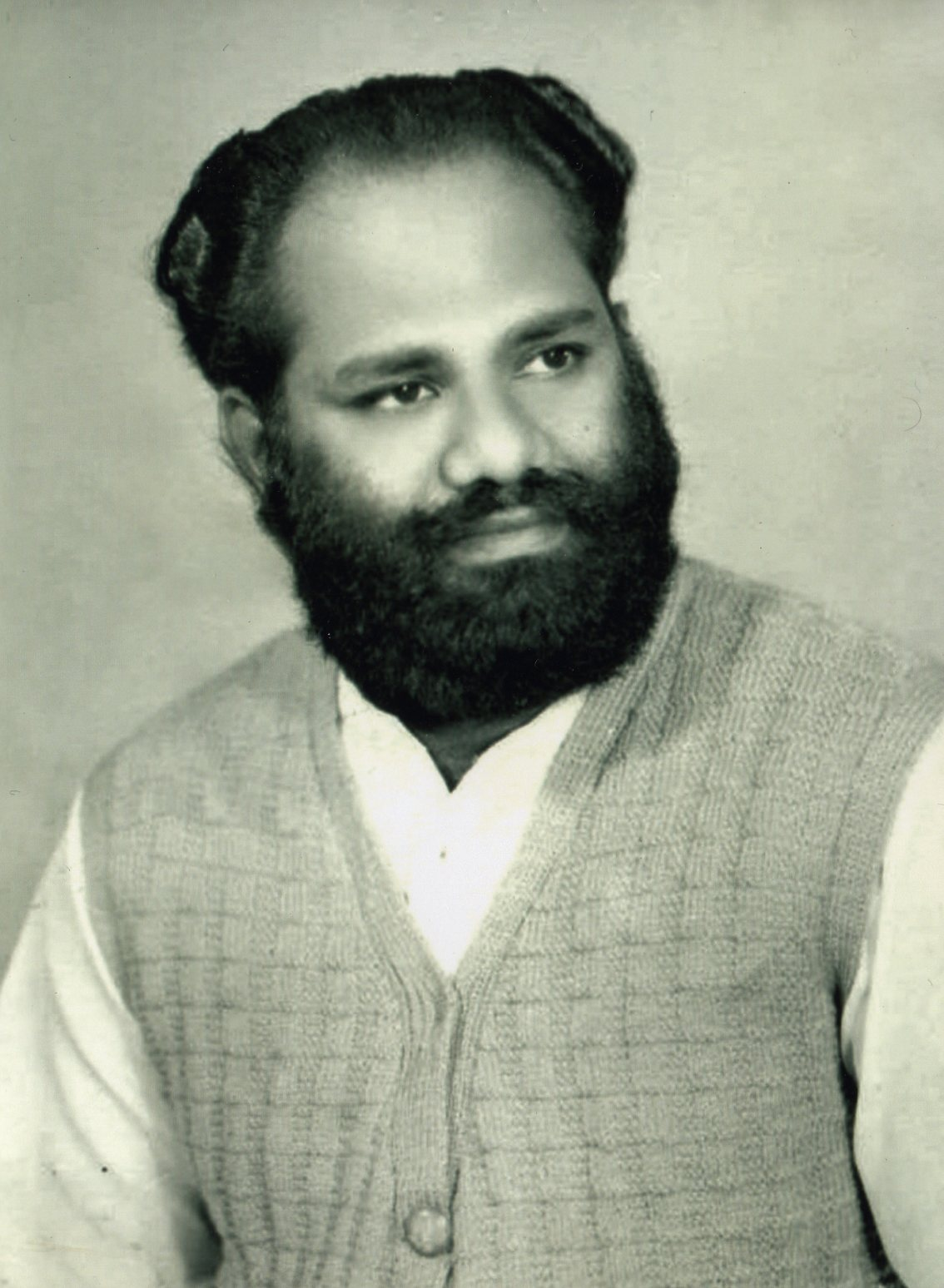

Member of the Ceylonese Parliament for Vavuniya
- In office 1960–1970
- Preceded by: C. Suntharalingam
- Succeeded by: X. M. Sellathambu
- In office 1977–1983
- Preceded by: X. M. Sellathambu

Personal details
- Born: 26 March 1926
- Died: 9 November 1992 (aged 66) Canada
- Party: All Ceylon Tamil Congress
- Other political affiliations: Tamil United Liberation Front
- Education: Trincomalee Hindu College
- Ethnicity: Sri Lankan Tamil

Thamotharampillai Sivasithamparam (Tamil: தாமோதரம்பிள்ளை சிவசிதம்பரம்; 26 March 1926 – 9 November 1992) was a Sri Lankan Tamil politician and Member of Parliament.

== Early life and family ==
Sivasithamparam was born on 26 March 1926. He was the son of Thamotharampillai, a village headman from Mullaitivu in northern Ceylon. He was educated at Trincomalee Hindu College.

Sivasithamparam married Nagambi. They had three sons (Sugumaran, Srikanthan and Sivakumar) and two daughters (Vanetha and Kanchana).

== Career ==
Sivasithamparam was a Village Cultivation Officer (VCO).

Sivasithamparam stood as an independent candidate in Vavuniya at the March 1960 parliamentary election. He won the election and entered Parliament. He was re-elected at the July 1960 parliamentary election. He later joined the All Ceylon Tamil Congress (ACTC), serving as its youth leader. He contested the 1965 parliamentary election as the ACTC candidate and was re-elected. He was however defeated by the Illankai Tamil Arasu Kachchi (ITAK) candidate X. M. Sellathambu at the 1970 parliamentary election.

On 14 May 1972 the ACTC, ITAK, Ceylon Workers' Congress, Eelath Thamilar Otrumai Munnani and All Ceylon Tamil Conference formed the Tamil United Front, later renamed Tamil United Liberation Front (TULF). Sivasithamparam was the TULF's candidate in Vavuniya at the 1977 parliamentary election and was re-elected. Sivasithamparam and all other TULF MPs boycotted Parliament from the middle of 1983 for a number of reasons: they were under pressure from Sri Lankan Tamil militants not to stay in Parliament beyond their normal six-year term; the Sixth Amendment to the Constitution of Sri Lanka required them to swear an oath unconditionally renouncing support for a separate state; and the Black July riots in which up to 3,000 Tamils were murdered by Sinhalese mobs. After three months of absence, Sivasithamparam forfeited his seat in Parliament on 5 October 1983.

On 30 September 1983 the Sri Lankan Army attacked Sivasithamparam's Madukulam farm, beating to death the farm manager Nadarajah and burning his body. Fearing for his life, Sivasithamparam fled to India. He later migrated to Canada where he died on 9 November 1992.
