= Mutur Electoral District =

Electoral district of Sri Lanka

Coordinates: 8.4539°N 81.2656°E

Mutur Electoral District was an electoral district of Sri Lanka between August 1947 and February 1989. The district was named after the town of Mutur in Trincomalee District, Eastern Province. The district was a two-member constituency between March 1960 and July 1977. The 1978 Constitution of Sri Lanka introduced the proportional representation electoral system for electing members of Parliament. The existing 160 mainly single-member electoral districts were replaced with 22 multi-member electoral districts. Mutur electoral district was replaced by the Trincomalee multi-member electoral district at the 1989 general elections, the first under the PR system, though Mutur continues to be a polling division of the multi-member electoral district.

== Members of Parliament ==
Key

Independent ITAK SLFP UNP

Election	Member	Party	Term
1947	A. R. A. M. Abubucker	United National Party	1947-1952
1952	M. E. H. Mohamed Ali	Independent	1952-1960
1956	M. E. H. Mohamed Ali	Independent	1952-1960
1960 (March)	T. Ahambaram	Illankai Tamil Arasu Kachchi	1960-1962
1960 (July)	T. Ahambaram	Illankai Tamil Arasu Kachchi	1960-1962
1962 (June)	M. E. H. Mohamed Ali	Illankai Tamil Arasu Kachchi	1962-1970
1965	M. E. H. Mohamed Ali	Illankai Tamil Arasu Kachchi	1962-1970
1970	A. L. Abdul Majeed	Sri Lanka Freedom Party	1970-1977
1977	M. E. H. Maharoof	United National Party	1977-1989

== 1947 Parliamentary General Election ==
Results of the 1st parliamentary election held between 23 August 1947 and 20 September 1947:

Candidate	Party	Symbol	Votes	%
A. R. A. M. Abubucker	United National Party	Elephant	3,480	43.98%
M. E. H. Mohamed Ali	Communist Party	Pair of Scales	1,760	22.24%
E. Sokkalingam		Star	1,555	19.65%
A. C. Chellarajah		Umbrella	1,118	14.13%
Valid Votes			7,913	100.00%
Rejected Votes			228	
Total Polled			8,141	
Registered Electors			16,649	
Turnout			48.90%	

== 1952 Parliamentary General Election ==
Results of the 2nd parliamentary election held between 24 May 1952 and 30 May 1952:

Candidate	Party	Symbol	Votes	%
M. E. H. Mohamed Ali	Independent	Pair of Scales	6,050	64.51%
A. R. A. M. Abubucker	United National Party	Umbrella	3,329	35.49%
Valid Votes			9,379	100.00%
Rejected Votes			119	
Total Polled			9,498	
Registered Electors			16,705	
Turnout			56.86%	

== 1956 Parliamentary General Election ==
Results of the 3rd parliamentary election held between 5 April 1956 and 10 April 1956:

Candidate	Party	Symbol	Votes	%
M. E. H. Mohamed Ali	Independent	Pair of Scales	10,549	84.72%
A. H. Alwis		Aeroplane	1,902	15.28%
Valid Votes			12,451	100.00%
Rejected Votes			114	
Total Polled			12,565	
Registered Electors			22,177	
Turnout			56.66%	

== 1960 (March) Parliamentary General Election ==
Results of the 4th parliamentary election held on 19 March 1960:

Candidate	Party	Symbol	Votes	%
T. Ahambaram	Illankai Tamil Arasu Kachchi	House	10,685	26.73%
M. E. H. Mohamed Ali	Independent	Ladder	10,680	26.72%
A. L. Abdul Majeed		Sewing Machine	7,540	18.86%
S. B. Weerakoon	Sri Lanka Freedom Party	Hand	6,748	16.88%
A. H. Alwis	United National Party	Elephant	1,488	3.72%
P. D. E. Victor Perera	Mahajana Eksath Peramuna	Cart Wheel	1,165	2.91%
J. A. P. Thurainayagam	Independent	Sun	1,075	2.69%
A. R. A. M. Abubucker	Lanka Democratic Party	Umbrella	298	0.75%
N. T. Francis Xavier		Cockerel	295	0.74%
Valid Votes			39,974	100.00%
Rejected Votes			1,153	
Total Polled			41,127	
Registered Electors			28,520	
Turnout			144.20%	

== 1960 (July) Parliamentary General Election ==
Results of the 5th parliamentary election held on 20 July 1960:

Candidate	Party	Symbol	Votes	%
T. Ahambaram	Illankai Tamil Arasu Kachchi	House	13,304	28.88%
A. L. Abdul Majeed	Sri Lanka Freedom Party	Hand	13,247	28.76%
M. E. H. Mohamed Ali	United National Party	Elephant	11,417	24.78%
H. D. L. Leelaratne		Ladder	7,916	17.18%
P. D. E. Victor Perera	Mahajana Eksath Peramuna	Cart Wheel	181	0.39%
Valid Votes			46,065	100.00%
Rejected Votes			677	
Total Polled			46,742	
Registered Electors			28,520	
Turnout			163.89%	

=== 1962 Parliamentary by-election ===
Results of the by-election held on 28 June 1962:

Candidate	Party	Symbol	Votes	%
M. E. H. Mohamed Ali	Illankai Tamil Arasu Kachchi	House	14,215	51.31%
S. A. Hameed	Sri Lanka Freedom Party	Hand	6,903	24.92%
R. M. Gunathilake		Star	6,040	21.80%
C. Sundaralingam	Eelam Front	Sun	423	1.52%
Valid Votes			27,699	100.00%
Rejected Votes			118	
Total Polled			27,699	
Registered Electors			34.632	
Turnout			79.98%	

== 1965 Parliamentary General Election ==
Results of the 6th parliamentary election held on 22 March 1965:

Candidate	Party	Symbol	Votes	%
M. E. H. Mohamed Ali	Illankai Tamil Arasu Kachchi	House	20,237	35.64%
A. L. Abdul Majeed	Sri Lanka Freedom Party	Hand	16,726	29.45%
H. D. L. Leelaratne	United National Party	Elephant	15,328	26.99%
D. V. Paulis	Sri Lanka Freedom Party	Bird	3,792	6.68%
R. M. Gunathilaka		Ladder	376	0.66%
S. S. Arumugam	All Ceylon Tamil Congress	Bicycle	327	0.58%
Valid Votes			56,786	100.00%
Rejected Votes			1,343	
Total Polled			58,129	
Registered Electors			38,516	
Turnout			150.92%	

== 1970 Parliamentary General Election ==
Results of the 7th parliamentary election held on 27 May 1970:

Candidate	Party	Symbol	Votes	%
A. L. Abdul Majeed	Sri Lanka Freedom Party	Hand	22,727	29.72%
A. Thangathurai	Illankai Tamil Arasu Kachchi	House	19,787	25.87%
H. D. L. Leelaratne		Ladder	18,698	24.45%
M. E. H. Mohamed Ali	United National Party	Elephant	15,018	19.64%
B.G. Sirisena		Lamp	253	0.33%
Valid Votes			76,483	100.00%
Rejected Votes			705	
Total Polled			77,188	
Registered Electors			44,176	
Turnout			174.73%	

== 1977 Parliamentary General Election ==
Results of the 8th parliamentary election held on 21 July 1977:

Candidate	Party	Symbol	Votes	%
M. E. H. Maharoof	United National Party	Elephant	12,530	44.99%
A. L. Abdul Majeed	Sri Lanka Freedom Party	Hand	7,800	28.01%
S. M. Makeen	Tamil United Liberation Front (Muslim United Liberation Front)	Sun	7,520	27.00%
Valid Votes			27,850	100.00%
Rejected Votes			115	
Total Polled			27,965	
Registered Electors			30,389	
Turnout			92.02%	
