= X. M. Sellathambu =

Sri Lankan Tamil civil servant, politician and Member of Parliament

Hon. X. M. Sellathambu
- சே. மா. செல்லத்தம்பு

Member of the Ceylonese Parliament for Vavuniya
- In office 1970–1977
- Preceded by: T. Sivasithamparam
- Succeeded by: T. Sivasithamparam

Member of Parliament for Mullaitivu
- In office 1977–1983

Personal details
- Born: 20 October 1917
- Died: 26 March 1984 (aged 66)
- Party: Illankai Tamil Arasu Kachchi
- Other political affiliations: Tamil United Liberation Front
- Occupation: Civil servant

Xavier Mark Sellathambu (Tamil: சேவியர் மார்க் செல்லத்தம்பு; 20 October 1917 – 26 March 1984) was a Sri Lankan Tamil civil servant, politician and Member of Parliament.

== Early life ==
Sellathambu was born on 20 October 1917. He was married to Mary Josephine.

== Career ==
Sellathambu was Divisional Revenue Officer for Mullaitivu.

Sellathambu stood as the Illankai Tamil Arasu Kachchi (Federal Party) candidate in Vavuniya electoral district at the 1970 parliamentary election. He won the election and entered Parliament.

On 14 May 1972 the ITAK, All Ceylon Tamil Congress, Ceylon Workers' Congress, Eelath Thamilar Otrumai Munnani and All Ceylon Tamil Conference formed the Tamil United Front, later renamed Tamil United Liberation Front (TULF).

Sellathambu was the TULF's candidate in Mullaitivu at the 1977 parliamentary election and was re-elected. He was Chief Opposition Whip from 1977 to 1983.

Sellathambu and all other TULF MPs boycotted Parliament from the middle of 1983 for a number of reasons: they were under pressure from Sri Lankan Tamil militants not to stay in Parliament beyond their normal six-year term; the Sixth Amendment to the Constitution of Sri Lanka required them to swear an oath unconditionally renouncing support for a separate state; and the Black July riots in which up to 3,000 Tamils were murdered by Sinhalese mobs. After three months of absence, Sellathambu forfeited his seat in Parliament on 21 October 1983. Sellathambu died in March 1984 at the age of 66.
