= Vavuniya Electoral District =

Electoral district of Sri Lanka

Vavuniya Electoral District was an electoral district of Sri Lanka between August 1947 and February 1989. The district was named after the town of Vavuniya in Vavuniya District, Northern Province. The 1978 Constitution of Sri Lanka introduced the proportional representation electoral system for electing members of Parliament. The existing 160 mainly single-member electoral districts were replaced with 22 multi-member electoral districts. Vavuniya electoral district was replaced by the Vanni multi-member electoral district at the 1989 general elections, the first under the PR system, though Vavuniya continues to be a polling division of the multi-member electoral district.

== Members of Parliament ==
Key

Independent ACTC ITAK TULF

Election	Member	Party	Term
1947	C. Suntharalingam	Independent	1947-1952
1952	C. Suntharalingam	Independent	1952-1956
1956	C. Suntharalingam	Independent	1956-1960
1960 (March)	C. Suntharalingam	Independent	1960-1960
1960 (July)	T. Sivasithamparam	Independent	1960-1965
1965	T. Sivasithamparam	All Ceylon Tamil Congress	1965-1970
1970	X. M. Sellathambu	Illankai Tamil Arasu Kachchi	1970-1977
1977	T. Sivasithamparam	Tamil United Liberation Front	1977-1989

== Elections ==
=== 1947 Parliamentary General Election ===
Results of the 1st parliamentary election held between 23 August 1947 and 20 September 1947:

Candidate	Party	Symbol	Votes	%
C. Suntharalingam	Independent	Tree	4,026	66.61%
T. M. Sabaratnam	All Ceylon Tamil Congress	Spoon	2,018	33.39%
Valid Votes			6,044	100.00%
Rejected Votes			132	
Total Polled			6,176	
Registered Electors			11,099	
Turnout			55.64%	

=== 1952 Parliamentary General Election ===
Results of the 2nd parliamentary election held between 24 May 1952 and 30 May 1952:

Candidate	Party	Symbol	Votes	%
C. Suntharalingam	Independent	Star	6,019	66.83%
U. B. Dassanayake	Independent	Key	1,497	16.62%
T. M. Sabaratnam	All Ceylon Tamil Congress	Umbrella	1,398	15.52%
K. Vellupillai	Independent	Chair	93	1.03%
Valid Votes			9,007	100.00%
Rejected Votes			104	
Total Polled			9,111	
Registered Electors			13,093	
Turnout			69.59%	

=== 1956 Parliamentary General Election ===
Results of the 3rd parliamentary election held between 5 April 1956 and 10 April 1956:

Candidate	Party	Symbol	Votes	%
C. Suntharalingam	Ind (Tamil Resistance Front)	Tree	6,853	78.69%
P. Tharmalingam	Independent	Cart Wheel	1,856	21.31%
Valid Votes			8,709	100.00%
Rejected Votes			69	
Total Polled			8,778	
Registered Electors			15,946	
Turnout			55.05%	

=== 1960 (March) Parliamentary General Election ===
Results of the 4th parliamentary election held on 19 March 1960:

Candidate	Party	Symbol	Votes	%
T. Sivasithamparam	Independent	Sun	5,370	43.28%
C. Suntharalingam	Independent	Ship	4,231	34.10%
P. Muthiah		Orange	1,469	11.84%
S. Subramaniam	Illankai Tamil Arasu Kachchi	House	1,338	10.78%
Valid Votes			12,408	100.00%
Rejected Votes			107	
Total Polled			12,515	
Registered Electors			18,469	
Turnout			67.76%	

=== 1960 (July) Parliamentary General Election ===
Results of the 5th parliamentary election held on 20 July 1960:

Candidate	Party	Symbol	Votes	%
T. Sivasithamparam	Independent	Bicycle	7,393	57.71%
G. B. Vincent	Illankai Tamil Arasu Kachchi	House	5,418	42.29%
Valid Votes			12,811	100.00%
Rejected Votes			56	
Total Polled			12,867	
Registered Electors			18,469	
Turnout			69.67%	

=== 1965 Parliamentary General Election ===
Results of the 6th parliamentary election held on 22 March 1965:

Candidate	Party	Symbol	Votes	%
T. Sivasithamparam	All Ceylon Tamil Congress	Bicycle	7,265	40.33%
G. B. Vincent	Illankai Tamil Arasu Kachchi	House	4,512	25.05%
C. Suntharalingam		Tree	3,952	21.94%
V. Siriwardhana		Chair	872	4.84%
Ariyawansa Goonasekera		Umbrella	744	4.13%
W. S. Perera	Mahajana Eksath Peramuna	Cart Wheel	436	2.42%
S. Sirinivasan	Independent	Pair of Scales	231	1.28%
Valid Votes			18,012	100.00%
Rejected Votes			130	
Total Polled			18,142	
Registered Electors			24,701	
Turnout			73.45%	

=== 1970 Parliamentary General Election ===
Results of the 7th parliamentary election held on 27 May 1970:

Candidate	Party	Symbol	Votes	%
X. M. Sellathambu	Illankai Tamil Arasu Kachchi	House	10,947	42.99%
T. Sivasithamparam	All Ceylon Tamil Congress	Bicycle	10,674	41.92%
S. Pathmanathan	Communist Party	Star	3,120	12.25%
S. M. K. Subasinghe		Pair of Scales	584	2.29%
A. D. A. Seneviratne		Tree	137	0.54%
Valid Votes			25,462	100.00%
Rejected Votes			116	
Total Polled			25,578	
Registered Electors			31,650	
Turnout			80.82%	

=== 1977 Parliamentary General Election ===
Results of the 8th parliamentary election held on 21 July 1977:

Candidate	Party	Symbol	Votes	%
T. Sivasithamparam	Tamil United Liberation Front	Sun	13,821	59.02%
K. T. Pulendran	United National Party	Elephant	9,444	40.33%
Udayarege Subasinghe		Eye	151	0.64%
Valid Votes			23,416	100.00%
Rejected Votes			80	
Total Polled			23,496	
Registered Electors			28,450	
Turnout			82.59%	

T. Sivasithamparam and all other TULF MPs boycotted Parliament from the middle of 1983 for a number of reasons: they were under pressure from Sri Lankan Tamil militants not to stay in Parliament beyond their normal six-year term; the Sixth Amendment to the Constitution of Sri Lanka required them to swear an oath unconditionally renouncing support for a separate state; and the Black July riots in which up to 3,000 Tamils were murdered by Sinhalese mobs. After three months of absence, Sivasithamparam forfeited his seat in Parliament on 5 October 1983.
