= A. Kumarathurai =

Sri Lankan village founder (1939–2019)

Personal details
- Born: May 25, 1939 Killiveddy, Sri Lanka
- Died: January 22, 2019 (aged 79)
- Spouse: Kumarathurai Rajeswary
- Children: 6
- Ethnicity: Sri Lankan Tamil

Kumarathurai Arunasalam (Tamil: அருணாசலம் குமராதுரை; May 25, 1939 - 22 January 2019) was the founder of Kumarapuram, a small village in Trincomalee District of Sri Lanka’s Eastern Province. He is younger brother of late Tamil United Liberation Front (TULF) Member of Parliament for Trincomalee District, A. Thangathurai.

== Publications ==
- இலக்கை அரசியல் வரலாறு - இழப்புகளும் பதிவுகளும், 2012.

== See also ==
- Kumarapuram massacre
