= Mullaitivu Electoral District =

Electoral district of Sri Lanka

Mullaitivu Electoral District was an electoral district of Sri Lanka between July 1977 and February 1989. The district was named after the town of Mullaitivu in Mullaitivu District, Northern Province. The 1978 Constitution of Sri Lanka introduced the proportional representation electoral system for electing members of Parliament. The existing 160 mainly single-member electoral districts were replaced with 22 multi-member electoral districts. Mullaitivu electoral district was replaced by the Vanni multi-member electoral district at the 1989 general elections, the first under the PR system, though Mullaitivu continues to be a polling division of the multi-member electoral district.

== Members of Parliament ==
Key

TULF

Election	Member	Party	Term
1977	X. M. Sellathambu	Tamil United Liberation Front	1977-1989

== Elections ==
=== 1977 Parliamentary General Election ===
Results of the 8th parliamentary election held on 21 July 1977 for the district:

Candidate	Party	Symbol	Votes	%
X. M. Sellathambu	Tamil United Liberation Front	Sun	10,261	52.36%
P. Chandrasekar	Independent	Pair of Scales	7,632	38.95%
R. Vickkinarasa		Ladder	977	4.99%
V. Santhirasenan		Bell	726	3.70%
Valid Votes			19,596	100.00%
Rejected Votes			76	
Total Polled			19,672	
Registered Electors			24,698	
Turnout			79.65%	

X. M. Sellathambu and all other TULF MPs boycotted Parliament from the middle of 1983 for a number of reasons: they were under pressure from Sri Lankan Tamil militants not to stay in Parliament beyond their normal six-year term; the Sixth Amendment to the Constitution of Sri Lanka required them to swear an oath unconditionally renouncing support for a separate state; and the Black July riots in which up to 3,000 Tamils were murdered by Sinhalese mobs. After three months of absence, Sellathambu forfeited his seat in Parliament on 21 October 1983.
