= R. K. M. Sri Koneswara Hindu College =

School in Eastern Province, Sri Lanka

Location
- Dockyard Road; Trincomalee, Trincomalee District, Eastern Province; Sri Lanka; 8°34′27.70″N 81°14′05.20″E

Information
- School type: Public national 1AB
- Founded: 1897
- School district: Trincomalee Education Zone
- Authority: Ministry of Education

Ramakrishna Mission Sri Koneswara Hindu College (also known as Trincomalee Hindu College or Trinco Hindu College) is a national school in Trincomalee, Sri Lanka.

== History ==
The school was founded in 1897 by leading Hindus. It was administered by a Board of Management. It became a government primary school in 1922. The Board of Management handed the school over to the Ramakrishna Mission on 1 June 1925. Swami Vipulananda administered the school on behalf of the mission. The school obtained senior secondary status in 1932. The school was forced to move to temporary premises during World War II, but moved back to its original premises in 1945. The school became a Grade One school in 1952.

Since its foundation, the school had functioned with two separate divisions: Hindu Boys Tamil School and Hindu Boys English School. Later the Hindu Boys English School was renamed R. K. M. Hindu College and whilst the Hindu Boys Tamil School became R. K. M. Sri Koneswara Vidyalayam. Both schools were taken over, as separate schools, by the government in 1961. In 1993 the two schools were merged into R. K. M. Sri Koneswara Hindu College and given national school status.

== Notable alumni ==
- A. L. Abdul Majeed (1933–1987), Sri Lankan politician
- M. E. H. Maharoof (1939–1997), Sri Lankan politician
- Sasi Mahendran, Sri Lankan judge of the Court of Appeal
- Seelan (1960–1983), Sri Lankan rebel and member of the LTTE
- T. Sivasithamparam (1926–1992), Sri Lankan politician
- S. Thandayuthapani (born 1950), Sri Lankan teacher, civil servant and politician

== See also ==
- List of schools in Eastern Province, Sri Lanka
