= T. M. Sabaratnam =

Ceylon Tamil lawyer and politician

Honourable T. M. Sabaratnam MLC
- த. மு. சபாரத்தினம்

Member of the Legislative Council of Ceylon for Northern Province East

Personal details
- Died: 1968
- Party: All Ceylon Tamil Congress
- Education: Ceylon Law College
- Profession: Lawyer
- Ethnicity: Ceylon Tamil

Thambaiyah Mudaliyar Sabaratnam (Tamil: தம்பையா முதலியார் சபாரத்தினம், romanized: Tampaiyā Mutaliyār Capārattiṉam; died 1968) was a Ceylon Tamil lawyer, politician and member of the Legislative Council of Ceylon.

== Early life and family ==
Sabaratnam was born in the late 1880s. He was the son of Mudaliyar Thambaiyah from Mullaitivu in north-eastern Ceylon. He was educated at the Royal College Colombo 7 and St. Patrick's College, Jaffna.

Sabaratnam married to Alagammah Sabaratnam of Palavirukkai Vathiri. They had a son Rajakone Pulendra and daughter Sakuntala Nalliah.

== Career ==
Sabaratnam studied law at Ceylon Law College and became a proctor of the Supreme Court, practising law in Jaffna. He contested the 1924 legislative council election as a candidate for the Northern Province East (Mullaitivu-Vavuniya-Vadamarachchi) seat and was elected to the Legislative Council of Ceylon unopposed.

Sabaratnam stood as the All Ceylon Tamil Congress (ACTC) candidate for Vavuniya at the 1947 parliamentary election but was defeated by independent candidate C. Suntharalingam. He was defeated by Suntharalingam at the 1956 parliamentary election as well.

Sabaratnam was a member of the Board of Management of the Ramakrishna Mission Ceylonese branch. He died in 1970.

== Electoral history ==
Electoral history of T. M. Sabaratnam
Election	Constituency	Party	Votes	Result
1924 legislative council	Northern Province East		-	Elected
1947 parliamentary	Vavuniya	ACTC	2,018	Not elected
1952 parliamentary	Vavuniya	ACTC	1,398	Not elected
