= Four Four Bravo ambush =

Call sign of a Sri Lankan Army patrol, ambushed by Tamil separatists in 1983

- Part of Eelam War I
| Date | 23 July 1983 |
| Location | Thirunelveli, Jaffna Peninsula |
| Result | Successful LTTE ambush: Thirunelveli massacre; Beginning of Black July and Sri Lankan Civil War |

Belligerents
| Liberation Tigers of Tamil Eelam | Sri Lanka Army: Sri Lanka Light Infantry |

Commanders and leaders
| Velupillai Prabhakaran; Lt. Sellakili † | (Sri Lanka) Brig J. G. Balthazar, (Sri Lanka) 2nd Lt Vaas Gunawardene † |

Strength
| 25 | 15 |

Casualties and losses
| 1 (Lt. Sellakili) | 1 officer & 12 soldiers died, 2 injured |

Four Four Bravo was the call sign of a fifteen-man Sri Lankan Army patrol, deployed in the Jaffna Peninsula on 23 July 1983. The patrol was ambushed and thirteen of its members were killed by the LTTE. This incident sparked the Thirunelveli massacre and the Black July riots and is considered to be the start of the Sri Lankan Civil War.

== Background ==
By July 1983 tension was rising in the Jaffna Peninsula and throughout the country. The TULF had decided that their Members of Parliament would resign their seats and on 21 July 1983, V.N. Navaratnam delivered an emotional farewell address in Parliament. 23 July was a quiet day in Jaffna, even though there were political activity in Mannar. That day at the Army Camp at Gurunagar under the command of Brigadier J. G. Balthazar, the army was preparing an ambush for a LTTE leader Sellakili, who had been engaged in militant activities. It was to be carried out by a group of commandos with the call sign Four Four Charlie, at Kondavil.

Patrol Four Four Bravo was scheduled to leave Gurunagar (code name Four Four) at 22:00 as a routine patrol from the C Company of the First Battalion of the Sri Lanka Light Infantry based at Madagal about 20 miles away. The patrol arrived at 21:47. It consisted of a detachment of 15 soldiers led by Second Lieutenant A.P.N.C. De S. Vaas Gunawardene. The instructions of the Brigadier were that the patrol should be back in Madagal before 23:59, if necessary shortening the prescribed route: Gurunagar – Jaffna – Naga Vihara – Nallur – Kopay – Urumpirai – Kondavil – Kokuvil – Jaffna – Kaliyan – Kadu – Madagal. 2nd Lt. Gunawardene received the instructions from Major De Silva who further emphasized that the patrol must be in Madagal Camp by midnight. Four Four Bravo left Gurunagar at 22:06 and was in radio contact every five minutes. All reports indicated that Jaffna was quiet.

== Ambush ==
During this time Sellakili was planning on getting revenge for the death of Charles Lucas Anthony aka Seelan, the most wanted Tamil militant after LTTE top leader Velupillai Prabhakaran, and had observed the army patrols. That night a group of 25 LTTE men, including Prabhakaran, Colonel Kittu, Iyer, Lt. Col. Victor, Lt. Col. Pulendran, Lt. Shellakili Ammaan, Lt. Col. Santhosam, basheer kaka and Lt. Col. Appaiah gathered at Thirunelveli on the Palali–Jaffna road at a point where the road was dug up to install new telecommunication equipment. Near one such excavation four mines were placed and a plunger stolen from the Kankesanturai Cement Factory was placed on the balcony of a nearby house. Machine gun nests were placed near the exploder and across the road. The force was split in two and placed on both sides of the road with Lt. Sellakili present.

At 23:28 the patrol reported that it was leaving Urumpirai junction and everything was quiet. The patrol was made up of a jeep with 2nd Lt. Vaas Gunawardene, Private N.A.S. Manutange driving and Corporal G.D. Perera and Private S.S. Amarasinghe, Private S.P.G. Rajatillake and Private K.P. Karunaratne in the rear and a Tata Benz half truck with the rest of the patrol with Sergent S.I. Thelakaratne in the front seat with Corporal G.R. Perera at the wheel and Private A.J.R. Fernando between them. Five minutes of leaving Urumpirai the Jeep was slowing down near Tinneveli because of the obstruction on the road due to the installation of telecommunication equipment. As it was passing the excavation on the road, the exploder set off the mines, followed by a hail of machine gun fire on the Jeep and the half-truck. The explosion of the mines wounded many of the men in the jeep including 2nd Lt. Vaas Gunawardene who leapt out of the Jeep and pulled out a hand grenade, but was mowed down by machine gun fire. The rest in the jeep scrambled out attacked the enemy with hand grenades before being killed. Cpl. G.D. Perera charged at the enemy firing his L1A1, his body was found a short distance from the jeep.

On witnessing the explosion the half truck stopped and it too came under fire from both parties of the LTTE. The fire killed Cpl. Perera in the driver's seat, Private Robert, Sunil and Wijesiri in the rear and wounded Private Manapitiya. Sgt. Thelakaratne and Private Fernando who were both wounded scrambled out, took cover from the vehicle and opened fire, however Fernando was soon killed. Thelakaratne kept firing until a home-made grenade blew off one hand and all but blew off one foot. Cpl. R. A. U. Perera and Cpl. Sumathipala kept on firing and the latter in addition lobbed his grenade. In his dying moments Private Manapitiya gave his grenade to the Cpl. Sumathipala who changed their magazines and kept on the pressure on the enemy. At one stage they alighted from the vehicle and kept on firing at the enemy in two different directions thus pinning them down. At 23:40 a message was sent to Brigadier Balthazar that radio contact with the patrol was lost and that a sentry had heard gunfire and explosions in the distance. The Army camps in Palali, Madagal, Thondamanar and Velvettiturai were alerted and the ambush prepared for Four Four Charlie was canceled by the Brigadier. It was sent in search of Four Four Bravo.

Four Four Charlie located the destroyed vehicles at 00:09 and reported in. Cpl. R. A. U. Perera also telephoned from the Kondavil CTB Depot about that time. He had fired till he ran out ammunition and thereafter had retreated, wounded in both legs. He gave the location of Cpl. Sumathipala, who had also fired till his ammunition was almost expended, and thereafter had retreated and was lying wounded. Brigadier Balthazar himself reached the location along with Major Sarath Munasinghe his intelligence officer, and found Sgt. Thelakaratne in critical condition and sent him to the hospital. He died on the way.

== Patrol members ==
KIA = Killed in action

WIA = Wounded In Action

- Second Lieutenant A.P.N.C. De S. Vaas Gunawardene – Patrol Commander – KIA
- Sergeant S.I. Thelakaratne – Patrol Second-in-Command – KIA
- Corporal G.R. Perera – KIA
- Corporal R.A.U. Perera – WIA
- Lance Corporal Sumathipala – WIA
- Lance Corporal G.D. Perera – KIA
- Private A.J.R. Fernando – KIA
- Private M.B. Sunil – KIA
- Private D.N.A.D. Manapitiya – KIA
- Private G. Robert – KIA
- Private A.J. Wijesiri – KIA
- Private N.A.S. Manutange – KIA
- Private S.S. Amarasinghe – KIA
- Private S.P.G. Rajatillake – KIA
- Private K.P. Karunaratne – KIA

== Equipment ==
The members of the Four Four Bravo were armed with SLR rifles, except 2nd Lt. Gunawardene who was armed with a Sterling submachine gun and Grenades. The LTTE used sterling submachine guns, Single shot break action Shotguns stolen from the Chavakachcheri Police Station. They had with them T56 assault rifle and a SLR rifle.
