= A. R. A. M. Abubucker =

Sri Lankan politician

Hon. A. R. A. M. Abubucker
- ஏ. ஆர். ஏ. எம். அபூபக்கர்

Member of Parliament for Mutur
- In office 1947–1952
- Succeeded by: M. E. H. Mohammed Ali

Personal details
- Born: 31 March 1912
- Ethnicity: Sri Lankan Moor

Abdul Razak Alim Mohamed Abubucker (born 31 March 1912, date of death unknown) was a Ceylonese politician and Member of Parliament.

Abubucker stood as the United National Party candidate in Mutur at the 1947 parliamentary election. He won the election and entered Parliament. He was defeated by independent M. E. H. Mohammed Ali at the 1952 parliamentary election. He tried to re-enter Parliament at the March 1960 parliamentary election as a Lanka Democratic Party candidate but was again defeated.
