= A. L. Abdul Majeed =

Sri Lankan politician and Member of Parliament

Hon. A. L. Abdul Majeed
- ஏ. எல். அப்துல் மஜீத்

Member of the Ceylonese Parliament for Mutur
- In office 1960–1977

Personal details
- Born: 15 November 1933
- Died: 13 November 1987 (aged 53)
- Party: Sri Lanka Freedom Party
- Education: Presidency College, Madras
- Ethnicity: Sri Lankan Moor

Abdul Latiff Abdul Majeed (15 November 1933 – 13 November 1987) was a Sri Lankan politician and Member of Parliament.

== Early life ==
Abdul Majeed was born on 15 November 1933. He was educated at Sivananda Vidyalayam, Batticaloa and Trincomalee Hindu College. He later studied at Wadia College, Bombay and Presidency College, Madras.

Abdul Majeed's son Mohamed Najeeb is a provincial councillor and Member of Parliament and former Chief Minister of Eastern Province.

== Political career ==
Abdul Majeed stood as a candidate in Mutur at the March 1960 parliamentary election but failed to get elected. He stood as the Sri Lanka Freedom Party (SLFP) candidate in Mutur at the July 1960 parliamentary election. He won the election and entered Parliament. He was appointed Parliamentary Secretary to the Minister of Public Works in 1964.

Abdul Majeed was re-elected at the 1965 and 1970 parliamentary elections. He served as Deputy Minister of Information and Broadcasting from 1970 to 1977.

The 1976 Delimitation Commission created Seruvila Electoral District from parts of Mutur Electoral District. Mutur was demoted from a two-member district to a single-member district. Abdul Majeed lost his seat at the 1977 parliamentary election.

Abdul Majeed was assassinated on 13 November 1987. The militant Liberation Tigers of Tamil Eelam was widely blamed for the assassination.
