= M. E. H. Maharoof =

Sri Lankan politician (1939–1997)

Hon. M. E. H. Maharoof MP
- எம். ஈ. எச். மகரூப்

Member of Parliament for Mutur
- In office 1977–1989

Member of Parliament for Trincomalee District
- In office 1989–1997

Personal details
- Born: 5 January 1939
- Died: 20 July 1997 (aged 58)
- Party: United National Party

Mohamed Ehuttar Hadjiar Maharoof (Tamil: முகம்மது எகுத்தார் ஹாஜியார் மகரூப்; 5 January 1939 – 20 July 1997) was a Sri Lankan politician and Member of Parliament.

== Early life and family ==
Maharoof was born on 5 January 1939. His father was chairman of Kinniya Village Council and his brother was M. E. H. Mohamed Ali. He was educated at Zahira College, Matale, Trincomalee Hindu College, St. Anthony's College, Kandy and Pembroke Academy, Colombo.

Maharoof's son Imran is a provincial councillor and Member of Parliament.

== Career ==
Maharoof gave up his studies and entered politics in 1965 following the unexpected death of his father. He was chairman of Kinniya Town Council from 1966 to 1971.

Maharoof stood as the United National Party (UNP) candidate in Mutur at the 1977 parliamentary election. He won the election and entered Parliament. He was appointed District Minister for Mannar in 1978. Maharoof contested the 1989 parliamentary election as one of the UNP's candidates in Trincomalee District. He was elected and re-entered Parliament. He was appointed Minister of State for Ports and Shipping in 1990. He was re-elected at the 1994 parliamentary election.

Maharoof had good relationship with Tamils in Trincomalee District and had opposed the establishment of the Sri Lanka Muslim Congress and a South Eastern Provincial Council for the Muslims.

== Death ==
On the morning of 20 July 1997 Maharoof was travelling to Irakakkandy along the Kuchchaveli Road when his jeep was ambushed by gunmen at the 6th Mile Post between Trincomalee and Nilaveli. Maharoof and five others (the driver, a bodyguard, a colleague, a school principal and the driver's four-year-old son) were killed. The militant Liberation Tigers of Tamil Eelam was widely blamed for the assassination.
