= Kumarapuram massacre =

Massacre of Tamil civilians

- The ruined village houses of the settlement of Kumarapuram. The location of the massacre of civilians
- Location: Kumarapuram, Trincomalee district, Sri Lanka
- Date: February 11, 1996 (+6 GMT)
- Target: Sri Lankan Tamil civilians
- Attack type: Firing, Rape
- Weapon: Guns
- Deaths: 26
- Injuries: 28

Kumarapuram massacre (also known as 1996 Trincomalee massacre or 1996 Killiveddy massacre) refers to the mass murder of 26 Sri Lankan Tamil civilians by the Sri Lankan Army soldiers on 11 February 1996. The victims included 13 women and 9 children below the age of 12. Further 28 civilians were severely injured as well. The event took place in a village called Kumarapuram, located in the eastern district of Trincomalee. It was a notable mass murder of civilians since the resumption of armed conflict between rebel forces and Sri Lankan armed forces since April 1995 during the Sri Lankan civil war. The then-government arrested a number of soldiers and home guards who allegedly carried out the massacre. A court case was started on 2004. On 27 July 2016, the court acquitted six former Army Corporals who were accused of the massacre after they were found not guilty.

== Background information ==
After the 1983 anti-Tamil pogrom, full scale civil war erupted between the Sri Lankan government and Tamil rebel groups. During the course of the civil war there were number of massacres of civilians and other human rights abuses attributed to both the government and its allied groups, as well as the various rebel groups.

The area around Kumarapuram had become target of increasing harassment from the Sri Lankan military, with the civilians being subjected to forced labor and verbal and physical abuse. In the days leading up to the massacre, villagers heard soldiers firing guns in the air and issuing threats, often in an intoxicated state. Due to the forced labor, Kumarapuram villagers had come to know many of the soldiers from the nearby camps and check points by their names.

== Massacre ==
The massacre took place in the village called Kumarapuram located in the Trincomalee district on February 11, 1996. According to several survivors interviewed by Amnesty International, 26 civilians, including 13 women and seven children below the age of 12, were killed by soldiers from the 58th mile post and Dehiwatte army camps, accompanied by Home Guards from Dehiwatte. Home guards were local civilians drafted as paramilitary by the government of Sri Lanka.

The killings were in apparent reprisal for the killings by the rebel Liberation Tigers of Tamil Eelam (LTTE) of two soldiers near a location called the 58th mile post on February 11, 1996 about half an hour earlier. According to one witness, a group of soldiers, some of whom were drunk, gathered at Dehiwatte junction and then proceeded towards Kumarapuram, shouting "death to the Tamils". The villagers of Kumarapuram had taken refuge inside their houses. The soldiers broke open the shutters and aimed their guns at the people hiding inside. One woman recounted how she pleaded with them not to shoot but to no avail. In her house, seven people were killed, including a six-year-old child.

Among the villagers who survived the massacre were 28 individuals who were severely injured and they stated that the soldiers had attacked them with axes. Children as young as 3 and 6 years of age had axe injuries on their face. Arasaratham Nagarasa, one of the survivors of the massacre, later recounted the incidents that took place after he had taken refuge in his house with 18 other villagers:

We continued to hear gun-shots pelting down like rain, and so we were all terrified to step outside. Through a crack in the wall we saw four army personnel come towards our house. When they got to our house, they shouted from outside "para demalu [a Sinhala pejorative for Tamils implying 'inferior alien'], eliyata wareng!" (Tamils, get out here now!) [...] A bullet went through my left eye and out the right. My neighbours tried to take me to the nearby dispensary, but, while going, we heard shooting again, so we ran into another nearby house. There I heard that my wife and son had been shot, but, as I was in and out of consciousness at the time, I didn’t fully understand what they were telling me.

Chokkalingam Stephen, a 51-year-old villager whose daughter was killed in the massacre, stated that on the following morning the local soldiers had told him, "two of our boys were killed, so we too went killing". According to many local observers and other reliable testimonies from several sources, a senior army officer had instigated the massacre, who allegedly ordered, "turn the place into powder".

=== Rapes and murder ===
Among the victims was 15-year old Arumathurai Thanaluxmi. She was dragged from a boutique in the village and taken to the milk collection centre where she was gang-raped by the soldiers before being shot dead. Anthony Joseph, a 10-year-old boy, who tried to stop the soldiers from dragging her away, was shot between his legs. There were reports of one more rape and murder as well. In total two girls were raped and murdered as part of the massacre.

== Investigation and trial ==
In March 1996, the Muttur Magistrate Court called on the witnesses from Kumarapuram to identify the perpetrators and 24 witnesses were able to identify 8 soldiers from the 58th Mile Post and Dehiwatta army camps and the Killiveddy check point from a group of 95 soldiers in the three-day long identification parade of over 500 soldiers. The accused were arrested and were promptly released. On 4 November 1998, the Muttur Magistrate committed the case for the Trincomalee High Court, with 120 charges listed against each of eight soldiers. On 3 June 2002, after nearly four years of taking no action to indict the accused, the Attorney General’s department indicted the six accused soldiers on 101 charges each: Corporals SG Nishantha, NM Ajith Sisira Kumara, MP Kapila Darshana, HM Abeysinghe, PP Upasena and HM Abeyratne. Two of the eight accused had died while out on bail. The Attorney General’s department didn't indict any commanding officer in the area who had allegedly directed the massacre, indicating a lack of will to prosecute higher-ranked military personnel.

On 14 June 2005, when the case was taken up for inquiry, the State Counsel Mr. S. Halimdeen told the Trincomalee High Court Judge Mr. Anton Balasingham that all material evidence, including weapons used in the massacre, had been destroyed in 2004 when the office of the Government Analyst in Colombo was gutted by fire. Survivors and witnesses were also subjected to continuous intimidation and harassment from local military personnel, such as when the villagers tried to commemorate the massacre in 2006. After being repeatedly postponed for four years, in October 2006 the Court of Appeal ordered the case to be transferred from the Trincomalee High Court to the Sinhalese-dominated Anuradhapura High Court at the request of the accused (apparently to avoid a Tamil judge in Trincomalee), without giving an opportunity for the counsel of victims to object.

After being dragged on for 20 years, the jury trial began on 27 June 2016. 120 witnesses were notified and 40 of them gave evidence. On 27 July 2016, an all-Sinhalese jury of the Anuradhapura High Court acquitted the six accused former soldiers of all 606 charges against them. Following the acquittal, the victims' families appealed to the President to direct the Attorney General to appeal against the judgement and re-try the accused. In the appeal submitted to the Court of Appeal against the Anuradhapura High Court's decision, the Attorney General stated:

While the plaintiff has proved beyond reasonable doubt that the Defendants were guilty of the accusations against them, the Anuradhapura High Court Jury verdict, exonerating them of all wrongdoing and releasing them, is complete injustice to the victims.

== Notes ==
According to University Teachers for Human Rights (UTHR), there was another notable massacre in the same vicinity in 1985 and it is known as the Killiveddy massacre. Sometimes the Kumamarapuram massacre of 1996 is also referred to as Killiveddy massacre.

== See also ==
- List of attacks on civilians attributed to Sri Lankan government forces
