= Seelan =

Sri Lankan Tamil militant

Lieutenant Seelan
- சீலன்
- Born: Charles Lucas Anthony; 11 December 1960
- Died: 15 July 1983 (aged 22); Meesalai, Sri Lanka
- Years active: –1983
- Organization: Liberation Tigers of Tamil Eelam

Charles Lucas Anthony (Tamil: சாள்ஸ் லூக்காஸ் அன்ரனி; 11 December 1960 – 15 July 1983), commonly known by the nom de guerre Seelan, was a Sri Lankan Tamil rebel and leading member of the Liberation Tigers of Tamil Eelam (LTTE), a separatist Tamil militant organisation in Sri Lanka.

== Early life and family ==
Anthony was born on 11 December 1960. He was from Trincomalee in eastern Ceylon and a Roman Catholic. He was educated at Sri Koneswara Hindu College in Trincomalee. He is said to have participated in the burning of the Sri Lankan flag when it was hoisted at the school on republic day in 1972.

== LTTE ==
Anthony was one of the founding members of the militant Liberation Tigers of Tamil Eelam (LTTE). He took on the nom de guerre "Seelan". Seelan was a close friend and confidante of LTTE leader V. Prabhakaran. Whilst Prabhakaran was in India, Seelan, together with Mahattaya and Ragu, were in charge of the LTTE in Sri Lanka. Later Seelan served as military chief of the LTTE. Seelan is credited with transforming the LTTE into the leading Tamil militant group.

The first attack on the army by Tamil militants took place on 15 October 1981 when the LTTE ambushed an army jeep on the KKS Road in Jaffna and Seelan shot dead two soldiers (H. G. W. Hewawasam and H. M. P. Thisera). Seelan is also believed to have been responsible for the shooting to death of Sivashanmugamoorthy (alias Sundaram), deputy leader of People's Liberation Organisation of Tamil Eelam and editor of the Puthiya Pathai (New Way) magazine, at the Chitra Press in Jaffna on 2 January 1982.

On 27 October 1982 Seelan led a group of LTTE cadres (Aruna, Bashir Kaka, Mahattaya, Pulendran, Raghu, Santhosam and Shankar) and attacked the police station in Chavakachcheri, killing three police officers (Kandiah, Karunanandan and Tilakaratne) and stealing a large amount of arms and ammunition. Seelan was seriously wounded after being shot in the knee. He was driven to the house of University of Jaffna lecturer M. Niththyanandan and his wife Nirmala in Jaffna for medical treatment. He was then moved to Tamil Nadu for further medical treatment and didn't return to Sri Lanka until February 1983. Niththyanandan and Nirmala were arrested on 18 November 1982.

On 6 July 1983 a group of LTTE cadres, including Seelan and Sellakili (Sathasivam Chelvanayakam), stole five exploders from Kankesanthurai Cement Factory. Brigadier J. G. Balthazar, the commander of the Sri Lankan security forces in the north, received a tip-off from a police officer on 15 July 1983 that Seelan, the most wanted Tamil militant after Prabhakaran, was operating from a house in a coconut grove at Meesalai near Chavakachcheri. As the army arrived at the house that evening, Seelan and three other LTTE cadres (Anand, Aruna and Ganesh) fled on bicycles. As the soldiers pursued the LTTE cadres and opened fire, Seelan, who was handicapped by the injuries sustained at Chavakachcheri police station, abandoned his bicycle and ran through a paddy field. The soldiers continued the pursuit and kept firing, killing Anand and injuring Seelan in the knee. As Aruna went to help Seelan, who was struggling to keep up, Seelan asked Aruna to shoot him and escape. Aruna protested but Seelan ordered him to shoot. Aruna placed the barrel of his rifle on Seelan's forehead and shot him dead before escaping in a hijacked car.

The LTTE ambush of the Four Four Bravo military patrol on 23 July 1983 which killed 15 soldiers and several LTTE members is believed to have been revenge for Seelan's death.

The Charles Anthony Brigade was named after Seelan. Prabhakaran's eldest son Charles Anthony was also named after Seelan. A memorial to Seelan and a children's park named after Seelan were built at Meesalai-Allarai. After the Sri Lankan military re-captured the Thenmarachchi region in 1995 they destroyed the memorial and children's park. The memorial was re-built in 2003 during the Norwegian mediated Cease Fire Agreement.
