= Mabel Rayner =

English botanist

- Born: Mabel Mary Cheveley Rayner
- Died: 1948
- Other name: Mabel Jones
- Spouse: William Neilson Jones
- Scientific career
- Fields: Botany; Mycology
- Workplaces: University College, Reading; Forestry Commission

Mabel Mary Cheveley Rayner (c. 1890 – 1948) was an English botanist specialising in mycology. She published books and articles on plant physiology and was one of the first researchers to propose that mycorrhizal interactions could both help and harm plants.

== Education ==
Rayner received a BSc with honors in botany in 1908 from the University of London. She became interested in studying Calluna vulgaris in 1910, and earned a doctor of science degree for work on this topic, also from the University of London.

== Career ==
Rayner became head of the botany department at University College, Reading. She was on staff there from 1908 to 1918.

While working at University College, Reading Rayner met poet Wilfred Owen. They met during the solar eclipse of 1912 when Owen was visiting the campus to ask about gaining further qualifications. She became a teacher and mentor and kept in touch with him until his death. The editors of Owen's letters argue that Rayner even provided editorial feedback on his writing along with colleague Edith Morley. Rayner was one of the twenty people listed to receive Owen's first book of poems.

She later shared a laboratory with her husband William Neilson Jones at Bedford College, London.

Rayner "thoroughly reviewed" academic research into mycorrhizal research, which had significantly increased in the nineteenth century. After publishing her doctoral thesis on mycorrhizas in 1915, she was employed by The Forestry Commission to undertake research on the mycological relationship in forestry environments. The commission gave Rayner a nursery at Wareham Heath, Dorset to perform research. As part of this research she issued questionnaires to forest departments around the British Empire, most of which were completed and returned. This provided Rayner with significant insight into their pine growing, particularly in Northern Rhodesia, Tanganyika, and Nyasaland. Rayner also travelled to collect samples from different climate zones. In 1926, a discussion at the British Association for the Advancement of Science led Rayner to become more interested in mycorrhiza interactions in conifers.

She published various works about her research, most notably a handful of books still consulted today. Her books have been reprinted as recently as 2018 as they are considered classic introductory-level references in botany.

== Personal life ==
Rayner married William Neilson Jones in 1912. They met in 1910 when she started her research on Calluna vulgaris. They had similar research interests and shared laboratory space at Bedford College where Jones was a professor. Their union was a productive research collaboration in addition to a personal relationship.

== Publications ==
Her books have been reprinted often since their first publication, so these dates may not reflect the earliest printing.

- Neilson-Jones, William; Rayner, Mabel Mary Cheveley (1920). A textbook of plant biology. London: Methuen & Co.
- Rayner, M. C (1922). Nitrogen Fixation in Ericaceae. OCLC 79618085.
- Rayner, M. C (1927). Mycorrhiza: an account of non-pathogenic infection by Fungi in vascular plants and bryophytes. London: Wheldon & Wesley. OCLC 4358688.
- Keeble, Frederick; Rayner, M. C (1931). Practical plant physiology. London: Bell. OCLC 69026483. (Note: This book was likely published in 1911.)
- Rayner, M. C (1933). Mycorrhiza in the genus Citrus,. St. Albans, Eng.: Printed by Fisher, Knight & Co. OCLC 21348438.
- Rayner, Mabel Mary Cheveley (1934). Plant chimaeras and graft hybrids, &c. London. (Note: This book is sometimes attributed to her husband William Neilson Jones. See OCLC 827651426 for instance.)
- Rayner, M. C (1934). Mycorrhiza in relation to forestry. i. i. London. OCLC 1029918084.
- Rayner, M; Neilson-Jones, W (1944). Problems in tree nutrition: a[sic account of researches concerned primarily with the mycorrhizal habit in relation to forestry and some biological aspects of soil fertility]. London: Faber. OCLC 223694539.
- Rayner, Mabel Mary Cheveley (1945). Trees and Toadstools, &c. London. OCLC 191962046.
