= Thirunelveli, Sri Lanka =

Tirunelveli, Sri Lanka
- Country: Sri Lanka
- Province: Northern Province
- Time zone: UTC+5:30 (Sri Lanka Standard Time)

Thirunelveli (pronounced Thinna-veli) is a town in Jaffna District, Sri Lanka. The name in Tamil transliterates to "sacred paddy hedge". It is located about 5 km from Jaffna. This was the location of a LTTE attack that killed 13 soldiers of the Sri Lanka Army in July 1983, triggering the Sri Lankan Civil War.

== See also ==
- Black July
- List of towns in Northern Province, Sri Lanka
