= Mabel Todd =

Mabel Todd may refer to:

Mabel Todd Pines character by Gravity Falls

- Mabel Elsworth Todd (1880–1956), founder of what later came to be known as Ideokinesis, a form of somatic education
- Mabel Loomis Todd (1856–1932), American editor and writer
- Mabel Todd (actress), American actress
