= Kumarapuram (Sri Lanka) =

Coordinates: 9°13′N 80°48′E

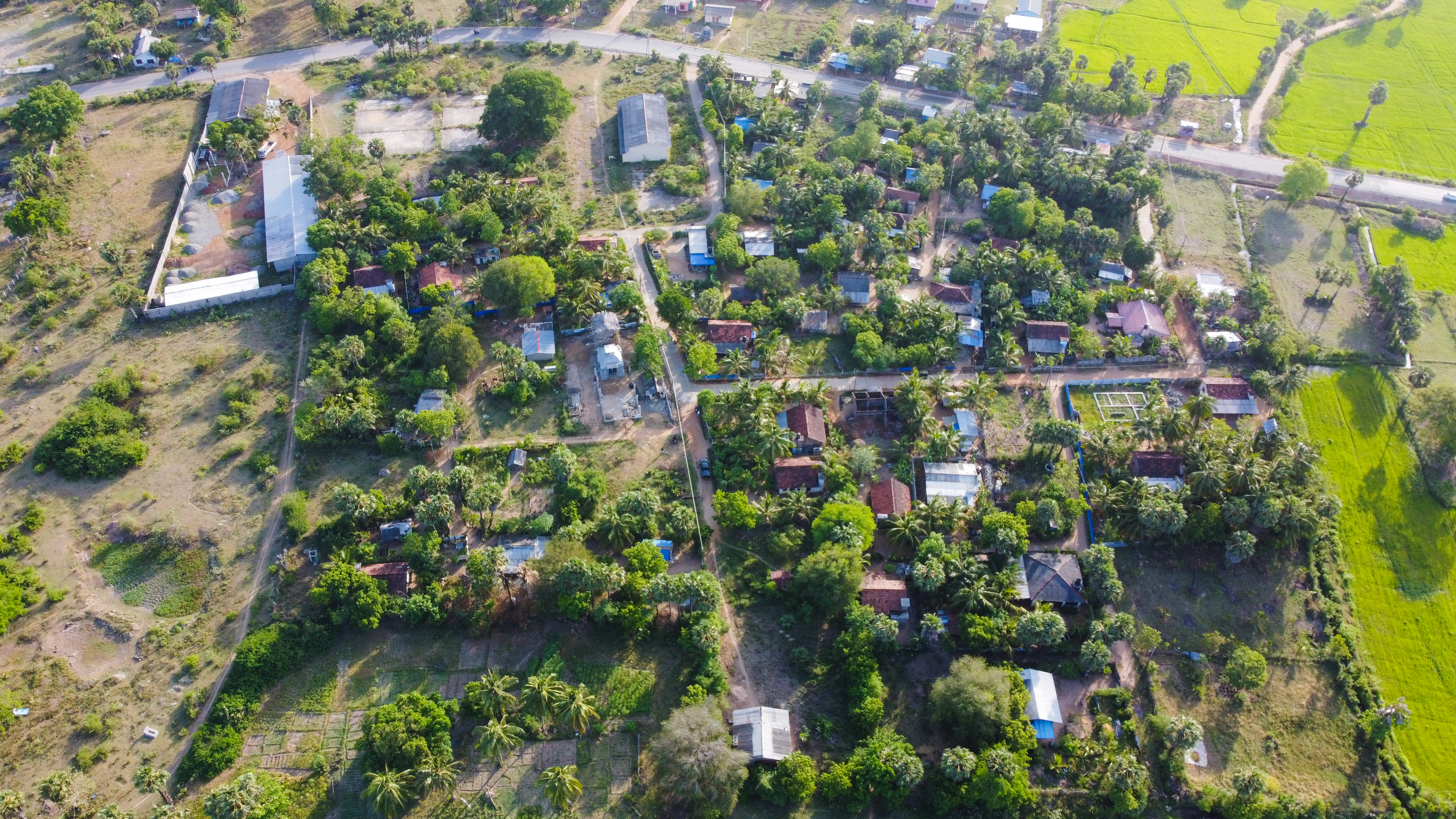
Image of Kumarapuram (10.06.2021)

Kumarapuram (Tamil: குமாரபுரம்) is a small village in Trincomalee district in Sri Lanka. The village was founded in 1981 by Kumarathurai, after whom it is named. It was the scene of the Kumarapuram massacre in 1996.

== Photos ==
- Pictures of Kumarapuram village
