= List of slums in Sri Lanka =

This is a list of slums in Sri Lanka. By 2023, sprawling slums had been eliminated from Colombo due to urban renewal projects and involuntary relocation to high-rise social housing by the government.

- Usavi Watta (Usaui Walta)
- Wanathamulla
- 60 Watta
- 43 Watta
- 187 Watta
- 259 Watta
- Samagiwatta
- Gewal 100
- Sinhapura
- Kubikalya
- Bodhiyawatta
- Trintonwatta
- Raydimolawatta
- Bakery Watta

== See also ==
- List of slums
