= Mabel Thambiah =

Sri Lankan educator (1916–1987)

Mabel Thambiah (23 February 1916 - 17 December 1987) was a Sri Lankan educator.

== Biography ==
Thambiah's parents were Mary Pooranam Thambiah and J.A. Thambiah. She attended Kandy High School and Chundikuli Girls' College, Jaffna. She then moved to Colombo and studied for a Bachelor of Arts degree at University College, Colombo, graduating in 1937.

In 1938, Thambiah was appointed a teacher at Vembadi Girls' High School in Jaffna, specialising in geography. In 1950 she became the school's principal, a position she held until her retirement in 1970.

In 1970, the school opened a new assembly hall, classroom and laboratory building, which was named the Mabel Thambiah Block.

Thambiah was active in community organisations. She was president of the Jaffna branch of the YWCA and vice-president of the national organisation. In 1956, she represented Sri Lanka at a YWCA conference in Japan. She was also president of the Jaffna branch of the University Women's Association.
