= Seruvila Electoral District =

Electoral district of Sri Lanka

Coordinates: 8.3706°N 81.3200°E

Seruvila electoral district was an electoral district of Sri Lanka between July 1977 and February 1989. The district was named after the town of Seruvila in Trincomalee District, Eastern Province. The 1978 Constitution of Sri Lanka introduced the proportional representation electoral system for electing members of Parliament. The existing 160 mainly single-member electoral districts were replaced with 22 multi-member electoral districts. Seruvila electoral district was replaced by the Trincomalee multi-member electoral district at the 1989 general elections, the first under the PR system, though Seruvila continues to be a polling division of the multi-member electoral district.

== Members of Parliament ==
Key

Independent SLFP UNP

Election	Member	Party	Term
1977	H. D. L. Leelaratne	United National Party	1977-1989

== Elections ==
=== 1977 Parliamentary General Election ===
Results of the 8th parliamentary election held on 21 July 1977 for the district:

Candidate	Party	Symbol	Votes	%
H. D. L. Leelaratne		Elephant	14,926	57.30
Premadasa Udagama		Hand	10,567	40.57
Pantis Hettihewa		Key	392	1.51
Victor Perera		Cart Wheel	52	0.20
Valid Votes			25,937	99.57
Rejected Votes			112	0.43
Total Polled			26,049	100.00
Registered Electors			31,250	
Turnout				83.36
