= C. Suntharalingam =

Ceylon Tamil academic and politician

Hon. C. Suntharalingam MP CCS
- செ. சுந்தரலிங்கம்

Minister of Trade and Commerce
- In office 1947–1948
- Succeeded by: H. W. Amarasuriya

Member of the Ceylonese Parliament for Vavuniya
- In office 1947–1960
- Succeeded by: T. Sivasithamparam

Personal details
- Born: Chellappah Suntharalingam; 19 August 1895
- Died: 11 February 1985 (aged 89) Vavuniya, Sri Lanka
- Party: Unity Front of Eelam Tamils
- Education: University of London; Balliol College, Oxford
- Profession: Academic
- Ethnicity: Ceylon Tamil

Chellappah Suntharalingam (Tamil: செல்லப்பா சுந்தரலிங்கம்; 19 August 1895 – 11 February 1985) was a Sri Lankan Tamil academic, politician, Member of Parliament and government minister.

== Early life and family ==
Suntharalingam was born on 19 August 1895. He was the son of Chellappah and Meenachchi from Urumpirai in northern Ceylon. He was educated at St. John's College, Jaffna and St. Joseph's College, Colombo. In 1914 he entered the University of London from where he graduated with a B.Sc. honours degree in mathematics. He then went on to Balliol College, Oxford from where he was awarded a double first in mathematics tripos.

Suntharalingam hailed from a distinguished family and had four eminent brothers: C. Nagalingam, a Supreme Court judge, was acting Governor-General of Ceylon in 1954; C. Panchalingam was a medical doctor; C. Amirthalingam was Director of Fisheries; and C. Thiagalingam was a leading lawyer.

Suntharalingam married Kanagambikai Ambal, daughter of M. Kanagasabi. They had two sons (Gnanalingam and Sathyalingam) and four daughters (Lingambikai, Lingavathy, Lingamani and Lingeswari).

== Career ==
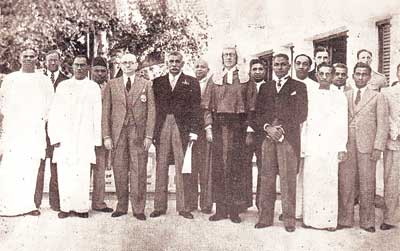
The first Cabinet of independent Ceylon. Suntharalingam is on the far left.

Suntharalingam was selected by the Indian Civil Service but chose instead to join the Ceylon Civil Service in 1920. He resigned from the civil service to become vice principal of Ananda College. He then joined Ceylon University College as professor and first chair of mathematics. He was called to the Bar from Gray's Inn in 1920, becoming an advocate and practising law in Ceylon.

Becoming interested in politics, Suntharalingam retired in 1940 and entered politics. He tried unsuccessfully to enter the State Council during by-elections in 1943 and 1944. He stood as an independent candidate in Vavuniya at the 1947 parliamentary election. He won the election and entered Parliament. He was persuaded to join the United National Party led government and on 26 September 1947 he was sworn in as Minister of Trade and Commerce. He supported the controversial Ceylon Citizenship Act of 1948 which deprived citizenship to 11% of the Ceylon's population but when division was called on the second reading of the Indian and Pakistani Residents Citizenship Bill on 10 December 1948, Suntharalingam walked out of Parliament. Prime Minister D. S. Senanayake asked for an explanation but Suntharalingam resigned from his ministerial position instead. Suntharalingam became a champion for the rights of Ceylon's Indian Tamils who had been made stateless and disenfranchised by Sinhalese dominated governments after independence. He observed that "if the Buddha were to come to the country today, he himself would be deported" (Buddha was from India, the Sinhalese were Buddhists).

Suntharalingam resigned from Parliament in 1951 as a protest against the adoption of the Sinhala kodiya (flag) as the national flag. He was the only candidate in the ensuing by-election and consequently returned to Parliament. He was re-elected at the 1952 parliamentary election. Suntharalingam vehemently opposed the attempts to make Sinhala the sole official language of Ceylon, stating during the June 1955 throne speech that, if the changes went ahead, Tamils would demand "a separate independent autonomous state of 'Tamil Ilankai' composed of Tamil speaking peoples in Ceylon". He boycotted Parliament from August 1955 in protest against the Sinhala Only Act. After three months of absence he forfeited his seat in Parliament. He won the ensuing by-election and returned to Parliament. He was re-elected at the 1956 parliamentary election.

Suntharalingam founded the Eela Thamil Ottrumai Munnani (Unity Front of Eelam Tamils) in 1959. At the March 1960 parliamentary election Suntharalingam, contesting as an independent as the Eela Thamil Ottrumai Munnani wasn't a registered party, was defeated by T. Sivasithamparam, another independent candidate.

Suntharalingam published Eylom: Beginning of the Freedom Struggle; Dozens Documents in 1963 in which he became one of the first Ceylon Tamils to call for an independent Tamil state, which he called Eylom:

I propose to invite those Eyla [Eelath Thamils] Thamils who accept the policy that the time has come for the partition of Ceylon and for the restoration of the Thamil state that existed before the Treaty of Amiens of 1802, to come forward and join the fight for the Freedom and Independence of the Eyla Thamil Nation.

Suntharalingam contested the 1965 parliamentary election as an independent candidate but was defeated by the All Ceylon Tamil Congress candidate T. Sivasithamparam. He contested the 1970 parliamentary election as an independent candidate in Kankesanthurai but was defeated by the Illankai Tamil Arasu Kachchi candidate S. J. V. Chelvanayakam.

Suntharalingam spent his later years in Vavuniya where he died on 11 February 1985.

== Maviddapuram Temple Entry Movement Incident ==
Only high caste Hindus had been allowed to worship in the temple. In 1968 several hundred low caste Hindus, mainly Pallar and Nalavar, staged a non-violent protest outside the temple gates but were met with violence from a group of high caste Hindus. In June 1968 low caste Hindus stormed the temple. They were given access to the temple following the intervention of Illankai Tamil Arasu Kachchi (ITAK, Federal Party).

Suntharalingam, who had led the high caste resistance to opening the temple up to the "low" castes, was prosecuted under the Prevention of Social Disabilities Act and fined Rs. 50 by the Supreme Court. This act, which had been brought in as a private member's bill by ITAK in 1957, made the denial of entry into a place of worship on grounds of caste an offence.
