= T. Ahambaram =

Ceylon Tamil politician (1913–1961)

Hon. T. Ahambaram MP

Member of the Ceylonese Parliament for Mutur
- In office 1960–1962
- Preceded by: M. E. H. Mohamed Ali
- Succeeded by: M. E. H. Mohamed Ali

Personal details
- Born: 12 October 1913
- Died: March 22, 1961 (aged 47) Muttur, Trincomalee District, Ceylon
- Party: Illankai Tamil Arasu Kachchi
- Ethnicity: Ceylon Tamil

Thambiah Ahambaram (also spelled Ehambaram) (12 October 1913 – 22 March 1961) was a Ceylon Tamil politician and Member of Parliament.

Ahambaram was born on 12 October 1913.

Ahambaram stood as the Illankai Tamil Arasu Kachchi's (Federal Party) candidate for Mutur at the March 1960 parliamentary election. He won the election and entered Parliament as the first member for Mutur. He was re-elected at the July 1960 parliamentary election as the first member for Mutur.

In March 1961, Ahambaram participated in a satyagraha demonstration condemning police violence in Jaffna. He was hospitalised after police beating to the head and chest and did not recover from the injuries. He died of a heart attack on 22 March 1961.
