= Meesalai =

Town in Jaffna District, Sri Lanka

Meesalai மீசாலை මීසාලෙයි
- Town
- Location within Northern Province Location within Sri Lanka
- Coordinates: 9°40′20″N 80°11′12″E
- Country: Sri Lanka
- Province: Northern
- District: Jaffna
- Divisional Secretariat: Thenmarachchi

Population (2024)
  - Total: 5,194

Meesalai (Tamil: மீசாலை, romanized: Meesaalai; Sinhala: මීසාලෙයි, romanized: Mīsāleyi) is a town in northern Sri Lanka, located about 18 km (11 mi) east of Jaffna. The town is divided into three village officer divisions (Meesalai East, Meesalai North and Meesalai West) which together had a population of 5,194 at the 2024 census.
