= Black July =

1983 anti-Tamil riots in Sri Lanka

- Part of riots in Sri Lanka, the Sri Lankan Civil War, and the Tamil genocide
- A Tamil youth stripped naked before being killed by Sinhalese rioters near Borella bus stand.

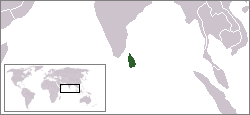
- Location of Sri Lanka
- Location: Sri Lanka
- Date: 24 July 1983 – 30 July 1983 (UTC+6)
- Target: Tamils
- Attack type: Pogrom, ethnic cleansing, mass murder, genocide
- Weapons: Axes, guns, explosives, knives, sticks
- Deaths: 5,638 killed and 466 disappeared (acc. to TCHR)
- Injuries: 2,015 and 670 raped (acc. to TCHR)
- Victim: Tamil civilians
- Perpetrators: Sinhalese mobs, Sri Lankan government, UNP; Sri Lanka Armed Forces and Sri Lanka Police
- No. of participants: Thousands
- Motive: Anti-Tamil racism, Sinhala nationalism

Black July (Tamil: கறுப்பு யூலை, romanized: Kaṟuppu Yūlai; Sinhala: කළු ජූලිය, romanized: Kalu Juliya) was an anti-Tamil pogrom that occurred in Sri Lanka during July 1983. The pogrom was premeditated, and was finally triggered by a deadly ambush on a Sri Lankan Army patrol by the Liberation Tigers of Tamil Eelam (LTTE) on 23 July 1983, which killed 13 soldiers. (Note: George Immerwahr, a United Nations civil servant and U.S. citizen, recounted the following regarding the riots: "the most shattering report came from a [Sinhalese] friend who was a civil servant; he told me that he had himself helped plan the riots at the orders of his superiors. When I heard him say this, I was so shocked I told him I simply couldn't believe him, but he insisted he was telling the truth, and in fact he justified the government's decision to stage the riots. When I heard this, I telephoned an official in our own State Department, and while he declined to discuss the matter, I got the impression that he already knew from our Embassy in Colombo what I was telling him.") Although initially orchestrated by members of the ruling UNP, the pogrom soon escalated into mass violence with significant public participation.

On the night of 24 July 1983, anti-Tamil rioting started in the capital city of Colombo and then spread to other parts of the country. Over seven days, mainly Sinhalese mobs attacked, burned, looted, and killed Tamil civilians. The looting, arson and killings later spread to include all Indians, with the Indian High Commission being attacked and the Indian Overseas Bank being completely destroyed. Estimates of the death toll range between 400 and 3,000, and 150,000 people became homeless. According to Tamil Centre for Human Rights (TCHR), the total number of Tamils killed in the Black July pogrom was 5,638.

Around 18,000 homes and 5,000 shops were destroyed. The economic cost of the riots was estimated to be $300 million. The pogrom was organised to destroy the economic base of the Tamils, with every Tamil owned shop and establishment being plundered and set alight. The NGO International Commission of Jurists described the violence of the pogrom as having "amounted to acts of genocide" in a report published in December 1983.

The pogrom led to the dramatic growth of Tamil militant groups which went from having 20-30 members each to thousands of youths joining their ranks. Prior to this very few Tamils were willing to join the armed struggle. Black July is generally seen as the start of the Sri Lankan civil war between the Tamil militants and the government of Sri Lanka. Sri Lankan Tamils fled to other countries in the ensuing years, with July becoming a period of remembrance for the diaspora around the world. To date no one has been held accountable for any of the crimes committed during the pogrom.

== Background ==
During the period of British colonial rule, Sri Lankan Tamils from the Jaffna Peninsula benefited greatly from educational facilities established by American missionaries. The bulk of missionary schools were located in the Northern Province as well as the south western areas of the island. As a result, the colonial administration recruited many English-speaking Tamils to the civil service and other professions on a merit basis. Tamils came to be overrepresented in the clerical services, professions and universities. By 1946, 33% of clerical jobs in Ceylon were held by Sri Lankan Tamils, although they were 11% of the country's population. After independence, Sinhalese leaders promoted Sinhalese nationalism to appeal to the majority voters and directed hostility against the Tamil minority who were seen as privileged despite the majority of them being no better off.

In 1956, the Official Language Act, commonly known as the Sinhala Only Act, was enacted which made Sinhala the only official language of Sri Lanka with no parity for Tamil. The policy turned out to be "severely discriminatory" and placed the Tamil-speaking population at a "serious disadvantage". Protests against the Sinhala-only policy by Tamils and by the nation's leftist parties were met with mob violence that eventually escalated into the riots of 1958.

Throughout the 1960s, protests, and state repression in response, created further animosity. In 1972, the policy of standardization, which restricted Tamils' entry into universities, strained the already tenuous political relationship between the elites of the Tamil and Sinhalese communities. The quota affecting political representation became another cause for contention between Sinhalese and Tamil people. There was also a series of anti-Tamil pogroms in 1977, following the United National Party's (UNP) coming to power, which further increased hostility. In the 1970s, Tamil militant groups began taking form with notable incidents such as the assassination of Alfred Duraiappah, the Mayor of Jaffna, in 1975 and the killing of Inspector Bastianpillai and his police team in 1978. In 1981, the renowned Jaffna Public Library was burnt down by a violent Sinhalese mob. Until 1983, there had been similar incidents of low-level violence between the government and the mushrooming Tamil militant groups. There were many murders, disappearances, and cases of torture attributed to the Sri Lankan security forces, and several killings of policemen by Tamil militant groups.

== Prelude ==
Between May and June 1983, UNP-affiliated Sinhalese students conducted a series of attacks against Tamil students and staff at Peradeniya University in the south to evict Tamils from the campus. Organised violence by Sinhalese mobs and security forces also commenced against Tamils in Trincomalee between June and July 1983. At least 27 Tamils, including women and children, were killed in the ensuing violence, with hundreds of Tamil homes and properties being destroyed. By mid-1983, the UNP government had adopted a hardline approach to eliminating Tamil militancy in the north. Announcing this policy, President Jayewardene stated the following in an interview with The Daily Telegraph on 12 July 1983, which has been seen as evidence of the state's complicity in the later riot:

I am not worried about the opinion of the Jaffna (Tamil) people now. Now we cannot think of them. Not about their lives or of their opinion about us. The more you put pressure in the north, the happier the Sinhala people will be here... really, if I starve the Tamils, Sinhala people will be happy....

On 17 July 1983, a pro-government Dawasa Group newspaper released a headline stating in Sinhala: "To counter Northern Terrorism, there is going to emerge another Terrorism". It specifically stated that after 22nd and 23rd July "a very strong course of action" would be taken to eliminate "terrorism". On 18 July, the government extended the emergency regulations country-wide which allowed disposal of dead bodies without inquest and on the 20th imposed press censorship on all matters concerning "terrorism".

== Black July ==
=== Saturday, 23 July ===
On 23 July 1983 at around 11:30 pm, the rebel group LTTE ambushed the Four Four Bravo military patrol in Thirunelveli, near Jaffna in northern Sri Lanka. A roadside bomb was detonated beneath a jeep that was leading the convoy, injuring at least two soldiers on board. Soldiers travelling in the truck behind the jeep then dismounted to help their fellow soldiers. Subsequently, they were ambushed by a group of LTTE fighters who fired at them with automatic weapons and hurled grenades. In the ensuing clash, one officer and twelve soldiers were killed, with two more fatally wounded, for a total of fifteen dead. A number of the rebels were also killed. Col. Kittu, a regional commander of the LTTE, would later admit to planning and carrying out the ambush. This attack has been described as retaliation for the killing of one of the LTTE's founding members, Charles Anthony, by Sri Lankan Army and for the alleged abduction and rape of three Tamil schoolgirls in Jaffna by the Army. Around midnight, following the news of the attack, the Army began to move all their Tamil officers from Colombo and Panagoda to a camp in Ampara, in an isolated area not affected by the subsequent riots.

=== Sunday, 24 July ===
In response to the ambush, truckloads of Sri Lankan soldiers left the Palaly camp at 4:30 AM, smashing all the shops on the way to Thirunelveli. Over 60 Tamil civilians in Jaffna were subsequently massacred by the rampaging army in revenge. Whereas the prior killing of soldiers was reported instantly in the local Sri Lankan media, this subsequent massacre of civilians was not reported and remained unknown to the Sinhalese public.

The Army—including its commander, Tissa Weeratunga—decided that the soldiers' funerals should not be held in Jaffna because of the high likelihood of disturbances at multiple locations. The decision was made to hold the funerals, with full military honours, at Kanatte Cemetery, Colombo's main burial ground, instead. Prime Minister Ranasinghe Premadasa, fearing violence, was against holding the funeral in Colombo, but was overruled by President J. R. Jayewardene. The president, the prime minister, and the rest of the cabinet were to attend the funeral, which was to take place at 5 pm on 24 July. This arrangement went against the standard procedure of handing over fallen soldiers to their families for burial in their home villages.

Preparations were made for the funeral, including putting the riot squad at the police station in nearby Borella on standby; but by 5 pm the bodies hadn't arrived in Colombo. The soldiers' families wanted the bodies handed over to them and to be buried according to tradition. Due to procedural issues, the bodies were still at Palali Army Camp near Jaffna. The bodies were eventually moved from Palali Air Force Base shortly after 6 pm. Whilst this was occurring, tensions were growing at Colombo General Cemetery because of the delay. A large crowd, including around 3,000 people from the Wanathamulla slum, started gathering at the cemetery, angered by news of the ambush, which was magnified by wild rumour.

The Avro plane carrying the bodies arrived at Ratmalana Airport at 7:20 pm, by which time the crowd at the cemetery had swollen to more than 8,000. The crowd wanted the bodies to be handed over to the families rather than to be buried at the cemetery. Violence broke out between the crowd and police, and the riot squad was summoned. The riot squad then fired tear gas at the crowd and baton-charged them before handing control of the situation over to the army. The president then decided to cancel the military funeral and hand the bodies over to the families. The vehicles carrying the bodies had been driven away from Ratmalana at 8:30 pm and the drivers were heading to the cemetery. Due to the situation, the bodies were then diverted to army headquarters, so that they could be handed over to the families. The crowd at the cemetery was informed of the president's decision at around 10 pm. The crowd left the cemetery in a restive mood.

A section of the crowd marched up D. S. Senanayake Mawatha to Borella, where they destroyed Tamil-owned Nagalingam Stores. The mob—which by that time numbered around 10,000—attacked, looted, and set fire to any building near Borella Junction that had a Tamil connection, including Borella Flats and the Tamil Union Cricket and Athletic Club. Tamil shops and houses were also burned with their furniture and goods destroyed. The police fired tear gas at the crowd; but after exhausting all of their stock, they were then forced to fire their rifles into the air. The crowd then dispersed in the direction of Dematagoda, Maradana, Narahenpita, Grandpass, and Thimbirigasyaya, where they attacked and looted Tamil properties and set them alight. Members of criminal gangs came to join the ensuing chaos. Students from Buddhist schools also followed the first rioters, which included some Buddhist monks. Just hours after the news of the ambush reached Colombo, small gangs were on the streets with typewritten lists of the names and addresses of Tamil owned properties, suggesting prior planning and organisation.

=== Monday, 25 July ===
President Jayewardene convened the country's Security Council at the President's House, at 9:30 a.m. on 25 July. A hundred yards away, the Bristol building, and the Tamil-owned Ambal Cafe, was ablaze. Also close by, on York Street, the Tamil-owned clothier Sarathas was ablaze as well. Soon all the Tamil-owned shops on Baillie Street opposite the President's House were on fire. Every Tamil-owned business in the Fort area was on fire by the time the Security Council meeting finished. The President ordered a curfew in Colombo from 6 pm. The mob moved on to Olcott Mawatha, where they set fire to the Tamil-owned Ananda Bhawan food store, Rajeswari Stores, and the Ajantha Hotel.

The President's ministers were seen that morning in various parts of Colombo directing their thugs to attack Tamils and their properties. Cyril Mathew was seen in Colombo Fort, R. Premadasa’s trusted henchmen, mainly pavement hawkers, in Pettah, Colombo Mayor’s thugs and municipal labourers and Transport minister M. H. Mohamed’s men in Borella, District Minister Weerasinghe Mallimarachchi’s thugs in Colombo north and Deputy Minister Anura Bastian’s thugs in Colombo South. In downtown Colombo, a Tamil shop was firebombed by a Sinhalese mob. A tiny old woman running with the mob shouted:

"The Sinhalese blood is boiling...The Tamils have brought this on themselves. They have killed our soldiers. They have shot our policemen. They have murdered our leaders. So today, in the name of King Dutugamunu, it is our turn."

By 10 am, the rioting had spread to the slums of Canal Bank, Grandpass, Hattewatte, Kirilapone, Kotahena, Maradana, Modara, Mutwal, Narahenpita, Slave Island, and Wanathamulla. Mobs armed with crowbars and kitchen knives roamed the streets, attacking and killing Tamils. Wellawatte and Dehiwala, which contained the largest number of Tamils in Colombo, were the next target of the mob. Homes and shops were attacked, looted, and destroyed. Tamil shops on Main Street and Bo Tree Junction were also attacked. The riots then spread to the middle-class residential areas of Anderson Flats, Elvitigala Flats, Torrington Flats, and Thimbirigasyaya. Tamil targets in the exclusive Cinnamon Gardens were also attacked, as were those in the suburbs of Kadawatha, Kelaniya, Nugegoda, and Ratmalana. The residence of the Indian High Commissioner was also attacked and ransacked. Its members were brutally attacked with iron rods and chased and kicked by a gang of 25 armed Sinhala youths. By lunchtime, virtually the entire city was on fire. The curfew was advanced to 4:00 pm and then to 2:00 pm, and it was extended to include Gampaha District, due to the violence spreading as far as Negombo. In Kalutara, the TKVS Stores were set on fire. The owner jumped out of an upstairs window, but the mob threw him back into the fire. The curfew was then extended to Kalutara District.

The police being unable, or unwilling, to enforce the curfew, the army was called in to assist the police.

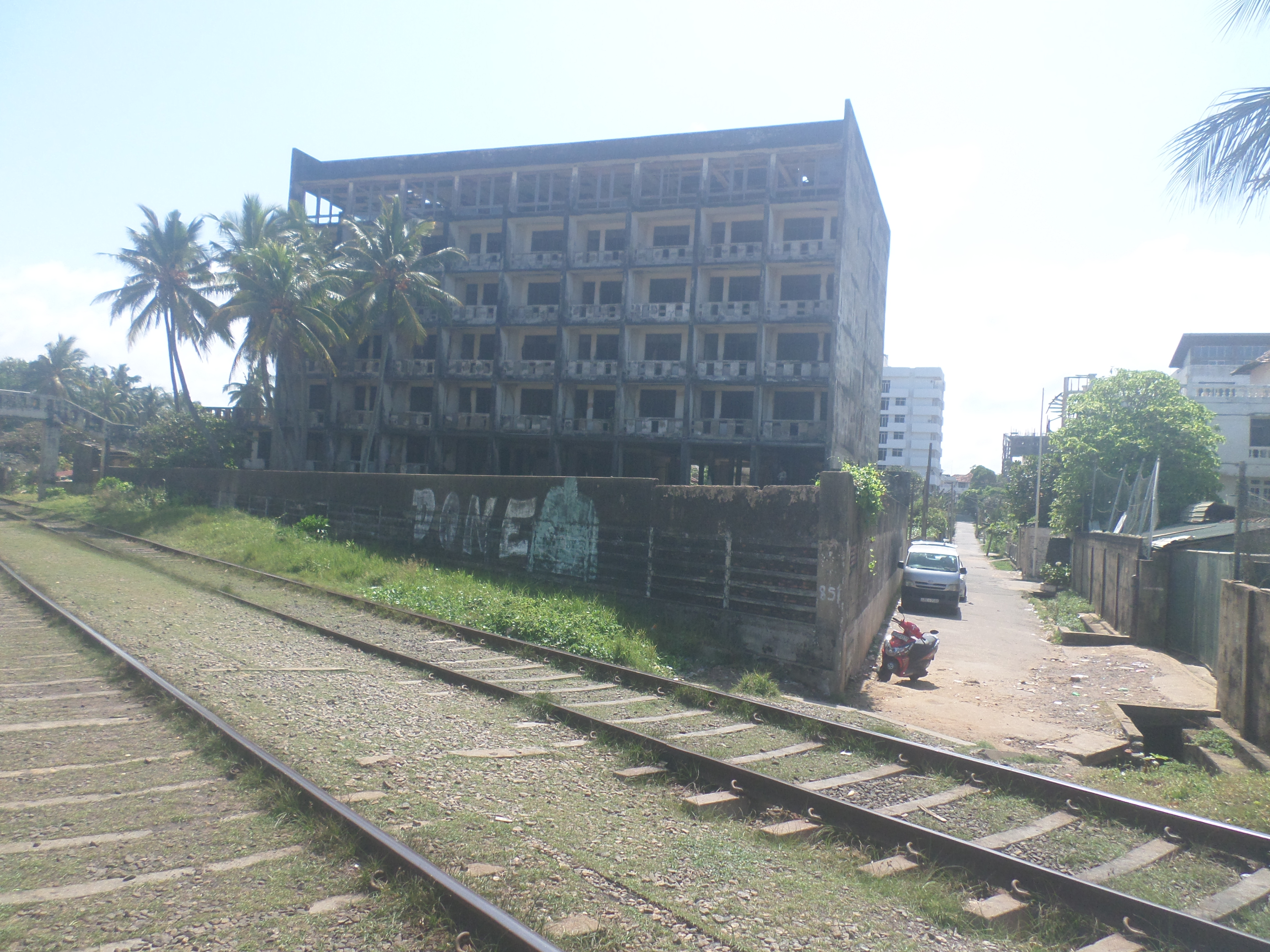
Tilly's Beach Hotel in Mount Lavinia, destroyed by rioters in Black July (picture from 2020)

The rioters used voter registration lists to target Tamils. The possession of electoral lists by the mobs, which enabled them to identify Tamil homes and property, implied prior organization and cooperation by elements of the government. As President Jayewardene would later admit in a statement, "a pattern of organization and planning has been noticed in the rioting and looting that took place." Eighty-one out of the 92 Tamil-owned flats at Soysa Flats were attacked, looted, and set on fire. The mob attacked the industrial area of Ratmalana, which contained a number of Tamil-owned factories. Jetro Garments and Tata Garments on Galle Road were completely gutted. Other factories attacked included Ponds, S-Lon, Reeves Garments, Hydo Garments, Hyluck Garments, AGM Garments, Manhattan Garments, Ploy Peck, Berec, and Mascons Asbestos. Indian-owned factories such as Kundanmals, Oxford, and Bakson Garments were not attacked, giving credence to the suggestion that the mob was deliberately going after Sri Lankan Tamil targets. Seventeen factories were destroyed in Ratmalana. Capital Maharaja, a Tamil-owned company, is one of Sri Lanka's largest conglomerates. Six of their factories in Ratmalana and their headquarters in Bankshall Street were destroyed. The mob ended the day by setting fire to Tilly's Beach Hotel in Mount Lavinia. The hotel is a burnt-out hulk to this day (image at right).

One of the most notorious incidents of the rioting took place at the Welikada Prison on 25 July. Fifty three Tamil prisoners, most of them detained under the Prevention of Terrorism Act, were killed by Sinhalese prisoners using knives and clubs. Survivors claimed that prison officers allowed their keys to fall into the hands of Sinhalese prisoners; but at the subsequent inquest, prison officers claimed that the keys had been stolen from them. Amnesty International however, reported that the Sinhala prisoners were assisted by prison authorities in killing the Tamil inmates, with reports of cell doors being left open on purpose. The superintendent in charge of the prison, Alexis Leo de Silva, later testified that the "army aided and abetted" the murders. He witnessed them cheering and saying "Jayawewa" (victory) whilst the incident was occurring.

While a number of Tamils fled the city, many Sinhalese and Muslims saved the lives and properties of Tamils despite the activities of the gangs. Many Tamils were sheltered in government buildings, temples as well as Sinhalese and Muslim houses in the following days.

Outside of the Western Province, there was violence in Galle, Kegalle, Trincomalee, and Vavuniya. In Badulla, a Tamil shop called 'Sri Lanka Stores' is set alight by a mob.

=== Tuesday, 26 July ===
The mob attacks continued in Wellawatte and Dehiwala on 26 July. There were 53 houses on Ratnakara Road. The 24 Tamil owned/occupied houses were burnt. Three houses had Sinhalese owners but were rented by Tamils. The mob removed the property from these three houses out to the road and burnt it. The three houses were not burnt down, neither were the 26 Sinhalese owned/occupied houses. In many parts of the city, the Army merely looked on as property was destroyed and people were killed.

The violence spread to the country's second largest city, Kandy, on 26 July. By 2:45 pm Delta Pharmacy on Peradeniya Road was on fire. Soon afterwards, a Tamil-owned shop near the Laksala building was set on fire; and the violence spread to Castle Street and Colombo Street. The police managed to get control of the situation, but an hour later a mob armed with petrol cans and Molotov cocktails started attacking Tamil shops on Castle, Colombo, King's, and Trincomalee streets. The mob then moved on to nearby Gampola. A curfew was imposed in Kandy District on the evening of 26 July. Outside of Badulla town, a house owned by a Tamil shop owner is set on fire.

In Trincomalee, false rumours started spreading that the LTTE had captured Jaffna, that the Karainagar Naval Base had been destroyed, and that the Naga Vihare had been desecrated. About 130 sailors based at Trincomalee Naval Base went on a rampage, attacking Central Road, Dockyard Road, Main Street, and North Coast Road. The sailors started 170 fires and damaged 175 properties before returning to their base. The Sivan Hindu temple on Thirugnasambandan Road also was attacked. One person was killed and several injured in the rampage.

The curfew was extended nationwide on 26 July as a precautionary measure. There were more outbreaks of violence and looting against Tamils in areas where various ethnic groups had coexisted. By the evening of 26 July, the mob violence began to slacken as police and army units patrolled the streets in large numbers and began to take action against the rioters. The soldiers killed in the Thirunelveli ambush were quietly buried during the night curfew.

=== Wednesday, 27 July ===
In the Central Province, the violence spread to Nawalapitiya and Hatton. Around 10am, in Badulla, the largest city in neighbouring Uva Province, a crowd of around 15 people led by 'Sama' a prominent UNP and municipal council member attack the Tamil owned 'Gowrie store' with petrol bombs and torches. At around 10:30 a.m. on 27 July, a Tamil-owned motorcycle was set on fire in front of the clock tower. Around midday an organised mob went through the city's bazaar area, setting shops on fire. The rioting then spread to residential areas, and the homes of many Tamils were burnt down. The home of one Mr Ramanathan, an Indian Tamil camphor dealer in Badulla was attacked by the Sri Lanka Army with the support of UNP MP Vincent Dias' three brothers and a Sinhalese mob. They shot and hacked to death Mr Ramanathan, his brother, his four sons (aged from 15-22), his crippled father, and brother-in-law. Mr Ramanathan was himself disembowelled and his head was staved in. Other Tamils killed included a tenant and the tenant's three-year-old daughter and brother-in-law. The army then burned the house and surrounding vehicles, throwing the 15 dead bodies into the flames. All Tamil shops and three Tamil schools were destroyed in Badulla, and four Hindu temples were also looted and burnt.

The mob then left the city in vans and buses that they had stolen and headed for Bandarawela, Hali-Ela, and Welimada, where they continued to set properties on fire. The riot had spread to Lunugala by nightfall.

The daytime curfew in Colombo was lifted on 27 July, and the day began in relative calm. But then at Fort Railway Station, a train heading for Jaffna was stopped as it was pulling out of Platform One after cartridges were found on the track. Sinhalese passengers on the train started attacking Tamil passengers, killing twelve. Some Tamils were burnt alive on the railway tracks.

Following the riot at Welikada prison on 25 July, Tamil prisoners had been moved from the Chapel Ward to the Youth Offenders Building. On the evening of 27 July, Sinhalese prisoners overpowered the guards, armed themselves with axes and firewood, and attacked those Tamil prisoners. Fifteen Tamil prisoners were killed. Two Tamil prisoners and a third prisoner were killed during a riot at Jaffna prison on the same day.

=== Thursday, 28 July ===
Badulla was still on fire on 28 July, and the rioting spread from Lunugala to Passara. There was also rioting in Nuwara Eliya and Chilaw. But the violence had subsided in Colombo, Kandy, and Trincomalee.

President Jayewardene and his cabinet met in an emergency session on 28 July. Jayewardene then made a primetime televised address in which he appealed for an end to the violence. Jayewardene blamed the violence on "the deep ill feeling and suspicion that has grown between the Sinhalese and the Tamil people" caused by the calls for an independent Tamil state that began in 1976, when the Tamil United Liberation Front, the largest political party representing the Tamils, had passed the Vaddukoddai Resolution. He blamed the violence committed by the Tamil militants for the way "the Sinhalese people themselves have reacted". Jayewardene vowed that the "Sinhalese people will never agree to the division of a country which has been a united nation for 2,500 years [sic]" and announced that the government would "accede to the clamour...of the Sinhalese people" and ban any party which sought to divide the nation.

Indian Prime Minister Indira Gandhi called Jayewardene on 28 July and informed him of the impact the riots had had in India. She requested that Jayewardene receive Minister of External Affairs P. V. Narasimha Rao as her special envoy. Jayewardene accepted, and a few hours later Rao arrived in Sri Lanka.

=== Friday, 29 July ===
Colombo was still calm on 29 July. Tamil residents visited friends and relatives who had taken refuge in the many refugee camps in the city. Around 10:30 a.m. two Sinhalese youths were shot on Gas Works Street. A large crowd gathered at the scene, and soon rumours started circling that the youths had been shot by Tamil Tigers from the Adam Ali building. The building was surrounded by the army, navy, and police who proceeded to fire at the building using submachine guns and semi-automatic rifles. A helicopter also fired at the building with a machine gun. The security forces stormed the building but found no Tamil Tigers, weapons, or ammunition inside. However, rumours began to spread around Colombo that the army was engaged in a battle with the Tamil Tigers. Panicking workers began to flee in any mode of transport they could find. Mobs started gathering in the streets—armed with axes, bricks, crowbars, iron rods, kitchen knives, and stones—ready to fight the Tigers. The Tigers never came, so the mobs turned their attention to the fleeing workers. Vehicles were stopped and searched for Tamils. Any Tamil they found was attacked and set on fire. A Tamil was burnt alive on Kirula Road. Eleven Tamils were burnt alive on Attidiya Road. The police found an abandoned van, on the same road, that contained the butchered bodies of two Tamils and three Muslims. Police shot dead 15 rioters. An elderly Plantation Tamil man who worked for a Sinhalese family as a gardener was chased by his employer with a kitchen knife. At 2 pm on 29 July, a curfew came into force which lasted until 5 am on Monday 1 August.

Badulla, Kandy, and Trincomalee were calm on 29 July; but there was violence in Nuwara Eliya, beginning around midday. The Tamil-owned Ganesan and Sivalingam stores were attacked and set on fire. The violence then spread to Bazaar Street and Lawson Road. Violence was also reported in Kegalle District and Matara District. In Kegalle District the violence spread from Dehiowita to Deraniyagala to Avissawella. In Matara District the worst affected areas were Deniyaya and Morawake. There was violence in Chilaw as well. In Matale town, a Tamil owned bus is burnt outside a Hindu temple along with a 100 foot high temple cart, this is then followed by further looting and arson.

Indian External Affairs Minister Rao held discussions with President Jayewardene and Foreign Minister A. C. S. Hameed before visiting Kandy by helicopter.

=== Saturday, 30 July ===
Violence was reported in Nuwara Eliya, Kandapola, Hawa Eliya, and Matale on 30 July. In Kandapola, all Tamil shops were destroyed by fire. The rest of the country was quiet. That night the government banned three left-wing political parties—the Communist Party of Sri Lanka, Janatha Vimukthi Peramuna, and the Nava Sama Samaja Party—blaming them for inciting the riots. A few leaders of other groups were arrested, as well.

== Government's response ==
The president and top ranking members of the cabinet publicly justified the pogrom. Although the violence was first started by Sinhalese mobs who had gathered at the Colombo cemetery where the bodies of the soldiers were to be buried, they were later joined by elements associated with Sinhalese political activists involved in the organisation of the riots. During the early stages of the riots, it is alleged that the local police and military stood by and did nothing, or even assisted the mobs. Numerous eyewitness accounts suggest that "in many places police and even military personnel joined the rioters".

The Sri Lankan government was accused from various corners of being complicit during the pogrom and of supporting and encouraging the Sinhalese mobs. President Jayewardene has been accused of failing to condemn the violence or to express sympathy to the survivors, blaming Tamils for bringing it upon themselves, failing to take any meaningful measures to punish the perpetrators of the violence, and praising the mobs as heroes of the Sinhalese people.

The finance minister Ronnie de Mel in an interview with The Economist on 20 August tried to justify the pogrom by claiming that "the Tamils have dominated the commanding heights of everything good in Sri Lanka", and that the "only solution" was to "restore the rights of the Sinhalese majority". Commenting on this communal statement, author L. Piyadasa pointed out that the minister himself belonged to a caste community, Karava, that was overrepresented in leading positions in society.

Another cabinet minister Cyril Mathew stated in parliament that the pogroms targeting the Tamils were "long overdue and only a spark was needed to make it happen and that the spark fell on 24th July". On August 4th, he further defended the violence in parliament by stating that the Sinhala people had been "frustrated for years" and had been "discriminated", and that "if the Sinhala is the majority race, why can't they be the majority?" He is widely regarded as one of the key ministers responsible for instigating the pogrom, and was seen leading mobs to burn Tamil businesses.

On Friday 29th July, the Prime Minister Ranasinghe Premadasa in a nationwide broadcast blamed the Tamils for the week long mayhem that occurred during the pogrom. Another minister Ranil Wickremasinghe stated that the burning of factories and other premises belonging to Tamils during the pogrom was "nothing compared to the tragedy imposed on the Sinhala entrepreneur by the Bandaranaikes since 1956." He claimed that the SLFP had favoured the Tamils through their nationalization policies to the detriment of Sinhalese entrepreneurs.

The government denied any involvement of its members and blamed the opposition for the riots and banned the Communist Party, the Nava Sama Samaja Party and the Janatha Vimukthi Peramuna (JVP). The claims were disputed by the opposition and were not widely accepted. JVP which had entered democratic politics after first failed insurrection was forced to go underground resurfacing to launch its second insurrection in 1987.

On August 4th, Sarath Muttetuwegama questioned the government in parliament on why it did not announce an immediate curfew on the morning of 25th July, when violence had begun the previous evening. He further stated:

"Everybody knows Sir, the houses and the areas that were attacked, that State CTB buses came with thugs. If you go and ask your friends in those areas you will know. Electricity board vehicles brought thugs to Agalawatte. The state apparatus was used..."

Following the riots, Prime Minister Premadasa formed a committee to organise shelter for, and feeding of, an estimated 20,000 homeless Tamils in Colombo. These temporary shelters were situated at five school buildings and an aircraft hangar. After the number of refugees increased to around 50,000, the government, with help from India, took measures to transport Tamils north on ships.

A few weeks after the pogrom, in September 1983, Gamini Dissanayake, a cabinet minister, gave this message to Tamil estate workers in reference to the violence:

Who attacked you? Sinhalese. Who protected you? Sinhalese. It is we who can attack and protect you. They are bringing an army from India. It will take 14 hours to come from India. In 14 minutes, the blood of every Tamil in this country can be sacrificed by us. It is not written on anyone's forehead he is an Indian or Jaffna Tamil, a Batticaloa Tamil or Upcountry Tamil. Hindu Tamil or Christian Tamil. All are Tamils.

== Eyewitness accounts ==
Mobs armed with petrol were seen stopping passing motorists at critical street junctions. After ascertaining the ethnic identity of the driver and passengers, they set alight the vehicles, with the drivers and passengers trapped inside. Mobs were also seen stopping buses to identify Tamil passengers, who were subsequently knifed, clubbed to death, or burned alive. One Norwegian tourist saw a mob set fire to a minibus with 20 people inside, killing them all. According to eyewitness testimony of a victim who survived the riots, Buddhist monks were among the rioters.

The Tamil Guardian lists more eyewitness testimonies from various sources:

London's The Daily Telegraph (26 July) wrote:

Motorists were dragged from their cars to be stoned and beaten with sticks. Others were cut down with knives and axes. Mobs of Sinhala youth rampaged through the streets, ransacking homes, shops and offices, looting them and setting them ablaze, as they sought out members of the Tamil ethnic minority. A mob attacked a Tamil cyclist riding near Colombo's eye hospital. The cyclist was hauled from his bike, drenched with petrol and set alight. As he ran screaming down the street, the mob set on him again and hacked him down with jungle knives.

In his book, The Tragedy of Sri Lanka, William McGowan wrote:

While travelling on a bus when a mob laid siege to it, passengers watched as a small boy was hacked 'to limb-less death'. The bus driver was ordered to give up a Tamil. He pointed out a woman who was desperately trying to erase the mark on her forehead—called a kumkum—as the thugs bore down on her. The woman's belly was ripped open with a broken bottle and she was immolated as people clapped and danced. In another incident, two sisters, one eighteen and one eleven, were decapitated and raped, the latter 'until there was nothing left to violate and no volunteers could come forward', after which she was burned. While all this was going on, a line of Buddhist monks appeared, arms flailing, their voices raised in a delirium of exhortation, summoning the Sinhalese to put all Tamils to death.

The London Daily Express (29 July) wrote:

Mrs Eli Skarstein, back home in Stavanger, Norway, told how she and her 15 year old daughter, Kristen witnessed one massacre. 'A mini bus full of Tamils were forced to stop in front of us in Colombo', she said. A Sinhalese mob poured petrol over the bus and set it on fire. They blocked the car door and prevented the Tamils from leaving the vehicle. 'Hundreds of spectators watched as about 20 Tamils were burnt to death.' Mrs. Skarstein added: 'We can't believe the official casualty figures. Hundreds, maybe thousands, must have been killed already. The police force (which was 95% Sinhalese) did nothing to stop the mobs. There was no mercy. Women, children and old people were slaughtered. Police did nothing to stop the genocide.'

The Times of London reported on 5 August that "...Army personnel actively encouraged arson and the looting of Tamil business establishments and homes in Colombo", and that "absolutely no action was taken to apprehend or prevent the criminal elements involved in these activities. In many instances, army personnel participated in the looting of shops."

The Economist of 6 August wrote: "...But for days the soldiers and policemen were not overwhelmed; they were unengaged or, in some cases, apparently abetting the attackers. Numerous eyewitnesses attest that soldiers and policemen stood by while Colombo burned."

The Hindu reported that German holiday makers from Düsseldorf witnessed "hundreds of Tamils being murdered" and stated that their hotel waiter proudly told them "we have killed several of them."

Paul Sieghart of the International Commission of Jurists stated in Sri Lanka: A Mounting Tragedy of Errors, two months after the riots, that:

"Clearly this (July 1983 attack) was no spontaneous upsurge of communal hatred among the Sinhala people – nor was it as has been suggested in some quarters, a popular response to the killing of 13 soldiers in an ambush the previous day by Tamil Tigers, which was not even reported in the newspapers until the riots began. It was a series of deliberate acts, executed in accordance with a concerted plan, conceived and organized well in advance".

An eyewitness interviewed by India Today recalled how the Sri Lanka Army destroyed and ransacked a huge block of shops next to the police HQ:

"The shops in this block had heavy grill doors, so an army truck was used as a battering ram to break through them, and then the soldiers sprang in with Sinhala battle cries to claim the lion's share of the loot."

One Indian tourist Dharmalingam of Thuraiyur witnessed a Sinhalese mob in Kotahena entering a number of houses and butchering the Tamil occupants. He witnessed a one-year-old child being thrown about by the Sinhalese like a ball, before one of them squeezed its neck. The child was then trampled on. The parents of the child were also butchered.

Other witnesses described injured Tamils being asked to leave the Colombo General Hospital despite being too unwell for discharge, while no Sinhalese patient was asked to leave. The wounded patients were brought to a refugee camp, where one patient, Manian, had festering leg wounds and had a bottle of pus extracted from his head injury alone. N. Shanmugathasan, the general secretary of the Ceylon Communist Party stated that Tamil patients in hospitals were also attacked and killed, with some having their throats slit whilst lying in bed.

One Tamil former naval officer whose house was destroyed in the riots stated:

"It was very well organized. Where the Tamil owned the house, they burned the house. Where the Tamil rented, they burned only the belongings. By the time they said that looters would be shot, everything was looted."

== Casualty estimates ==
The estimates of casualties vary. According to the Tamil Centre for Human Rights (TCHR), 5,638 Tamils were massacred, 2,015 were injured, 466 were missing, 670 were raped, and 250,000 were internally displaced. While the government initially stated just 300 Tamils were killed, various NGOs and international agencies estimate that between 400 and 3,000 people, believed to be Sri Lankan Tamils or Hill Country Tamils, were killed in the riots. Fifty-three political prisoners were killed in the Welikade prison massacre. More than 18,000 houses and numerous commercial establishments were destroyed, and hundreds of thousands of Tamils fled the country to Europe, Australia and Canada.

== Aftermath ==
Following the pogrom, thousands of Tamil youths joined various militant groups in what was a turning point in the armed conflict. Many Tamils left Colombo permanently. Those that remained in Colombo maintained a low profile and concealed their ethnic identity. Many of them found their Sinhalese friends to be unsympathetic and most Sinhalese conflated them with Tamil militants in the north. Violent anti-Tamil sentiments continued to be expressed among Sinhalese. Reflecting such a mood, Francis Wheen of the New Statesman reported the following in the aftermath of the pogrom:

A few minutes after arriving in Sri Lanka last month, I was sitting on the pavement outside Katunayake airport, watching the birds and the dragonflies. A Sinhalese youth sat down beside me, apparently keen to talk about the recent violence against the country's Tamils. "Tamils all gone from Colombo now", he said, with a broad grin, "Tamil shops all burned. Perhaps all Tamil people will go to India now". His tone was gleefully triumphant. "Sri Lanka is for Sinhalese people", he concluded.'

== Prosecutions and compensation ==
A presidential commission appointed during the subsequent People's Alliance government estimated that nearly 300 people were killed and 18,000 establishments, including houses, were destroyed. The commission recommended that restitution be paid. Thus far no restitution has been paid nor have any criminal proceedings begun against anyone involved.

== Remembrance ==
July has become a time of mourning and remembrance amongst the Sri Lankan Tamil diaspora around the world, which comes together to commemorate the loss of Tamils. This has happened in countries such as Canada, Switzerland, Norway, Denmark, Germany, France, Britain, Australia, and New Zealand.

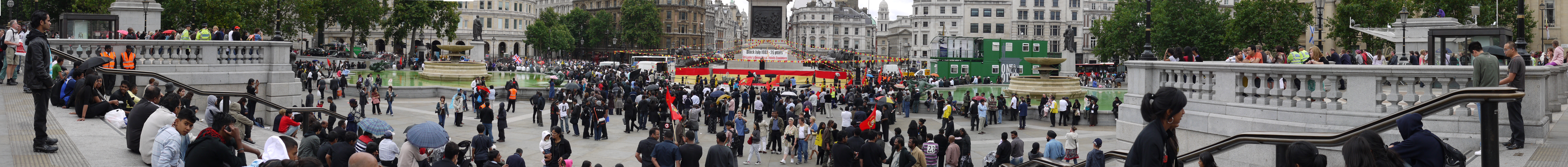
Panorama of the Black July's 26th anniversary remembrance day observed at Trafalgar Square in London in 2009

== See also ==
- Sexual violence against Tamils in Sri Lanka#1983 anti-Tamil pogrom
- List of attacks on civilians attributed to Sri Lankan government forces
- Tamil genocide
