= List of people assassinated by the Liberation Tigers of Tamil Eelam =

The following is a list of notable people assassinated by the Liberation Tigers of Tamil Eelam, commonly known as Tamil Tigers or as LTTE. The LTTE was a militant organisation that was based in northern Sri Lanka, which fought for a separate Tamil state in the north and east of Sri Lanka between 1983 and 2009. The LTTE was decisively defeated by the Sri Lankan Military in May 2009 and it has been banned by 33 countries, including the United States, United Kingdom, Canada, India, Malaysia, Sri Lanka and the 27 member nations of the European Union. At the height of its power, the LTTE possessed a well-developed militia and carried out many high-profile attacks, including the assassinations of an Indian prime minister, Sri Lankan president and several other high-ranking Sri Lankan politicians. Some of the notable people who survived the assassination attempts of LTTE, are also included at the bottom of this list.

== Heads of state and government ==
- Ranasinghe Premadasa – President of Sri Lanka
- Rajiv Gandhi – Former Prime Minister of India

== Government ministers ==
- Lalith Athulathmudali – Former Sri Lankan Cabinet Minister of Trade, National Security, Agriculture, Education and Deputy Minister of Defence; DUNF MP (Note: Other sources blame Athulathmudali's assassination on the Security Forces.)
- Gamini Dissanayake – UNP presidential candidate; Leader of the Opposition; Former Sri Lankan Cabinet Minister of Irrigation, Power, Highways, Land, Land Development, Plantation Industries, Mahaweli and Mahaweli Development; Former Chairman of the Sri Lanka Cricket Board; UNP MP
- Ranjan Wijeratne – Sri Lankan Cabinet Minister of Foreign Affairs, Plantation Industries and Minister of State for Defense; UNP MP
- Lakshman Kadirgamar – Sri Lankan Cabinet Minister of Foreign Affairs of Sri Lanka; Prominent Tamil diplomat; lawyer; SLFP MP
- Jeyaraj Fernandopulle – Sri Lankan Cabinet Minister of Highways & Road Development; Chief Government Whip of the Parliament of Sri Lanka; SLFP MP
- C. V. Gunaratne – Sri Lankan Cabinet Minister of Industries Development; SLFP MP
- Weerasinghe Mallimarachchi – Former Sri Lankan Cabinet Minister of Food, Co-operative, and Janasaviya-Poverty Alleviation; SLFP MP
- G. M. Premachandra – Former Sri Lankan Cabinet Minister of Labour and Vocational Training; Former UNP MP
- D. M. Dassanayake – Former Sri Lankan Non-Cabinet Minister of Nation Building; SLFP MP

== Members of Sri Lankan parliament ==
- Ossie Abeygunasekera – Former Chairman and Leader of the Sri Lanka Mahajana Pakshaya, 1988 SLMP presidential candidate; UNP MP
- A. Amirthalingam – Former Leader of the Opposition and Leader of the Tamil United Liberation Front; TULF MP
- A. Thangathurai – TULF MP for Trincomalee District.
- Alfred Duraiappah – SLFP MP for Jaffna District and Former Mayor of Jaffna.
- M. Canagaratnam – TULF MP for Pottuvil
- A. L. Abdul Majeed – Independent (formerly SLFP) MP for Mutur
- S. Shanmuganathan – PLOTE MP for Vanni District
- Nimalan Soundaranayagam – TULF MP for Batticaloa District
- Sam Tambimuttu – EPRLF MP for Batticaloa District
- Neelan Tiruchelvam – Scholar, international activist, legislator, lawyer, social scientist and politician. TULF MP from National List
- G. Yogasangari – EPRLF MP for Jaffna District
- V. Yogeswaran – Former TULF MP for Jaffna district

== Senior military and police officers ==
- Admiral Clancy Fernando – Former Commander of the Sri Lanka Navy
- Lieutenant General Denzil Kobbekaduwa – General Officer Commanding, Northern Sector, Sri Lankan Army (Note: Other sources blame Jayamaha, Kobbekaduwa and Wimalaratne's assassinations on the Army.)
- Lieutenant General Parami Kulatunga – Deputy Chief of Staff, Sri Lankan Army
- Lieutenant Generall Nalin Angammana – General Officer Commanding, 3rd Army Division, Sri Lankan Army
- Major General Lucky Wijayaratne – Former Commander, 22 Brigade, Sri Lanka Army
- Major General Larry Wijeratne -Former Brigade Commander, 51-4 Brigade
- Major General Lakshman Algama – Former Chief of Staff of the Sri Lanka Army
- Major General Vijaya Wimalaratne – Former Commander of Jaffna, Sri Lanka Army
- Major General Percy Fernando – Former Deputy General Officer Commanding, 54 Division, Sri Lanka Army
- Major General Ananda Hamangoda – Former Brigade Commander, 51-2 Brigade, Sri Lanka Army
- Major General Susantha Mendis – Former Brigade Commander, 51-4 Brigade
- Major General Janaka Perera – Former Chief of Staff of the Sri Lanka Army, Former High Commissioner to Australia & Ambassador to Indonesia, Former opposition leader of the North Central Provincial Council
- Rear Admiral Mohan Jayamaha – Former Commander, Northern Naval Area, Sri Lanka Navy
- Air Commodore Shirantha Goonatilake – Former Commanding Officer of No. 1 Flying Training Wing, Sri Lanka Air Force
- Colonel Tuan Nizam Muthaliff – Former Commanding Officer, 1st Battalion, Military Intelligence Corps, Sri Lanka Army
- Senior Deputy Inspector General T. N. De Silva – SDIG, Colombo Range, Sri Lanka Police
- Senior Superintendent of Police Chandra Perera – Former SSP, Jaffna
- Assistant Superintendent of Police Ivan Boteju – Former Assistant Superintendent, Kalmunai, Sri Lanka Police

== Prelates ==
- Kithalagama Sri Seelalankara Thera – Chief incumbent of the Dimbulagala Raja Maha Vihara, former Chief Sangha Nayake of Northern and Eastern provinces
- Hegoda Sri Indrasara Thera – Chief incumbent of Vidyananda Maha Pirivena – Ampara, former Chief Sangha Nayake of Northern and Eastern provinces
- Sivashri Kungaraja Kurukkal – Former head pandit of the Koneswaram temple of Trincomalee
- Selliah Parameswaran Kurukkal – Chief Pujari of the Santhiveli Pilleyar Kovil, Batticaloa

== Activists and journalists ==
- Chelvy Thiyagarajah – Founder of feminist journal called Tholi, International PEN award winner in 1992
- Balanadarajah Iyer – Sri Lankan Tamil activist, writer and poet
- Kethesh Loganathan – Tamil political activist, Human Rights advocate and deputy secretary general of the Secretariat for Coordinating the Peace Process (SCOPP).
- Rajani Thiranagama – University lecturer, Tamil human rights activist and feminist
- Relangi Selvarajah – Tamil broadcaster and actress.

== Others ==
- C. E. Anandarajah – Sri Lankan educationist and former principal of St. John's College, Jaffna.
- V. M. Panchalingam – Leading Sri Lankan Tamil civil servant and former District Secretary of Jaffna
- S. Nadarajah – Sri Lankan Tamil lawyer, politician and former member of the Senate of Ceylon.
- Sarojini Yogeswaran – Former Mayor of Jaffna
- Gopalaswamy Mahendraraja – Former Deputy leader of the LTTE
- Uma Maheswaran – Founder of the People's Liberation Organisation of Tamil Eelam. (Note: The Eelam National Democratic Liberation Front, an offshoot of PLOTE, claimed responsibility for Maheswaran's assassination. Other independent sources blame Maheswaran's assassination on disgruntled members of PLOTE.)
- Kumaraswamy Nandagopan – Former president of the Tamil Makkal Viduthalai Pulikal

== Attempted assassinations ==
- Chandrika Kumaratunga – President of Sri Lanka
- Maithripala Sirisena – Future president of Sri Lanka; Minister of Health and Agriculture
- Field Marshal Sarath Fonseka – Eighteenth Commander of Sri Lankan Army
- Gotabaya Rajapaksa – Future President of Sri Lanka; Secretary of the Ministry of Defence
- Douglas Devananda – Leader of the Eelam People's Democratic Party
- Nimal Siripala de Silva – Minister of Housing

== See also ==
- List of assassinations of the Sri Lankan Civil War
