= List of assassinations of the Sri Lankan civil war =

During the Sri Lankan Civil War militant groups, paramilitary groups and government security forces were accused of assassinating many public figures on suspicion of being sympathizers or informants, in retaliation for killings and attacks, to eliminate competition from rival groups, or to stifle dissent. The following is a list of notable assassinations of the Sri Lankan Civil War, attributed by various self-admissions, NGOs, United Nations agencies, foreign governments, and the state-owned media of Sri Lanka

== Background ==
The Sri Lankan Civil War was in a conflict on the island-nation of Sri Lanka. Between 1983 and 2009 there was an intermittent civil war, predominantly between the government and the Liberation Tigers of Tamil Eelam (LTTE), a separatist militant organisation who during this time fought for the creation of an independent state named Tamil Eelam in the North and East of the island. The UN has estimated that up to 100,000 people (combatants and civilians) may have been killed during the 26 years of fighting. The civil war has caused significant harm to the population and economy of the country, as well as leading to the ban of the LTTE as a terrorist organisation in 32 countries including the United States, Australia, the countries of the European Union and Canada. The war ended in May 2009 when the Sri Lankan military defeated the LTTE. Numerous human rights violations have been committed by both the Sri Lankan military and the LTTE, including the assassination of individuals by both sides. A majority of the notable figures on this list were members of the Tamil community in Sri Lanka, and in many instances were allegedly assassinated by the LTTE for taking moderate political stances, or for rejecting militant action and attempting to engage in the democratic process in Sri Lanka.

== Assassinations ==
=== Heads of state and government ===
Victim	Position	Date	Location	Method	Perpetrator(s)
Rajiv Gandhi	Former Prime Minister of India	21 May 1991	Sriperumbudur, Tamil Nadu, India	Suicide bombing	LTTE is blamed, but they denied it until 2006. In 2006, LTTE chief negotiator Anton Balasingham said "(Rajiv Gandhi's assassination) is a great tragedy, a monumental historical tragedy for which we deeply regret".
Ranasinghe Premadasa	President of Sri Lanka	1 May 1993	Colombo	Suicide bombing	LTTE is blamed.

=== Ministers ===
Victim	Position	Date	Location	Method	Perpetrator(s)
Ranjan Wijeratne	Minister of Defence; UNP MP	2 March 1991	Colombo	Car bomb	LTTE is blamed.
Lalith Athulathmudali	Former cabinet minister; DUNF (formerly UNP) MP (Colombo District)	23 April 1993	Kirulapana, Colombo	Shot	President Premadasa was found to be directly responsible for the assassination of Lalith Athulathmudali.
Gamini Dissanayake	Former cabinet minister; UNP presidential candidate	24 October 1994	Thotalanga, Grandpass, Colombo	Suicide bombing	LTTE is blamed.
Weerasinghe Mallimarachchi	Former cabinet minister; UNP MP (Colombo District)	24 October 1994	Thotalanga, Grandpass, Colombo	Suicide bombing	LTTE is blamed.
G. M. Premachandra	Former cabinet minister; former chief minister; former UNP MP (Kurunegala District)	24 October 1994	Thotalanga, Grandpass, Colombo	Suicide bombing	LTTE is blamed.
C. V. Gunaratne	Minister of Industrial Development; SLFP MP (Colombo District)	8 June 2000	Ratmalana, Colombo	Suicide bombing	LTTE is blamed.
Lakshman Kadirgamar	Minister of Foreign Affairs; SLFP MP (National List)	12 August 2005	Colombo	Sniper	LTTE is blamed by the government and European Union, but the LTTE denied involvement in it.
D. M. Dassanayake	Nation Building Minister; SLFP MP (Puttalam District)	8 January 2008	Ja-Ela, Gampaha District	Roadside bombing	LTTE is blamed.
Jeyaraj Fernandopulle	Minister of Highways & Road Development; SLFP MP (Gampaha District)	6 April 2008	Weliveriya, Gampaha District	Suicide bombing	LTTE is blamed.

=== Members of Sri Lankan parliament ===
Victim	Position	Date	Location	Method	Perpetrator(s)
Alfred Duraiappah	Former Independent MP (Jaffna); Independent Mayor of Jaffna	27 July 1975	Jaffna	Shot	LTTE leader V. Prabhakaran himself.
M. Canagaratnam	UNP (formerly TULF) MP (Pottuvil)	20 April 1980	Colombo	Shot	Shot by Prabhakaran and Uma Maheswaran in 1978, and succumbed to his wounds in 1980.
A. Thiagarajah	Former ACTC MP (Vaddukoddai); UNP candidate; former principal, Karainagar Hindu College	24 May 1981		Shot	PLOTE and LTTE blamed.
M. Alalasundaram	Former TULF MP (Kopay)	2 September 1985	Thinnaveli, Jaffna	Shot	TELO is blamed.
V. Dharmalingam	Former TULF MP (Manipay)	2 September 1985	Manipay, Jaffna	Shot	TELO and RAW are blamed.
A. L. Abdul Majeed	Independent (formerly SLFP) MP (Muttur)	13 November 1987	Muttur, Trincomalee	Shot	LTTE is blamed.
V. Yogeswaran	Former TULF MP (Jaffna)	13 July 1989	Wijerama Mawatha, Colombo	Shot	LTTE is blamed.
A. Amirthalingam	Former Leader of the Opposition; leader of the TULF; TULF MP (National List)	13 July 1989	Wijerama Mawatha, Colombo	Shot	LTTE is blamed.
Sam Tambimuttu	EPRLF MP (Batticaloa District)	7 May 1990	Colombo	Shot	LTTE is blamed.
G. Yogasangari	EPRLF MP (Jaffna District)	19 June 1990	Kodambakam, Madras, TN, India	Grenade and gun attack	LTTE is blamed.
Ossie Abeygunasekara	UNP MP (Colombo District)	24 October 1994	Thotalanga, Grandpass, Colombo	Suicide bombing	LTTE is blamed.
Gamini Wijesekara	UNP MP; Secretary, UNP	24 October 1994	Thotalanga, Grandpass, Colombo	Suicide bombing	LTTE is blamed.
A. Thangathurai	TULF MP (Trincomalee District)	5 July 1997	Trincomalee	Grenade and gun attack	LTTE is blamed.
M. E. H. Maharoof	UNP MP (Trincomalee District)	20 July 1997	Trincomalee	Shot	LTTE is blamed by SPUR, a pro-government organisation.
S. Shanmuganathan	PLOTE MP (Vanni District)	15 July 1998	Irambaikkulam, Vavuniya District	Roadside bombing	LTTE is blamed.
Neelan Tiruchelvam	TULF MP (National List)	29 July 1999	Colombo	Suicide bombing	LTTE is blamed.
Nadarajah Atputharajah (alias Ramesh)	EPDP MP (Jaffna District); publisher of Thinamurasu newspaper	2 November 1999	Colombo	Shot	EPDP is blamed.
Kingsley Rasanayagam	TNA MP (Batticaloa District)	20 October 2000	Iruthayapuram, Batticaloa	Shot	LTTE is blamed.
Nimalan Soundaranayagam	TULF MP (Batticaloa District)	7 November 2000	Kiran, Batticaloa District	Shot	LTTE is blamed. Killed on the orders of Karuna Amman.
A. Chandranehru	Former TNA/TULF MP (Ampara District)	7 February 2005	Batticaloa District	Ambush	TMVP/Karuna Amman is blamed. Tamil National Force, a TMVP/ENDLF front, claimed responsibility.
Joseph Pararajasingham	TNA/TULF MP (Batticaloa District)	25 December 2005	Batticaloa	Shot	TMVP, EPDP and the government are blamed. The Government and the LTTE blame each other.
S. Sivamaharajah	Former TULF MP (Jaffna District); editor of Namathu Eelanadu (Our Eelam Nation) newspaper	20 August 2006	Tellippalai, Jaffna District	Shot	EPDP is blamed. The government is blamed by TNA. LTTE is blamed by SATP, a pro-government organisation.
Nadarajah Raviraj	TNA/TULF MP (Jaffna District); former Mayor of Jaffna	10 November 2006	Colombo	Shot	EPDP is blamed. TMVP and the government are blamed by the TNA. Gotabaya Rajapaksa, permanent secretary to the Ministry of Defence of the Government of Sri Lanka, was accused of involvement in the assassination by UTHR, a local human rights organisation. LTTE is blamed by the International Center for Strategic Defense.
T. Maheshwaran	UNP MP (Colombo District)	1 January 2008	Colombo	Shot	EPDP s blamed. The government is blamed by UNP. Wikileads stated that the Karuna Group was to be blamed.
K. Sivanesan	TNA MP (Jaffna District)	6 March 2008	A 9 highway, Mullaitivu District	Roadside bombing	Sri Lankan Army's LRRP is blamed.
Shantha Kumara Punchihewa	Former UNP MP (Vanni District); UNP organiser, Vavuniya District	6 October 2008	Anuradhapura	Suicide bombing	LTTE is blamed by government.

=== Provincial councillors ===
Victim	Position	Date	Location	Method	Perpetrator(s)
P. Ganeshalingam	Former EPRLF minister, North Eastern Provincial Council	28 January 1990			LTTE is blamed.
P. Kirubakaran	Former EPRLF Finance Minister, North Eastern Provincial Council	19 June 1990	Kodambakam, Madras, TN, India	Grenade and gun attack	LTTE is blamed.
P. Sooriyamoorthy	Former provincial councillor, deputy speaker, North- Eastern provincial council, Former Mayor Trincomalee district	25 May 2005	Trincomalee	Shot	LTTE blamed by the government.
Janaka Perera	UNP Leader of the Opposition, North Central Provincial Council; former Chief of Staff, Sri Lankan Army	6 October 2008	Anuradhapura	Suicide bombing	LTTE is blamed by the government.
Sunil Dissanayaka	UNP provincial councillor	6 October 2008	Anuradhapura	Suicide bombing	LTTE is blamed by the government.

=== Local councillors ===
Victim	Position	Date	Location	Method	Perpetrator(s)
K. T. Pulendran	Member of Vavuniya Urban Council, UNP organiser for Vavuniya District	19 January 1983	Vavuniya	Shot	Unknown
S. Nadarajah	Former TULF Chairman, Jaffna District Development Council	12 February 1988			LTTE is blamed.
S. Sambandamoorthy	Former TULF Chairman, Batticaloa District Development Council	7 March 1989	Chenkalady, Batticaloa District	Shot	LTTE is blamed.
T. Jeyarajah	Chairman, Chenkalady Pradeshiya Sabha	13 September 1994	Chenkalady, Batticaloa District	Shot	LTTE is blamed by the government.
Thomas Anton	Deputy Mayor of Batticaloa	26 October 1995	Batticaloa		LTTE is blamed SATP, a pro-government organisation.
Nagarmani Rajadurai	Chairman, Mandur Pradeshiya Shaba	16 April 1996	Mandur, Batticaloa	Shot	LTTE is blamed by the government.
Kandiah Amirthalingam	Vice Chairman, Vakarai Pradeshiya Sabha	29 September 1996	Oddamavadi	Shot	LTTE is blamed by the government.
Sarojini Yogeswaran	TULF Mayor of Jaffna	17 May 1998	Jaffna	Shot	LTTE is blamed. Sankiliyan Force, suspected to be a front organisation for the LTTE, has claimed responsibility.
Pon Sivapalan	TULF Mayor of Jaffna	11 September 1998	Jaffna	Claymore bomb attack	LTTE is blamed.
P. Kandasamy	Member of Pradeshiya Sabha	14 February 1999	Avarankal	Shot	LTTE is blamed by the government.
Veerahaththy Gunaratnam	PLOTE Member, Pachchilaipalli Pradheshiya Sabha	5 May 1999	Vavuniya	Shot	Unknown
M. Balasingham	Member of Pradeshiya Sabha	12 May 1999	Urumpirai, Jaffna	Shot	LTTE is blamed by the government.
T. Rajkumar	Member of Pradeshiya Sabha	31 May 1999	Kandaramadam	Shot	LTTE is blamed by the government.
Murugesu Gunaratnam (alias Vino)	Former PLOTE Deputy Chairman, Kaluvanchikudi Pradeshiya Sabha; public relations officer	2 September 1999	Vavuniya	Bomb	LTTE is blamed.
Vadivelu Vijeyaratnam (alias Sellakili Master)	PLOTE Chairman, Point Pedro Urban Council	14 January 2000	Point Pedro, Jaffna District	Shot	Unknown
Chelian Perinpanayagam	Former Mayor of Batticaloa, writer, journalist	10 September 2000	Eastern Kalmunai	Shot	LTTE is blamed by UTHR, a local human right organisation.

=== Other politicians ===
Victim	Position	Date	Location	Method	Perpetrator(s)
S. J. Muttiah	UNP candidate, Chavakacheri	29 April 1983	Chavakacheri, Jaffna	Shot	LTTE is blamed by the government.
S. Rajaratnam	UNP candidate, Valvettithurai	29 April 1983	Valvettithurai, Jaffna	Shot	LTTE is blamed by the government.
K. B. Ratnasingham	UNP candidate, Point Pedro	29 April 1983	Point Pedro, Jaffna District	Shot	LTTE is blamed by the government.
Canagasabai Rajathurai	EPDP Member		Jaffna	Shot	Unknown
A. J. Rajasooriar	UNP organiser, Jaffna District	12 August 1983	Jaffna District	Shot	Unknown
Velamurugu Master	TULF organiser; Member, Kalmunai Citizens Committee	20 August 1983	Kalmunai	Shot	Unknown
Mala Ramachandran	UNP member, Batticaloa Municipal Council	1 September 1983	Batticaloa	Shot	Unknown
S. Gopallapillai	UNP candidate	18 September 1983	Jaffna	Shot	LTTE is blamed by the government.
S. Vidyanandan	District Secretary, Communist Party	8 March 1988	Chunnakam, Jaffna District	Shot	Unknown
Karavai Kandasamy	Deputy chairman, DPLF	31 December 1994	Robert Place, Colombo	Shot	LTTE is blamed by the government.
K. Vinothan	Former SLFP organiser, Jaffna District	28 April 1995	Sea Avenue, Colombo	Shot	LTTE is blamed by the government.
S. T. Tharmalingam	SLFP organiser, Jaffna District	3 October 1997	Columbuthurai, Jaffna District	Shot	Unknown
S. A. Oswald	SLFP Secretary, Gurunagar	24 June 1998	Gurunagar, Jaffna	Shot	LTTE is blamed by the government.
Pon Mathimukarajah (Mathimugaraj)	General Secretary, TULF Nallur Branch	26 December 1998	Nallur, Jaffna District	Shot	Unknown
Lakshman Algama	UNP politician; Former Chief of Staff, Sri Lankan Army	18 December 1999	Ja-Ela, Gampaha District	Suicide bombing	LTTE is blamed by the government.
Kumar Ponnambalam	Leader of the ACTC; lawyer	5 January 2000	Colombo	Shot	Government is blamed by his family.National Front Against Terrorism has claimed responsibility.
Anton Sivalingam	EPDP Member	1 March 2000	Jaffna	Shot	LTTE is blamed by the government.
Kanapathipillai Navaratnarajah	TELO member	7 June 2000	Batticaloa	Shot	LTTE is blamed.
Rajan Sathiyamoorthy	TNA parliamentary candidate	30 March 2004	Batticaloa	Shot	LTTE is blamed.
Vanniasingham Vigneswaran	TNA member; President, Trincomalee District Tamil Peoples' Forum	7 April 2006	Trincomalee	Shot	TMVP is blamed.
John Pulle	UNP organiser, Anuradhapura District; former Sri Lankan Ambassador	6 October 2008	Anuradhapura	Suicide bombing	LTTE is blamed by the government.
Kumaraswamy Nandagopan (alias Ragu)	President, TMVP	14 November 2008	Colombo District	Shot	LTTE is blamed by the government.

=== Military officers ===
Victim	Position	Date	Location	Method	Perpetrator(s)
Major General Lucky Wijayaratne	Commander, 22 Brigade	18 December 1990	Trincomalee District	Land mine	LTTE is blamed.
Rear Admiral Mohan Jayamaha	Commander, Northern Naval Area	8 August 1992	Kayts, Jaffna District	Land mine	LTTE is blamed. Involvement of Sri Lankan President Ranasinghe Premadasa is speculated.
Lt. General Denzil Kobbekaduwa	General Officer Commanding, Northern Sector	8 August 1992	Kayts, Jaffna District	Land mine	LTTE is blamed. Involvement of Sri Lankan President Ranasinghe Premadasa is speculated.
Major General Vijaya Wimalaratne	Commander, Jaffna Brigade	8 August 1992	Kayts, Jaffna District	Land mine	LTTE is blamed. Involvement of Sri Lankan President Ranasinghe Premadasa is speculated.
Admiral Clancy Fernando	Commander of the Sri Lanka Navy	16 November 1992	Colombo	Suicide bombing	LTTE is blamed. He is the senior most military officer killed by the LTTE.
Lt. General Nalin Angammana	General Officer Commanding, 3rd Army Division, Sri Lankan Army	30 July 1995	Batticaloa	Land mine	LTTE is blamed.
Major General Ananda Hamangoda	Brigade Commander, 51-2 Brigade	4 July 1996	Jaffna	Suicide bombing	LTTE is blamed.
Major General Larry Wijeratne	Brigade Commander, 51-4 Brigade	14 May 1998	Jaffna	Suicide bombing	LTTE is blamed.
Major General Susantha Mendis	Brigade Commander, 51-4 Brigade	11 September 1998	Jaffna	Bombing	LTTE is blamed
Major General Percy Fernando	Deputy General Officer Commanding, 54 Division	20 April 2000	Elephant Pass, Kilinochchi District	Sniper	LTTE is blamed.
Colonel Tuan Nizam Muthaliff	Commanding Officer, 1st Battalion, Military Intelligence Corps	31 May 2005	Colombo	Shot	LTTE is blamed.
Lt. General Parami Kulatunga	Deputy Chief of Staff, Sri Lankan Army	26 June 2006	Colombo	Suicide bombing	LTTE is blamed.

=== Police officers ===
Victim	Position	Date	Location	Method	Perpetrator(s)
Kandiah Karunanithy	PC3164 CID, Kankesanthurai police	14 February 1977	Maviddapuram	Shot	Prabhakaran, Sellakili, Charles Anthony – LTTE is blamed. He is the first police officer to be murdered by Tamil militants.
IP T. I. Bastiampillai	Inspector of Police, CID	7 April 1978	Mannar	Shot along with his police team	Lt. Sellakili, a former bodyguard of Prabhakaran.
ASP Ivan Boteju	Assistant Superintendent of Police, Kalmunai	June 1990	Ampara District	Shot	LTTE is blamed.
DIG Richard Wijesekara	Superintendent of Police, Trincomalee	1991	Trincomalee	landmine	LTTE is blamed.
SSP Chandra Perera	Superintendent of Police, Jaffna	11 September 1998	Jaffna	Bombing at Mayor's office	LTTE is blamed.
SDIG T. N. De Silva	SDIG, Colombo Range	18 December 1999	Colombo	Bomb blast targeting President Chandrika Kumaratunga	LTTE is blamed.
ASP E. M. H. B Ekanayake	Asst. Superintendent of Police (Posthumous), Colombo 03	2004	Colombo	Bombing at Kollupitiya Police Station targeting EPDP Leader Douglas Devananda	LTTE is blamed.
DIG Charles Wijewardene	Superintendent of Police, Jaffna	5 August 2005	Jaffna	Shot	LTTE is blamed.
DIG Upul Seneviratne	Director of Training, Special Task Force	7 August 2006	Digana, Kandy	Roadside bombing	LTTE is blamed.

=== Civil servants ===
Victim	Position	Date	Location	Method	Perpetrator(s)
V. M. Panchalingam	District Secretary/Government Agent, Jaffna District	1 May 1989	Nallur, Jaffna District	Shot	LTTE is blamed by SPUR, a pro-government organisation.
Markandu Eswaram	Chief Engineer	11 September 1998	Nallur, Jaffna District	Bombing at Mayor's office	LTTE is blamed by SPUR, a pro-government organisation.
T. Kailainathan	Director of Vocational Qualification	4 April 2005			LTTE is blamed by UTHR, a local human right organisation.
A. L. M. Faleel	Divisional Secretary/Assistant Government Agent, Kattankudy, Batticaloa District	4 December 2005	Batticaloa	Shot	LTTE is blamed.
Pon. Ganeshamoorthy	General Manager, People's Bank; literary figure; poet	4 August 2006	Kankesanthurai, Jaffna District	Shot	Sri Lanka military intelligence is blamed.
Ketheesh Loganathan	Co-founder, Centre for Policy Alternatives; Deputy Leader, Government Peace Secretariat	12 August 2006	Colombo	Shot	LTTE is blamed. Loganathan was called a traitor by nitharsanam.com, a website allegedly run by the LTTE.
Q. Anantharajan	Grama Service Officer; Political Science Lecturer	30 November 2006	Jaffna	Shot	LTTE
Herath Abeyweera	Chief Secretary, Eastern Provincial Council	16 July 2007	Trincomalee	Shot	LTTE is blamed.
N. Nanthakumar	Divisional Secretary/Assistant Government Agent, Thunukkai, Mullaitivu District	29 June 2008	Mullaitivu	Claymore bomb attack	Sri Lankan Army's LRRP is blamed.
Samanturai Anthonimuttu	District Secretary/Government Agent, Batticaloa District		Batticaloa	Shot	LTTE is blamed by the SPUR, a pro-government organisation.
S. S. Jeganathan	Divisional Secretary/Assistant Government Agent, Batticaloa District		Batticaloa	Shot	LTTE is blamed by the SPUR, a pro-government organisation.
Rajshankar	President, Thenmarachchi Citizens Cimmittee		Thenmarachchi, Jaffna District	Shot	LTTE is blamed by the SPUR, a pro-government organisation.
Sinnadurai	Divisional Secretary/Assistant Government Agent, Trincomalee District		Trincomalee	Shot	LTTE is blamed by the SPUR, a pro-government organisation.
B. K. Thambipillai	President, Citizens Cimmittee			Shot	LTTE is blamed by the SPUR, a pro-government organisation.
Vignarajah	Sarvodaya Leader; District Secretary/Government Agent			Shot	LTTE is blamed by the SPUR, a pro-government organisation.

=== Journalists ===
Victim	Position	Date	Location	Method	Perpetrator(s)
I. Shanmugalingam	Staff Reporter, Eelanadu and Eelamurasu newspapers	6 November 1989	Jaffna	Kidnapped and executed	LTTE informed family that they killed him three days later.
Richard de Zoysa	Author; journalist	18 February 1990	Welikadawatte, Colombo	Shot	Senior Superintendent of Police Ronnie Gunasinghe and other police officers are involved on the orders of President Ranasinghe Premadasa.
K. S. Raja	Reporter, Radio Ceylon	3 September 1994	Colombo	Shot	EPDP is blamed.
Chelvy Thiyagarajah	Founder, Tholi	1997	Jaffna	Kidnapped and executed	LTTE is blamed.
Mylvaganam Nimalarajan	Reporter, BBC	19 October 2000	Jaffna	Shot	EPDP is blamed.
Aiyathurai Nadesan	Reporter, Virakesari	31 May 2004	Batticaloa	Shot	TMVP is blamed by Human Rights Watch.
Balanadarajah Iyer	Lead editor, EPDP; founder, Thinamurasu newspaper	16 August 2004	Colombo	Shot	LTTE is blamed.
Taraki Sivaram	Editor, TamilNet	28 April 2005	Colombo District	Shot	TMVP is blamed.
Relangi Selvarajah	TV announcer; freelance producer	12 August 2005	Colombo	Shot	LTTE is blamed.
Subramaniyam Sugirdharajan	Correspondent, Sudar Oli	24 January 2006	Trincomalee	Shot	Unknown gunmen.
Ranjith Kumar	Journalist, Uthayan	2 May 2006	Jaffna	Shot	EPDP is blamed.
Suresh Kumar	Journalist, Uthayan	2 May 2006	Jaffna	Shot	EPDP is blamed.
Sampath Lakmal de Silva	Freelance journalist	2 July 2006	Dehiwela, Colombo District	Shot	Sri Lankan Army is blamed.
Chandrabose Suthaharan	Editor, Nilam magazine	16 April 2007	Thirunavatkulam, Vavuniya District	Shot	Killers reportedly spoke both Sinhala and Tamil.
Selvarajah Rajivarnam	Reporter, Uthayan	29 April 2007	Jaffna	Shot	EPDP is blamed.
Sahathevan Nilakshan	Journalist, Chaalaram	1 August 2007	Kokkuvil, Jaffna District	Shot	
P. Devakumaran	Journalist, Shakthi TV	28 May 2008	Navanthurai, Jaffna District	Hacked to death	EPDP is blamed.
Lasantha Wickramatunge	Editor-in-chief, The Sunday Leader	8 January 2009	Colombo	Shot	Government was blamed by Wickramatunge in a posthumous editorial.

=== Academics ===
Victim	Position	Date	Location	Method	Perpetrator(s)
C. E. Anandarajah	Principal, St. John's College, Jaffna	26 June 1985	Jaffna	Shot	LTTE claimed responsibility and provided reasons in a public notice (he was killed for organizing a game between the students and the Sri Lankan forces).
M. E. Kandasamy	Principal, Palugamam Maha Vidyalaya		Batticaloa	Shot	Unknown
S. Siththamparanathan	Principal, Vigneswara Vidyalaya, Trincomalee	31 January 1988	Trincomalee	Shot	Unknown
Ponniah Selvarajah aka Pon Selvarajah	Teacher; Village Officer	3 September 1988	Poonari Madam, Kokkuvil, Jaffna District	Shot	From Punnalaikkadduvan North, Jaffna
Rajani Thiranagama	University teacher; political activist; human rights activist	25 September 1989	Thirunelveli, Jaffna District	Shot	LTTE is blamed.
Nadarajah Sivakadatcham	Principal, Kopay Christian College	11 October 2006	Jaffna	Shot	EPDP is blamed.
Kanapathy Rajadurai	Principal, Jaffna Central College	12 October 2006	Jaffna	Shot	LTTE is blamed.

=== Religious figures ===
Victim	Position	Date	Location	Method	Perpetrator(s)
Father George Jeyarajasingham	Methodist priest; human rights activist	13 December 1984	Mannar District	Shot	Sri Lankan Army is blamed.
Father Mary Bastian	Catholic priest; human rights activist	6 January 1985	Vankalai, Mannar District	Shot	Sri Lankan security forces are blamed.
Venerable Bakamune Subaddalanakara Thero	Buddhist priest	4 June 1986	Andankulam, Trincomalee District	shot	LTTE is blamed by the government.
Venerable Hegoda Sri Indrasara	Chief Incumbent (Priest), Vidyananda Maha Pirivena	2 June 1987	Arantalawa, Ampara District	Shot/hacked	LTTE is blamed.
Father Chandra Fernando	Catholic priest; human rights activist	6 June 1988	Batticaloa	Shot	EPRLF is blamed. PLOTE is blamed by TamilNet.
Most Venerable Matara Kithalagama Sri Seelalankara Nayaka Thero aka Dimbulagala Hamuduruwo	Buddhist priest; Chief Incumbent (Priest), Dimbulagala Temple, Polonnaruwa District	26 May 1995	Dimbulagala	Shot	LTTE is blamed.
Father Thiruchelvam Nihal Jim Brown	Catholic priest	2006	Allaippiddi, Jaffna District	Disappeared and found dead	Sri Lankan Navy is blamed.
Venerable Selliah Parameswaran Kurukkal	Hindu priest; Chief Priest, Santhiveli Pilleyar Kovil, Batticaloa	11 February 2007	Batticaloa	Shot	LTTE is blamed. Ven. Selliah Parameswaran Kurukkal was the Hindu priest who garlanded and welcomed Sri Lankan President Mahinda Rajapaksa during his visit to the Vaharai area after it was captured from the Tamil Tigers.
Venerable Hadungamuwe Nandarathene	Chief Incumbent (Priest), Sri Pabbattharamaya Temple, Mahadivulwewa-Stage 1, Morawewa	14 May 2007	Morawewa	Shot	LTTE is blamed.
Father Nicholas Pillai Pakiaranjith	Catholic priest; aid worker	26 September 2007	Kalvilaan, Mannar District	Roadside bombing	Sri Lankan Army's LRRP is blamed.
Father M. X. Karunaratnam	North East Secretariat on Human Rights (NESoHR)	20 April 2008	Mannankulam	Claymore attack	Sri Lankan Army's LRRP is blamed.
Venerable Sivashri Kungaraja Kurukkal	Hindu priest; Chief Priest, Koneswaram Temple, Trincomalee	21 September 2008		Shot	LTTE is blamed.

=== Militants ===
Victim	Position	Date	Location	Method	Perpetrator(s)
Oberoi Thevan	Founder and leader, Tamil Eelam Liberation Army (TELA)	14 August 1983		Shot	LTTE cadres on the orders of Prabhakaran.
Sri Sabaratnam	Leader, TELO	5 May 1986	Jaffna Peninsula	Shot	Kittu (Sathasivam Krishnakumar) of the LTTE.
Uma Maheswaran	Leader, PLOTE	16 July 1989	Colombo	Shot	ENDLF claimed responsibility. Indian intelligence agency (RAW) involvement is speculated.
K. Pathmanabha (alias Ranjan)	General Secretary, EPRLF	19 June 1990	Kodambakam, Madras, TN, India	Grenade and gun attack	LTTE is blamed.
G. Mahendraraja (alias Mahattaya)	LTTE	8 December 1994		Shot	LTTE.
Muthulingam Ganeshkumar (alias Razeek)	Leader, Razeek Group	29 May 1999	Batticaloa	Shot	LTTE is blamed by the government.
P. Ganeshmoorthy (alias Razeek)	Military Leader, EPRLF	29 May 1999	Eravur, Batticaloa District	Bomb	LTTE is blamed.
Tharmalingam Thevarasa (alias Ilango)	Military Commander, Vavuniya, PLOTE	2 September 1999	Vavuniya	Bomb	LTTE is blamed.
Nagalingam Manikkam Rajan (Manickathasan) (alias Thasan)	Deputy Leader & Military Wing Commander, PLOTE	2 September 1999	Vavuniya	Bomb	LTTE is blamed.
Lt. Col. Gangai Amaran	Deputy Leader, Sea Tigers, LTTE	2001	Akkaraayan Kulam, Kilinochchi District	Claymore attack	Sri Lankan Army's LRRP.
T. Kuhasanthan (alias Lt. Col. Nizam)	Military Intelligence Wing leader for the East, LTTE	2001			Sri Lankan Army's LRRP is blamed.
Major Mano	Head of Eastern Communication, LTTE	2001	Batticaloa	Claymore attack	Sri Lankan Army's LRRP.
V. Sornalingam (alias Colonel Shankar)	Second in command, LTTE	26 September 2001	Oddusuddan, Mullaitivu District	Claymore attack	Sri Lankan Army's LRRP.
Kandiah Subathiran Thambirajah (alias Robert)	Jaffna District leader, EPRLF (Varathar wing)	14 June 2003	Jaffna	Shot	LTTE is blamed.
Kandaiah Yogarajah (alias PLOTE Mohan)	Senior member, PLOTE	31 July 2004	Colombo	Shot	LTTE is blamed.
P. Rajaratnam (alias Mano Master)	General Secretary, ENDLF	21 November 2004?	Colombo?		LTTE is blamed by ENDLF.
Sonnyboy Occersz (alias Rangappa)	Senior member, ENDLF	25 November 2004	Dematagoda, Colombo	Shot	LTTE is blamed.
E. Kousalyan	Political wing regional leader, LTTE	7 February 2005	Batticaloa District	Ambush	TMVP/Karuna is blamed. Tamil National Force, a TMVP/ENDLF front, claimed responsibility.
Sivaguru Navaratnarajah (alias Kanthy)	Leader, EPRLF (Razeek Group)	14 September 2005	Batticaloa	Grenade attack	LTTE is blamed.
K. Ulaganathan (alias Colonel Ramanan)	Military leader, Batticaloa District, LTTE	21 May 2006	Vavunathiv, Batticaloa District	Sniper	Sri Lankan Army/TMVP.
S. P. Thamilselvan	Political leader, LTTE	2 November 2007	Kilinochchi District	Air strike	Sri Lankan Air Force
S. Ravishankar (alias Colonel Charles)	Head of Military Intelligence, LTTE	6 January 2008	Pallamadu, Mannar District	Roadside bombing	Sri Lankan Army's LRRP.
S. Sivashankar (alias Pottu Amman)	Head of Tiger organisation Security Intelligence Service (TOSIS), LTTE	18 May 2009	Mullaitivu District		Sri Lankan Army. Body was not found.
Velupillai Prabhakaran	Founder and leader, LTTE	18 May 2009	Nanthi Lagoon, Mullaitivu District	Gunfire	53 Division, Sri Lankan Army.

=== Others ===
Victim	Position	Date	Location	Method	Perpetrator(s)
Chasy Krishnamoorthy	Writer; film critic				
Sathasivam Baskaran	Distributor for the Tamil newspaper Uthayan from Jaffna, Sri Lanka	15 August 2006	Puttur junction near Achchuveli	Shot	
Maheswary Velautham	Lawyer; human rights activist	13 May 2008	Navindil, Jaffna District	Shot	LTTE is blamed.

== Attempted assassinations ==
=== Heads of state and government ===
Victim	Position	Date	Location	Method	Perpetrator(s)
Chandrika Kumaratunga	President of Sri Lanka	18 December 1999	Town Hall, Colombo	Suicide bombing	LTTE is blamed.

=== Ministers ===
Victim	Position	Date	Location	Method	Perpetrator(s)
Douglas Devananda	Minister	Multiple times	Multiple locations		LTTE is blamed for most attempts.
Nimal Siripala de Silva	Minister of Housing	4 July 1996	Jaffna, Jaffna District	Suicide bombing	LTTE is blamed.
General Anuruddha Ratwatte	Minister of Energy and Deputy Defence Minister	6 December 1998	Oddusuddan, Mullaitivu District	Mortar attack	LTTE is blamed
Maithripala Sirisena	Minister of Agricultural Development & Agrarian Services	8 October 2008	Piliyandala, Colombo District	Suicide bombing	LTTE is blamed.
Mahinda Yapa Abeywardena	Minister of Cultural Affairs	11 March 2009	Akuressa, Matara District	Suicide bombing	LTTE is blamed.
Ali Ameer	Non-Cabinet Minister of Disaster Relief Services	11 March 2009	Akuressa, Matara District	Suicide bombing	LTTE is blamed.
Pandu Bandaranaike	Non-Cabinet Minister of Religious Affairs	11 March 2009	Akuressa, Matara District	Suicide bombing	LTTE is blamed.
A. H. M. Fowzie	Minister of Petroleum & Petroleum Resources Development	11 March 2009	Akuressa, Matara District	Suicide bombing	LTTE is blamed.
Chandrasiri Gajadeera	Non-Cabinet Minister of Home Affairs	11 March 2009	Akuressa, Matara District	Suicide bombing	LTTE is blamed.
Mahinda Wijesekara	Minister of Special Projects	11 March 2009	Akuressa, Matara District	Suicide bombing	LTTE is blamed.

=== Public officials ===
Victim	Position	Date	Location	Method	Perpetrator(s)
Gotabaya Rajapaksa	Secretary, Ministry of Defence	1 December 2006	Kollupitiya, Colombo District	Suicide bombing	LTTE is blamed.

=== Military officers ===
Victim	Position	Date	Location	Method	Perpetrator(s)
Lt. General Sarath Fonseka	Commander of the Army	25 April 2006	Army Headquarters, Colombo	Suicide bombing	LTTE is blamed.

=== Diplomats ===
Victim	Position	Date	Location	Method	Perpetrator(s)
Colonel Bashir Wali Mohammed	Pakistani High Commissioner to Sri Lanka	14 August 2006	Kollupitiya, Colombo	Bombing	LTTE is blamed by the government. Bashir Wali Mohammed has blamed the Research and Analysis Wing, the Indian intelligence agency, for the attack.
Robert O. Blake, Jr.	United States Ambassador to Sri Lanka and the Maldives	February 2007	SLAF Batticaloa, Batticaloa	Mortar attack	LTTE is blamed but they denied targeting Blake and Mariani.
Pio Mariani	Italian Ambassador to Sri Lanka	February 2007	SLAF Batticaloa, Batticaloa	Mortar attack	LTTE is blamed but they denied targeting Blake and Mariani.

== See also ==
- List of assassinations of the Second JVP Insurrection
- List of attacks attributed to the LTTE
- List of attacks attributed to the Sri Lankan military
- List of people assassinated by the Liberation Tigers of Tamil Eelam
