= Charles (Tamil militant) =

Sri Lankan Tamil militant

Colonel Charles
- கேணல் சாள்ஸ்
- Born: S. Ravishankar
- Died: 5 January 2008; Mannar District
- Other name: Arulventhan
- Years active: 1985–2008
- Organization: Liberation Tigers of Tamil Eelam
- Military service
- Allegiance: Tamil Eelam
- Branch: Liberation Tigers of Tamil Eelam
- Service years: 1985-2008
- Commands: Head of LTTE Military Intelligence
- Conflicts: Sri Lankan Civil War: Eelam War I, between 1985 and 1987; Indian intervention in the Sri Lankan Civil War, between 1987 and 1990; Eelam War II, between 1990 and 1995; Eelam War III, between 1995 and 2002; Eelam War IV, between 2006 and 2008

Shanmuganathan Ravishankar (Tamil: ஷண்முகநாதன் ரவிஶங்கர Caṇmukanātaṉ Ravicaṅkara; died 5 January 2008; commonly known by the nom de guerre Charles) was a leading member of the TOSIS, the intelligence wing of Liberation Tigers of Tamil Eelam (LTTE), a separatist Tamil militant organisation in Sri Lanka.

Ravishankar was from Point Pedro. He joined the LTTE in December 1985, whilst still at school, and took on the nom de guerre Charles. His first duty was to be a sentry near Point Pedro army camp after school. He abandoned his education in 1987. He then worked in a shop run by the LTTE. Charles' first armed combat was in May 1987 during the Vadamarachchi Operation (Operation Liberation) in which the Sri Lankan military recaptured most of Vadamarachchi. He took part in the LTTE's retaliatory attack on the army camp at Nelliady Central College on 5 July 1987.

Charles then served under Captain Morris, the LTTE's commander for Point Pedro, taking part in operations against the Indian Peace Keeping Force (IPKF). Charles then served in Manal Aru before returning to Jaffna Peninsula. He was the LTTE's commander for Vadamarachchi when the IPKF withdrew to India in 1990.

Charles was introduced to the LTTE's intelligence head Pottu Amman by his body guard Kili. Pottu Amman chose Charles to prepare a base in southern Sri Lanka for attacks. Charles and some other intelligence operatives were sent to Colombo in early 1990. He returned to the north after war broke out again between the LTTE and the Sri Lankan military in June 1990. The LTTE then received intelligence that Deputy Defence Minister Ranjan Wijeratne and the Joint Operations Command were planning to assassinate LTTE leader V. Prabhakaran as he and his wife Mathivathani were praying at the Nallur Kandaswamy temple in Jaffna. Charles was sent back to Colombo in January 1991 to deliver the LTTE's response to the assassination plot. Wijeratne was assassinated on 2 March 1991 and the Joint Operations Command building was blown up on 22 June 1991. Charles is alleged to have taken part in both attacks. He is also alleged to have taken part in the assassinations of Clancy Fernando (16 November 1992); Lalith Athulathmudali (23 April 1993); President Ranasinghe Premadasa (1 May 1993); and Gamini Dissanayake, Ossie Abeygunasekera, Weerasinghe Mallimarachchi, G. M. Premachandra and Gamini Wijesekara (24 October 1994). He is also alleged to have taken part in the attacks on the Kolonnawa fuel storage complex (20 October 1995) and Kelanithissa power plant (14 November 1997). Charles is alleged to have masterminded the Central Bank bombing on 31 January 1996. Prabhakaran is alleged to have given Charles a Mitsubishi Pajero as a reward for the Central Bank attack. By now, Charles had earned a fearsome reputation as TOSIS' deadliest field agent.

After the Sri Lankan authorities became aware of his presence in Colombo, Charles moved to the East, serving as the LTTE's intelligence head in Batticaloa-Ampara between 1997 and 2000. During this time he is alleged to have masterminded the assassinations of Neelan Tiruchelvam (29 July 1999); Lucky Algama (8 December 1999); and C. V. Gunaratne (7 June 2000). He is also believed to have been behind the unsuccessful assassination attempt on President Chandrika Kumaratunga on 18 December 1999. He led the successful commando raid on Bandaranaike International Airport on 24 July 2001, which caused damage to SLAF and to the airport.

After the 2002 ceasefire Charles started expanding the LTTE's intelligence network in the Colombo region, particularly Sinhalese members of the police and armed forces. He is also worked to eliminate members of Tamil paramilitary groups and Tamils spying for the Sri Lankan authorities. In 2004 he was made head of the newly created Military Intelligence Wing of the LTTE. He is alleged to have been behind the Habarana bombing (16 October 2006) and attack on Galle Harbour (18 October 2006). He took part in gathering intelligence about the Anuradhapura air base prior to it being attacked on 22 October 2007. He was later placed in charge of all external operations and made commander of a special combat unit in Mannar District.

== Death ==
In early 2008 Charles was assisting Sea Tigers leader Soosai fortify the Sea Tiger base at Vidattaltivu, Mannar District. Lieutenant Colonel Charles and three other LTTE members were killed on 5 January 2008 by a claymore mine placed by the Army's Deep Penetration Unit (LRRP) as they travelled in van between Iluppaikkadavai and Pallamadu in Mannar District. There were conflicting reports about his age - the Sri Lankan military claimed he was 35 whilst others reported that he was 43. His remains were buried in the LTTE's heroes cemetery at Kanakapuram, Kilinochchi District.
