= List of attacks attributed to the LTTE, 1970s =

The following is a list of chronological attacks attributed to the LTTE in 1970s related to the Sri Lankan Civil War. The deadliest attacks for the decade were in 1979.

== Attacks in chronological order ==
=== 1972 ===
| Date | Attack | Location | Sinhalese | Tamils | Muslims | Death toll | Sources |
|---|---|---|---|---|---|---|---|
| September 17 | A carnival held at the Duraiappah Stadium is bombed by the Tamil New Tigers. | Jaffna, Jaffna District | | unknown | | | |

=== 1974 ===
- Throughout 1974, the Tamil New Tigers and other Tamil rebel groups launched several bomb attacks targeting the Mayor of Jaffna and Jaffna civilians.

These include:

- hands bombs lobbied into a jeep at the Kankesanturai Police Station
- dynamite ignited at the home of V. Ponnampalam, a member of the Communist Party
- dynamite thrown into Chenkathanai Railway Station causing extensive damage
- bombs exploded in the Grand Bazar, Jaffna
- CTB buses set on fire

=== 1975 ===
| Date | Attack | Location | Sinhalese | Tamils | Muslims | Death toll | Sources |
|---|---|---|---|---|---|---|---|
| July 27 | Mayor of Jaffna Alfred Duraiappah is shot to death by LTTE leader Velupillai Prabhakaran in the first major attack by the group. | Jaffna, Jaffna District | | 1 | | 1 | |

=== 1976 ===
1976, saw a series of brazen robberies committed by the LTTE.

In March 1976, LTTE members robbed the People's Bank at Puttur of Rs. 668,000 in cash and jewellery. This was followed by raids on Multi-Purpose Co-Operative Services in Puloly and Madagal.

=== 1977 ===
| Date | Attack | Location | Sinhalese | Tamils | Muslims | Death toll | Sources |
|---|---|---|---|---|---|---|---|
| February 14 | PC Karunandhi is shot to death for investigating crimes committed by the LTTE. | Maviddapuram, Jaffna District | | 1 | | 1 | |
| May 18 | Two officers named Shanmuganathan are killed for the same reason | Inuvil, Jaffna District | | 2 | | 2 | |

=== 1978 ===
| Date | Attack | Location | Sinhalese | Tamils | Muslims | Death toll | Sources |
|---|---|---|---|---|---|---|---|
| January 24 | M. Canagaratnam is shot in the head by Uma Maheswaran and other LTTE members for switching party affliction from the TULF to the UNP. | Kollupitiya, Colombo District | | 1 | | | |
| April 7 | Inspector Bastianpillai and Sub-Inspector Perampalan are shot to death along with their chauffeur while chasing down Maheshawan. Bastianpillai's body is then mutilated and their car is set on fire after its radio equipment is taken. | Murunkan, Mannar District | | 3 | | 3 | |
| May | Inspector Pathmanathan is killed in his home. | Jaffna, Jaffna District | | 1 | | 1 | |
| June | Inspector Kumaru is killed while shopping. | Valvettithurai, Jaffna District | | 1 | | 1 | |
| December 5 | Police Constable Kingsley Perera and Satchithanadan are shot to death during a raid on the People's Bank at Nallur. The LTTE robbed the bank of over 1 million rupees in cash. | Nallur, Jaffna District | 1 | 1 | | 2 | |

- In July, 4 robberies are carried out.
  - 2 from CTB buses
  - 1 from a van
  - Rs. 15,000 from a travelling salesman
- In September a CTB bus is set on fire.
- Later schoolteacher salaries were robbed in Point Pedro.
- On September 7, 1978 a bomb is planted on an Air Ceylon plane flying from Kankesanturai to Colombo. It exploded after landing while in the hangar.
- Some time later the Kopai Multi-Purpose Co-Operative Society was robbed of Rs. 30,000 using a stolen vehicle. The owner of the vehicle was thrown into his luggage compartment.

=== 1979 ===
| Date | Attack | Location | Sinhalese | Tamils | Muslims | Death toll | Sources |
|---|---|---|---|---|---|---|---|
| | S. A. Emmanuel of Chankanai, Thaadi Thangarajah of Kondavil, A. Krishnagol of Velvettiturai, T. Poopalasingham of Chunnakam and A. Sivarajah of Thondamannar are executed by the LTTE for providing evidence against them to the police. | Jaffna District | | 5 | | 5 | |
| | PC Gnanasambandan, PC Sivanesan, Inspector Guruswamy, S. Swarnarajah and his wife are executed by the LTTE. | Jaffna District | | 5 | | 5 | |

== See also ==
- List of (non-state) terrorist incidents
