= M. M. Mustapha =

Sri Lankan lawyer and politician (1924–2000)

Hon. M. M. Mustapha

Deputy Minister of Justice
- In office 1970–1975

Parliamentary Secretary to the Minister of Social Services
- In office 1965–1970

Member of the Ceylon Parliament for Pottuvil
- In office 1956–1960
- Preceded by: M. M. Ebrahim
- Succeeded by: M. A. Abdul Majeed

Member of the Ceylon Parliament for Nintavur
- In office 1965–1977
- Preceded by: M. I. M. Abdul Majeed
- Succeeded by: M. A. Abdul Majeed

Personal details
- Born: 16 July 1924 Nintavur, Ceylon
- Died: 3 October 2000 (aged 76)
- Party: United National Party
- Relations: Meeralebbe Podi Vanniar (father), Meera Ummah (mother)
- Education: Batticaloa Methodist Central College, Ceylon Law College
- Occupation: Lawyer, politician

Al-Haj Meeralebbe Poddy Mohamed Mustapha (10 July 1924 – 3 October 2000) was a Sri Lankan lawyer and politician.

Meeralebbe Poddy Mohamed Mustapha was born in Nintavur on 16 July 1924, the son of Meeralebbe Podi Vanniar and Meera Ummah. He received his early education in Nintavur, before attending Batticaloa Methodist Central College. Following which he graduated from the Ceylon Law College as an advocate. Mustapha then passed the Inter-Law Exam at the London University.

In 1948 he began practicing law in Batticaloa.

Mustapha married the eldest daughter of Gate Mudaliyar Mohammed Samsudeen Kariapper, the chairman of Kalmunai Town Council and the member for Kalmunai.

He first ran for parliament at the 1952 Ceylonese parliamentary election in the Pottuvil electorate, held in May 1952, running as the Illankai Tamil Arasu Kachchi (Federal Party) candidate. He was narrowly defeated by the sitting member, Meerakuddy Mohamed Ebrahim, with a margin of 559 votes.

At the 3rd parliamentary election, held in April 1956, Ebrahim chose not to run due to poor health and Mustapha was successful in securing the seat for the Federal Party, receiving 8,355 votes (51.8% of the total vote) defeating his nearest opponent, M. I. M. Abdul Majeed, by 3,729 votes. He resigned from the Federal Party in 1958 as he opposed the party's proposed satyagraha movement. In June 1959 Prime Minister S. W. R. D. Bandaranaike appointed Mustapha as the Parliamentary Secretary to the Minister of Finance in his cabinet. Following Bandaranaike's assassination in September, Wijeyananda Dahanayake who took over as prime minister appointed Mustapha as the Minister of Finance in November, becoming the first Muslim Minister of Finance.

At the 4th parliamentary election, held in March 1960, Mustapha contested the newly created seat of Nintavur. He failed to get elected and was defeated by M. I. M. Abdul Majeed by 4,627 votes. He re-contested the seat at the subsequent parliamentary elections in July, where he lost again to Majeed, this time by 7,776 votes. He was ultimately successful at the 6th parliamentary election, held in March 1965, as the United National Party candidate, defeating Majeed by 4,3899 votes. Following the election he was appointed by Prime Minister Dudley Senanayake as the Parliamentary Secretary to the Minister of Social Services.

Mustapha was re-elected at the 7th parliamentary election, held in May 1970, by only 75 votes, securing 13,481 votes (49% of the total vote). He switched political allegiances and joined the Sri Lanka Freedom Party. In 1976 he was appointed as the deputy Minister of Justice by Prime Minister Sirimavo Bandaranaike after she elevated Ratnasiri Wickremanayake to the position of Minister.

At the 1977 Sri Lankan parliamentary election he contested the Pottuvil electorate as the Sri Lanka Freedom Party candidate. He placed third after polling 22,378 votes (25% of the total vote), behind the United National Party candidate, A. M. Mohamed Jalaldeen, who received 30,318 votes (34% of the total vote) and the Tamil United Liberation Front candidate, Mylvaganam Canagaratnam, with 23,990 votes.

He was a member of the Eastern University Council.
