= Pottu Amman (Tamil militant) =

LTTE Rebel

- பொட்டு அம்மான்
- Born: S. Sivashankar; 1962; Nayanmaarkattu, Ceylon (now Sri Lanka)
- Died: 18 May 2009 (aged 46–47); Nanthi Lagoon, Mullaitivu District, Sri Lanka
- Military service
- Allegiance: Tamil Eelam
- Branch: Liberation Tigers of Tamil Eelam
- Service years: 1981 –2009
- Commands: Head of Tiger Organization Security Intelligence Service
- Conflicts: Sri Lankan Civil War: Eelam War I, between 1983 and 1987; Indian intervention in the Sri Lankan Civil War, between 1987 and 1990; Eelam War II, between 1990 and 1995; Eelam War III, between 1995 and 2002; Eelam War IV, between 2006 and 2009

Shanmugalingam Sivashankar (Tamil: சண்முகலிங்கம் சிவசங்கர்; 1962 – 18 May 2009; commonly known by the nom de guerre Pottu Amman) was a Sri Lankan Tamil rebel and leading member of the Liberation Tigers of Tamil Eelam, a separatist Tamil militant organisation in Sri Lanka.

== Early life ==
Sivashankar (Note: Another source gives his name as Sivasankaran.) was born in 1962. He was from Nayanmaarkattu near Ariyalai in northern Ceylon. He was the son of Shanmugalingam (Shanmuganathan), a clerk working in the up-country region. He was educated at Maheswari Vidyalayam, Canagaratnam Madhya Maha Vidyalayam (Stanley College) and Jaffna Hindu College.

Sivashankar was a supporter of the Tamil United Liberation Front (TULF) MP V. Yogeswaran and once when they met, Sivashankar slashed his forearm and daubed Yogeswaran's forehead with blood. Sivashankar started bleeding excessively, fainted and was taken to hospital. It is believed that he got the nickname "Pottu" (Tamil for tilak) from this incident.

Sivashankar married a woman from the Batticaloa region and had a son and daughter.

== LTTE ==
Sivashankar joined the Tamil militant group Liberation Tigers of Tamil Eelam (LTTE) in 1981 along with T. Sivanesan (Soosai). (Note: Another source says he joined the LTTE in 1982.) He took on the nom de guerre "Pottu". Seniority in the LTTE resulted in his nom de guerre "Pottu" being suffixed by "Amman" (uncle). After being trained he served briefly as the bodyguard of the LTTE leader, V. Prabhakaran. He was then sent to Tamil Nadu in India to be in charge of the shore operations in the Vedaranyam area. In 1985, whilst he was in charge of the LTTE's camp in Vedaranyam, he was abducted by rival Tamil militant group People's Liberation Organisation of Tamil Eelam (PLOTE). Talks mediated by a former TULF MP failed to result in Pottu Amman's release and so the LTTE's Shankar abducted PLOTE member Jotheeswaran (alias Kannan) who was later exchanged for Pottu Amman.

Pottu Amman returned to Sri Lanka in 1987. He was sent to the Eastern Province where he was the LTTE's associate commander for Batticaloa District. He often clashed with the ambitious Karuna Amman who wanted to be the eastern regional commander. One of the factors leading to Karuna's defection to the Sri Lankan government in 2004 was his rivalry with Pottu Amman. Pottu Amman was recalled to Jaffna, and in October 1987, when war had erupted between the LTTE and the Indian Peace Keeping Force (IPKF), he was sent to Tamil Nadu to co-ordinate the flow of supplies from India to Sri Lanka. He was briefly jailed in India for smuggling. He returned to Jaffna to take part in military operations against the IPKF and was briefly Jaffna commander. After being injured in the stomach he moved to the Vanni region to recover.

After his recovery, Pottu Amman was put in charge of the Tiger Organization Security Intelligence Service (TOSIS), the LTTE's intelligence wing, in mid 1988. Following the IPKF's withdrawal in March 1990 and under Pottu Amman's leadership, TOSIS expanded greatly and became a formidable organisation, copying the tactics of Inter-Services Intelligence, Mossad and Shin Bet. As chief of TOSIS, Pottu Amman is believed to have masterminded the assassinations of Rajiv Gandhi, Ranasinghe Premadasa, Ranjan Wijeratne, Clancy Fernando and many others. He also played a key role in the unmasking of the "conspiracy" against LTTE leader Prabhakaran by deputy leader Mahattaya. Pottu Amman is believed to have tortured Mahattaya and extracted his "confession". In 1993 two separate divisions were created in TOSIS: National Intelligence Division and Military Intelligence Service. Pottu Amman was in charge of the National Intelligence Division as well as being in overall charge of TOSIS. He was later in charge of the LTTE's Chiruththaigal (leopard) commando division. In 1997 he was appointed military commander of Jaffna peninsula.

In March 2008 Prabhakaran, Pottu Amman and four other LTTE members were charged with the assassination of Foreign Minister Lakshman Kadirgamar in August 2005.

=== Death ===
What happened to Pottu Amman, like many senior LTTE members in the final stages of the Sri Lankan civil war in 2009, remains shrouded in mystery and is prone to wild speculations and rumours. Officially, Pottu Amman was killed in the early hours of 18 May 2009 as he, Colonel Letchumanan and other LTTE cadres tried to cross the Nanthi Kadal lagoon in a boat and were fired upon by Sri Lankan soldiers.

According to the Sri Lankan military, the wife of Soosai, head of the Sea Tigers, had told them during interrogation that Pottu Amman, together with Soosai, Prabhakaran and Prabhakaran's son Charles Anthony, had remained in the war zone in the final days of the war. The military claimed to have killed 18 senior LTTE members, including Pottu Amman, during the final battle of the civil war on 18 May 2009. They also claimed to have intercepted LTTE communication confirming Pottu Amman's death. The military initially claimed to have identified the body of Pottu Amman but later admitted that they weren't certain that they had found his body.

In September 2009, Deputy Solicitor-General Kapila Waidyaratne informed the Colombo High Court that Prabhakaran and Pottu Amman had been killed in May 2009 in Karaithuraipatru and that their names should be removed from those charged with Kadirgamar's assassination. Judge Kumudini Wickremasinghe approved the changes, judicially confirming Pottu Amman's death. In March 2010 the Sri Lankan government asked Interpol to remove Pottu Amman from its most wanted list. In October 2010 the charges against Prabhakaran and Pottu Amman in relation to the assassination of Rajiv Gandhi were dropped after the Central Bureau of Investigation filed a report stating that the pair were dead.

The failure of the Sri Lankan military to produce Pottu Amman's body has fueled the belief that he survived the civil war. Some have theorised that Pottu Amman escaped whilst others claim that he was captured by the Sri Lankan military and was being held captive in a secret location. In September 2014, reports appeared claiming that Pottu Amman had been arrested in Hong Kong and brought back to Sri Lanka. The Sri Lankan military dismissed the reports, saying that, although they hadn't found his body, they knew that Pottu Amman had been killed in the final stages of the civil war. In March 2016, the Divaina reported that Pottu Amman was living with his family in Tamil Nadu, India using the name "Kuruttu".
