= Murunkan massacre =

1978 mass murder in Murunkan, Vavuniya, Sri Lanka

Murunkan massacre of Inspector Bastianpillai and his police team
- Location: Vavuniya District, Sri Lanka
- Date: 7 April 1978
- Target: Sri Lanka Police officers
- Attack type: Armed massacre
- Weapon: Guns
- Deaths: 4
- Perpetrator: LTTE

The Murunkan massacre of Inspector Bastianpillai and his team of police officers was the mass murder of a team of CID officers of the Sri Lanka Police on 7 April 1978 in the jungles of Murunkan in the Vavuniya District. Four police officers including Inspector Bastianpillai were killed by LTTE members led by Uma Maheswaran.

== Background ==
In December 1977 M. Canagaratnam, Member of Parliament from Pottuvil crossed over to the government, joining the United National Party from the Tamil United Liberation Front. In response, Uma Maheswaran and LTTE members visited Canagaratnam's home in Kollupitiya, Colombo and shot him several times. Although he survived the shooting, he died of his injuries on 20 April 1980.

The attempted murder was investigated by a team of detectives from the Criminal Investigation Department led by the Tamil Inspector of Police T.L.B. Bastianpillai who headed the CID TULF desk which monitored activities of the Tamil parties following the assassination of Alfred Duraiappah. Bastiampillai was considered as one of the best CID officers at the time and had been charged with security of the visiting heads of states to the 1976 Non-Aligned Movement Summit in Colombo. He was assisted by Sub Inspector Perampalan who was also a Tamil.

In April 1978, Bastianpillai and Perampalan received information that Uma Maheswaran was hiding in a farm in the middle of the jungle in Murunkan.

== Massacre ==
On 7 April 1978, the team of police officers consisting of Bastianpillai, Perampalan, Police Sergeant Balasingham and Police Constable (Driver) Sriwardene reached the location in a police car. The farm had been a training camp for the LTTE. The police team disembarked from the car and approached what seemed to be laborers standing near a well. They were unaware that Maheswaran and several others were hiding in a tree overlooking the well. Bastianpillai questioned the identities of the men. He was then offered water to drink putting down his sub-machine gun. One of the men posing as laborers was Sellakili, an LTTE member who knocked Bastiampillai in the head and took his sub-machine gun, killing Bastiampillai and Sergeant Balasingham before they could react. Perampalan attempted to shoot back but was shot and wounded, falling into the well, where he was shot dead by Sellakili. Constable Sriwardene, who attempted to escape on foot, was thereafter gunned down.

Bastianpillai's body was mutilated and dumped into the well with the bodies of the other policemen. The weapons of the police officers were collected, including Balasingham's sub-machine gun. It was the first sub-machine gun acquired by the Tamil militancy. The radio was removed and the police car was set on fire after it was driven further away.

== Aftermath ==
Bastiampillai's superiors became concerned with his sudden disappearance, as he had not informed them of his movements. Several days later the police received information about dead bodies in a well in the jungles around Murunkan. A police team investigating this report found the badly decomposed bodies of the policemen, identifying them to be of Bastiampillai and his team.

The Liberation Tigers of Tamil Eelam claimed responsibility for the killing of 9 police officers, including Bastiampillai, in late April via TULF. This sent shock-waves across the country and shocked the government as Bastiampillai was its lead investigator of the Tamil militancy. The LTTE in the following months assassinated more Tamil police officers investigating the Tamil militancy, including the killing of Jaffna Headquarters Inspector Pathmanathan and Inspector Kumar, who had retired after serving as the Personal Assistant to the Superintendent of Police, Jaffna.

Sellakili became an LTTE leader and was killed ambushing the army patrol Four Four Bravo. Uma Maheswaran, who was later involved in the 1988 Maldives Coup, was found dead with bullet wounds near the Maldivian High Commission in Colombo in July 1989.

== See also ==
- 1990 massacre of Sri Lankan Police officers
