= M. Manickam =

Ceylon Tamil politician

Member of the Senate of Ceylon

Personal details
- Party: Illankai Tamil Arasu Kachchi
- Ethnicity: Ceylon Tamil

Muttiah Manickam was a Ceylon Tamil politician and member of the Senate of Ceylon. Manickam's daughter Kala was married to Member of Parliament Sam Tambimuttu.
