= Maheswary Velautham =

Sri Lankan activist (died 2008)

Maheswary Velautham

Maheswary Velautham (died May 13, 2008) was a founder of Forum for Human Dignity, a non-governmental organization, and a human rights lawyer and activist from Jaffna, Sri Lanka. She was known for tracking the status of returned failed refugee claimants from other countries to Sri Lanka, particularly the West. According to pro-rebel Tamilnet news service, she was killed by unknown gunmen on May 13, 2008, at her residence in the Jaffna Peninsula. The government and Eelam People's Democratic Party to whose leader she had sometimes functioned as an advisor on human rights issues blamed the rebel Liberation Tigers of Tamil Eelam for her murder. Former EPDP member and aide to Douglas Devananda S.Ponnaiah claimed at a press conference in Jaffna Press Club that journalist Mylvaganam Nimalrajan, Atputharajah Nadarajah, K. S. Raja and Maheswary Velautham were killed by the EPDP for personal reasons.
