= Nintavur Electoral District =

FOrmer electoral district in Sri Lanka

Coordinates: 7.3500°N 81.8500°E

Nintavur electoral district was an electoral district of Sri Lanka between March 1960 and February 1989. The district was renamed Sammanthurai electoral district in July 1977. The district was named after the towns of Nintavur and Sammanthurai in Ampara District, Eastern Province. The 1978 Constitution of Sri Lanka introduced the proportional representation electoral system for electing members of Parliament. The existing 160 mainly single-member electoral districts were replaced with 22 multi-member electoral districts. Sammanthurai electoral district was replaced by the Ampara (Amparai) multi-member electoral district at the 1989 general elections, the first under the PR system, though Sammanthurai continues to be a polling division of the multi-member electoral district.

== Members of Parliament ==
Key

Independent SLFP UNP

Election	Member	Party	Term
1960 (March)	M. I. M. Abdul Majeed		1960-1965
1960 (July)	M. I. M. Abdul Majeed		1960-1965
1965	M. M. Mustapha	United National Party	1965-1977
1970	M. M. Mustapha	United National Party	1965-1977
1977	M. A. Abdul Majeed		1977–1989

== Elections ==
=== 1960 (March) Parliamentary General Election ===
Results of the 4th parliamentary election held on 19 March 1960 for the district:

Candidate	Party	Symbol	Votes	%
M. I. M. Abdul Majeed		Radio Set	10,017	54.81%
M. M. Mustapha		Umbrella	5,390	29.49%
Haji M. Mirza		Cockerel	2,655	14.53%
M. Sheriff Cader		Sun	215	1.18%
Valid Votes			18,277	100.00%
Rejected Votes			118	
Total Polled			18,395	
Registered Electors			21,087	
Turnout			87.23%	

=== 1960 (July) Parliamentary General Election ===
Results of the 5th parliamentary election held on 20 July 1960 for the district:

Candidate	Party	Symbol	Votes	%
M. I. M. Abdul Majeed		Cockerel	12,115	73.63%
M. A. M. Jalaldeen		Radio Set	4,339	26.37%
Valid Votes			16,454	100.00%
Rejected Votes			94	
Total Polled			16,548	
Registered Electors			21,087	
Turnout			78.47%	

=== 1965 Parliamentary General Election ===
Results of the 6th parliamentary election held on 22 March 1965 for the district:

Candidate	Party	Symbol	Votes	%
M. M. Mustapha	United National Party	Elephant	13,789	59.46%
M. I. M. Abdul Majeed		Cockerel	9,400	40.54%
Valid Votes			23,189	100.00%
Rejected Votes			210	
Total Polled			23,399	
Registered Electors			26,497	
Turnout			88.31%	

=== 1970 Parliamentary General Election ===
Results of the 7th parliamentary election held on 27 May 1970 for the district:

Candidate	Party	Symbol	Votes	%
M. M. Mustapha	United National Party	Elephant	13,481	49.12%
M. I. M. Abdul Majeed		Radio	13,406	48.85%
I.H. Mohamed Cassim	Sri Lanka Freedom Party	Hand	556	2.03%
Valid Votes			27,443	100.00%
Rejected Votes			84	
Total Polled			27,527	
Registered Electors			29,718	
Turnout			92.63%	

=== 1977 Parliamentary General Election ===
Results of the 8th parliamentary election held on 21 July 1977 for the district:

Candidate	Party	Symbol	Votes	%
M. A. Abdul Majeed		Elephant	13,642	54.87%
H. L. M. Hassim	Tamil United Liberation Front	Sun	8,615	34.65%
Abdul Jabar		Hand	2,605	10.48%
Valid Votes			24,862	100.00%
Rejected Votes			82	
Total Polled			24,944	
Registered Electors			27,308	
Turnout			91.34%	
