= M. M. Ebrahim =

Skri Lankan Member of Parliament (1896–1957)

Hon. Mudaliar M. M. Ebrahim MBE

Member of the Ceylon Parliament for Pottuvil
- In office 1947–1956
- Preceded by: seat created
- Succeeded by: M. M. Mustapha

Personal details
- Born: Meerakuddy Mohamed Ebrahim; 2 October 1896
- Died: 1956
- Party: United National Party

Mudaliar Al-Haj Meerakuddy Mohamed Ebrahim, MBE (2 October 1896 – 1957) was a Sri Lankan Muslim former Member of Parliament representing Pottuvil.

At the 1st parliamentary election held in 1947 Ebrahim, as an independent, in the seat of Pottuvil. He received 7,407 votes (55.9% of the total vote) defeating the only other candidate, A. R. A. Razik (representing the United National Party), by 1,899 votes. Razik was a prominent Muslim leader and a founding member of the UNP, who had been denied the party's nomination for Colombo Central and was forced to contest Pottuvil, an area which he did not have a personal political base. In 1947 Razik was granted a seat in the Senate of Ceylon and was subsequently elected to parliament in the next parliamentary election. Ebrahim was one of only six Muslims elected to the first parliament of Ceylon. Later in his first term of office he joined the UNP.

He was awarded the honor of Mudaliar (Mudaliyar) and in the 1952 New Year Honours Ebrahim was appointed a Member of the Order of the British Empire (MBE), for his public service to the Pottuvil electorate.

He was re-elected at the 2nd parliamentary election held in May 1952 but was only just successful in defeating M. M. Mustapha, the Federal Party candidate, by 559 votes. In 1954 Ebrahim was appointed parliamentary secretary to the Minister of External Affairs and Defence and in 1955 the parliamentary secretary to the Minister of Local Government. He did not, owing to ill health, seek re-election at the 1956 parliamentary elections.
