= Ramanan (Tamil militant) =

Militant leader of Tamil Tigers

Colonel Ramanan
- Born: October 14, 1965
- Died: May 21, 2006 (aged 40); Vavunathivu, Sri Lanka
- Other name: Kandiah Ulaganathan
- Occupation: Deputy Militant leader of eastern command of Tamil Tigers
- Political party: Liberation Tigers of Tamil Eelam

Kandiah Ulaganathan (Tamil: கந்தையா உலகநாதன்; 1965 – May 21, 2006), also known with his nom-de-guerre Colonel Ramanan (ரமணன்), was a senior commander of the Tamil Tigers, and was the number two in the Tamil Tiger military wing and its chief intelligence operative in the eastern region. He was from Palukamam, Batticaloa District, Sri Lanka.

== Early life ==
Ulganathan was born in 1965 in Palugaamam to a family of farmers. He studied at the Kandumani Maha Vidyalam. He joined the LTTE in 1986, a year before his brother joined. His brother was killed in a skirmish with the IPKF in 1987.

== Death ==
Colonel Ramanan was killed by a sniper along Vavunathivu forward defence line on 21 May 2006. Tamilnet claimed the sniper was connected to the Sri Lankan Army, while military forces claimed was ambushed by members of the Tamil Makkal Viduthalai Pulikal. They allegedly ambushed him as he was riding a motorcycle. They attempted to detonate a mine, which failed, leading to his demise at the hand of gunshots.

== See also ==
- Notable assassinations of the Sri Lankan Civil War
