= K. S. Raja =

K. S. Raja கே. எஸ். ராஜ
- Born: 8 February 1942; Jaffna
- Died: 3 September 1994 (aged 52); Colombo
- Occupation: Journalist
- Notable credit: Popular Radio Journalist

Kanagaratnam Sriskandarajah (Tamil: கநகரத்நம் ஶ்ரீஸ்கந்தராஜ) known mononymously as K. S. Raja was a very popular Radio Ceylon radio announcer from Sri Lanka. He was popular with his audiences both in Sri Lanka and Tamil Nadu, India. During the course of the Sri Lankan civil war, he was killed by EPDP by poison in 1994

== Biography ==
He was born in a town called Theldeniya (see here) in the [Kandy District to upper class minority Sri Lankan Tamil parents and grew up in Kotatadi, Jaffna. His father was a doctor and had three sisters and a brother. His two sisters are surgeons and the brother Somas a famous DJ. He entered university to do engineering but dropped out to be a radio announcer.

== Career in Radio Ceylon ==
He was a pioneering announcer in the Tamil language known for his melodious voice and innovative programs. His programs were popular in the state of Tamil Nadu in India.

== Death ==
After the 1983 Black July anti-minority pogrom he briefly moved to India and was involved with the Tamil militant group Eelam People's Revolutionary Liberation Front (EPRLF). Subsequent to the Indo-Sri Lanka peace accord in 1987, he returned to his former job in Radio Ceylon now known as Sri Lanka Broadcasting Corporation.

With the resumption of hostilities between the government of Sri Lanka and the main rebel group Liberation Tigers of Tamil Eelam(LTTE) he was abducted by unknown persons and found murdered in a Colombo beach.

== Controversy ==
According to a former member of a political party and a paramilitary group known as the Eelam People's Democratic Party(EPDP) which in itself was a pro government splinter group from the EPRLF that K. S. Raja was once part of, K. S. Raja was killed by orders of Douglas Devananda the leader of EPDP.

When Douglas Devanada was asked about his involvement in the murder of K. S. Raja, he did not directly deny the responsibility or answer the question, instead pointed to other journalists allegedly killed by LTTE.

== See also ==
- Notable assassinations of the Sri Lankan Civil War
