= S. Nadarajah =

Sri Lankan politician

Member of the Senate of Ceylon
- In office 1965–1971

Chairman, Jaffna District Development Council
- In office 1981–1983

Personal details
- Died: 12 February 1988
- Party: All Ceylon Tamil Congress
- Other political affiliations: Tamil United Liberation Front
- Profession: Lawyer
- Ethnicity: Sri Lankan Tamil

Subramaniam Nadarajah (died in 1988) was a Sri Lankan Tamil lawyer, politician and member of the Senate of Ceylon.

Known as "Pottar" Nadarajah, he was one of the pioneers of All Ceylon Tamil Congress. He was one of the organisers of the 1961 satyagraha led by the Illankai Tamil Arasu Kachchi (Federal Party). He was a member of the Senate of Ceylon from 1965 to 1971.

In 1981 Nadarajah became the first and only chairman of the Jaffna District Development Council. He resigned in 1983, stating that he didn't even have the power to "purchase table and chairs" for the council.

Nadarajah was shot dead on 12 February 1988, aged 72. It's alleged that he was assassinated by the rebel Liberation Tigers of Tamil Eelam for associating with the Indian Peace Keeping Force.
