= Nimalan Soundaranayagam =

Sri Lankan Tamil politician

Honourable Ashley Nimalanayagam Soundaranayagam

Member of Parliament for Batticaloa District
- In office 2000–2000

Personal details
- Born: 6 November 1950 Morokottanchenai, Batticaloa, Sri Lanka
- Died: 7 November 2000 (aged 50) Kiran, Sri Lanka
- Cause of death: Assassination
- Party: Tamil United Liberation Front
- Spouse: Christina Jeyaranji Soundranayagam
- Profession: Teacher

Ashley Nimalanayagam Soundaranayagam (6 November 1950 – 7 November 2000) was a Sri Lankan Tamil teacher, politician and Member of Parliament.

== Biography ==
Soundaranayagam was born on 6 November 1950, in Morokkotanchenai, Batticaloa District in Eastern Sri Lanka. He was a school principal. He had earlier worked as a science teacher. During this time, he was detained by Sri Lankan authorities and held at the Boosa camp.

Soundranayagam is related to two other former Members of Parliament, Joseph Pararajasingham, and Rajan Selvanayagam. Pararajahsingham was married to Soundranayagam's cousin, Sugunam Joseph, and Rajan Selvanayagam is another cousin of Soundranayagam.

He was elected to Parliament to represent the Kalkudah Electoral District in the 2000 parliamentary elections. He secured the position with a total of 15,687 personal preference votes.

== Death ==
Soundaranayagam was shot dead on 7 November 2000 in Kiran, less than a month after the 10 October elections. His private secretary who was travelling with him during the assassination, had only sustained minor injury during the attack, and was later held on suspicion by the police. The assassination was blamed on Karuna Amman, the Eastern Regional Commander for the rebel Liberation Tigers of Tamil Eelam.

The assassination brought out the public's frustration both at LTTE, and also at the Sri Lankan government. The LTTE were criticized for their long history of assassinating Tamil political figures who sought and end to ethnic conflicts through democracy. The Sri Lankan government on the other hand, were criticized for not acting against these assassinations and protecting the democratic freedom of the Tamil people.
