= Sam Tambimuttu =

Sri Lankan Tamil politician

Hon. Sam Tambimuttu

Member of Parliament for Batticaloa District
- In office 1989–1990
- Succeeded by: Joseph Pararajasingham

Personal details
- Born: 1932
- Died: 7 May 1990 Colombo, Sri Lanka
- Party: Eelam People's Revolutionary Liberation Front
- Profession: Lawyer

Samuel Pennington Thavarasa Tambimuttu (1932 – 1990) was a Sri Lankan Tamil lawyer, politician and Member of Parliament.

== Early life and family ==
Tambimuttu was born in 1932. He was the grand nephew of E. R. Tambimuttu, member of the State Council of Ceylon. He was married to Kala, daughter of Senator M. Manickam. They had a son Arun.

Tambimuttu was a Methodist.

== Career ==
Tambimuttu was a proctor and practiced law in Batticaloa. He was chairman of Batticaloa Citizen's Committee. In this capacity he would intervene on behalf of youths arrested by the paramilitary Special Task Force.

Tambimuttu had been a member of the Tamil United Liberation Front for a long time. He contested the 1989 parliamentary election as one of the Eelam People's Revolutionary Liberation Front's candidates in Batticaloa District and was elected to Parliament.

== Death ==
Tambimuttu was assassinated on 7 May 1990 outside the Canadian High Commission in Colombo. His wife Kala died on 16 May as a result of injuries sustained in the assassination. The assassination was blamed on the rebel Liberation Tigers of Tamil Eelam.
