= Eelamurasu =

Sri Lankan Tamil language newspaper

- Type: Daily
- Owner: M. Amirthalingam
- Founded: 1984
- Ceased publication: 1987
- Political alignment: Tamil Nationalist
- Language: Tamil
- Headquarters: Jaffna, Sri Lanka

Eelamurasu was a Tamil language newspaper, which was published between 1984 and 1987. It was known for promoting a Tamil nationalist prospective and a pro-LTTE stance.

The first issues were produced in 1984, published by Myl Amirthalingam, a businessman from Jaffna, who ran as the United National Party candidate at 1977 Sri Lankan parliamentary elections in the Kayts electorate. In 1986 it was taken over by the LTTE, who then murdered its owner, Amirthalingam, and a senior reporter, I. Shanmugalingam, resulting in a number of the paper's senior journalists fleeing overseas.

In 1987 it was closed down by the Indian Peace Keeping Force with all its copies confiscated, its journalists and workers arrested and its printing machinery destroyed.
