= M. A. Abdul Majeed =

Sri Lankan politician (1926–2011)

Hon. M. A. Abdul Majeed MP

Member of the Ceylonese Parliament for Pottuvil
- In office 1960–1977
- Preceded by: M. M. Mustapha
- Succeeded by: A. M. Mohamed Jalaldeen

Member of Parliament for Sammanthurai
- In office 1977–1988
- Preceded by: M. M. Mustapha

Member of Parliament for National List
- In office 1989–1994

Personal details
- Born: 15 October 1926
- Died: 29 November 2011 (aged 85) Sammanthurai, Sri Lanka
- Party: United National Party
- Education: Batticaloa Shivananda Vidyalayam; Jaffna Central College; University of Ceylon

M. A. Abdul Majeed (15 October 1926 – 29 November 2011) was a Sri Lankan politician and Member of Parliament who became the Deputy Minister of Agriculture and Lands, Power and Highways, Power and Energy, Post and Telecommunication and Handloom Industries between 1977 and 1994.

== Early life and family ==
M. A. Abdul Majeed was born on 15 October 1926. His family hailed from Vanniya in Sammanthurai in south-eastern Ceylon. He was first educated at Batticaloa Shivananda Vidyalayam and Jaffna Central College, then enrolled at the University of Ceylon in Colombo, graduating in 1950 with B.A. degree in economics.

Majeed married R. Kadeeja and had five children. A. M. M. Naushad is his son-in-law.

== Career ==
In 1954, Majeed entered local politics, serving as chairman of Sammanthurai Town Council until 1960.

Majeed contested the March 1960 parliamentary election as an independent candidate in Pottuvil and was elected to Parliament. He held the seat until 1977, when he switched to the Sammanthurai constituency at the 1977 parliamentary election. He was later appointed a United National Party (UNP) National List MP after the 1989 parliamentary election.

Majeed served in several deputy ministerial positions when the UNP was in power between 1977 and 1994: Agriculture and Lands (1977–78); Power and Highways (1978–80); Power and Energy (1980–81); Post and Telecommunication (1981–89); and Handloom Industries (1989–94). He was also District Minister for Batticaloa (1981–89).

== Death ==
Majeed died on 29 November 2011 at the age of 85 at Sammanthurai Base Hospital after a short-term illness.
