= Eelam War II =

Armed conflict between Sri Lankan military and LTTE

- Part of the Sri Lankan Civil War
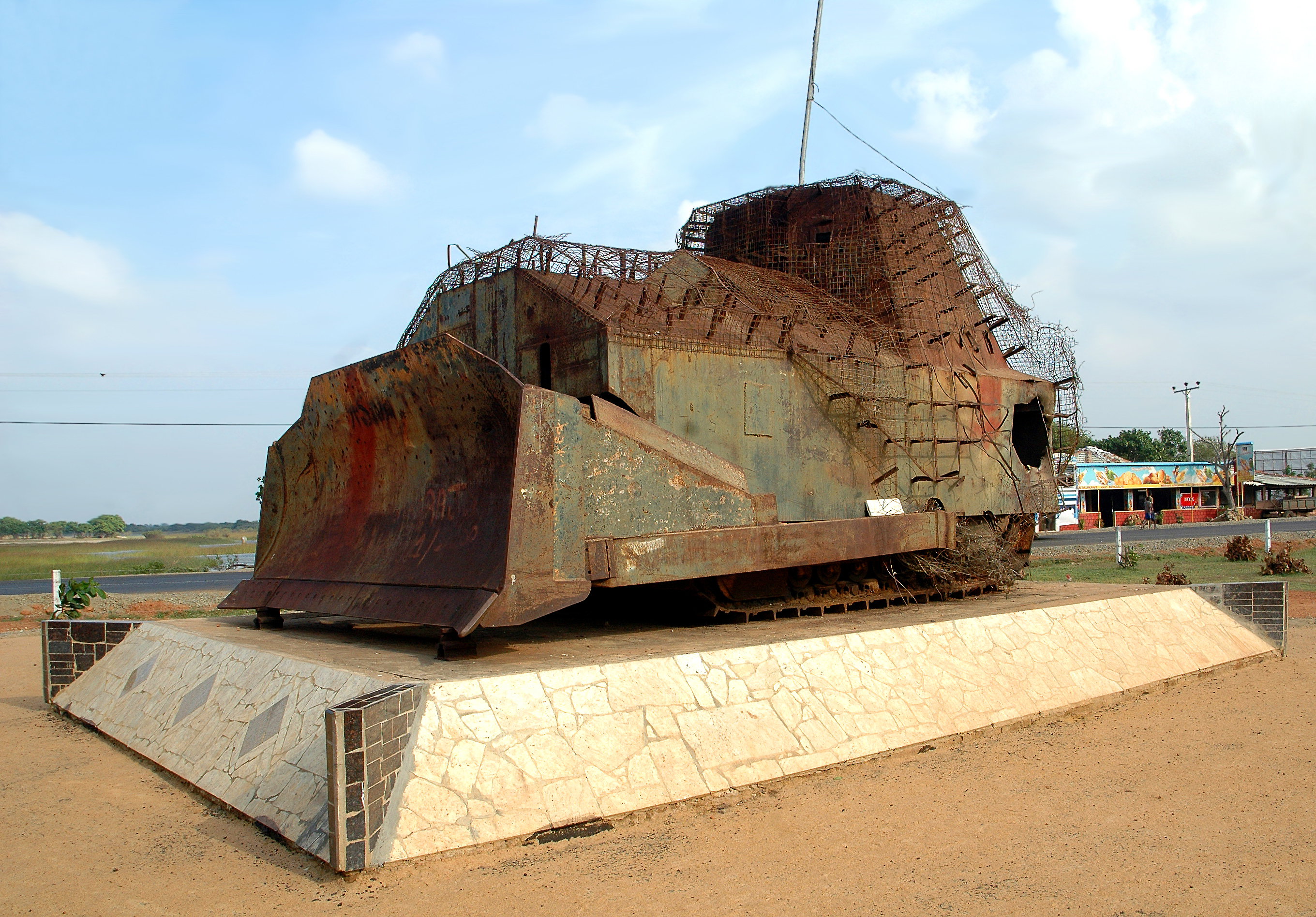
- Improvised armored bulldozer of Liberation Tigers of Tamil Eelam used in First Battle of Elephant Pass. Today, it is one of the Sri Lankan Civil War memorials.
Date	June 10, 1990 – January 1995 (5 years)
Location	Sri Lanka
Result	Overall indecisive, Major territorial gains for the LTTE

Belligerents
Sri Lanka	Liberation Tigers of Tamil Eelam

Commanders and leaders
(Sri Lanka) Ranasinghe Premadasa (1989–93) (Sri Lanka) Dingiri Banda Wijetunge (1993–94) (Sri Lanka) Chandrika Kumaratunga (1994–1995); Lt Gen Denzil Kobbekaduwa (1989–92); Maj Gen Vijaya Wimalaratne (1989–92); Rea Adm H. R. Amaraweera (1989–92); Rea Adm Mohan Jayamaha (1989–92)	Velupillai Prabhakaran

Units involved
Sri Lanka Armed Forces; Sri Lanka Army; Sri Lanka Navy; Sri Lanka Air Force	Unknown

Eelam War II refers to the second phase of the Sri Lankan civil war between the Sri Lankan military and the Liberation Tigers of Tamil Eelam, lasting from June 1990 to 1995. The war erupted after the breakdown of peace talks between the LTTE and the government of President Ranasinghe Premadasa, during which mutual distrust and provocations escalated tensions. It ended with the start of peace talks between the LTTE and the government of President Chandrika Kumaratunga.

== Prelude ==
The first phase of the civil war ended in July 1987 following the Indo-Sri Lanka Accord and the arrival of the IPKF. The accord proposed greater autonomy for the Tamil rebels in the North in return for disarmament. The presence of the Indian forces triggered an uprising in the south by the Janatha Vimukthi Peramuna. In the North, some Tamil militant groups complied with the IPKF for disarmament, while others, including the LTTE did not cooperate and soon the IPKF was heavily engaged in combat. President Premadasa campaigned in 1989 on the pledge of removing the IPKF. In April 1989, Premadasa declared a unilateral ceasefire and opened direct talks with the LTTE, excluding India. By May, the Sri Lankan government had granted more powers to the North-eastern Province. In June, Premadasa requested India to withdraw its troops, which was rejected by India. Sri Lanka had contended that it had held its end of the deal by confining its troops to barracks and granting a measure of autonomy to an elected Tamil provincial government; the Sri Lankan government threatened to take India to the United Nations Security Council for retaining troops unwelcome, which outraged India. An angered Sri Lanka refused to attend the SAARC Ministerial meeting in July in Islamabad, causing its postponement. India agreed to the withdrawal in July. The last IPKF units departed in March 1990. The LTTE soon eliminated rival Tamil groups including the Eelam People's Revolutionary Liberation Front (EPRLF) and People's Liberation Organisation of Tamil Eelam (PLOTE) consolidating its position as the dominant Tamil militant organization.

=== Massacre of police officers ===
By June, the peace talks broke down, the LTTE surrounded police and military outposts in the Eastern Province and ordered their surrender following. The Government order the police officers to surrender and turn in their weapons, while the army refused to surrender. According to the UTHR(J) a local LTTE commander known as "Cashier" ordered the massacre of surrendered Police officers, thus ending the ceasefire, starting the second phase of the war.

== Start of the Eelam War II ==
With the IPKF departure in March 1990, the control of the Jaffna Peninsula was formally handed back to the Sri Lankan government. However, the government had only a few thousand troops based in several isolated camps in the north, including key garrisons at Palaly, Kankesanthurai, and Jaffna Fort creating a power vacuum allowing the LTTE to assert its dominance rapidly over the Jaffa peninsula. As soon as fighting broke out in June 1990, these camps and garrisons with detachments of platoon or company strength came under siege utilizing months of preparation. The LTTE took over several police stations and the army withdrew from several camps in the first few days of hostilities. In July the army camp in Kokavil was overrun with the enter detachment killed. LTTE effectively engaged the army on multiple locations, the army short on numbers to effectively engage the LTTE soon found itself on the defensive. In the east, the LTTE had besieged the isolated army camp at Mullaitivu, which the army successfully relived in September with Operation Sea Breeze, its first amphibious operation.

=== 1990 Batticaloa massacre ===
The 1990 Batticaloa massacre, also known as the Sathurukondan massacre, was a massacre of at least 184 Tamil refugees from three villages in the Batticaloa District by the Sri Lankan Army on September 9, 1990. According to the Special Presidential Commission of inquiry appointed by the People's Alliance government, 5 infants, 42 children under the age of ten, 85 women and 28 old persons were among the 184 villagers who were murdered. Three captains of the Sri Lankan Army were identified as the culprits.

== Jaffna falls to the LTTE ==
From August to September 1990, the LTTE intensified its offensive with sustained mortar and artillery attacks on the army garrison holdup in the Jaffna Fort consisting mostly of policemen, cutting off reinforcements and food supplies by controlling surrounding areas. The government's attempts to send reinforcements by sea were thwarted, as the LTTE's newly organized Sea Tigers disrupted naval supply convoys along the Jaffna coast. By September, the LTTE had captured the Jaffna town and surrounded the fort. After weeks of heavy fighting, the army withdrew from the fort under fire in Operation Thrividha Balaya, effectively conceding the town to the LTTE. Following the fall of the fort, the LTTE took full control of Jaffna town and much of the northern peninsula.

The organization quickly established an extensive civil administration—complete with police, courts, taxation systems, and even traffic management—transforming Jaffna into the de facto capital of Tamil Eelam. With rival Tamil groups and the central government removed from the Jaffna peninsula, LTTE established the foundations of parallel state structure, and claimed sole representative of the Tamil people. This gave the LTTE unprecedented territorial legitimacy and strengthened its bargaining position in any potential future negotiations with the Sri Lankan government. This marked a significant shift in the nature of the conflict: the LTTE now held and governed territory rather than operating as a purely guerrilla force. Scholars and military analysts view the capture of Jaffna as a turning point in the war. It demonstrated the LTTE's growing capability to conduct conventional, large-scale operations, and underscored the government's logistical and intelligence failures in securing the north after the IPKF's withdrawal.

=== Expulsion of Muslims from the Northern Province ===
In October the LTTE expelled all Muslims from the Northern Province of Sri Lanka.

== Government forces on the defensive ==
The government consolidated its defences in its remaining strongholds in the peninsula. In Mankulam, the army camp was under siege from June until November, when remaining troops withdrew, yielding the area to the LTTE. On 18 December, Trincomalee Are Commander Brigadier Lucky Wijayaratne was killed by a landmine, becoming the most senior army officer killed to that point.

=== 1991 Kokkadichcholai massacre ===
On June 12, 1991, following a LTTE landmine attack on the Sri Lankan Army, 152 Tamil civilians were massacred by members of the Sri Lankan Army in the village Kokkadichcholai near the eastern province town of Batticaloa. Locals also reported that six Tamil women were raped, including two sisters.

== Battle of Elephant Pass ==
The LTTE quickly consolidate its territory and the government launched a series of operations to regain territory and disrupt LTTE supply routes. Fighting was concentrated in Jaffna, Vavuniya, and Batticaloa. In July, the LTTE launched a major siege on Elephant Pass in July, until it was broken by in August by an amphibious landings under Operation Balavegaya.

== Rajiv Gandhi's assassination ==
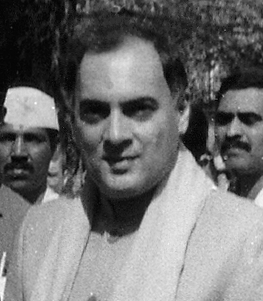
Rajiv Gandhi, former Prime Minister of India

On 21 May 1991, ex-Prime Minister Rajiv Gandhi was assassinated by a female suicide bomber Thenmozhi Rajaratnam. In a Supreme Court of India judgment, by Judge K. T. Thomas, it was found that the killing was carried out due to personal animosity of the LTTE chief Prabhakaran towards Rajiv Gandhi arising from his sending the [IPKF to Sri Lanka and the numerous war crimes perpetrated by IPKF personnel against Sri Lankan Tamils.

== Stalemate ==
Much of 1992, was a stalemate with no major engagements. Both sides engaged in smaller-scale engagements, including ambushes, artillery exchanges, and raids on isolated camps. The LTTE effectively used landmines and booby traps to disrupt army movements in the Vanni region, while the government relied increasingly on air strikes and naval blockades to restrict LTTE logistics and reinforcements. While planning to recapture Jaffna, the Northern Commander Major General Denzil Kobbekaduwa was killed in Kayts with most of his senior commanders, including Brigadier Vijaya Wimalaratne on 8 August by a landmine. Their deaths were a major psychological blow to the Sri Lankan military, as both officers had played crucial roles in the successful Operation Balavegaya that broke the siege of Elephant Pass. The loss of such senior field commanders dealt a setback to military planning and morale, contributing to the overall stagnation of the war during the remainder of 1992.

The LTTE, consolidate its territorial control and rebuild forces after the losses suffered in the previous year's fighting. It expanded training camps in Mullaitivu, Kilinochchi, and Pooneryn, while reorganizing its political and military wings. The LTTE expanded its Sea Tiger naval wing, which began to play an increasingly important role in smuggling arms and engaging government patrol boats. The LTTE had launched a series of attacks on army convoys and police stations in the Eastern Province, particularly in Batticaloa and Ampara, aiming to weaken government control, with the aim to wear down the army through attrition and surprise attacks.

=== Palliyagodella massacre ===
On 15 October 1992, the Liberation Tigers of Tamil Eelam (LTTE) launched an attack on the Muslim village of Palliyagodella in Sri Lanka's Polonnaruwa District. Approximately 200–300 LTTE cadres, including female fighters and child soldiers, assaulted the village in the early hours, killing between 109 and 285 civilians. The massacre was reportedly in retaliation for the villagers' cooperation with government forces, including their participation in the Home Guard and resistance to LTTE extortion. Despite prior requests for protection, the villagers were inadequately armed with shotguns provided by the military, which proved ineffective against the LTTE's assault. The attackers used grenades, machetes, and firearms, targeting mosques and homes, resulting in the deaths of men, women, and children, including pregnant women. The massacre ceased only with the arrival of army helicopters. This atrocity stood as one of the most severe attacks on Muslim civilians during Sri Lanka's civil conflict.

== Government offensives in 1993 ==
In 1993, the government launched several limited offensives Operation Wanni Wickrama and Operation Yal Devi to disrupt LTTE supply routes and regain isolated outposts, but these operations yielded minimal territorial gains.

== Ranasinghe Premadasa's assassination ==
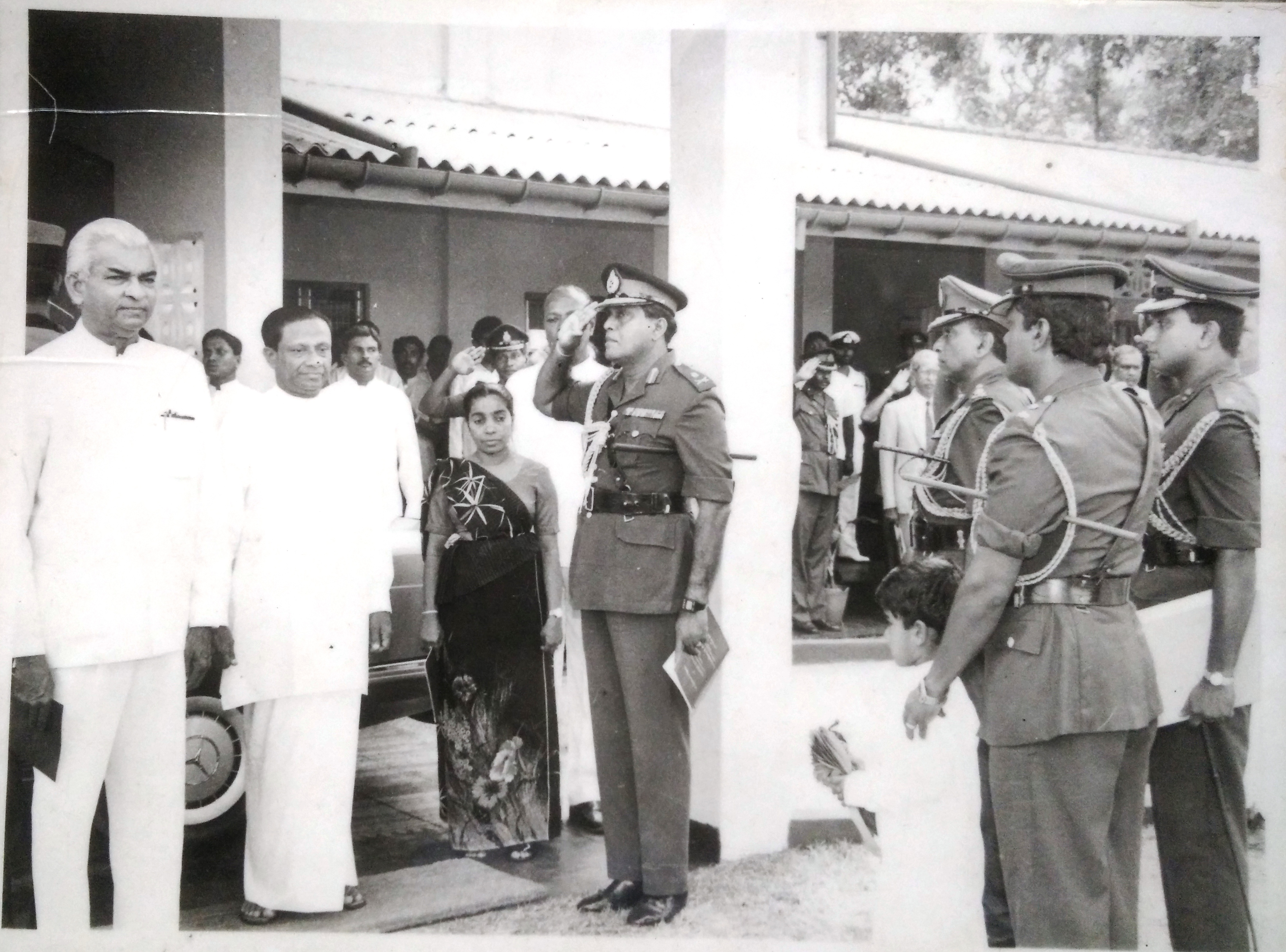
President Ranasinghe Premadasa (center)

President Ranasinghe Premadasa was assassinated on 1 May 1993 during a May Day rally in Colombo. A suicide bomber belonging to the LTTE detonated explosives near the presidential entourage, killing Premadasa and several others instantly. Prime Minister Dingiri Banda Wijetunga succeeded as acting president.

== LTTE offensives in 1993 ==
The LTTE launched several major attacks on government forces, inflicting major losses. In July the LTTE attacked Janakapura and in November they launched a land and sea attack on the government garrison in Pooneryn. In the Battle of Pooneryn lost over 600 troops, forcing a withdrawal from the area, resulting the LTTE expanding is area under its control in the Northern Province. The LTTE's increasing use of sea mines and suicide attacks marked an evolution in its tactics that would later define the conflict's next phase.

== Power swifts and purges ==
=== Intern purge in the LTTE ===
In 1993, a senior LTTE leader Colonel Kittu was killed during a intercept of a LTTE arms ship by the Indian Navy. The LTTE leader purged is second in command Mahattaya and his group in December 1994.

=== Change of Government in Colombo ===
1994 saw major shifts in political landscape in Sri Lanka, with the change of the ruling party in parliamentary elections in August and election of President Chandrika Kumaratunga in November, following a bloody election in which the opposing candidate Gamini Dissanayake was assassinated by a LTTE female suicide bomber. The sea tiger suicide crafts sank the SLNS Sagarawardena the largest ship in the Sri Lankan Navy in September. In October Kumaratunga's government declared a cease fire and reached a cease-fire agreement with the LTTE in January 1995 starting negotiations for a solution to the conflict, marking the end of the Eelam War II.

== See also ==
- Phases of the Sri Lankan Civil War
- Eelam War I
- Eelam War III
- Eelam War IV
- Sri Lankan Civil War
