= G. Yogasangari =

Sri Lankan Tamil politician

Hon. G. Yogasangari MP
- Ganesasangary Yogashangary

Member of Parliament for Jaffna District
- In office 1989–1990
- Preceded by: K. Srinivasan
- Succeeded by: K. Srinivasan

Personal details
- Born: 23 January Sri Lanka, Jaffna
- Died: 19 June 1990 Kodambakam, Madras, India
- Citizenship: British
- Party: Eelam People's Revolutionary Liberation Front
- Occupation: MP
- Profession: Politician
- Ethnicity: Sri Lankan Tamil

Veerasingam Ganeshasangari Yogasangari (died 19 June 1990) was a Sri Lankan Tamil militant, politician and Member of Parliament.

Yogasangari was the son of V. Ganeshasangaree, and nephew of Tamil United Liberation Front politician V. Anandasangaree.

Yogasangari was elected to Parliament in the 1989 parliamentary election as one of the Eelam People's Revolutionary Liberation Front's candidates in Jaffna District.

Yogasangari and other senior members of the EPRLF were assassinated on 19 June 1990 in Kodambakam, Madras, India. The assassination was blamed on the rival rebel Liberation Tigers of Tamil Eelam.
