= Chelvy Thiyagarajah =

Sri Lankan poet and feminist

- Born: 1954; Semamadu, Sri Lanka
- Disappeared: 30 August 1991 (Abducted)
- Status: Found
- Died: 1997 (aged 42–43)
- Cause of death: Execution
- Education: University of Jaffna
- Occupation: Poet

Thiagarajah Selvanithy (Tamil: செல்வநிதி தியாகராசா), also known as Selvi, was a Sri Lankan Eelam poet and a feminist. She was also an International PEN award winner in 1992. In 1991, She was abducted by the LTTE, which acknowledged her execution in 1997.

== Early life ==
Selvi was born into a peasant family in Semamadu, a village about 80 miles south of Jaffna.

== Activism ==
Selvi founded a feminist journal called Tholi and, in her poetry, deplored the carnage brought about by the Sri Lankan civil war. Selvi also produced two plays, one about dowry payments and the other about rapes.

At the time of her kidnapping, Selvi was a third-year student in Theater and Drama Arts in the University of Jaffna.

Selvi received the prestigious ‘Poetry International Award’ from the Poets, Essayists, and Novelists (PEN) organization.

== Abduction ==
On 30 August 1991, Selvi was abducted by the Liberation Tigers of Tamil Eelam or LTTE, a rebel group fighting for independence for minority Sri Lankan Tamil people in Sri Lanka. The day before her abduction she was about to star in a play about the role of women in the Palestinian intifada. She was a prominent member of Poorani Illam, a women's center in Jaffna, which gives support to women traumatized by government bombing raids and bereavement.

== Murder ==
In 1997, LTTE sources acknowledged that she was killed along with another dissident, one Manoharan, also a final-year university student. Although their opposition to the LTTE was non-violent, they were both killed in the LTTE's prison camps.

== See also ==
- Assassinations attributed to LTTE
- Human Rights in Sri Lanka
- Sri Lankan civil war
