= V. M. Panchalingam =

Sri Lankan civil servant (1934–1989)

M. Panchalingam

3rd District Secretary for Jaffna
- In office 14 July 1984 – 1 May 1989
- Preceded by: D. Nesiah
- Succeeded by: Anton Alfred

Personal details
- Born: c. 1934
- Died: 1 May 1989 Nallur, Sri Lanka
- Education: Jaffna Hindu College; Ananda College
- Profession: Civil servant
- Ethnicity: Sri Lankan Tamil

Muthiah Panchalingam (c. 1934 – 1 May 1989) was a Sri Lankan civil servant. He was assassinated by the rebel Liberation Tigers of Tamil Eelam.

== Early life ==
Panchalingam was the son of Muthiah, a businessman from Kandy in central Ceylon. He was educated at Jaffna Hindu College and Ananda College. After school he joined the University of Ceylon, graduating with an honours BSc degree in chemistry.

== Career ==
After university Panchalingam worked as a research officer in the Rubber Research Institute before joining the Ceylon Civil Service in 1957 a District Land Officer. He served in Mannar, Kandy and Vavuniya. He was later Assistant Government Agent and Additional Government Agent (1979) in Jaffna. He became District Secretary for Jaffna District in 1984.

== Death ==
Panchalingam was shot dead on 1 May 1989 at his brother's house in Nallur. A youth with an AK-47 rifle had fired 23 bullets into Panchalingam's body, eight into his head. The rebel Liberation Tigers of Tamil Eelam claimed responsibility for Panchalingam's killing.
