= Shankar (Tamil militant) =

Sri Lanakan rebel (1949–2001)

Colonel Shankar
- சங்கர்
- Born: Vaithilingam Sornalingam; September 1949; Sri Lanka
- Died: 26 September 2001 (aged 51–52); Sri Lanka
- Other name: Mukilan
- Known for: Founder and leader of the air wing and marine division of the Liberation Tigers of Tamil Eelam

Vaithilingam Sornalingam (September 1949 – 26 September 2001; Tamil: வைத்தியலிங்கம் சொர்ணலிங்கம், alternative spellings include Vythilingam Sornalingam; often referred to by his nom de guerre Colonel Shankar) was the founder of the air wing and marine division of the Liberation Tigers of Tamil Eelam (LTTE) and a relative of the militant group's leader Velupillai Prabhakaran.

He was educated in Sri Lanka, and worked for some time in Canada before returning to Sri Lanka and joining the LTTE.

== Early life ==
Sornalingam was born in September 1949, the second of six sons. He studied at the Tamil Maha Vidyalayam in Vanni and later as a boarding student at Hartley College in Point Pedro, Sri Lanka between 1959 and 1969. While there, he lived in Thamotheram House, and proved himself a talented sportsman, representing the college in cricket and football.

He then went on to the Hindustan Institute of Engineering Technology in Chennai, where he studied aeronautical engineering. Some time after completing his studies, he moved to Montreal, Quebec, Canada, where he worked for Air Canada; while there, he was known to have become involved with the LTTE as early as 1973.

Though he did not formally become a member of the LTTE at that time, he assisted in setting up their Office of Overseas Purchases, which was responsible for acquiring communications equipment, ships, radar, and armaments.

== LTTE membership ==
From Montreal, Sornalingam moved to Chennai in July 1983, and from there went back to Sri Lanka; upon his return, he chose to become a full time member of the LTTE, and began his rise through the ranks.

He participated in a gun battle near the Tamil Information Centre in Chennai in 1985 in which he and his colleagues kidnapped the People's Liberation Organisation of Tamil Eelam military commander Kannan. Kannan was later exchanged by the LTTE for Pottu Amman, who had been kidnapped earlier by the PLOTE.

During these years, three of his brothers who were involved with the LTTE died: Manoharan committed suicide by cyanide after his capture by the Sri Lankan navy; Vaseekaran, alias "Lieutenant Siddharth", died in a bomb blast when preparing for an attack in Mannar and a third brother was arrested by Sri Lankan forces and presumed dead after no further news was heard of him. In 2000, Sornalingam accompanied Prabhakaran in his meeting with Norwegian envoy Erik Solheim, acting as an interpreter; he and political wing leader S. P. Thamilselvan were the only ones whom Prabhakaran trusted closely enough to accompany him to that meeting.

== Death ==
Sornalingam was killed by a claymore mine on 26 September 2001 at around 10:45 AM in the jungle near Vanni, while driving alone from Oddusuddan to Puthukkudiyiruppu.

Sornalingam's killing was part of a series of attempts around the same time on the lives of LTTE leaders, including Gangai Amaran and S. P. Thamilselvan.

An LTTE press release a few hours after his death attributed the attack to a special deep penetration unit of the Sri Lankan army, and claimed that the date of his killing had been chosen deliberately to coincide with the anniversary of the death of Thileepan, who had died 14 years earlier in a hunger strike protesting the policies of the Sri Lankan government and the Indian Peace Keeping Force.

Government newspapers denied the LTTE's charges and instead attributed the attacks to an alleged internal power struggle in the LTTE. His funeral was held at the Great Heroes' Commemorative Hall in Mulliyawalai; he is survived by his elder brother, a doctor in the United Kingdom.

The book ATM Interworking in Broadband Wireless Applications was also dedicated in his memory.
