= Kanagapuram =

Kanagapuram கனகபுரம் කනගපුර
- Town
- Location within Northern Province
- Coordinates: 9°23′29″N 80°23′27″E
- Country: Sri Lanka
- Province: Northern
- District: Kilinochchi
- DS Division: Karachchi

Population (2001)
  - Total: 21,500
- Time zone: UTC+5:30 (Sri Lanka Standard Time Zone)

Kanagapuram or Kanakapuram is a town in Kilinochchi District, Sri Lanka. Famous Kaala Vairavar Temple is situated in Kangapuram.
