= S. Shanmuganathan (Sri Lankan politician) =

Sri Lankan Tamil politician and MP (1960–1998)

Honourable S. Shanmuganathan MP

Member of Parliament for Vanni District
- In office 1994–1998

Personal details
- Born: 16 May 1960
- Died: 15 July 1998 (aged 38)
- Party: Democratic People's Liberation Front
- Other political affiliations: People's Liberation Organisation of Tamil Eelam
- Ethnicity: Sri Lankan Tamil

Sarawanabavanandan Shanmuganathan (16 May 1960 – 15 July 1998; known as Vasanthan) was a Sri Lankan Tamil militant, politician and Member of Parliament.

Shanmuganathan was born on 16 May 1960. He was a Hindu. He was a senior member of the militant People's Liberation Organisation of Tamil Eelam, serving as its commander in Vavuniya.

Shanmuganathan was member of Vavuniya Urban Council. He contested the 1994 parliamentary election as one of the Democratic People's Liberation Front's candidates in Vanni District and was elected to Parliament.

Shanmuganathan was killed by a claymore mine in Irambaikkulam, Vavuniya District on 15 July 1998. The assassination was blamed on the rival rebel Liberation Tigers of Tamil Eelam. However, the pro-LTTE TamilNet claimed that Shanmuganathan had been the victim of an internal conflict within the PLOTE.
