= Relangi Selvarajah =

Sri Lankan Tamil broadcaster

Relangi Selvarajah (1960 – 12 August 2005) was a popular Tamil broadcaster and a one time actress. She was assassinated by unknown assailants on 12 August in Colombo, Sri Lanka.

== Biography ==
Relangi was born in Jaffna to minority Sri Lankan Tamil parents and grew up in Jaffna. She was married to Sinnadurai Selvarajah who was also killed along with her. Although both husband and wife were of Tamil ethnicity they were shot allegedly by LTTE. The couple had a girl who was less than one year old when the parents were killed.

== Career in journalism ==
In 1987 she joined the Sri Lanka Broadcasting Corporation (SLBC) and was working as a senior announcer since 2000. Later she worked as an announcer and news reader in Sri Lanka Rupavahini Corporation (SLRC). At the time of her death was working as a freelancer in SLRC. She was the announcer Uthaya Darisanam program on every Sunday at 9:00 a.m to 10:30 a.m. She started her career as an announcer in Jaffna Manikkural local broadcasting service from 1979 to 1983. She was named the best actress for her part in the locally made Tamil language film Theivam thantha Veedu in 1978. Local newspapers also reported that Selvarajah also produced the SLBC program Ithaya Veenai, a program known for criticizing the main rebel group LTTE, and allegedly funded by the opposition Tamil political party, the Eelam People's Democratic Party.

== Death ==
Relangi and her husband, a political activist, were killed by unidentified gunmen in Colombo on the same day that Lakshman Kadirgamar, Sri Lanka's foreign minister, was assassinated. Political leaders blamed the rebel Liberation Tigers of Tamil Eelam or LTTE for all three killings, charges the LTTE denied.

The attackers shot Selvarajah, 44, and her husband, Sinnadurai, in the office where they ran a travel agency. Sri Lanka's The Sunday Times reported that the LTTE had criticized Selvarajah for broadcasting anti-LTTE programs.

Selvarajah's husband was affiliated with the formerly militant and now mainstream group, the People's Liberation Organization of Tamil Eelam PLOTE, according to local news reports and sources. PLOTE was critical of the LTTE; the LTTE accused PLOTE for attacking its members, according to The Associated Press. Sri Lanka's Daily Mirror (Sri Lanka) quoted police as saying that they suspected the couple may have been murdered because of Selvarajah's anti-LTTE programs.

== See also ==
- Sri Lankan civil war
