= Pottuvil Electoral District =

Former electoral district in Sri Lanka

Coordinates: 6.8733°N 81.8325°E

Pottuvil electoral district was an electoral district of Sri Lanka between August 1947 and February 1989. The district was named after the town of Pottuvil in Ampara District, Eastern Province. The district was a two-member constituency between July 1977 and February 1989. The 1978 Constitution of Sri Lanka introduced the proportional representation electoral system for electing members of Parliament. The existing 160 mainly single-member electoral districts were replaced with 22 multi-member electoral districts. Pottuvil electoral district was replaced by the Ampara (Amparai) multi-member electoral district at the 1989 general elections, the first under the PR system, though Pottuvil continues to be a polling division of the multi-member electoral district.

== Members of Parliament ==
Key

Independent ITAK UNP

Election	Member	Party	Term
1947	M. M. Ebrahim	Ind.	1947-1956
1952	M. M. Ebrahim	Ind.	1947-1956
1956	M. M. Mustapha	ITAK	1956-1960
1960 (March)	M. A. Abdul Majeed	Ind.	1960-1970
1960 (July)	M. A. Abdul Majeed	Ind.	1960-1970
1965	M. A. Abdul Majeed	Ind.	1960-1970
1970	M. A. Abdul Majeed	UNP	1970-1977
1977	A. M. Mohamed Jalaldeen	UNP	1977-1989

== Elections ==
=== 1947 Parliamentary General Election ===
Results of the 1st parliamentary election held between 23 August 1947 and 20 September 1947 for the district:

Candidate	Party	Symbol	Votes	%
M. M. Ebrahim	Independent	Pair of Scales	7,407	55.92
A. R. A. Razik	United National Party	Lamp	5,508	41.59
Valid Votes			12,915	97.51
Rejected Votes			330	2.49
Total Polled			13,245	100.00
Registered Electors			18,164	
Turnout				72.92

=== 1952 Parliamentary General Election ===
Results of the 2nd parliamentary election held between 24 May 1952 and 30 May 1952 for the district:

Candidate	Party	Symbol	Votes	%
M. M. Ebrahim	Independent	Pair of Scales	8,093	51.21
M. M. Mustapha		Star	7,534	47.67
Valid Votes			15,627	98.88
Rejected Votes			177	1.12
Total Polled			15,804	100.00
Registered Electors			21,187	
Turnout				74.59

=== 1956 Parliamentary General Election ===
Results of the 3rd parliamentary election held between 5 April 1956 and 10 April 1956 for the district:

Candidate	Party	Symbol	Votes	%
M. M. Mustapha	Federal Party	House	8,355	51.81
M. I. M. Abdul Majeed		Chair	4,626	28.69
M. F. Abdul Jawad		Umbrella	2,944	18.25
Valid Votes			15,925	98.75
Rejected Votes			201	1.25
Total Polled			16,126	100.00
Registered Electors			25,273	
Turnout				63.81

=== 1960 (March) Parliamentary General Election ===
Results of the 4th parliamentary election held on 19 March 1960 for the district:

Candidate	Party	Symbol	Votes	%
M. A. Abdul Majeed	Independent	Cockerel	9,874	70.01
M. F. Abdul Jawad		Umbrella	2,138	15.16
V. Sandrasegara		Ladder	1,910	13.54
Valid Votes			13,922	98.72
Rejected Votes			181	1.28
Total Polled			14,103	100.00
Registered Electors			18,250	
Turnout				77.28

=== 1960 (July) Parliamentary General Election ===
Results of the 5th parliamentary election held on 20 July 1960 for the district:

Candidate	Party	Symbol	Votes	%
M. A. Abdul Majeed	Independent	Radio Set	11,591	92.37
M. Z. K. M. Kariapper	All Ceylon Islamic United Front	Sun	837	6.67
Valid Votes			12,428	99.04
Rejected Votes			121	0.96
Total Polled			12,549	100.00
Registered Electors			18,250	
Turnout				68.76

=== 1965 Parliamentary General Election ===
Results of the 6th parliamentary election held on 22 March 1965 for the district:

Candidate	Party	Symbol	Votes	%
M. A. Abdul Majeed	Independent	Radio Set	6,768	34.89
N. Tharmalingam		Cockerel	5,296	27.30
Y. M. Mustapha		Pair of Scales	3,217	16.58
U. M. Sulaimalebbe		Elephant	2,911	15.00
M. S. Cader	Federal Party	House	871	4.49
B. A. Lal Wijewardhana		Cart Wheel	153	0.79
Valid Votes			19,216	99.05
Rejected Votes			185	0.95
Total Polled			19,401	100.00
Registered Electors			23,586	
Turnout				82.26

=== 1970 Parliamentary General Election ===
Results of the 7th parliamentary election held on 27 May 1970 for the district:

Candidate	Party	Symbol	Votes	%
M. A. Abdul Majeed	United National Party	Elephant	10,610	41.92
Tharumalingam Nadarajah		Cockerel	9,335	36.88
M. I. Abdul Jabbar		Hand	5,209	20.58
Valid Votes			25,154	99.39
Rejected Votes			155	0.61
Total Polled			25,309	100.00
Registered Electors			28,282	
Turnout				89.49

=== 1977 Parliamentary General Election ===
Results of the 8th parliamentary election held on 21 July 1977 for the district:

Candidate	Party	Symbol	Votes	%
A. M. Mohamed Jalaldeen	United National Party	Elephant	30,315	33.73
M. Canagaratnam	Tamil United Liberation Front	Sun	23,990	26.69
M. M. Mustapha	Sri Lanka Freedom Party	Hand	22,378	24.90
Nadarajah Dharmalingam		Clock	7,644	8.51
Seyed Ahamed Moulana		Radio	2,902	3.23
P. M. S. Jananayake		Lamp	1,458	1.62
S. L. Abdul Sathar		Star	272	0.30
Valid Votes			88,959	98.99
Rejected Votes			912	1.01
Total Polled			89,871	100.00
Registered Electors			49,691	
Turnout				180.86

In December 1977 M. Canagaratnam defected to the United National Party.
