= Kiran, Sri Lanka =

Kiran கிரான் කිරාන්
- Town
- Location within Sri Lanka
- Coordinates: 7°52′0″N 81°32′0″E
- Country: Sri Lanka
- Province: Eastern
- District: Batticaloa
- DS Division: Koralai Pattu South

Kiran (Tamil: கிரான் Kirāṉ) is a town in the Batticaloa District of Sri Lanka. It is located 25 km north-west of the district capital Batticaloa.
