= Lucky Wijayaratne =

Sri Lankan Army general

Major General Lakshman Wijayaratne † RWP, RSP
- Lucky Wijayaratne in Brigadier insignia
- Born: 30 October 1944; Galle, Sri Lanka
- Died: 18 December 1990 (aged 46); Trincomalee, Sri Lanka
- Military career
- Allegiance: Sri Lanka
- Branch: Sri Lanka Army
- Rank: Major General
- Nickname: Lucky
- Unit: Sri Lanka Light Infantry
- Commands: 22nd Trincomalee Brigade Commander
- Conflicts: Sri Lankan Civil War; 1971 Insurrection; 1987–89 JVP Insurrection
- Awards: Rana Wickrama Padakkama; Rana Sura Padakkama; Vadamarachchi Operation Medal; Purna Bhumi Padakkama; President’s Medal

Major General Chulabhaya Lakshman 'Lucky' Wijayaratne RWP, RSP, M.Sc, LI was a Sri Lankan army officer, who was one of the most distinguished generals in the Sri Lanka army. Major General Wijayaratne died on 18 December 1990 at the 10th milepost along Trincomalee-Anuradhapura road due to a landmine explosion. He was the commander of 22 brigade based in Trincomalee at the time of his death and played a pivotal role in the government’s counter-terrorism offensive in the district. Major General Wijayaratne was the senior most Sri Lankan military officer to die from a LTTE attack up to that time.

== Early life and career ==
Lucky Wijayaratne was born on 30 October 1944 to a well respected family in Galle and his father was a reputed ayurvedic physician in the area. He was educated at Mahinda College, Galle, where he was a member of the school Cadet Corps. After finishing the school education he opted for the military service on 26 March 1964, after joining the Sri Lanka Army as a Cadet Officer in the Sri Lanka Military Academy. After completing the initial training successfully he was proceeded to the Pakistan Military Academy for advanced training. He followed many military courses, both in Sri Lanka and overseas and his high performance levels at those military training centres earned him a scholarship for postgraduate studies (MSc.) in Strategic Warfare at Aberdeen University in Scotland.

During his military career, he began to perform well since the early days he joined as a commissioned officer in the Sri Lanka Light Infantry. After he was promoted to the rank of Lieutenant Colonel on 20 July 1985, he had the opportunity to serve as the Commandant of Infantry Training School at Minneriya, Staff Officer-I at Joint Operations Headquarters, Coordinating Officer for Uva, Matara and Trincomalee, Commanding Officer, 1 SLLI, etc. Lucky Wijayaratne was an officer who believed in strict discipline, commitment and dedication to achieve success in all assignments. He was well endowed with a keen foresight which helped him to pre-empt many possible impending enemy attacks with the operations he carefully planned and carried out in the battlefield, specially against the LTTE.

== Death ==
The Tamil Tigers always felt the heat of his strong presence in the east and treated him as a threat to their activities in the Eastern province. Although they could not take his life in several planned attacks, one of the deadly landmine blasts of the LTTE took the life of Lakshman Wijayaratne on 18 December 1990, while he was serving as the Area Commander of the 22 Brigade in Trincomalee. Major General Lakshman Wijayaratne, Police Superintendent Richard Wijesekara and six army soldiers were killed, when the vehicle they traveled was hit by a LTTE land mine at Morayaya along Trincomalee-Anuradhapura road. They were returning from a refugee camp near Horowupatana in Tricomalee, where they had met with refugees to ask them to return to their villages after LTTE had been driven out of the area.

== Awards ==

	Rana Wickrama Padakkama	Rana Sura Padakkama
Purna Bhumi Padakkama	Vadamarachchi Operation Medal	President's Inauguration Medal

Major General Lakshman Wijayaratne was awarded with several medals and decorations by the government of Sri Lanka and Sri Lanka Army, including Rana Wickrama Padakkama (RWP), Rana Sura Padakkama (RSP), Vadamarachchi Operation Medal, Purna Bhumi Medal and President’s Medal to commemorate his valuable dedication and service to the country.

== See also ==
- Eelam War I
- Eelam War II
