= Kumaraswamy Nandagopan =

Sri Lankan rebel (1976–2008)

Kumaraswamy Nanthakopan (Tamil: குமாரசுவாமி நந்தகோபன்; 1976 – November 14, 2008), also known as his nom de guerre Ragu, was the president of the political party of the Tamil Makkal Viduthalai Pulikal in Sri Lanka, a defecting offshoot of the LTTE and advisor to Sivanesathurai Chandrakanthan. He was a staunch Pillaiyan loyalist, and his appointment as TMVP president was opposed by Karuna. He was shot and killed near Colombo by suspected LTTE gunmen on Friday November 14, 2008.
