= Lakshman Algama =

Sri Lanka Army general

Chulasoka Lakshman Algama † ලක්ෂ්මන් අල්ගම
- Born: 2 June 1940; Kelaniya, Sri Lanka
- Died: 18 December 1999 (aged 59); Ja-Ela, Sri Lanka
- Military career
- Allegiance: Sri Lanka
- Branch: Sri Lanka Army
- Service years: 1963–1995
- Rank: Major General
- Nickname: Lucky
- Commands: Chief of Staff; Commander Security Forces Headquarters East (SF HQ (E))
- Conflicts: 1971 Insurrection, Insurrection 1987-89, Sri Lankan Civil War
- Awards: Vishista Seva Vibhushanaya; Uttama Seva Padakkama
- Other work: United National Party activist

Major General Chulasoka Lakshman "Lucky" Algama, VSV, USP, ndc, psc (2 June 1940 – 18 December 1999) was a Sri Lankan army general. He was a former Chief of Staff of the Sri Lanka Army and a United National Party activist after retirement.

== Education ==
Educated at Ananda College, Colombo, Algama graduated from the University of Ceylon, Peradeniya.

== Military career ==
He was commissioned in the Ceylon Army on 10 May 1963 as a second lieutenant in the 1st Battalion, Gemunu Watch. He served with the 3rd (Volunteer) Battalion, Gemunu Watch, Army Headquarters, Ministry of Defence, Mullaithivu and Trincomalee Districts; having been promoted to the ranks of Lieutenant in 1964, Captain in 1967, Major in 1974 and was promoted to Lieutenant Colonel in 1981. He was appointed first commanding officer of the 4th Battalion, Gemunu Watch on 27 December 1985 and served till 31 October 1986. In 1986, he was promoted to colonel and served as Colonel General Staff at Army Headquarters. Promoted to Brigadier, he was appointed brigade commander, 13 Brigade, thereafter military secretary. In 1989, he served as deputy to Major General Cecil Waidyaratne in Operation Combine which effectively subdued the Insurrection 1987-89. Attending National Defence College, India and was appointed the regimental commandant in 1990; deputy general officer commanding, 2 Division in 1991. In 1992, he was promoted to major general, he was appointed general officer commanding, 3 Division. In 1994, he was appointed Chief of Staff of Army and served till his resignation on 2 June 1995.

Algama held several key posts in the army including commander of Security Forces Headquarters East (SF HQ (E)) and was responsible for enabling the government to hold elections in the eastern province in 1993.

== Assassination ==
He was killed in a suicide bombing that killed twelve people and injured another seven at a political rally in Ja-Ela, Colombo. According to some eyewitness accounts, the suspected suicide bomber had moved in the direction of Algama and triggered off the explosion. The Sri Lankan government claimed that he was killed by an LTTE suicide bomber.

== See also ==
- List of attacks attributed to the LTTE
- Notable assassinations of the Sri Lankan Civil War
- Sri Lankan Civil War
