= C. V. Gunaratne =

Sri Lankan politician

Hon. C. V. Gunaratne
- සී. වී. ගුණරත්න

Minister of Industrial Development
- In office 1994 – 2000
- President: Chandrika Kumaratunga
- Prime Minister: Sirimavo Bandaranaike

Member of Parliament for Colombo District
- In office 1989–2000

Personal details
- Died: June 7, 2000 Rathmalana, Sri Lanka
- Party: Sri Lanka Freedom Party
- Education: Royal College, Colombo

Clement Victor Gunaratne (Sinhala: ක්ලෙමෙන්ට් වික්ටර් ගුණරත්න) was Sri Lanka's Cabinet Minister of Industries Development. He and his wife along with 20 others were killed by a suicide bomber of the LTTE organization on 7 June 2000.

He was educated at the Royal College, Colombo where was captain of the rugby team. His father was Major L. V. Gooneratne, ED, CCC the first Mayor of Dehiwala - Mt Lavinia He entered politics as a member of the Dehiwala-Mount Lavinia Municipal Council in which he was Leader of the Opposition (Sri Lanka Freedom Party). He was chosen as a Central Committee Member of the SLFP in early 1970s and was elected to parliament in the parliamentary general election held in 1989.

== See also ==
- Notable assassinations of the Sri Lankan Civil War
- List of attacks attributed to the LTTE
- Sri Lankan Civil War
