= Selliah Parameswaran Kurukkal =

Selliah Parameshwaram Kurukkal (Tamil: செல்லைய்யா பரமேஸ்வர குருக்கள்; died February 7, 2007) was the Chief Pujari of the Santhiveli Pilleyar Kovil. He became famous after blessing Mahinda Rajapakse, Prime Minister of Sri Lanka. He was murdered four days afterwards. According to the Sri Lankan Army, he was killed by the LTTE. The LTTE contends that Kurukkal was murdered by Sri Lankan paramilitary forces.
