= Clancy Fernando =

Sri Lankan Navy admiral (1938–1992)

Admiral W.W.E. Clancy Fernando † VSV, USP
- Admiral Clancy Fernando
- Born: Wannakuwatta Waduge Erwin Clancy Fernando; 10 October 1938
- Died: 16 November 1992 (aged 54); Colombo, Sri Lanka
- Military career
- Allegiance: Sri Lanka
- Branch: Sri Lanka Navy
- Service years: 1957–1992
- Rank: Admiral
- Commands: Commander of the Sri Lankan Navy
- Conflicts: Sri Lankan Civil War
- Awards: Vishista Seva Vibhushanaya; Uttama Seva Padakkama

Admiral Wannakuwatta Waduge Erwin Clancy Fernando VSV, USP, MNI (In Sinhalese: ක්ලැන්සි ෆර්නැන්ඩෝ; 10 October 1938 – 16 November 1992) was a senior Sri Lanka Navy officer. He served as the Commander of the Sri Lanka Navy from 1 November 1991 to 16 November 1992, when he was assassinated by the LTTE he was the most senior officer in the Sri Lankan armed forces to be killed in the line of duty.

== Early life and education ==
Born on 10 October 1938, Fernando was educated at Prince of Wales' College, Moratuwa, where he was a member of the team Western Band.

== Naval career ==
He joined the Royal Ceylon Navy on 17 December 1957 as a cadet officer. After completing five months of basic training, he proceeded for officer training at Britannia Royal Naval College in Dartmouth, United Kingdom. After one year of training, he was promoted to Midshipman on 1 May 1959. On completion of his training at Dartmouth in July 1960, he was commissioned as an Acting Sub Lieutenant and returned to Ceylon. He was assigned as First Lieutenant to HMCyS Aliya which was part of HMCyS Coastal Forces. From 1963 to 1964 he was the commanding officer of the short patrol boat, HMCyS Diyakawa. He serves with the Royal Ceylon Navy in Trincomalee, Tangalle and Karainagar, serving on board HMCyS Gajabahu, the flagship of the fleet.

He introduced the Sinhala communication system into the navy and authored the book on ‘Customs and etiquettes of Services’. With the introduction of Shanghai Class Fast Gun Boats in to the navy, Lieutenant Commander Fernando served as the commanding officer of SLNS Ranakamee from 1972 to 1973 and then commanded the Shershen-class torpedo boat SLNS Samudra Devi, which was the flagship of the fleet in 1980. In 1977, he attended Defence Services Staff College, Wellington. Promoted to the rank of Commander in March 1978, he was the Commanding Officer of the SLNS Tissa and thereafter SLNS Elara, and served as the Master of the Ceylon Shipping Corporations MV Lanka Kanthi. Fernando was held the memberships of the British Institute of Management, and the Nautical Institute and had obtained a master's degree in defence studies. He had also been conferred with the certificate of Master Mariners and was the first President of Sri Lanka Branch of the Nautical Institute.

On 30 June 1983, he was appointed Director Naval Operations. Promoted the rank of Captain on 1 January 1984, he was appointed Commandant of the Naval and Maritime Academy. He was promoted to Commodore in July 1986 and served as Commander Western Naval Area, Commander Eastern Naval Area, and Security Forces Commander, Trincomalee. In 1987, he attended the National Defence College in New Delhi. In 1991, he was promoted to the rank of rear admiral and held the post of the Chief of Staff of the navy, shortly he was promoted to the rank of vice admiral on appointment to the office of the Commander of the Sri Lanka Navy on 1 November 1991. After becoming navy commander he intensified naval operations against the LTTE, effectively denying the terrorist free use of the sea. He pioneered small boat operations, initially in the Kilali lagoon in Jaffna which later evolved in the Special Boat Squadron and the Rapid Action Boat Squadron in later decades. The navy under took in landing the army in its first amphibious operation Operation Balavegaya in 1991.

== Assassination ==
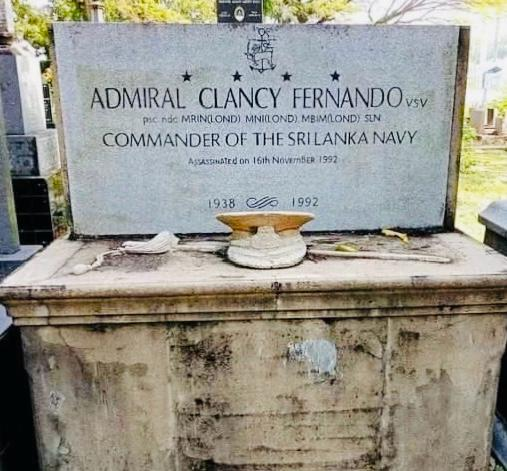
Grave of Clancy Fernando

He was assassinated by a LTTE suicide bomber who drove an explosives laden motorbike into his staff car on the 16 November 1992 at 8.35 a.m, in front of the Galle Face Green. Killed in the bombing was Lieutenant (posthumously lieutenant-commander) Sandun Gunasekera, his flag lieutenant and his driver. He was on his way to naval headquarters at Flagstaff Street in the Galle Buck from his official residence "Navy House" at Longden Place, Colombo after he returned from India after discussing Indo-Sri Lankan naval cooperation. Admiral Fernando's assassination took place soon after the death of LTTE Sea Tiger leader Charles at the hands of a navy patrol launched from Nagathevanthurai.

== Honors ==
He was posthumously promoted to admiral and awarded the Vishista Seva Vibhushanaya and the Uttama Seva Padakkama. While in service he had received the Sri Lanka Armed Services Long Service Medal and Clasp, Republic of Sri Lanka Armed Services Medal, Ceylon Armed Services Long Service Medal and Clasp, Purna Bhumi Padakkama, President's Inauguration Medal and the Sri Lanka Navy 25th Anniversary Medal.

== Family ==
He was married to Monica Fernando and had two sons, Nishan and Dinukh and a daughter, Sashi.

== Legacy ==
In Sid Meier's Civilization VI, players can recruit Fernando as a Great Admiral.

== See also ==
- Sri Lanka Navy
- List of assassinations of the Sri Lankan Civil War
- List of attacks attributed to the LTTE
- Sri Lankan Civil War

Military offices
Preceded by H. A. Silva	Commander of the Sri Lankan Navy; 1991-1992 †	Succeeded by D. A. M. R. Samarasekara
