= Uma Maheswaran =

Sri Lankan Tamil militant (1945–1989)

- உமாமகேசுவரன்
- Born: K. Nallainathan; 18 February 1945
- Died: 16 July 1989 (aged 44); Colombo, Sri Lanka
- Cause of death: Assassination
- Other name: Mukundan
- Occupation: Surveyor
- Years active: 1977–1989
- Organization(s): Liberation Tigers of Tamil Eelam (1977–1980); People's Liberation Organisation of Tamil Eelam (1980–1989)

Kadirgamapillai (Kathirkamar) Nallainathan (Tamil: க. உமாமகேசுவரன்; 18 February 1945 – 16 July 1989; commonly known by the nom de guerre Uma Maheswaran) was a Sri Lankan Tamil rebel and the founder and leader of the People's Liberation Organisation of Tamil Eelam (PLOTE), a separatist Tamil militant organisation in Sri Lanka.

== Early life ==
Maheswaran was born on 18 February 1945 and was from Varuthalaivilan near Tellippalai in northern Sri Lanka. He worked for the government as a surveyor.

== LTTE ==
Maheswaran joined the militant Liberation Tigers of Tamil Eelam (LTTE) in 1977. The LTTE gave him the nom de guerre Mukundan. He was chairman of the LTTE's central committee from 1977 to 1980. He received military training in Lebanon and Syria. Maheswaran and LTTE leader V. Prabhakaran were blamed for the shooting of MP M. Canagaratnam on 24 January 1978. In 1982 A Sri Lankan court sentenced Maheswaran, in absentia, to 15 years rigorous imprisonment for the attempted murder.

Maheswaran fell out with Prabhakaran and left the organisation in 1980.

== PLOTE ==
After leaving the LTTE, Maheswaran founded his own militant group, the People's Liberation Organisation of Tamil Eelam (PLOTE).

On the night of 19 May 1982, Maheswaran and fellow PLOTE members Jotheeswaran and Sivaneswaran (Nirnajan) were involved in a shootout with Prabhakaran and Raghavan (Sivakumar) of the LTTE at the Pondy bazaar in Thiyagarayanagar, Madras, India. Jotheeswaran was injured and hospitalised but Maheswaran and Sivaneswaran escaped. Maheswaran was arrested near Gummidipoondi railway station on 25 May 1982 after a shoot out with the police but was later released on bail. Maheswaran and the PLOTE would continue to carry out bank robberies and kidnappings to finance their activities.

Maheswaran's actions eventually led to divisions within the PLOTE, resulting in a number of defections and splinter groups to be formed, including the Eelam National Democratic Liberation Front (ENDLF). Maheswaran was known to deal with dissent very harshly, and is alleged to have carried out 38 murders.

Maheswaran was involved in the failed 1988 Maldives Coup. On 16 July 1989, Maheswaran was abducted by six men in Colombo. His bullet ridden body was later found at Frankfurt Place, Bambalapitiya, near the Maldivian High Commission. The ENDLF, an Indian-backed offshoot of PLOTE, claimed responsibility for the assassination, however some sources blamed the assassination on dissenting members of the PLOTE itself.
