= Mahattaya =

Tamil militant (1956–1994)

Gopalaswamy Mahendraraja
- Born: 1956; Point Pedro, Ceylon
- Died: 28 December 1994 (aged 37–38); Sri Lanka
- Cause of death: Executed by the LTTE
- Other name: Mahattaya
- Occupation: Tamil Militant
- Known for: High treason Death of Col Kittu

Gopalaswamy Mahendraraja (1956 – 28 December 1994), also known as Mahattaya, was a member of Liberation Tigers of Tamil Eelam who was killed for leaking secrets to India's RAW.

== Personal Life ==
Gopalaswamy Mahendraraja was related to Velupillai Prabhakaran, former LTTE leader. He was born in Point Pedro.

== LTTE ==
Mahattaya joined the LTTE in 1978. In 1987 he became the deputy leader of the LTTE, and in 1989 he became the head of the short-lived People's Front of Liberation Tigers, a political party founded by the LTTE. Mahattaya was the person who was leading most of the attacks done by LTTE when Prabhakaran was in India until 1986. Mahattaya was sent to Jaffna by Prabhakaran to inquire into the conflict matters that arose between LTTE and the University of Jaffna, in 1986, when a university student Vijetharan was kidnapped and killed by the Kittu group. Prabhakaran returned to Jaffna at the end of 1986. Mahattaya was second-in-command in the LTTE, at one time.

Athira, accused 18 in Rajiv Gandhi Assassination case confessed that she was ordered to collect intelligence in Tamil Nadu and hand it over to Mahattaya. Several investigative journalists proposed that Mahattaya might be the main Conspirator in Rajiv Gandhi Assassination, possibly worked as a mercenary.

Velupillai Prabhakaran and Pottu Amman found out that he was leaking information to India's RAW, which helped the Indian Peace Keeping Forces (IPKF) destroy LTTE bases. Mahattaya group was famous for doing all well planned attacks. In 1993, the LTTE took him into custody. He was executed on 28 December 1994, by the LTTE.
