= M. Canagaratnam =

Sri Lankan Tamil politician and Member of Parliament

Hon. M. Canagaratnam

Member of Parliament for Pottuvil
- In office 1977–1980
- Succeeded by: Ranganayaki Pathmanathan

Personal details
- Born: 15 April 1924
- Died: 20 April 1980 (aged 56)
- Party: United National Party
- Ethnicity: Sri Lankan Tamil

Mylvaganam Canagaratnam (15 April 1924 – 20 April 1980) was a Sri Lankan Tamil politician and Member of Parliament.

Canagaratnam stood as the Tamil United Liberation Front's candidate for Pottuvil at the 1977 parliamentary election. He came second and entered Parliament as the second member for Pottuvil. In December 1977, he defected to the United National Party-led government and was rewarded by being appointed District Minister for Batticaloa.

Canagaratnam was shot outside his home in Kollupitiya, Colombo on 24 January 1978. The attack was blamed on V. Prabhakaran and Uma Maheswaran of the Liberation Tigers of Tamil Eelam. He died of his injuries on 20 April 1980.

== See also ==
- List of members of the Sri Lankan Parliament who died in office
