= Anton Balasingham =

Sri Lankan journalist

Voice of the Nation Anton Balasingham
- அன்ரன் பாலசிங்கம்
- Balasingham in June 2006
- Born: A. B. Stanislaus; 4 March 1938
- Died: 14 December 2006 (aged 68); London, United Kingdom
- Education: South Bank Polytechnic
- Occupation: Journalist
- Spouse: Adele Ann Wilby

Anton Balasingham Stanislaus (Tamil: அன்ரன் பாலசிங்கம் சிடானிசுலாசு, romanized: Āṇṭaṉ Pālaciṅkam Ciṭāṉisulās; 4 March 1938 – 14 December 2006) was a Sri Lankan journalist, rebel and chief political strategist and chief negotiator for the Liberation Tigers of Tamil Eelam, a separatist Tamil militant organisation in Sri Lanka.

== Early life and family ==
Balasingham was born on 4 March 1938. His father was an electrical foreman from Mandur in eastern Ceylon and his mother was a midwife from Jaffna in northern Ceylon who met whilst they were both working at Batticaloa Hospital. Balasingham's paternal grandfather was a Hindu priest.

Balasingham's parents separated and following his father's death, Balasingham along with his mother and sister moved to Karaveddy. The family lived in a rented house and his mother worked as a midwife at the Ambam clinic. Balasingham was educated at Sacred Heart College, Karaveddy and Nelliady Central College.

Balasingham was raised a Roman Catholic, the religion of his mother, but as he grew up he became a rationalist and agnostic. He was also attracted to leftist politics which had strong support in the Karaveddy area. He was an acquaintance of S. Sivagnanasundaram, editor of the Sirithiran magazine and cartoonist (using the pseudonym Sundar) of the Savari Thambar cartoon strip. He was married to Australian-born Adele Ann Wilby.

== Career ==
=== Colombo ===
With Sivagnanasundaram's help, Balasingham became a sub-editor of the Colombo based Virakesari newspaper in the 1960s. He was in charge of foreign news which entailed translating Reuters and other articles into Tamil. Balasingham lived at a chummery (hostel) in Grandpass, close to the Virakesari's offices, and spent much of his free time reading. He became interested in philosophy and psychology and occasionally practised hypnotism.

Balasingham then got a job as a translator at the British High Commission in Colombo. He fell in love with Pearl Rasaratnam, a Tamil Methodist woman and daughter of a former principal of Hartley College, who was working at the British Council next to the High Commission. The couple married on 16 July 1968 at Kollupitiya Methodist Church. Pearl was a sick woman and so the couple decided to move to the UK for treatment. With the help of the British High Commission the couple left Sri Lanka on 3 August 1971.

=== London ===
Balasingham and Pearl lived in a small flat in Camberwell, London. Balasingham enrolled at the Institute of Psychotherapy and worked at the Inner London Executive Council. Pearl's condition deteriorated and was diagnosed with pyelonephritis, chronic kidney failure which required haemodialysis. Balasingham had to work, study and care for his sick wife. He was also diagnosed with diabetes. The couple later moved into a council house in the Blenheim Gardens Estate in Brixton, London. Pearl died in November 1976. Her cremated remains were taken back to Sri Lanka and interred at Kanatte Cemetery following a memorial service at Kollupitiya Methodist Church. Balasingham returned to the UK.

During his wife's illness Balasingham became acquainted with Adele Ann Wilby, an Australian nurse working in the UK. Balasingham and Wilby were married at Brixton registrar office on 1 September 1978. Balasingham obtained a M.A. degree from the South Bank Polytechnic after completing a dissertation on Marxism. He started a PhD course under John Taylor but didn't complete his studies. (Note: Another source states that Balasingham gained a PhD.)

Balasingham's interest in left-wing politics continued in London, getting involved in Marxism and the Anti-Apartheid Movement. He became involved in the Tamil militant cause which was active amongst Tamil students in London and was associated with the Eelam Revolutionary Organisation of Students. He was acquainted with leading militants such as E. Ratnasabapathy and K. Pathmanabha. He was recruited into the Liberation Tigers of Tamil Eelam (LTTE) by its London representative N. S. Krishnan. Balasingham wrote leaflets and pamphlets in English and Tamil and carried out translation for the LTTE.

=== LTTE ===
Balasingham and Wilby travelled to Tamil Nadu, India frequently where they met LTTE leaders such as V. Prabhakaran and Uma Maheswaran. When Prabhakaran and Maheswaran split, Balasingham tried to reconcile the two but after having failed, sided with Prabhakaran. Balasingham grew close to LTTE leader Prabhakaran and, following the Black July anti-Tamil riots in 1983, he and his wife moved to Madras, Tamil Nadu. Balasingham became the LTTE's theoretician and chief spokesman. Though Balasingham didn't take part in the 1985 Thimpu talks he was in constant contact with the LTTE delegation (Lawrence Thilagar and Anton Sivakumar) and gave them instructions. Following the failure of the peace talks the Indian government expelled Balasingham who returned to London. Pressure from Tamil Nadu politicians resulted in the Indian government allowing Balasingham to return to Tamil Nadu.

Sri Lankan intelligence tried to assassinate Balasingham by planting a bomb in his house. Kandasamy Naidu, a former Sri Lankan police officer and politician, was arrested in connection with the attempted assassination. Balasingham accompanied Prabhakaran to important meetings, such as that with Indian Prime Minister Rajiv Gandhi in Bangalore in 1986, to act as translator and political adviser. When Prabhakaran returned to Jaffna in 1987 Balasingham remained in Madras to oversee political work but later he and Wilby also moved to Jaffna. When war erupted between the LTTE and Indian Peace Keeping Force (IPKF) in late 1987 Balasingham and Wilby became targets for the Indian Army. The couple went on the run and managed to evade capture by moving from house to house. They eventually returned to London via India.

Balasingham returned to Sri Lanka in 1990 to lead the LTTE delegation in the peace talks in Colombo. Following the collapse of the peace talks Balasingham and Wilby moved to Jaffna which had been taken over by the LTTE following the withdrawal of the IPKF. As well as political matters Balasingham was in charge of the media in Jaffna. Balasingham wrote numerous articles including those under the pseudonym "Brahma Gnani" in the Velicham. Balasingham did not take any direct part during the 1994/95 peace talks in Chundikuli but instead monitored the talks from another room and exchanged notes with S. P. Thamilselvan who led the LTTE delegation. When the Sri Lankan military recaptured in the Jaffna Peninsula in 1995/96 the LTTE withdrew to the Vanni and Balasingham and Wilby relocated to Thiruvaiyaru near Kilinochchi. Later they moved to Puthukkudiyiruppu.

By now, Balasingham's health was deteriorating due to renal complications. The LTTE sought Sri Lankan government permission on humanitarian grounds to allow Balasingham to fly abroad via Colombo for medical treatment. The LTTE released a large number of Sri Lankan prisoners of war as a goodwill gesture. Initially President Chandrika Kumaratunga was favourable to granting permission but, after consulting with Foreign Minister Lakshman Kadirgamar, made a series of demands in return for granting permission. The Sri Lankan government was exploiting Balasingham's health to extract major military concessions from the LTTE. Balasingham asked Prabhakaran to reject the demands, saying he was "prepared to die with honour and self-respect rather than accede to these humiliating demands". The LTTE came up with another way of sending Balasingham abroad and on 23 January 1999 he was taken by sea to Phuket in Thailand. Balasingham was taken to hospital in Bangkok where it was discovered that he had an enlarged kidney which needed to be removed. Balasingham was taken to Singapore and onto London. He was allowed to go to Oslo, Norway where he received a transplanted kidney donated by Donald, a young Sri Lankan Tamil.

After recovering, Balasingham resumed his pursuit of peace. He led the LTTE's discussions with the Norwegian government which resulted in the ceasefire that came into force on 23 February 2002. Balasingham returned to Sri Lanka on 25 March 2002, arriving by seaplane at Iranaimadu Tank via Maldives. He was at Prabhakaran's side when the LTTE leader met various Sri Lankan politicians. Balasingham's health meant he couldn't stay in the Vanni long but nevertheless he led the LTTE delegation at Norwegian mediated peace talks with the Sri Lankan government in Thailand, Norway, Germany, Japan and Switzerland. The peace talks failed and as the situation in Sri Lanka deteriorated so did Balasingham's health. He was diagnosed with bile duct cancer and given 6–8 weeks to live. The cancer spread to his liver, lungs, abdomen and bones. Speaking of his illness, Balasingham told the TamilNet website "when compared to the vast ocean of the collective tragedy faced by my people, my illness is merely a pebble". Balasingham died on 14 December 2006 at his home in South London. On that day the LTTE conferred the title Thesathin Kural (Voice of the Nation) on Balasingham. Balasingham's funeral was held on 20 December 2006 at Alexandra Palace, London with a parallel service in the Vanni region.
