= K. Palakidnar =

Sri Lankan lawyer and judge

Justice K. Palakidnar

President of the Court of Appeal of Sri Lanka

Personal details
- Born: 1931 Kokuvil, Ceylon
- Died: 2 June 2001
- Education: Kokuvil Hindu College; Jaffna Hindu College; St. Joseph's College, Colombo; Ceylon University College; Ceylon Law College
- Profession: Lawyer
- Ethnicity: Sri Lankan Tamil

Justice Krishnapillai Palakidnar was a leading Sri Lankan lawyer, judge and President of the Court of Appeal of Sri Lanka.

== Early life and family ==
Palakidnar was born in 1931 at Kokuvil in northern Ceylon. He was the son of S. Krishnapillai, Chief Trains Controller, and Pasupathy. He was educated at Kokuvil Hindu College, Jaffna Hindu College and St. Joseph's College, Colombo. After school he joined the Ceylon University College, graduating with a BA degree. He then entered Ceylon Law College, qualifying as an advocate of the Supreme Court in 1957.

== Career ==
After qualifying Palakidnar practised law in Colombo as a junior under C. Renganathan. He joined the Judicial Service in 1966, serving as a magistrate in Anuradhapura, Ratnapura and Jaffna. He was then a District Judge in Kalmunai, Chavakachcheri and Jaffna. He served as a High Court Judge between 1982 and 1987, serving in Chilaw, Negombo, Batticaloa and Trincomalee. He was appointed to the Court of Appeal in 1987, becoming its president in October 1992.

== Later life ==
After retirement Palakidnar was appointed chairman of the Special Commission on Disappearance in the North and East by President Chandrika Kumaratunga. He was director of the Human Rights Task Force. Palakidnar died on 2 June 2001.
