= Balasingam =

Balasingam பாலசிங்கம்
- Pronunciation: Pālaciṅkam
- Gender: Male
- Language: Tamil

Origin
- Meaning: Young lion
- Region of origin: Southern India; North-eastern Sri Lanka

Other names
- Alternative spelling: Balasingham

Balasingam or Balasingham (Tamil: பாலசிங்கம்) is a Tamil male given name. Due to the Tamil tradition of using patronymic surnames it may also be a surname for males and females.

== Notable people ==
=== Given name ===
- Anton Balasingham (1938–2006), Sri Lankan rebel
- C. Balasingham (1917–2001), Ceylonese civil servant
- K. Balasingam (1876–1952), Ceylonese lawyer and politician

=== Surname ===
- Adele Balasingham (born 1950), British nurse
- Balasingham Nadesan (died 2009), Sri Lankan rebel
