= Jaffna College =

- யாழ்ப்பாணக் கல்லூரி

Location
- Vaddukoddai, Jaffna District; Sri Lanka; 9°43′45.20″N 79°56′54.30″E

Information
- School type: Private 1AB
- Denomination: Anglicanism
- Founded: 1871
- School district: Valikaamam Education Zone
- Authority: Board of Directors of Jaffna College
- School number: 1011032
- Principal: Rushira Kulasingham
- Gender: Co-educational

Jaffna College is a private school in Vaddukoddai, Sri Lanka. It was founded in 1871 as a successor to the Batticotta Seminary which had been established by American missionaries.

== History ==
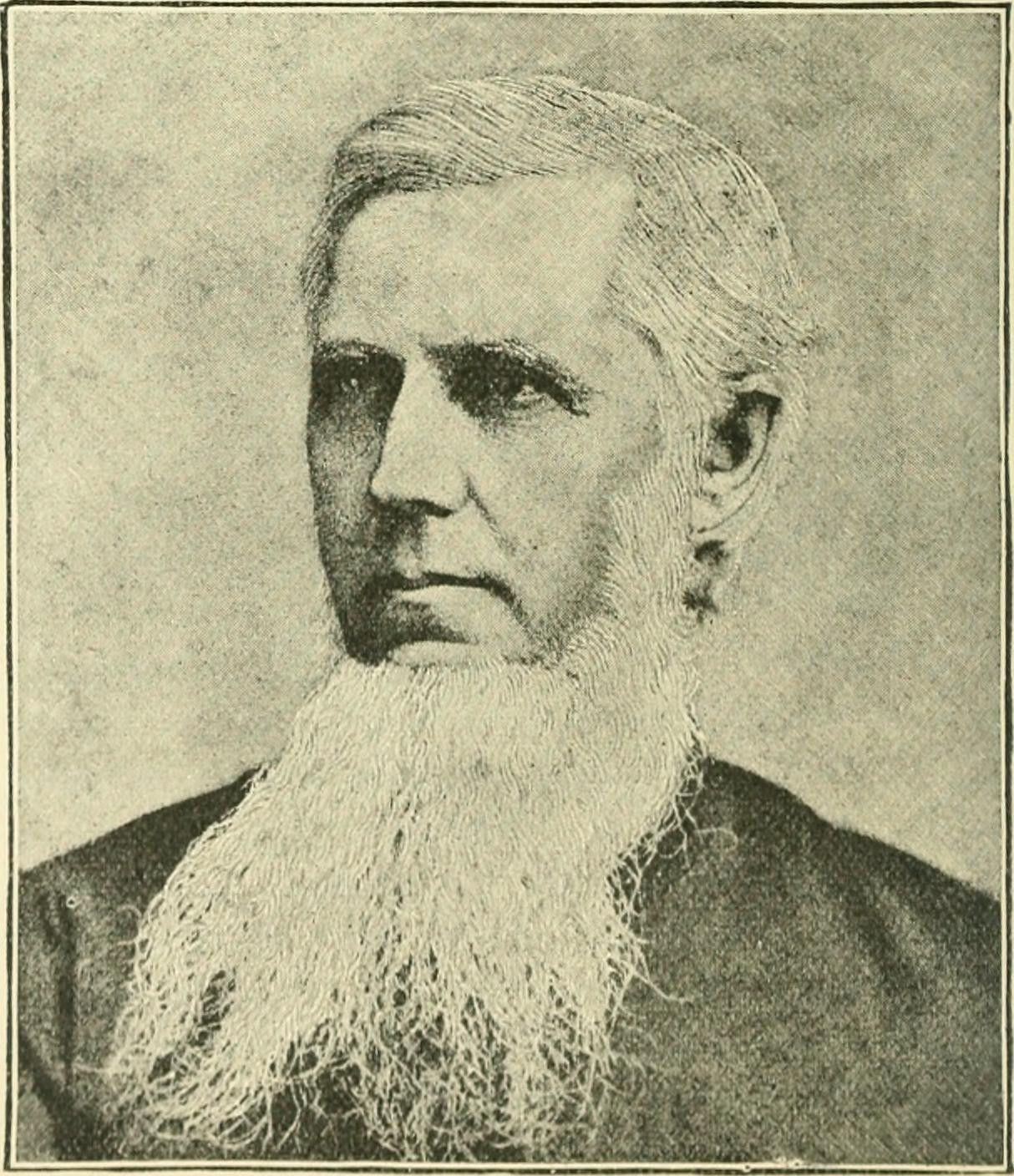
E. P. Hastings, the last principal of Batticotta Seminary and the first principal of Jaffna College

In 1816 American missionaries founded the American Ceylon Mission in Jaffna. The ACM established missions in other parts of the Jaffna Peninsula including one in Vaddukoddai. The ACM established numerous schools on the peninsula, the first school being the Common Free School (Union College) in Tellippalai. In 1823 the Batticotta Seminary was established in Vaddukoddai to educate the brightest boys on the peninsula. The seminary was intended to convert the boys to Christianity, but most boys retained their Hindu faith. As a consequence, the seminary was closed around 1855.

Alumni of the Batticotta Seminary and other local Christians led a campaign to re-open the seminary and in 1871 Jaffna College was opened on the former seminary site.

== Evelyn Rutnam Institute for Inter-Cultural Studies ==
The Evelyn Rutnam Institute for Inter-Cultural Studies is located in Jaffna and established in the memory of Evelyn Wijeyaratne Rutnam, the late wife of late Dr. James T. Rutnam. Dr. Rutnam had a huge collection of books and research articles by his contacts and collection from university dons. researchers, leading legal figures and businessmen. Learned personnel always visited him there for consultation and made use of his library. Later on Dr. Rutnam has given his collection of books to Jaffna College in Vaddukoddai and established a building in Jaffna to store books for research purposes. It was named the Evelyn Rutnam Institute and remains under the American Missionaries as a testimony to James Rutnam's love of research and learning, and encouragement to young students.

=== Cricket ===
Jaffna College play St. Patrick's College, Jaffna in an annual cricket match known as the Battle of the Golds. The first match took place in 1917.

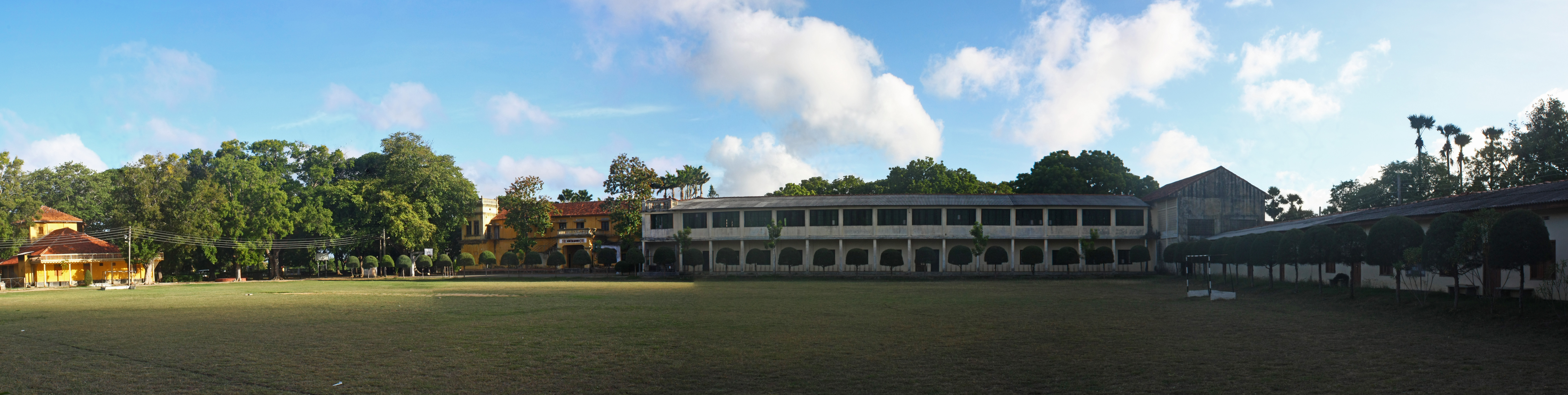
The school and grounds in 2015

== Notable alumni ==
- Allen Abraham – Academic and astronomer.
- D. J. Ambalavanar – Church of South India Bishop of Jaffna.
- S. Arasaratnam – Professor of History.
- K. Arulanandan – Professor of Engineering.
- A. Arulpiragasam – Commissioner of Elections.
- Y. Balaretnarajah – Chief of the Defence Staff of Sri Lanka.
- K. Balasingam – Member of the Legislative Council of Ceylon.
- V. Balasubramaniam – Businessman.
- J. V. Chelliah – Vice principal of Jaffna College.
- R. C. S. Cooke – Senior Assistant Commissioner for Co-operative Development.
- Valentine Daniel – Academic and anthropologist.
- Waithilingam Duraiswamy – Speaker of the State Council of Ceylon.
- A. Gnanathasan – Deputy Solicitor General of Sri Lanka, President's Counsel
- A. Gunanayagam – Senior Deputy Auditor General.
- R. J. Gunaratnam – Chairman of Ceyma Silk Industries.
- K. Indrapala – Dean of the Faculty of Humanities, Jaffna Campus of the University of Sri Lanka.
- D. B. S. Jeyaraj – Journalist.
- B. H. S. Jayewardene – Editor of the Ceylon Daily News.
- S. Jebanesan – Church of South India Bishop of Jaffna.
- Silan Kadirgamar – Academic and historian.
- S. R. Kanaganayagam – Member of the Senate.
- K. Kandiah – Lecturer at Cavendish Laboratory, instruments specialist at the Atomic Energy Research Establishment.
- M. Kulasekaram – Vice principal of Royal College, Colombo.
- A. V. Kulasingham – Editor of the Ceylon Daily News and Hindu Organ.
- S. Kulendran – Church of South India Bishop of Jaffna.
- V. C. Manicam – Auditor General.
- A. T. Moorthy – Sri Lankan High Commissioner to the United Kingdom.
- P. Nagalingam – Member of the Senate.
- S. I. Navaratnam – President of the British Medical Association (Ceylon).
- S. Pathmanathan – Chancellor of the University of Jaffna.
- Handy Perinpanayagam – Independence activist.
- S. A. Raheem – Member of Parliament for Mannar, High Commissioner.
- V. Ramaswamy – Crown proctor, Chairman of Anuradhapura Urban Council.
- E. V. Ratnam – Surgeon, Member of Colombo Municipal Council.
- J. M. Sabaratnam – Additional Government Agent.
- Joseph Sarvananthan – Church of Ceylon Archdeacon of Jaffna.
- K. Sittambalam – Director of Finance of General Treasury.
- S. Sivanayagam – Editor of Saturday Review, Tamil Nation and Hot Spring.
- P. Sriskandarajah – Judge, Supreme Court of Ceylon.
- Rajini Thiranagama – Academic and human rights activist.
- K. Thurairatnam – Member of Parliament for Point Pedro.
- A. Vaidialingam – Founding member of the United Socialist Party.
- R. T. Vignaraja – High Court Judge.

== See also ==
- List of schools in Northern Province, Sri Lanka
