= Joseph Sarvananthan =

Sri Lankan chaplain

Venerable Joseph Sarvananthan
- Anglican Archdeacon of Jaffna
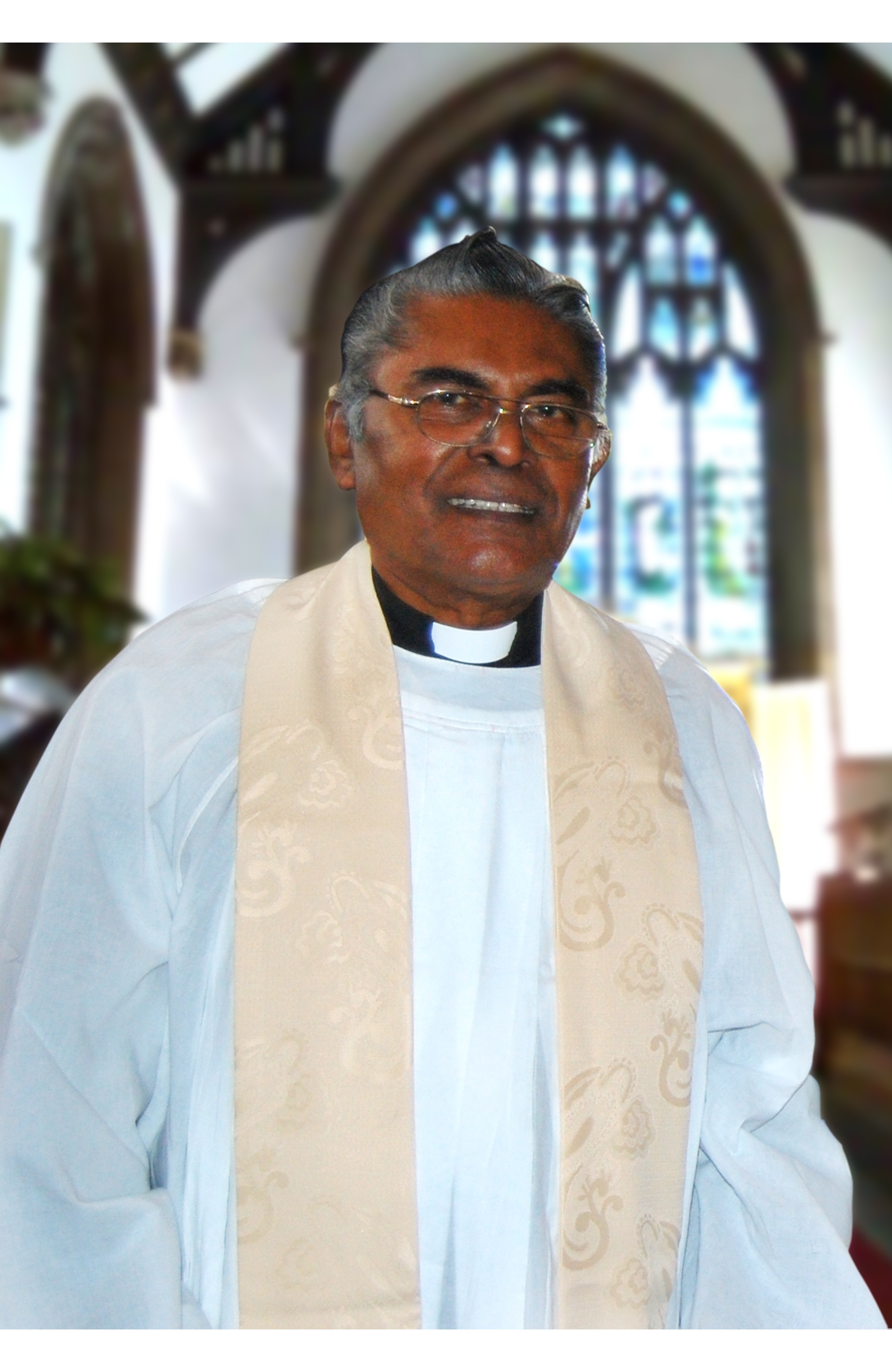
- Church: Anglican Church of Ceylon
- See: Diocese of Colombo
- In office: 1995–2001
- Predecessor: Venerable Dr Donald Kanagaratnam
- Successor: Venerable S P Nesakumar
- Previous post(s): Vicar of various parishes, Lecturer Theological College of Lanka, Pilimatalawa

Personal details
- Born: Ceylon (Sri Lanka)

Venerable Joseph Sarvananthan was an Anglican priest, in the Diocese of Colombo of the Church of Ceylon in Sri Lanka. He was made a deacon in 1965 and ordained as a priest in 1966.

== Life ==
Known as Fr Sarva or Sarvananthan 'Pothagar', he served in Bandarawela, Chilaw, Jaffna and Colombo. He has been a chaplain to St. John's College, Jaffna and C.M.S. Ladies' College, Colombo Colombo and dean of post-ordination training. He was the chairman of the board of governors for the CMS schools. He was also the archdeacon of Jaffna from 1995 to 2001. Finally he served as priest in charge of Christ Church, Galle Face, before his untimely death after a brief illness.

Father Sarvananthan faithfully served God and the Body of Christ for 44 years.

He had his primary and secondary education at Jaffna College, Vaddukottai, Jaffna, Sri Lanka. Degree at Divinity School Colombo, which is affiliated to Serampore College, India. Furthermore, he went to Château De Bossey in Geneva to do his master's degree in theology in 1986.

As a member of the Faith and Order Commission of the World Council of Churches, Ven. J Sarvananthan attended the Christian Conference of Asia, which convened in Malaysia in July and August 2004.

Fr Sarva along with his wife Iris was present at the ordination of his eldest son Sudharshan Sarvananthan at Carlisle Cathedral in June 2008. His son, who finally decided to take holy orders following in his father's footsteps, served his title post in the Heart of Eden Team Ministry in rural Cumbria, UK.

== See also ==
- Church of Ceylon

== See also ==
- His inner life and spirituality made him what he was – The Sunday Times 27 February 2011
- Christian Perspectives – Daily News 3 March 2011
- He touched and enriched our lives – The Sunday Times 6 March 2011
- A dedicated man of God – Daily Mirror 15 March 2011
