= Sam A. Sabapathy =

Ceylon Tamil lawyer & first Mayor of Jaffna (1898-1964)

Honourable Sam A. Sabapathy MMC
- சாம் அ. சபாபதி
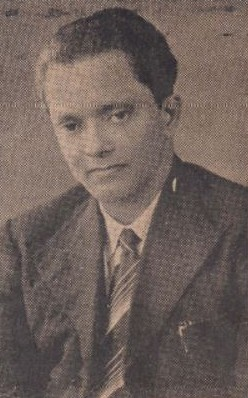

1st Mayor of Jaffna
- In office 6 January 1949 – 31 December 1949
- Succeeded by: C. Ponnambalam
- In office 11 January 1952 – 31 December 1955
- Preceded by: C. Ponnambalam
- Succeeded by: Kadhi. M. A. M. M. Sulthan

Personal details
- Born: 6 September 1898
- Died: 12 February 1964 (aged 65)
- Relations: S. Kulendran (brother)
- Education: St. John's College, Jaffna
- Profession: Lawyer
- Ethnicity: Ceylon Tamil

Samuel Ariaretnam Sabapathy (8 September 1898 – 12 February 1964 ) was a Ceylon Tamil lawyer and the first Mayor of Jaffna.

== Early life and family ==
Sabapathy was born on 8 September 1898. He was the son of Kanagasabapathipillai from Varany and Annammah. His brother S. Kulendran was Bishop of Jaffna. Sabapathy was educated at St. John's College, Jaffna where he was head prefect, captain of the cricket team and member of the football team.

Sabapathy married Kanakeswary, daughter of Nagalingam from Tholpuram. They had a daughter (Padmini).

== Career ==
Sabapathy joined the legal profession after finishing his education, becoming a proctor specialising in criminal law. He practised law in Jaffna.

Sabapathy was elected to Jaffna Urban Council, serving as its chairman between 1937 and 1939. Jaffna was given municipality status in 1949 and Sabapathy became the city's first mayor. He is credited with creation of Jaffna Public Library, Subramaniam Park and Health Centre/Maternity Clinic. Sabapathy laid the foundation stone for the library on 29 March 1953.

== Death ==
Sabapathy died on 12 February 1964.
