= Chundikuli Girls' College =

Private school in Jaffna, Northern Province, Sri Lanka

- சுண்டிக்குளி மகளிர் கல்லூரி

Location
- Main Street, Chundikuli; Jaffna, Jaffna District, Northern Province; Sri Lanka; 9°39′21.70″N 80°01′43.40″E

Information
- School type: Private 1AB
- Denomination: Anglicanism
- Founded: 1896
- Founder: Mary Carter
- School district: Jaffna Education Zone
- Authority: Church of Ceylon
- School number: 1001028
- Principal: Mrs. Dushyanthi Thuseetharan
- Teaching staff: 74
- Grades: 1–13
- Gender: Girls
- Age range: 5–18
- Colours: Red and Black

Chundikuli Girls' College (CGC) is a girls private school in Jaffna, Sri Lanka. It was founded in 1896 by British Anglican missionaries.

== History ==
Chundikuli Girls' College was founded on 14 January 1896 by Mary Carter of the Church Mission Society of the Anglican Church. The school had only 9 students but by the end of 1896 the number had grown to 30. In 1900 CGC became a grant-in-aid school. The Old Girls' Association was inaugurated in August 1915 by then principal Sophia Lucinda Page. Tamil was first taught as a subject in 1916. The following year the school was registered as a fully organised secondary school making it the first school of this type in the north of Ceylon.

CGC relocated to its current location on 6 October 1936. In 1945 CGC started providing free education. In 1947 CGC was recognised as a Grade 1 school. Most private schools in Ceylon were taken over by the government in 1960 but CGC chose to remain as a private. As any private school, attending CGC also required donations and term fees.

== Overview ==
CGC is situated on Main Street in Chundikuli, a south-eastern suburb of Jaffna. Since its founding the school has mainly catered to Sri Lankan Tamil girls. The school is divided into three: a primary school providing specialised education from grades 1 to 5; the middle school for students from grades 6 to 8; and the senior school for students from grades 9 to 12.

== Houses ==
The House system was first introduced in 1926. The houses were Tennys, Nightingale and Shakespeare. The following year they were renamed Carter, Good Child and Page after former principals hopen cartner

of CGC.[citation needed]

== Principals ==
- 2006– Mrs. D. Thuseetharan
- 1996–2005 T. Rajaratnam
- 1983– L. P. Jeyaweerasingam
- 1961–83 G. E. S. Chelliah
- 1951–61 Sarah T. Mathai
- 1943–50 E. M. Thillayampalam
- 1932– Northway
- 1931–32 Maud Willis
- 1904–31 Sophia Lucinda Page
- 1896– Mary Carter

== See also ==
- List of schools in Northern Province, Sri Lanka
- St. John's College, Jaffna
