= S. Sivanayagam =

Sri Lankan Tamil journalist (1930–2010)

- எஸ். சிவநாயகம்
- Born: Subramaniam Sivanayagam; 7 September 1930; Kokkuvil, Ceylon
- Died: 29 November 2010 (aged 80); Colombo, Sri Lanka
- Education: Kokkuvil Hindu College; Jaffna College
- Occupation: Journalist

Subramaniam Sivanayagam (Tamil: சுப்பிரமணியம் சிவநாயகம்; 7 September 1930 – 29 November 2010) was a Sri Lankan journalist, author and editor of the Saturday Review, Tamil Nation and Hot Spring.

== Early life and family ==
Sivanayagam was born on 7 September 1930 in Kokkuvil in northern Ceylon. He was the son of Sattanathar Subramaniam from Vannarpannai and Kanmaniammal from Kokkuvil. He was educated at Kokkuvil Hindu College and Jaffna College. He then joined Ceylon Law College but left after two years without completing the course.

Sivanayagam married Subadradevi, daughter of A. Navaratnarajah. They had two daughters (Sivanangai and Sivanarayani).

== Career ==
Sivanayagam joined the editorial staff of the Ceylon Daily News in 1953. He later wrote a column in The Times of Ceylon. He then worked for the Daily Mirror (1961–69), J. Walter Thompsons (1970–71) and Ceylon Tourist Board.

Sivanayagam became the first editor of the Saturday Review in January 1982. After the Black July riots of 1983 the Sri Lankan government banned the Saturday Review and Sivanayagam, fearing arrest, fled to Madras where he was in charge of the Tamil Information Centre and Tamil Information and Research Institute. He contributed articles to several journals. He became editor of the newly created Tamil Nation journal in October 1990. After the assassination Rajiv Gandhi in May 1991 Sivanayagam was arrested under the National Security Act and imprisoned without charge. He was abused and tortured by the Indian police. After being released Sivanayagam sought asylum in France in 1993.

== Later life ==
Whilst in France Sivanayagam founded and edited the Hot Spring journal. He later moved to London. Two books written by him were published: The Pen and the Gun (2001) and Sri Lanka — Witness to History — A Journalist’s Memoirs (2005). He returned to Colombo after contracting bone cancer. Sivanayagam died on 29 November 2010 in Colombo.
