= R. R. Selvadurai =

Sri Lankan lawyer and civil servant (1894–1973)

- Born: 19 November 1894
- Died: 1973 (aged 78–79)
- Occupation: Civil servant
- Title: Permanent Secretary, Ministry of Justice
- Term: 1951–55

Robert Rajanayagam Selvadurai (19 November 1894 – 1973) was a leading Ceylon Tamil lawyer and civil servant.

== Early life ==
Selvadurai was born on 19 November 1894. He was son of Godwin William and Gnanamma Selvadurai form Chundikuli in northern Ceylon. He was educated at St. John's College, Jaffna and S. Thomas' College, Mount Lavinia.

Selvadurai married Lilly Suhitharetnam Saravanamuutu. They had three sons (G. E. Selvadurai K. C. Selvadurai, Dr IL Selvadurai and two daughters (Gnanamma, Parimalam).

== Career ==
After school Selvadurai taught briefly at S. Thomas' College before becoming an advocate and practising law in Colombo. After three years he joined the judiciary, serving as a police magistrate in Kalutara and district judge in Tangalle, Badulla, Kegalle, Kandy and Jaffna. Selvadurai was appointed Permanent Secretary at the Ministry of Justice in 1951. He retired in 1955.

In 1946 Selvadurai was elected president of the Old Boys' Association of St. John's College, Jaffna.

Selvadurai and his family were victims of 1958 anti-Tamil riots. On 27 May 1958 as Sinhalese mobs attacked Tamil targets, Selvadurai and his family, like hundreds of Tamils, were forced to flee from their home on Templar's Road, Mount Lavinia and seek refuge in a police station. The family home was burnt down by the mob that night. The following morning Selvadurai and one of his sons went back to their home to retrieve the few personal belongings which survived the fire but they were spotted by a group of eight people who proceeded to destroy the personal belongings as well.

Selvadurai died in 1973.
