= Satchi Ponnambalam =

Sri Lankan lawyer and judge (1935–1999)

Justice Satchi Ponnambalam

Puisne Justice of the Supreme Court of Belize
- In office 1985–1993

Personal details
- Born: 27 January 1935
- Died: 31 January 1999 (aged 64) Belize City
- Education: University of Ceylon, Peradeniya
- Profession: Lawyer
- Ethnicity: Sri Lankan Tamil

Justice Satchi Ponnambalam (27 January 1935 – 31 January 1999) was a leading Sri Lankan Tamil lawyer and judge.

== Early life and family ==
Ponnambalam was born on 27 January 1935. He was the son of R. Ponnambalam and Sinnamah Ammal from Chundikuli in northern Ceylon. He was educated at St. John's College, Jaffna. After school he entered University of Ceylon, Peradeniya in 1955.

Ponnambalam married Vasantha (Vasi), daughter of V. Sittampalam. They had three daughters (Sumanthi, Jamuna and Menaka).

== Career ==
Ponnambalam joined the legal profession after graduation, becoming an advocate and solicitor (England). He was then state advocate and senior state advocate in Zambia. He then moved to Belize in 1981 to serve as a magistrate. He was promoted to chief magistrate before joining the Supreme Court of Belize as a puisne judge in 1985. He retired in 1993.

Ponnambalam worked as a legal consultant, participated at Tamil conferences and wrote two books: Dependent Capitalism in Crisis in Sri Lanka, 1948-79 (1980) and Sri Lanka : The National Question and the Tamil Liberation Struggle (1983). He died on 31 January 1999 at his home in Belize City.
