= J. T. Arulanantham =

Ceylonese priest (1897–1964)

Rev. J. T. Arulanantham
- Born: 13 May 1897
- Died: 21 June 1964 (aged 67)
- Education: St. John's College, Jaffna; University College, Colombo; Ridley Hall, Cambridge; King's College London
- Occupation: Teacher

The Reverend John Thiagarajah Arulanantham (13 May 1897 – 21 June 1964) was a Ceylonese priest and teacher. He was the principal of St. John's College, Jaffna from 1940 to 1957.

== Early life ==
Arulanantham was born on 13 May 1897. He was son of two teachers from Nayanmarkaddu near Nallur in northern Ceylon. He was educated at St. John's College, Jaffna. He then went to University College, Colombo from where he passed the University of London Inter Science Examination.

Arulanantham was selected by the Church Missionary Society and sent to Ridley Hall, Cambridge to study theology. He was ordained at St Paul's Cathedral in 1933. He then went to King's College London from where he graduated with an honours degree in psychology.

Arulanantham married Pushpam Asirvatham. They had three sons (Dr Pararasan, Vijayan and Dr Karunyan) and one daughter (Kirupa).

== Career ==
After graduation Arulanantham returned to Ceylon and took up a position as principal of a school in Peradeniya. In 1936 he was appointed vice principal of St. John's College, Jaffna. He was appointed principal in 1940, a position he held until his retirement in 1957. Arulanantham was the first native Ceylonese to be appointed principal of St. John's College.

== Retirement ==
After retirement Arulanantham joined the church, serving as vicar of the Christ Church, Galle Face, Colombo. Later he served as priest-in-charge of the St. John's Church, Chundikuli, Jaffna. Arulanantham died on 21 June 1964 aged 67.
