= Silan Kadirgamar =

Sri Lankan Tamil academic, historian and author (1934–2015)

- சீலன் கதிர்காமர்
- Born: 11 April 1934; Chavakachcheri, Ceylon
- Died: 25 July 2015 (aged 81)
- Education: University of Ceylon, Peradeniya; International Christian University
- Occupation: Academic

Santasilan Kadirgamar (Tamil: சாந்தசீலன் கதிர்காமர்; 11 April 1934 – 25 July 2015; known as Silan Kadirgamar) was a Sri Lankan Tamil academic, historian and author.

== Early life and family ==
Kadirgamar was born on 11 April 1934 in Chavakachcheri in northern Ceylon. He was the son of Rev. J. W. A. Kadirgamar and Grace Nesammmah Hitchcock. He spent his early childhood in Malaya, receiving primary education in Seremban between 1941 and 1945. Returning to Ceylon, he was educated Jaffna College. After school he joined the University of Ceylon, Peradeniya to study history, graduating in 1959 with a BA (General) degree. He got involved in left wing politics whilst a student at Peradeniya and was a sympathiser of the Lanka Sama Samaja Party.

Kadirgamar married Sakuntala. They had two sons (Ajayan and Ahilan). He was a first cousin of Lakshman Kadirgamar.

== Career ==
Kadirgamar taught history, politics and international relations in the undergraduate department of Jaffna College between 1959 and 1969. He then taught in the Department of History at the University of Ceylon, Colombo between 1970 and 1978. In 1974 he joined the International Christian University in Japan to study for a master's degree. In 1979 he became a senior lecturer of history at the University of Jaffna, serving as head of the Department of History from 1982. As the security situation deteriorated in northern Sri Lanka, human rights abuses became widespread. Kadirgamar was one of the founders of the Jaffna branch of the Movement for Inter-Racial Justice and Equality (MIRJE) in 1979. Following the burning of Jaffna library in 1981 he helped found the Jaffna Citizens’ Committee. He was also one of the founders of the Saturday Review.

Kadirgamar returned to Japan in 1983 on a Japan Foundation Fellowship and lectured at several universities in the Tokyo-Yokohama area: Tokyo University of Foreign Studies, Tokyo Woman's Christian University, International Christian University, Meiji Gakuin University, Sophia University Community College, Keisen University, Aoyama Gakuin Women's Junior College, Wako University and International School of the Sacred Heart. He returned to Sri Lanka in 2000 and settled in Dehiwela.

Kadirgamar contested the 2004 parliamentary election as one of the candidates for the New Left Front (NLF) in Colombo District but the NLF failed to win any seats in Parliament. He contested the 2011 local government election as one of the candidates for the Democratic People's Front (DPF) in Dehiwala-Mount Lavinia Municipal Council but failed to get elected after coming fifth amongst the DPF candidates. He died on 25 July 2015 after a brief illness.

== Works ==
Kadirgamar wrote several books on Sri Lankan Tamil history and politics.

- The Jaffna Youth Congress (1980)
- Handy Perinbanayagam: A Memorial Volume (1980, Handy Perinbanayagam Commemoration Society)
- Ethnicity: Identity, Conflict and Crisis, (1989, Arena Press, co-editor Kumar David)
- The Left Tradition in Lankan Tamil Politics (2001, in Hector Abhayavardhana Felicitation Volume)
- Jaffna Youth Radicalism – The 1920s and 1930s (2009, in Pathways of Dissent: Tamil Nationalism in Sri Lanka)
- The Tamils of Lanka: Their Struggle for Justice and Equality with Dignity (2010)
- Handy Perinbanayagam: A Memorial Volume (2012, Kumaran Book House)
- The Jaffna Youth Congress (2013, Kumaran Book House)
- Landmarks in the History of the Left: 1935-1980 (2014, in Pathways of the Left in Sri Lanka)
