= St. Thomas' Cathedral, Vaddukoddai =

St. Thomas' Cathedral
- Cathedral Church at Vaddukoddai
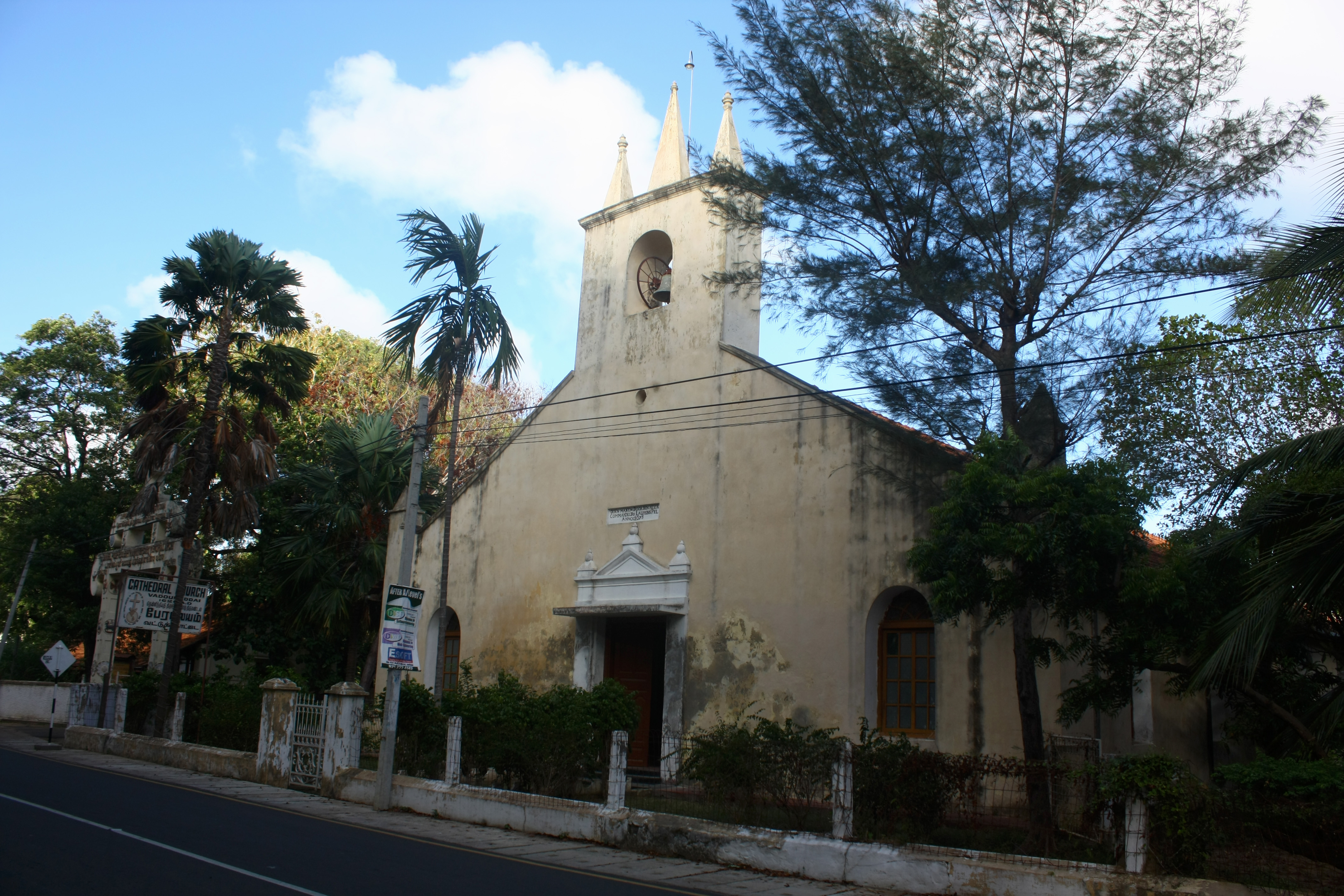

- Location within Northern Province
- 09°43′45.70″N 79°56′56.60″E
- Location: Vaddukoddai
- Country: Sri Lanka
- Denomination: United

History
- Status: Cathedral

Architecture
- Functional status: Active
- Heritage designation: Archaeological protected monument
- Designated: 30 December 2011

Administration
- Diocese: Jaffna

Clergy
- Bishop: Daniel Thiagarajah

St. Thomas' Cathedral is the seat of the Jaffna Diocese of the Church of South India located in Vaddukoddai, Sri Lanka.

== History ==
Portuguese Jesuits built a Catholic church in Vaddukoddai in the 1660s which was later taken over and renovated by the Dutch before being handed over to the American Ceylon Mission (ACM) by the British. In May 1904 the Congregational Council of Ceylon (CCC) was set-up to administer ACM's churches. CCC joined with the American Madura Mission and the London Missionary Society in Travancore to form the United Churches of South India and Ceylon (UCSIC) in 1905. UCSIC joined with the South India Synod of the Presbyterian Church to form the South India United Church (SIUC) in 1908/09. The Church of South India was established in September 1947 as a union of the SIUC, South India Provincial Synod of Methodist Church and the southern dioceses of the Church of India, Pakistan, Burma and Ceylon.

The cathedral was declared an archaeological protected monument in December 2011.
