= Selvadurai =

Selvadurai (Tamil: செல்வதுரை) is a masculine given name or a surname. The name "Selvadurai" means "prosperous leader". It is the combination of selvam செல்வம் (meaning wealth, prosperity or wealth) and durai துரை (meaning lord, leader or lord).

Notable people with the include:

- Naveen Selvadurai (born 1982), American internet entrepreneur
- Nevins Selvadurai (1863–1938), Ceylon Tamil teacher, member of the State Council of Ceylon
- P. Selvadurai (1933–2024), Singaporean politician and lawyer
- R. R. Selvadurai (1894–1973), Ceylon Tamil lawyer and civil servant
- Shyam Selvadurai (born 1965), Sri Lankan-Canadian novelist

== See also ==
- Kisona Selvaduray (born 1998), Malaysian badminton player
- Chelladurai, several people
