= C. E. Anandarajah =

Sri Lankan educationist (born 1932)

- Born: 31 January 1931
- Died: 26 June 1985 (aged 54)
- Education: Kopay Christian College; St. John's College, Jaffna; Madras Christian College
- Occupation: Teacher
- Spouse: Late Padma
- Children: 5 children

Chelliah Edwin Anandarajah (Anandarajan) was a Sri Lankan educationist. He was a teacher and principal of St. John's College, Jaffna. He was assassinated by the Liberation Tigers of Tamil Eelam during the Sri Lankan Civil War.

== Early life ==
Anandarajah was born on 31 January 1932. He was the eldest son of G. S. Chelliah, principal of Kopay Christian College in Kopay in northern province of Ceylon. He was educated at Kopay Christian College and St. John's College, Jaffna where he was the senior prefect in 1951. He then went to Madras Christian College from where he graduated with a degree in zoology.

Anandarajah married Padma, daughter of Kadirgamar. They had five children.

== Career ==
After graduation Anandarajah returned to Ceylon and took up a position as assistant teacher at St. John's College in May 1955. In June 1970 he was appointed co-vice principal and in 1975 he became vice principal. He was appointed principal in March 1976, a position he held until his assassination in June 1985.

== Assassination ==
Anandarajah was assassinated on 26 June 1985 in Jaffna as he was riding his motorbike. It is alleged that the Liberation Tigers of Tamil Eelam assassinated Anandarajah for organising a cricket match with the Sri Lankan military.
