= St. John's College, Jaffna =

St. John's College
- சென்.ஜோண்ஸ் கல்லூரி ශාන්ත ජෝන් විද්‍යාලය

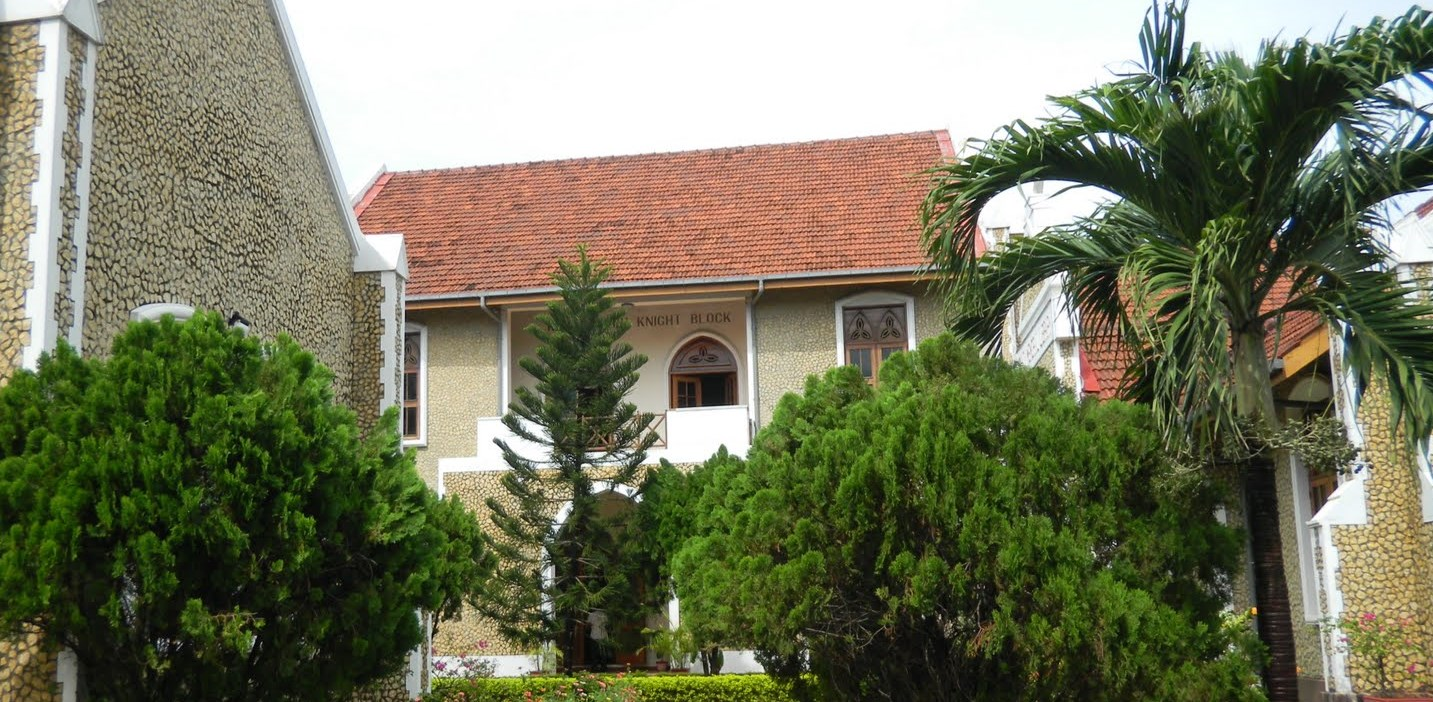
- Knight block

Location
- Main Street, Chundikuli; Jaffna, Jaffna District, Northern Province 40000; Sri Lanka; 9°39′27.90″N 80°01′36.90″E

Information
- School type: Private 1AB
- Motto: Latin: Lux in Tenebris Lucet (Light Shines in the Darkness)
- Denomination: Anglicanism
- Patron saint: St. John
- Founded: 1823; 203 years ago
- Founder: Joseph Knight
- Sister school: Chundikuli Girls' College, Jaffna
- School district: Jaffna Education Zone
- Authority: Church of Ceylon
- School number: 1001029
- Principal: V. S. B. Thuseetharan
- Headmistress: E. I. Thevamithiran (junior school)
- Headmaster: A. H. Gnanarajan (vice principal)
- Head teacher: V. Kumanan (vice principal)
- Chaplain: S. S. Jebaselvan
- Teaching staff: 95
- Grades: 1 - 13
- Gender: Boys
- Age range: 5 - 18
- Houses: Handy; Johnstone; Pargiter; Peto; Thompson
- Colors: Red and Black
- Alumni name: Old Johnians
- Website: stjohns.edu.lk

St. John's College (Tamil: பரி. யோவான் கல்லூரி, romanized: Ceṉ. Yōvāṉ Kallūri; Sinhala: ශාන්ත ජෝන් විද්‍යාලය; SJC) is a private school in Jaffna, Sri Lanka. Founded in 1823 by British Anglican missionaries, it is one of Sri Lanka's oldest schools.

== History ==
In 1817 the Anglican Church Mission Society (CMS) approved the establishment of missions in Ceylon. On 20 December 1817 four clergymen – Joseph Knight, Samuel Lambrick, Robert Major and Benjamin Ward – and their wives left England and sailed to Ceylon on board the Vittoria. They arrived in late June 1818. Knight went to Jaffna, Lambrick went to Colombo, Major and his wife went to Galle and Ward and his wife to Trincomalee. Knight started his missionary work in 1818 in Nallur.

The Nallur English Seminary was established in March 1823 by Knight. The school had only 7 students and was located in Knight's bungalow. In 1845 the school was relocated to Chundikuli and renamed the Chundikuli Seminary.

In the same year the Church Mission Society took over the old Portuguese St. John the Baptist church. In 1846 the school moved into a hall next to the church. The church was demolished in 1859 and replaced by the current church.

The school was renamed St. John's College in 1891. The free education system was introduced by the government in 1945 but SJC chose to remain outside the system. In 1951 SJC joined the free education system. Most private schools in Ceylon were taken over by the government in 1960 but SJC chose to remain as a private and non-fee levying school.

SJC's principal C. E. Anandarajah was shot dead on 26 June 1985 in Jaffna. It is alleged that the Liberation Tigers of Tamil Eelam assassinated Anandarajan for organising a cricket match with the Sri Lankan military.

== Big Match ==
SJC plays Jaffna Central College in the annual cricket match known as the "Battle of the North". The first match took place in 1904. This is the longest running cricket encounter in the Jaffna peninsula and the 3rd oldest cricket encounter in Sri lanka

== Principals ==
- 1823-1825 Rev. Joseph Knight
- 1825-1839 Rev. W. Adley
- 1839-1841 Rev. F. W. Taylor
- 1841-1846 Rev. I. T. Johnstone
- 1846-1866 Rev. R. Pargiter
- 1866-1874 Rev. T. Good
- 1874-1878 Rev. D. Wood
- 1878-1879 Rev. E. Blackmore
- 1879-1889 Rev. G. T. Fleming
- 1889-1892 Rev. C. C. Handy (Acting)
- 1892-1895 Rev. J. W. Fall
- 1895-1899 Rev. I. Carter
- 1899-1900 Rev. R. W. Ryde
- 1900-1919 Rev. Jacob Thompson
- 1919 Rev. K. C. Mc Pherson (Acting)
- 1920-1940 Rev. Henry Peto
- 1940-1957 Rev. J. T. Arulanantham
- 1957-1959 P. T. Mathai
- 1959-1966 A. W. Rajasekeram
- 1967-1976 K. Pooranampillai
- 1976-1985 C. E. Anandarajan
- 1985-1987 T. Gunaseelan
- 1987 K. Pooranampillai
- 1988-1993 Dr. E. S. Thevasagayam
- 1990-1993 S. Thanapalan (Acting)
- 1993-2006 S. Thanapalan
- 2006-2019 Rev. N. J. Gnanaponrajah
- 2019 Ven. Samuel J. Ponniah (Acting)
- 2020- V. S. B. Thuseetharan

== Notable alumni ==
Name	Notability	Reference
D. J. Ambalavanar	Bishop of Jaffna (Church of South India) (1971–1993)	
C. E. Anandarajah	Principal St. John's College, Jaffna (1976–1985)	
J. T. Arulanantham	Principal St. John's College, Jaffna (1940–1957)	
K. D. Arulpragasam	Vice-chancellor Eastern University (1986–1996)	
S. Arumugam	Director of Irrigation, author	
Y. Balaretnarajah	Major general Chief of the Defence Staff (1992)	
Nishan Canagarajah	President and Vice-chancellor University of Leicester (2019–present) Pro-vice-chancellor University of Bristol (2014 - 2019)	
S. J. V. Chelvanayakam	leader Illankai Tamil Arasu Kachchi/Tamil United Liberation Front, member parliament – Kankesanthurai (1947–1952, 1956–1977)	
R. R. Crossette-Thambiah	Solicitor General (1950–1951)	
Alfred Duraiappah	member parliament – Jaffna (1960–1965), Mayor of Jaffna (1970–1975)	
M. K. Eelaventhan	member parliament – National List (2004–2007)	
Rajan Hoole	academic, human rights activist	
Ratnajeevan Hoole	academic, professor electrical engineering	
Clarence Jey	musician, songwriter, record producer	
Visakan Kadirkamanathan	academic, professor signal & information processing	
S. Kulendran	Bishop of Jaffna (Church of South India) (1947–1970)	
K. C. Logeswaran	Governor of Western Province (2015–present)	
T. Maheswaran	member parliament – Colombo (2004–2008)	
C. Nagalingam	acting Governor-General (1954), acting Chief Justice (1954), Attorney General (1946–1947)	
Satchi Ponnambalam	Puisne Judge – Supreme Court of Belize (1985–1993), Chief Magistrate of Belize, Senior State Advocate of Zambia	
V. Ponnampalam	Gate Mudaliyar, President of the Jaffna Co-operative Bank	
Nadarajah Raviraj	member parliament – Jaffna (2001–2006), Mayor of Jaffna (2001)	
Sam A. Sabapathy	Mayor of Jaffna (1949, 1952–1955)	
R. R. Selvadurai	Permanent Secretary Ministry of Justice (1951–1955)	
Maithripala Senanayake	member parliament – Medawachchiya (1947–1989), Governor of North Central Province (1994–1998)	
R. Sivagurunathan	journalist, editor – Thinakaran (1961–1994)	
C. Suntharalingam	member parliament – Vavuniya (1947–1960)	
Henry Thambiah	Supreme Court Judge (1960–1972)	
C. J. T. Thamotheram	educationist	
S. Vithiananthan	vice-chancellor University of Jaffna (1979–1988)	
Dingiri Bandara Welagedara	member parliament – Kurunegala, Governor of North Central Province (1988–1989)	
V. Yogeswaran	member parliament – Jaffna (1977–1983)	

== See also ==
- List of schools in Northern Province, Sri Lanka
