= Appadurai Muttulingam =

Sri Lankan author and essayist

A.Muttulingam
- Born: 19 January 1937 (age 89); Kokkuvil, Jaffna district, Northern Province, British Ceylon (now Sri Lanka)
- Spouse: Kamalaranjini
- Children: Sanjayan, Vaithehi
- Website: www.amuttu.net

Appadurai Muttulingam (Tamil அ. முத்துலிங்கம்) (born 19 January 1937) is a Sri Lankan Tamil author and essayist. His short stories in Tamil have received critical acclaim and won awards in both India and Sri Lanka.

== Biography ==
Muttulingam was born in the village of Kokkuvil in Jaffna, Sri Lanka to Appadurai and Rasamma. He was the fifth child in a family of seven. He obtained an undergraduate degree in the sciences from the University of Ceylon, Colombo in 1959. He began writing short stories in the 1960s, with his short story Akka winning a competition conducted by a Sri Lankan Tamil newspaper in 1961. This story was the title story in his first collection of short stories, Akka ("Sister"), published in 1964.

After this early success, Muttulingam did not publish any stories for the next twenty years. He qualified as a chartered accountant in 1965. He left Sri Lanka in 1972, and spent the next eighteen years working in various countries in Africa and Asia, including assignments with the World Bank and the United Nations. He has since published another collection of short stories, a collection of essays, and has edited a volume of Tamil translations of contemporary North American writing.

Muttulingam currently lives in Toronto, Ontario, Canada, with his wife Kamalaranjini.

== Works ==
- Akka ("Elder sister") (1964) - short stories.
- Thikatasakkaram ("Ten beautiful arms") (1995) – short stories
- Vamsaviruththi ("Family traits") (1996) – short stories
- Vadakku veethi ("The north road") (1998) – short stories
- Maharajavin rail vandi ("The king's train") (2001) – short stories
- A.Muttulingam kathaikal ("Stories of A. Muttulingam") (2004) - collected stories
- Ange ippa enna neram ("What time is it there?") (2005) – essays
- Inauspicious times (translated from Tamil into English by Padma Narayanan) (2008) - short stories
- Viyathalum Ilame(2006) - Interviews
- Kadikaram Amaithiyaaka Ennikkondirukkirathu (2006) - a collection of essays
- Poomiyin Paathivayathu("worlds half age") (2007) - essays
- Unmaikalantha Naatkurippukal (2008) - Novel
- A.Muttulingam kathaikal (2008) - audiobook
- Amerikkakari (2009) - short stories
- Amerikka Ulavaali (2010) - essays
- Onrukkum Uthavathavan(2011) - essays
- Kuthiraikkaaran(2012) - short stories
- Kolunthodu Pidipaen(2013)- short stories
