= S. Kulendran =

Sri Lankan bishop (1900-1992)

Rt Rev. S. Kulendran
- Bishop of Jaffna
- Church: Church of South India
- Diocese: Jaffna
- Installed: 1947
- Term ended: 1970
- Successor: D. J. Ambalavanar
- Born: 23 September 1900
- Died: 14 February 1992 (aged 91)
- Education: St. John's College, Jaffna; Jaffna College; Serampore College
- Relatives: Sam A. Sabapathy (brother)

The Right Reverend Sabapathy Kulendran (23 September 1900 – 14 February 1992) was a Ceylon Tamil priest and the Church of South India Bishop of Jaffna.

== Early life ==
Kulendran was born on 23 September 1900. He was the son of Sabapathy, a notary public. His brother Sam A. Sabapathy was Mayor of Jaffna. He was educated at St. John's College, Jaffna and Jaffna College. Later he received an Arts degree from the University of London. He then went to Serampore College in India and was ordained in 1934.

Kulendran was a member of the Jaffna Youth Congress.

Kulendran married Mathuram, daughter of Visuvalingam. They had two sons (Thavanithy and Arumaikajothi) and a daughter (Karuna).

== Career ==
Kulendran worked for the South India United Church. He became the first Church of South India Bishop of Jaffna in 1947. He retired in 1970.

== Later life ==
Kulendran lived in Vaddukoddai after retirement. He died on 14 February 1992.
