= S. Nadesan =

Sri Lankan Tamil lawyer and civil rights activist

Senator S. Nadesan QC

Member of the Senate of Ceylon
- In office 1947–1971

Personal details
- Born: 11 February 1904 Anaikoddai, Ceylon
- Died: 21 December 1986 (aged 82)
- Party: Independent
- Education: Ceylon University College
- Profession: Lawyer
- Ethnicity: Sri Lankan Tamil

Somasundaram Nadesan, QC (Tamil: சோமசுந்தரம் நடேசன்; 11 February 1904 – 21 December 1986) was a leading Sri Lankan Tamil lawyer, civil rights activist and member of the Senate of Ceylon.

== Early life and family ==
Nadesan was born on 11 February 1904 in Anaikoddai in northern Ceylon. His father was a school administrator and Nadesan was educated at Jaffna Hindu College before entering Royal College, Colombo on a Governor's scholarship. After school he joined Ceylon University College before proceeding to Ceylon Law College, qualifying as an advocate of the Supreme Court in 1932.

== Career ==
Nadesan started practising law in the 1930s. His practice became very successful and Nadesan appeared in some of the most famous legal cases in Ceylonese history: Abdul Aziz sedition (1943); Abdul Aziz criminal trespass (1959); Press Council Bill (1972); Pavidi Handa (Voice of Clergy) fundamental review (1982); Saturday Review/Aththa ban fundamental review (1983); Paul Nallanayagam treason case (1986). He served on the bar for 55 years and was made a Queen's Counsel in 1954. He was president of the Bar Council from 1970 to 1972.

Following the problems caused by the Sinhala Only Act Nadesan wrote a series of articles Sunday Observer in which he argued that conflict between the Sinhalese and Tamil nations could only be resolved by democratic principles such as bilingualism, federalism, regional autonomy and constitutional safeguards for minorities. He dismissed the suggestion that federalism could lead separation, saying that separatist movements only took root in unitary states.

Nadesan was elected to the Senate of Ceylon in 1947 after being nominated by independent members of the House of Representatives. He was appointed to National Flag Committee in 1949 and was the sole member of the committee who opposed the new flag design which he said would be "a symbol of disunity", having the two stripes, representing the country's minorities, outside the lion flag. In the senate he took part in debates on social and labour legislation, the national question, minority rights and citizenship of plantation workers. His most famous speech in the senate was that in April 1971 following the start of the Janatha Vimukthi Peramuna insurrection. When the constituent assembly was established in 1971 Nadesan was highly critical of the draft new constitution, particularly its inadequate protection of minority rights. Except for a two-year period, he remained a member of the senate until it was abolished in 1971.

Despite his passionate defence of minority rights Nadesan remained aloof of Tamil nationalistic politics and was critical of the Vaddukoddai Resolution. The political violence of the 1970s/1980s forced Nadesan to move away from politics and towards human rights protection. He was a founding member of the Civil Rights Movement in 1971 and received the Peter Pillai Foundation award in 1983 for his promotion of social justice and the protection under privileged in society. In 1980 Nadesan was tried, and acquitted, for breach of parliamentary privileges. He died on 21 December 1986 aged 82.
