= Valentine Daniel =

Sri Lankan academic, anthropologist and author

- Education: Amherst College; University of Chicago
- Occupation: Academic

Professor Errol Valentine Daniel is a Sri Lankan academic, anthropologist and author. He is currently Professor of Anthropology and Director of the Southern Asian Institute at Columbia University.

== Early life ==
Daniel is of Tamil descent on his father's side and of Burgher descent on his mother side. He was educated at Jaffna College. After school he joined Amherst College from where he received a B.A. degree. He then received M.A. and Ph.D. degrees from the University of Chicago.

== Career ==
Daniel taught at the University of Washington (1978–90). He then taught at the University of Michigan (1990–97), serving as Director of the Program in Comparative Studies in Social Transformation from 1995 to 1997. He then joined Columbia University. Daniel has also been a visiting professor at the University of Amsterdam, University of Texas at Austin, Centre d’étude de l’Inde et de l’Asie Sud and United Nations University.

Daniel was one of the recipients of the 1995 Guggenheim Fellowship. He is proficient in Tamil, Sinhala, French and Malayalam.

== Works ==
Valentine has written several books:

- Karma: An Anthropological Inquiry (1983, University of California Press. co-editor Charles F. Keyes)
- Fluid Signs: Being a Person the Tamil Way (1984, University of California Press)
- The Semeiosis of Suicide in Sri Lanka (1989, in Semiotics, Self, and Society by Benjamin Lee and Greg Urban, Mouton de Gruyter)
- Plantations, Proletarians, and Peasants in Colonial Asia (1992, Frank Cass & Co, co-editors Henry Bernstein and Tom Brass)
- Culture/Contexture: Essays in Anthropology and Literary Study (1996, University of California Press, co-editor Jeffrey M. Peck)
- Mistrusting Refugees (1996, University of California Press, co-editor John Knudsen)
- Charred Lullabies: Chapters in an Anthropography of Violence (1997, Princeton University Press)
- Suffering Nation and Alienation (1997, in Social Suffering by Kleinman, Das and Lock, University of California Press)
- The Limits of Culture (1998, in In Near Ruins: Cultural Theory at the End of the Century by Nicholas B. Dirks, University of Minnesota Press)
- The Refugee: A Discourse on Displacement (2002, in Exotic No More: Anthropology on the Front Lines by Jeremy MacClancy, University of Chicago Press)
