= S. Jebanesan =

Sri Lankan Tamil priest

Rt Rev. S. Jebanesan
- Bishop of Jaffna
- Church: Church of South India
- Diocese: Jaffna
- Installed: 1993
- Term ended: 2005
- Predecessor: D. J. Ambalavanar
- Successor: Daniel Thiagarajah

Personal details
- Born: 28 March 1940 (age 86)
- Education: Drieberg College; Jaffna College; University of Ceylon; University of Jaffna

The Right Reverend Subramaniam Jebanesan (born 28 March 1940) is a Sri Lankan Tamil priest and former Church of South India Bishop of Jaffna.

== Early life ==
Jebanesan was born on 28 March 1940. He was the son of teachers N. Subramaniam and Kanagammah from Chavakachcheri in northern Ceylon. He was educated at Drieberg College and Jaffna College. After school he joined the University of Ceylon, Peradeniya from where he graduated in 1962 with BA degree. Later he obtained three MA degrees in Tamil, English and philosophy. He then received a Phd from the University of Jaffna.

Jebanesan married Vimala, daughter of Rajakulendran, Member of Parliament for Nawalapitiya. They have two daughters (Nirmalene and Geethanjely).

== Career ==
Jebanesan started teaching at St. Anthony's College, Kandy in 1962. In 1969 he joined Jaffna College as a teacher of history and civics. He served as vice-principal of Jaffna College before becoming principal in 1988.

Jebanesan became the third Church of South India Bishop of Jaffna in 1993. He retired on 28 March 2005.

Jebanesan has been a member of the University of Jaffna's council since 1992.
