= R. Sivagurunathan =

Kalasuri R. Sivagurunathan
- Born: 7 October 1931; Kantharamadam, Ceylon
- Died: 9 August 2003 (aged 71); Colombo, Sri Lanka
- Education: St. John's College, Jaffna; Jaffna Hindu College; Zahira College, Colombo; University of Ceylon; Ceylon Law College; University of Jaffna
- Occupation: Journalist

Kalasuri Ratnadurai Sivagurunathan was a (7 October 1931 – 9 August 2003) Sri Lankan journalist, lawyer, academic and editor of Thinakaran.

== Early life ==
Sivagurunathan was born on 7 October 1931 in Kantharamadam in northern Ceylon. He was educated at St. John's College, Jaffna, Jaffna Hindu College and Zahira College, Colombo. After school he joined the University of Ceylon, Peradeniya. He then entered Ceylon Law College, qualifying as an advocate.

== Career ==
Sivagurunathan joined the Thinakaran in 1955 and worked as a reporter, sub-editor and lobby correspondent. He also worked for the Dinamina, another newspaper published by the Associated Newspapers of Ceylon Limited. He was appointed news editor of the Thinakaran in 1957, becoming its chief editor in 1961. He held this position until 1994.

Sivagurunathan obtained a MA degree from the University of Jaffna whilst working as a journalist. He was president of Working Journalists Association of Sri Lanka and a member of the Press Council.

== Later life ==
Sivagurunathan was a visiting lecturer at Sri Lanka Law College and the Open University of Sri Lanka.

Sivagurunathan was president of Colombo Tamil Sangam and was awarded the Kalasuri title, a Sri Lankan national honour, for his services to journalism.

Sivagurunathan died on 9 August 2003 in Colombo.
