= Tilko Jaffna City Hotel =

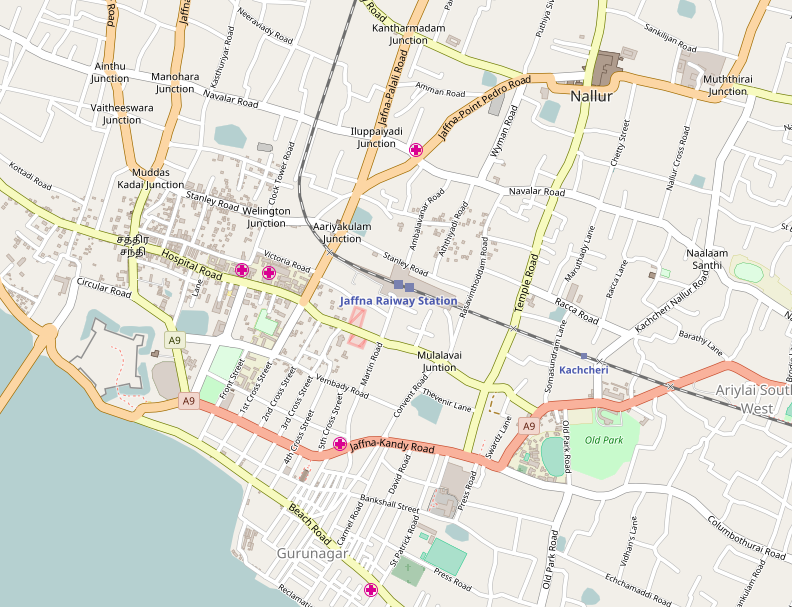
- Location within Central Jaffna
- Alternative names: Tilko Hotel

General information
- Location: 70/6, K.K.S. Road, Jaffna, Sri Lanka
- Coordinates: 9°39′55.80″N 80°0′38.70″E
- Opened: November 2010
- Owner: Tilko Jaffna City Hotel (Private) Limited

Technical details
- Floor count: 4

Other information
- Number of rooms: 42

Website
- cityhoteljaffna.com

Tilko Jaffna City Hotel (Tilko Hotel) is a hotel in the city of Jaffna in northern Sri Lanka. The four-storey 42 room hotel is located in the heart of the city on K.K.S. Road, near Jaffna Fort. Owned by British property developer Thilak T. Thilagaraj, the hotel opened in November 2010. The hotel was built with the support of the Board of Investment.
