= D. J. Ambalavanar =

Rt Rev. D. J. Ambalavanar
- Bishop of Jaffna
- Church: Church of South India
- Diocese: Jaffna
- Installed: 30 June 1971
- Term ended: 28 February 1993
- Predecessor: S. Kulendran
- Successor: S. Jebanesan

Personal details
- Born: 28 February 1928
- Died: 10 October 1997 (aged 69)
- Education: St. John's College; Jaffna College; Serampore College

The Right Reverend David Jeyaratnam Ambalavanar was a Sri Lankan Tamil priest and the Church of South India Bishop of Jaffna.

== Early life ==
Ambalavanar was born on 28 February 1928. He was the son of Reverend Joseph Ponnambalam Ambalavanar and Annamma. He was educated at St. John's College, Jaffna (1932–42) and Jaffna College (1942-50). He then went to Serampore College in India from where he obtained a B.D. degree in 1955. He obtained a B.A. degree from the University of London in 1959. In 1968 he received a M.Th. from King's College London.

Ambalavanar married Dr Chandraranee Kanapathipillai. They had two sons (Dr Devathayalan and Devadarshan).

== Career ==
After graduating in 1955 Ambalavanar served as minister in the Jaffna Diocese of the Church of South India. He became the second Church of South India Bishop of Jaffna on 30 June 1971. He retired on 28 February 1993.

Ambalavanar was Chairman of the Board of Directors of Jaffna College. Ambalavanar was a strong advocate of the civilian victims of the country's civil war. He was a missionary of the region beyond Elephant Pass in northern Sri Lanka who started working for the people affected by ethnicity of Sri Lanka. In 1979 he made to receive houses for difficult areas in Wanni such as Akkarayankulam, Vsuvamadu, Murikandy, Puthumurippu: these are the places of his work. He was a prophet of Jesus Christ.

== Death ==
Ambalavanar died on 10 October 1997 at Jaffna Hospital after a brief illness.
