= Subramaniam Park =

Public park in Sri Lanka

- சுப்பிரமணியம் பூங்கா
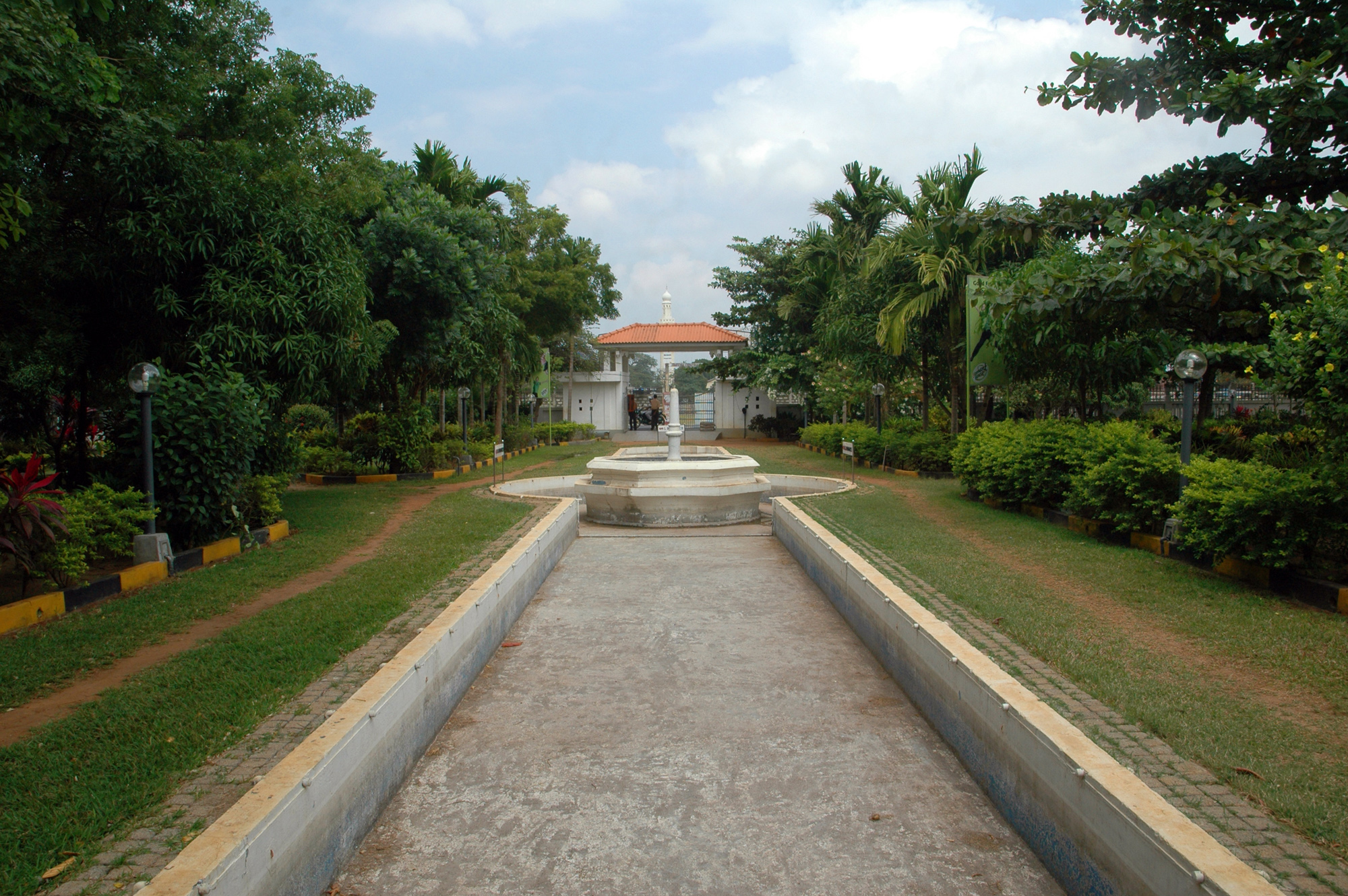

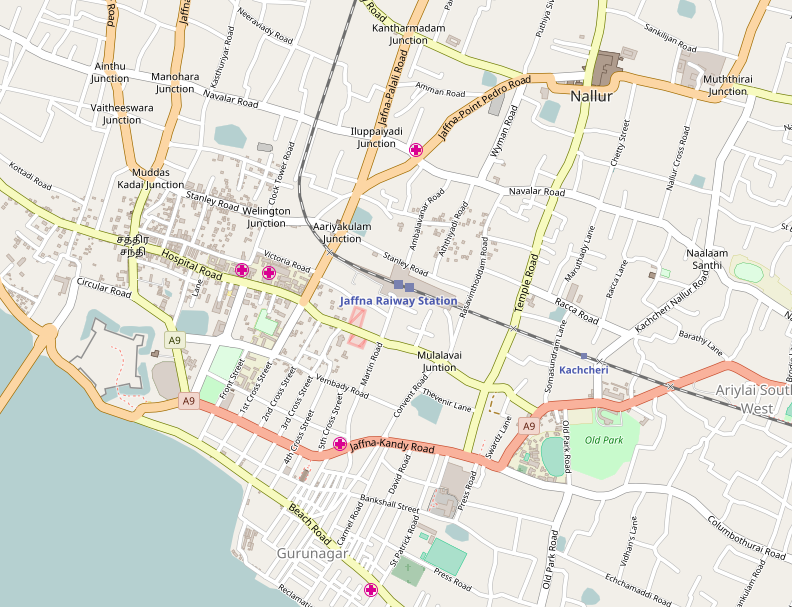
- Location within Central Jaffna
- Type: Urban park
- Location: Jaffna, Sri Lanka
- Coordinates: 9°39′39.60″N 80°00′45.50″E
- Operator: Jaffna Municipal Council

Subramaniam Children's Park (Tamil: சுப்பிரமணியம் சிறுவர் பூங்கா Cuppiramaṇiyam Ciṟuvar Pūṅkā; commonly known as Subramaniam Park) is an urban park in the city of Jaffna in northern Sri Lanka.

== History ==
Subramaniam Park was built in the 1950s by Jaffna Urban Council using a large donation provided by S. Subramaniam, a local physician. The park was named after Subramaniam. Subramaniam's nephew was V. Dharmalingam, later MP for Uduvil.

The park was severely damaged during the civil war and was destroyed in military operations in 1990. After being closed to the public for 14 years, renovation funded by Rs. 2 million provided by UNICEF began in 2004. The renovated park was re-opened by Jaffna District Secretary K. Ganesh on 7 May 2006. Additional renovations were undertaken by a Colombo based financial firm LB Finance in 2010, which included refurbishing of the park's fountain, which was one of the main attractions of the park. LB Finance will be maintaining the park in the future.
