= Adele Balasingham =

Australian-born Sri Lankan activist

- Born: Adele Ann Wilby; 30 January 1950 (age 76); Warragul, Australia
- Occupations: Trainer of the Liberation Tigers of Tamil Eelam's women's wing, Author
- Spouse: Anton Balasingham

Adele Ann Balasingham (born 30 January 1950), (née Wilby), is the Australian-born former leader of the women's wing of Liberation Tigers of Tamil Eelam of Sri Lanka.

== Biography ==
She was born in Warragul, Victoria in Australia. She became a professional nurse and worked in Gippsland, 150 km from Melbourne. She eventually migrated to the United Kingdom where in 1978 she met and married Sri Lankan-born British citizen Anton Balasingham. Mr. Balasingham later became the chief strategist and peace negotiator for the LTTE in Sri Lanka. Her husband Anton died on 14 December 2006.

== Eelam Tamil supporter ==
Adele Balasingham moved with her husband initially to Madras in India, then on to the northern part of Sri Lanka in Jaffna during the early stages of the Sri Lankan civil war. She worked for the welfare of women in the Tamil community who were adversely affected by the war.

== Peace negotiator ==
She later participated as part of the LTTE peace negotiating team in numerous peace talks with the various Sri Lankan government negotiating teams since 2002. She is also the author of a number of books including "Women Fighters of Liberation Tigers" (1993) and the semi-autobiographical The Will to Freedom. ISBN 1-903679-03-6

== See also ==
- Human Rights in Sri Lanka
- State terrorism in Sri Lanka
