= K. Arulanandan =

Professor K. Arulanandan AMICE
- Born: 2 August 1925
- Died: 11 August 2004 (aged 79); Kaiser Permanente Hospital, Walnut Creek, California
- Education: Jaffna College; University of Ceylon; University of Cambridge; UC Berkeley
- Occupation: Academic

Professor Kandiah Arulanandan (2 August 1925 – 11 August 2004) was a Ceylon Tamil engineer and academic. Known as Professor Arul, he was a lecturer at the University of California, Davis.

== Early life and family ==
Arulanandan was born on 2 August 1925. He was the son of V. Kandiah and Sivakolunthu from Achchuveli in northern British Ceylon. He was educated at the American Mission School in Achchuveli and Jaffna College, Vaddukoddai from where he passed the London matriculation in the First Division. After school he joined the University of Ceylon from where he graduated with degree in science. He then went to the University of Cambridge from where he obtained a Tripos degree in soil mechanics.

Arulanandan married Rajeswary, daughter of P. Velauthapillai and Meenambikai. They had three children (Dr. Chandranandan, Sivanandan and Rohini Solos).

== Career ==
After graduation Arulanandan received training on road research in the UK. Then from 1953 to 1957 he worked as a senior materials engineer in the Gold Coast. Between 1957 and 1958 he worked at the University of Cambridge under Professor Roscoe. Arulanandan returned to Ghana in 1959 to work as a senior materials engineer. In 1963 he joined the University of California, Berkeley from where he graduated with a PhD. He was then appointed to engineering faculty at the University of California, Davis. Arulanandan went on to become professor of engineering and specialised in geotechnical engineering.

== Death ==
Arulanandan died at the Kaiser Permanente Hospital, Walnut Creek, California on 11 August 2004. He was 79.
