= Passaiyoor =

Passaiyoor பாசையூர் පාසායුර්
- Suburb
- Location within Northern Province Location within Sri Lanka
- Coordinates: 9°39′05.90″N 80°01′42.70″E
- Country: Sri Lanka
- Province: Northern
- District: Jaffna
- DS Division: Jaffna

Government
  - Type: Municipal Council
  - Body: Jaffna

Population
  - Total: 2,440
- Time zone: UTC+5:30 (Sri Lanka Standard Time Zone)

Passaiyoor (Tamil: பாசையூர், romanized: Pācaiyūr, Sinhala: පාසායුර්, romanized: Pāsāyur) also spelled Pasaiyur, is a suburb of the city of Jaffna in northern Sri Lanka. The suburb is divided into two village officer divisions (Passaiyoor East and Passaiyoor West) whose combined population was 2,440 at the 2012 census.

== Etymology ==
Passaiyoor, also spelt Passaiyur, derives its words from the Tamil words pāci and ūr (village). Pāci can mean fishery, but is also a name of the sea god Varuna. The village has also been recorded as Passur in some historical counts of Jaffna.

== History ==
The earliest settlers of Jaffna, were according to local legend, a musician and his kinsfolk. According to scholars is the place surrounding Gurunagar, Colombuthurai and Passaiyoor the surmised place where they first settled.
