= K. Balasingam =

K. Balasingam MLC
- க. பாலசிங்கம்
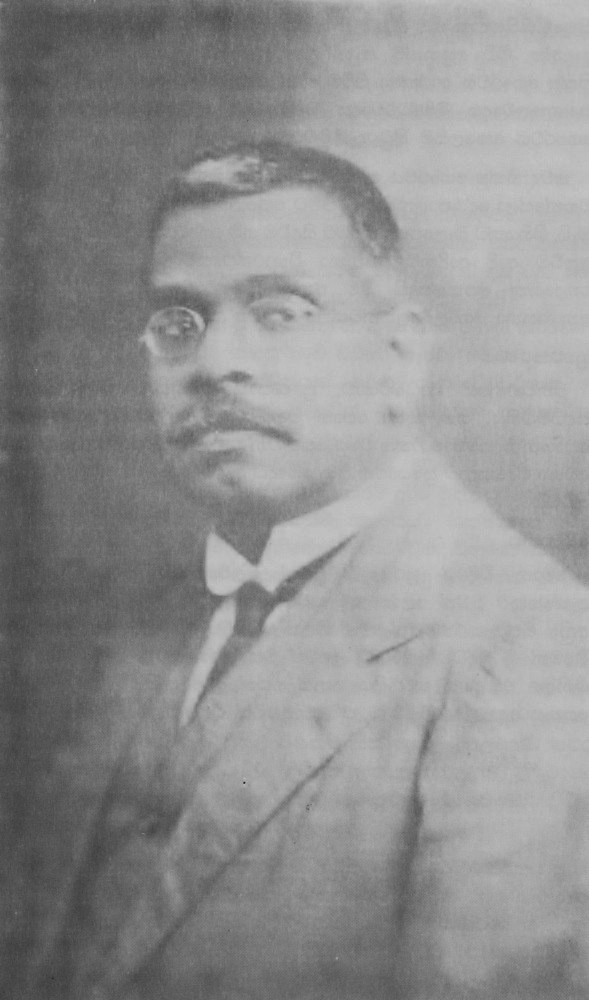

Unofficial Member (Tamil), Legislative Council of Ceylon

Personal details
- Born: 23 June 1876 Udupiddy, Ceylon
- Died: 4 September 1952 (aged 76)
- Education: Jaffna College; Royal College, Colombo
- Profession: Lawyer
- Ethnicity: Ceylon Tamil

Kathiravetpillai Balasingam (Tamil: கதிரவேற்பிள்ளை பாலசிங்கம்; 23 June 1876 – 4 September 1952) was a Ceylon Tamil lawyer and member of the Legislative Council of Ceylon and Executive Council of Ceylon.

== Early life and family ==
Balasingam was born on 23 June 1876 in Udupiddy in northern Ceylon. He was the son of Kathiravetpillai. Balasingam was educated at Jaffna College and Royal College, Colombo.

Balasingam had a son (Cumaraswamy) and a daughter.

== Career ==
Balasingam joined the legal profession after finishing his education. He practised law in Colombo and became a District Judge.

== Later life ==
After retirement Balasingam was appointed to the Legislative Council of Ceylon in 1914 as the second Tamil member. He was appointed to the Executive Council of Ceylon in 1924. He played a key role in the establishment of the College of Ayurvedic Medicine, Hospital of Indigenous Medicine, State Mortgage Bank, Judicial Services Commission and the Public Trustee's Department. He was also one of the earliest proponents of diverting the waters of the Mahaweli River to assist farming.

Balasingam died on 4 September 1952. A 60 cents commemorative stamp honouring Balasingam was issued on 22 May 1984.
