= Batticaloa Teaching Hospital =

- Ministry of Health, Sri Lanka
- Location in central Batticaloa

Geography
- Location: Batticaloa, Batticaloa District, Eastern Province, Sri Lanka
- Coordinates: 7°42′27.20″N 81°41′26.30″E

Organisation
- Care system: Public
- Type: Teaching
- Affiliated university: Eastern University

Services
- Emergency department: Yes
- Beds: 900

Links
- Website: www.thbatti.health.gov.lk
- Lists: Hospitals in Sri Lanka

Batticaloa Teaching Hospital is a government hospital in Batticaloa, Sri Lanka. It is the leading hospital in the Eastern Province and is controlled by the central government in Colombo. The hospital is the only teaching hospital in the Eastern Province. The hospital is the main clinical teaching facility for the faculty of health care sciences of Eastern University. As of 2010 it had 900 beds.
