= Mandur (Sri Lanka) =

Coordinates: 7°29′N 81°45′E

Mandur or Mantur (மண்டூர்) is a village situated within the Eastern Batticaloa District of Sri Lanka. Most of the inhabitants are of Sri Lankan Tamil descent. Mandur is known for its temple dedicated to Hindu deity Murugan. It is known as the Mandur Sri Kandaswaami temple (sinna kathirkamam).
