= Daniel Thiagarajah =

Sri Lankan Tamil bishop

The Right Reverend Daniel Thiagarajah
- Bishop of Jaffna
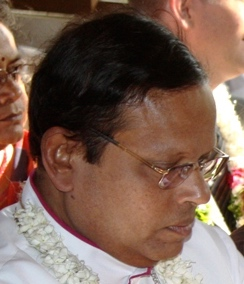
- Church: Church of South India
- Diocese: Jaffna
- Installed: 2006
- Term ended: 2022
- Predecessor: S. Jebanesan
- Successor: The Rt. Rev. Dr. V. Pathmathayalan

Personal details
- Education: Jaffna Central College

Daniel Selvaratnam Thiagarajah is a Sri Lankan Tamil bishop who served as the fourth Bishop of Jaffna in the Church of South India. From 2006–2022

== Early life ==
Thiagarajah was educated at Jaffna Central College.

== Career ==
Thiagarajah was consecrated as the fourth Church of South India Bishop of Jaffna on 21 August 2006. Some members of the diocese objected to the procedures used in Thiagarajah's appointment and took legal action. At point the diocesan council severed all links with the Church of South India.
