= Kokkuvil =

Kokuvil கொக்குவில் කොක්කුවිල්
- Town
- Location in Sri Lanka
- Coordinates: 9°41′30″N 80°1′15″E
- Country: Sri Lanka
- Province: Northern
- District: Jaffna
- DS Division: Nallur

Kokuvil (Tamil: கொக்குவில்) is a suburb in the northern Sri Lankan city of Jaffna.

== Battle ==
14 Indian Soldiers are Killed in Batlle of Kokuvil During IPKF operations in Sri Lanka.

== Transport ==
- Kokuvil railway station

== Schools ==
- Kokuvil Hindu College

== Notable people ==
- Appadurai Muttulingam - Popular Tamil Writer
- Arunachalam Sabapathy - member of Legislative Council of Ceylon, a founder of Jaffna Hindu College
