= Saturday Review (Sri Lankan newspaper) =

Sri Lankan English language newspaper

- Type: Weekly newspaper
- Owner: New Era Publications Limited
- Founded: 30 January 1982
- Ceased publication: October 1987
- Language: English
- City: Jaffna
- Country: Sri Lanka
- OCLC number: 38072237

The Saturday Review was an English-language weekly newspaper in Sri Lanka published by New Era Publications Limited. It was founded in 1982 and was published from Jaffna. It ceased publication in 1987.

== History ==
The Saturday Review was founded in 1982 by K. Kanthasamy, K. C. Thangarajah and others. The paper was published by a company called Kalai Nilayam and its first editor was S. Sivanayagam. The first edition of the paper was published on 30 January 1982. The paper was bought by New Era Publications Limited in August 1982.

The Saturday Review was shut down by the Sri Lankan government on 1 July 1983 using the recently passed emergency law - the Emergency (Miscellaneous Provisions and Powers) Regulations 1983. The police sealed the paper's offices the next day. Fearing arrest, Sivanayagam escaped to Tamil Nadu, India in September 1983 with the help of the rebel Liberation Tigers of Tamil Eelam (LTTE). The bans on the Saturday Review and another paper, the Suthanthiran, were lifted on 24 January 1984 but the papers were subject to strict censorship by the government. A fundamental rights petition contesting the government's ban on the Saturday Review was heard by the Supreme Court with leading lawyer S. Nadesan acting for the paper. The petition was dismissed by the court.

Gamini Navaratne took over as editor of the paper in February 1984 when the newspaper was restarted. As the civil war escalated newspapers published from Jaffna came under pressure from both government forces and the rebel militant groups. The Saturday Review ceased publishing in October 1987. There were attempts to revive the paper in 1988 but these came to an end with the kidnap and murder of Kanthasamy in June 1988.
