= Kokkuvil Hindu College =

Kokuvil Hindu College
- கொக்குவில் இந்துக் கல்லூரி

Location
- K.K.S. Road, Kokkuvil East; Kokuvil, Jaffna District, Northern Province; Sri Lanka; 9°41′42.10″N 80°0′53.10″E

Information
- School type: Public provincial 1AB
- Founded: 1910
- Founder: Mr.Chelliah Mr.Sabaratnam Mr.A.Sabapathy
- School district: Jaffna Education Zone
- Authority: Northern Provincial Council
- School number: 1002004
- Principal: Mr.P.Vasanthan
- Teaching staff: 87
- Grades: 6-13
- Gender: Mixed
- Age range: 11-19

Kokuvil Hindu College (Tamil: கொக்குவில் இந்துக் கல்லூரி Kokkuvil Intuk Kallūri, KHC) is a provincial school in Kokkuvil, Sri Lanka.

During colonial times, Christianity had a great influence on people and education was in the hands of Missionaries. As English was the official language then, there were only English medium schools. In the year 1900, three dignified people had a desire to start a school in Kokuvil. They were teachers of Jaffna Hindu College namely Mr. Somaskanthar, Mr. Chelliah and Mr. Appakuddi. With the support of well-wishers, a school was begun in Appakuddi's house. When students came from other villages to attend the school the number of students increased and the school was recognised as primary institution and Mr. Chelliah was appointed as the first Head Master by The Jaffna Hindu Board.

In 1926, Tamil divisions were extended up to grade 5 while the English division was upgraded to J.S.C and the school was promoted to "C" Grade. In 1939, the school status was upgraded to "B" Grade and for the first time, the inter-house athletic meet was held at the ground which was used for the railway station. Today the Technical College is situated there. The school flag was designed in white and red. A library too was formed. In 1966, school was promoted to super grade 1AB. In 1972 the KHC primary school was separated as a separate institution. Due to the civil war displacement, the college began to function in Thenmaradchi. In 1998, a computer lab was established with new facilities. In 2010, KHC celebrated its centenary year on a grant scale.

== History ==
The colonial Government handed over the monopoly of education in Sri Lanka (then Ceylon) to anglicized clergy-the three Protestant Christian missions: The Anglican mission, The American mission, the Wesleyan mission-and gave them financial assistance because its definitive policy was to convert the people of Ceylon to Christianity through education. But Catholics, Buddhists, Hindus and Muslims were left out. Christophe Ernest Bonjean, a French missionary who was Bishop of Jaffna and later Bishop of Colombo, headed the agitation and strongly advocated a school system which permitted each religious denomination to open and conduct schools for its children with financial aid from the state.

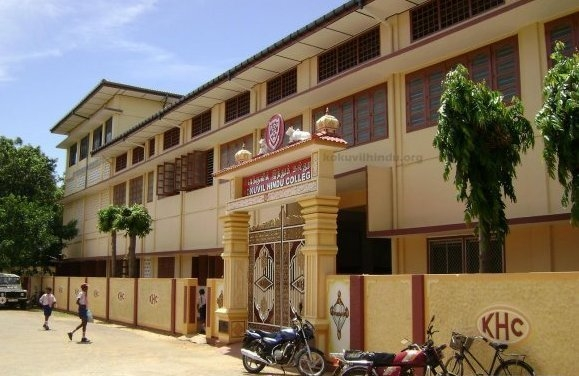
Front view of the Kokuvil Hindu College

So in 1865, a committee was appointed by the legislative council to enquire into and report on education. On a recommendation by this committee, the Govt. abolished the Protestant dominated Central School Commission set up in 1841 and, in its place, established in 1869, the Department of Public Instruction, which now exists as the Department of Education. The committee also laid down two principles regarding Education in the country: (1. that every religious denomination could open schools for its children (2. that Government Grants would be given impartially to all such schools that provided a sound secular education.

These principles formed the basis of the Denominational School System, which came into being and has been known also as the Grants-in-aid System or Assisted School System.

Kokuvil Hindu College was one of the many schools that came under this system; this is confirmed by the following extract taken from the Jaffna Hindu College magazine (vol. 11) of March 1912 No.1. Kokuvil Hindu English School Mr. E. Chelliah, the Head master of the Primary Department of Jaffna Hindu College, has taken in-charge of this school as its permanent Head master. The school is gaining popularity and strength under the able supervision of Mr. Chelliah. The manager has applied to the Dept. of Public Instruction for its registration as a Grant-in-aid institution. This system of education developed extensively in the country and lasted nearly a century until the State take-over of schools in 1960. Thus, the state on the one hand and the religious denomination on the other became partners in education.

== Old Students' Associations ==
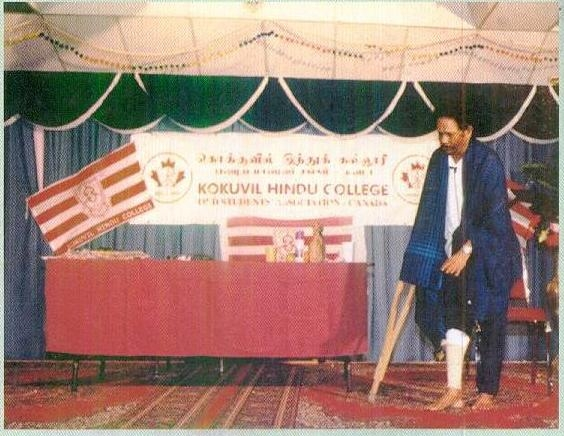
Late Nagalingam Subramaniam(Markham Maniam) is seen acting at a drama organized by the Old Students' Association in Markham, Ontario, Canada in 2001.

Kokkuvil Hindu College's Old Students' Associations are formed in number of countries and are very active. They contribute to the college's well-fare by raising fund organizing various programs.

Canadian Old Students' Association[KHC OSA (Canada)] has been functioning since 1994 and actively involve in organizing cultural and social events called Magudam every year. The members of the Students association work actively in promoting the school and taking care of its various needs of infrastructure and basic amenities.

UK OSA has sponsored more than 20 students up to 2007.

== See also ==
- List of schools in Northern Province, Sri Lanka
