= Jaffna Diocese of the Church of South India =

Diocese of the Church of South India in Sri Lanka

Diocese of Jaffna

Location
- Country: Sri Lanka

Information
- Denomination: Protestantism
- Established: 27 September 1947
- Cathedral: St. Thomas' Cathedral, Vaddukoddai

Current leadership
- Bishop of Jaffna: Rt. Rev. Dr. V. Pathmathayalan

Website
- [#]

The Jaffna Diocese is the Church of South India diocese for northern Sri Lanka. The current bishop (known as the Bishop of Jaffna or the Bishop of the Church of South India in the Jaffna Diocese) is Rt. Rev. Dr. V. Pathmathayalan. The Church of South India is a United Protestant denomination.

== History ==
The Church of South India was established on 27 September 1947 as a union of the South India Provincial Synod of Methodist Church, the South India United Church (Congregational, Presbyterian and Reformed) and the southern dioceses of the Church of India, Pakistan, Burma and Ceylon (Anglican). The Jaffna Diocese of the Church of South India (JDCSI) was one of the 24 dioceses of the new church. Sabapathy Kulendran was enthroned as the first Bishop of Jaffna on 10 October 1947.

== Bishops ==
#	Bishop	Took office	Left office
1st	S. Kulendran	1947	1970
2nd	D. J. Ambalavanar	1971	1993
3rd	S. Jebanesan	1993	2005
4th	Daniel Thiagarajah	2006	2022
5th	Veluppillai Pathmathyalan	2023	
