= Chundikuli =

Chundikuli சுண்டிக்குளி චුන්දිකුලි
- Suburb
- Location within Northern Province Location within Sri Lanka
- Coordinates: 9°39′24.80″N 80°01′41.10″E
- Country: Sri Lanka
- Province: Northern
- District: Jaffna
- DS Division: Jaffna

Government
  - Type: Municipal Council
  - Body: Jaffna

Population (2012)
  - Total: 3,618
- Time zone: UTC+5:30 (Sri Lanka Standard Time Zone)
- Post Codes: 4136075-4136080
- Telephone Codes: 021
- Vehicle registration: NP

Chundikuli (Tamil: சுண்டிக்குளி, romanized: Cuṇṭikkuḷi; Sinhala: චුන්දිකුලි Cundikuli) is a suburb of the city of Jaffna in northern Sri Lanka. Chundikuli means "the pond of the cunti plant" in Tamil and is derived from the Tamil words cunti (several aquatic plants from the mimosa genus) and kuli (pond). The suburb is divided into two village officer divisions (Chundikuli North and Chundikuli South) whose combined population was 3,618 at the 2012 census.

== Schools ==
- Chundikuli Girls' College
