= Levi Spaulding =

The Reverend Levi Spaulding
- Born: August 22, 1791; Jaffery, New Jersey
- Died: June 18, 1873 (aged 81)
- Education: Dartmouth College
- Alma mater: Andover Theological Seminary
- Occupation: Christian missionary

Levi Spaulding (22 August 1791 – 18 June 1873) was a missionary for the American Board of Commissioners for Foreign Missions to Ceylon (now Sri Lanka), and led a team of American missionaries to choose the American Madura Mission site for the Tamil people of South India.

He was an evangelist, hymnist and published a Tamil dictionary and an English-Tamil dictionary.

== Biography ==
=== Early life ===
He was born on 22 August 1791 in Jaffrey, New Hampshire, to Elisabeth and Phinehas Spaulding. He pursued a career as a farmer until the death of his father in 1809. He graduated from Dartmouth College in 1815 and Andover Theological Seminary in the Tabernacle Church, Salem, Massachusetts in 1818. Along with Henry Woodward, Fisk, and Miron Winslow he was ordained by the American Board of Commissioners for Foreign Missions (ABCFM) in 1818 and was married to Mary Christie the same year.

=== Missionary work ===
As a missionary under ABCFM, he along with fellow-missionaries like John Scudder, the first medical missionary, sailed for Calcutta, India on 8 June 1819 from Boston and arrived Jaffna, Ceylon, on 1 December 1820. Upon his arrival at the mission station, he was initially placed at Manepay (also spelled as Manipay), where he served between 1821 and 1828; later, he served at Tellippalai (also spelled Tillipally) from 1828 and 1833.

He spent most of his missionary career at Oodooville (also spelled Uduville or Uduvil), where he supervised the church, schools, and did evangelistic work among heathens in villages. Besides his work in school at Oodooville, he was a preacher who preferred to go into the crowd and reach them in their own idiom; hence, he got to know the natives mind and heart better than other missionaries. His wife Mary Spaulding took charge of the girl's boarding school in Uduvelli for almost forty years. In January 1834, he led the group of American missionaries to explore the suitable locations for a new ABCFM mission station to the Tamil people of South India; thus, Madura, also spelled Madurai, was identified as the right site for new American Madura Mission under the guidance of Levi Spaulding. In July 1834, Henry Richard Hoisington and William Todd visited; subsequently, Hoisington returned after two months while Todd remained.

He died at an age of eighty-one on 18 June 1873 after fifty-four years of missionary service in India and Sri Lanka.

== Bibliography ==
From 1838, he devoted much of his time in revisions for mission press and translation activities. He published a translation of Pilgrim's Progress and wrote hymns. He also wrote tracts which included Social Hymns and Sacred Songs. In 1852, he compiled and published a Tamil dictionary and an English-Tamil dictionary.

He also spent considerable time at Madras, a mission station of American Madras Mission, at the behest of Bible Society in Madras for the revision of Scriptures. While at Oodooville, he made sure he translated at least one page of Bible into Tamil language, a day.

== See also ==
- Union College, Tellippalai
- American Ceylon Mission
