= C. Balasingham =

C. Balasingham CCS
- Born: 10 March 1917
- Died: 15 July 2001 (aged 84); Connecticut, USA
- Education: Kollankaladdy Tamil School; Mahajana College; Jaffna Hindu College; Ceylon University College; Ceylon Law College
- Occupation: Civil servant

Coomarasamy Balasingham (10 March 1917 – 15 July 2001) was a leading Ceylon Tamil civil servant.

== Early life ==
Balasingham was born on 10 March 1917. He was the son of V. Coomaraswamy, a proctor and Tamil scholar from Tellippalai. He was educated at Kollankaladdy Tamil School, Mahajana College, Tellippalai and Jaffna Hindu College. He gained Honours and a Distinction in Tamil when he sat the Cambridge Junior Examination. He then passed the Cambridge Senior Exam. After school he joined the Ceylon University College from where he graduated in 1937 with a BA degree English, Tamil and Philosophy. He was too young to join the civil service so he enrolled at the Ceylon Law College, qualifying as an advocate of the Supreme Court in 1942.

Balasingham married Sethu, a daughter of Gate Mudaliyar Naganather Canaganayagam. They had two sons (Balagangeyan and Padmanabhan) and a daughter (Thillaisiva).

== Career ==
Balasingham joined the Ceylon Civil Service in 1940 after passing the Civil Service Exam in 1939. He held several positions and served in a number of places. He was an Additional Magistrate at Matara and Puttalam; Assistant Telegraph Censor during World War II; Office Assistant in Jaffna and Kandy; Additional Assistant Government Agent in Horana; Assistant Government Agent in Kalutara; Deputy Controller of Labour in Hatton and Colombo; and Assistant Director of Land Development in Batticaloa.

He became Controller of Supply, Cadre and Finance in the Treasury in 1958 and Deputy Secretary to the Treasury in 1961. Balasingham was Permanent Secretary at the Ministry of Health from 1964 to 1970.

== Later life ==
Balasingham was chairman of the committee revising the Government Financial Regulations and a member of the Salaries Review Committee. He moved to the USA in 1984. He died on 15 July 2001 in Connecticut.
