= Hoisington =

Hoisington may refer to:

- Hoisington, Kansas, a town in the United States
  - Hoisington (baseball), a minor league baseball team
- Al Hoisington, American football player
- Elizabeth P. Hoisington, American Army officer, one of the first women to attain the rank of Brigadier General
- Gary Hoisington, birth name of Gary Indiana, American writer, actor, artist, and cultural critic
- Henry Richard Hoisington, a 19th-century American missionary
- Joab Hoisington, American Revolution patriot
- Vincent Hoisington, Singaporean painter and sculptor
