= Uduvil Girls' College =

- உடுவில் மகளிர் கல்லூரி

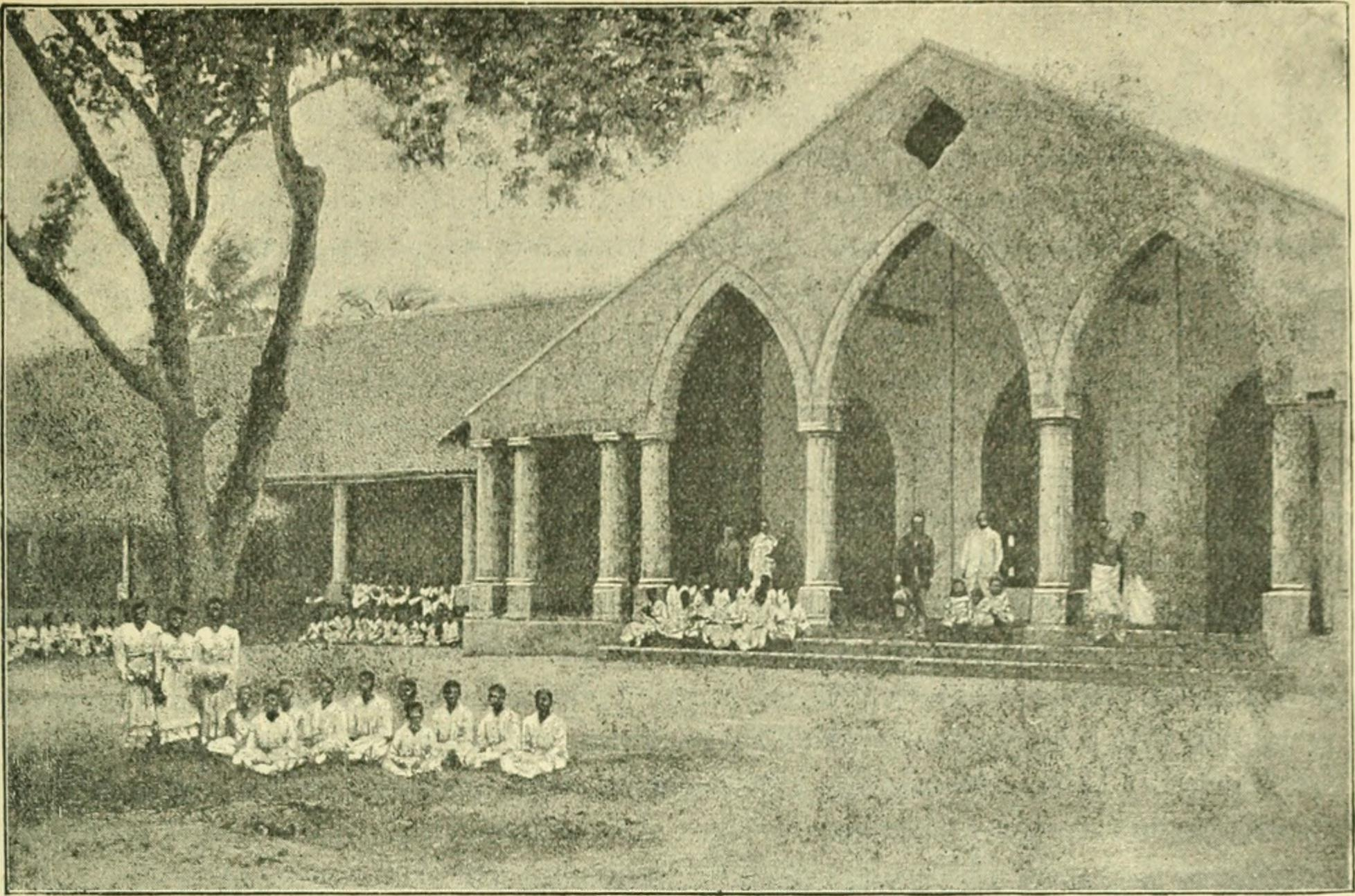
- The college in the late 19th century

Location
- Uduvil, Jaffna District, Northern Province; Sri Lanka; 9°44′04.40″N 80°00′57.70″E

Information
- Type: Private
- Motto: The Truth shall make You Free
- Denomination: Protestant
- Founded: 1824; 202 years ago
- Founder: Harriet Winslow
- School district: Valikaamam Education Zone
- Authority: Jaffna Diocese of the Church of South India
- Principal: Miss Mathuramathy Kulendran
- Grades: 1-13
- Language: Tamil, English
- Houses: Agnew, Winslow, Howland, Bookwalter
- Colours: Blue, green, red, and yellow
- Song: "Oh Uduvil! Dear Uduvil!"

Uduvil Girls' College (Tamil: உடுவில் மகளிர் கல்லூரி Uduvil Makalir Kallūri, UGC) is a girls private school in Uduvil, Sri Lanka. Founded in 1820 by American missionaries, it is one of Sri Lanka's oldest schools.

== History ==
In 1816 American missionaries founded the American Ceylon Mission in Jaffna. The ACM established missions in other parts of the Jaffna Peninsula including one in Vaddukoddai. The ACM established numerous schools on the peninsula, the first school being the Common Free School (Union College) in Tellippalai. In 1820 the Uduvil Seminary was established in Uduvil. It was situated in an abandoned Franciscan mission built by the Portuguese. Harriet Winslow (1796–1823), a missionary turned it into an all-girls school in 1824. It was called Missionary Seminary and Female Central School.

Uduvil has had eight principals at its helm. Eliza Agnew took over as principal after Harriet Winslow then followed by Susan Howland and Lulu Bookwalter, Uduvil's last American principal. Ariam Hudson Paramasamy was the first Sri Lankan principal, and was followed by Saraswathy Somasundaram in 1970 and Chelvi Selliah in 1982. She was followed by Shiranee Mills. In her period the school had a great time with competitions. Uduvil's current principal is Suneetha Patricia Jebaratnam.

== The school today ==
There are three specific units in the school namely, the Primary, Secondary and the Further Education Program. The secondary section prepares students for local examinations in the Tamil medium and English medium. The Further Education Program (FEP) aspires to strengthen students through skills development such as accounting, music, English and IT. The Eliza Agnew Business Processing Outsourcing Centre trains school leavers on online accounting and IT skills.

== 190th Anniversary ==
Uduvil Girls’ College celebrated its 190th anniversary in the year 2014.

== See also ==
- List of schools in Northern Province, Sri Lanka
