= Thangamma Appakutty =

Sri Lankan social activist

- Born: 7 January 1925; Tellipalai, Jaffna
- Died: 15 June 2008 (aged 83)
- Occupations: social activist, philanthropist, educator
- Known for: works related to Hinduism

Kala Suri Thangamma Appakutty (7 January 1925 – 15 June 2008) was a Sri Lankan philanthropist, veteran religious personality, educator and social activist. She is recognised for her notable works on Saivism and was regarded as one of the main pillars in developing Hinduism in Sri Lanka.

== Career ==
Thangamma had her primary education at Ramanathan College, Chunakam. She became a well trained teacher in 1945 and served as a teacher at the Union College, Tellippalai for 12 years. She continued her teaching for nearly 31 years before calling her time in 1976. She pursued her career mainly in charity and religious work after she retired from teaching. She lectured on the importance of Saivism and helped renovate and establish temples including the Tellippalai Durga Kovil. Thangamma became a pundit in Tamil and Saivism in 1952.

She was also well known for her social work during the Sri Lankan Civil War, during which she helped several women and children who were terribly affected. She was also instrumental in developing Education in Jaffna by helping construct libraries and schools.

== Recognition ==
The University of Jaffna honored her with an honorary doctorate degree in 1998 for her contributions in the development of education in Jaffna. The Government of Sri Lanka honored her with the prestigious title Kala Suri in 1991 recognising her services towards the society.

== Death ==
Appakutty died at the age of 83 on 15 June 2008 due to illness.
