= S. Vaiyapuri Pillai =

Tamil writer

Rao Sahib S. Vaiyapuri Pillai
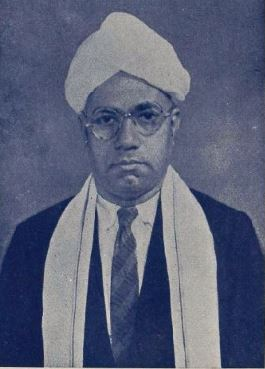
- Vaiyapuri Pillai in 1936
- Born: 12 October 1891; Tinnevely District, Madras Presidency, British India (now Tirunelveli district, Tamil Nadu, India)
- Died: 17 February 1956 (aged 64)
- Occupations: Lawyer, publisher
- Known for: Tamil Scholar, publisher

Rao Sahib Saravanapperumal Vaiyapuri Pillai (12 October 1891 – 17 February 1956) was a renowned lawyer and Tamil scholar. An advocate by profession, he edited and published several Tamil classics from original manuscripts. He is best remembered as the editor of the Tamil lexicon published by the Madras University in the 1920s. He was a voracious reader and had in his own private collection thousands of books in Tamil, English, Sanskrit and Malayalam. His collection also included hundreds of palm-leaf manuscripts. This collection was later donated to the National Library of India in Kolkata. .

== Early life and education ==
Vaiyapuri Pillai was born in 1891 to Saravanapperumal Pillai and Pappammal in a Saiva Vellalar family of Tinnevely District. After graduating in 1912, he studied law and practised as a lawyer in Trivandrum and Tinnevely from 1915 to 1926.

== Editor of the Tamil lexicon ==
On November 25, 1926, Pillai was appointed editor of the Tamil lexicon committee of the Madras University. Until then, Volume I of the lexicon and the first part of Volume II had been published over a span of fourteen years. But once Pillai took over, the remainder of the lexicon which comprised six volumes was completed in just ten years.

== Later years ==
From 1951 to 1954, Pillai served as Honorary Professor of Tamil at the University of Travancore in Trivandrum. Retiring in 1954, he returned to Madras city where he died on 17 February 1956.

== Controversies ==
In June 1940, the government of Madras Province appointed a committee headed by V. S. Srinivasa Sastri to frame general principles for coining words for scientific and technical terms in Tamil. The constitution of the committee was opposed by Tamil purists who felt that Sastri was strongly anti-Tamil. Sastri precipitated matters further by recommending the inclusion of Vaiyapuri Pillai, who was also perceived to be anti-Tamil. The committee eventually recommended the retention of words of English and Sanskrit origin. Vaiyapuri justified the decision as a necessity for promoting national integration and cited the poetry of Manonmaniam Sundaram Pillai. The decisions of the committee were opposed tooth and nail by activists of the Madras Presidency Tamil Sangam and were eventually reversed after Sastri's death in 1946.

== Literary works Nationalised ==
In February 2009, the Tamil Nadu state government announced that the works of 28 scholars would be nationalised and the literary critic, Vaiyapuri Pillai's works were among them. In his budget address, finance minister K. Anbazhagan said compensation would be paid to the legal heirs of the authors having regard to the number of books written by them, their social impact and literary value. With a view to ensuring that the views and thoughts of great Tamil savants who dedicated their lives to the language benefitted the present and future generations, the government implemented the nationalization scheme.

== See also ==
- Tamil Lexicon dictionary
