= Sabaratnam Arulkumaran =

Obstetricians

Sir Sabaratnam Arulkumaran FRCOG FRCS
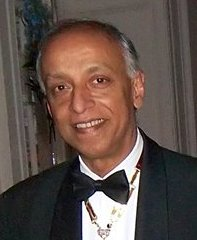

President of the Royal College of Obstetricians and Gynaecologists
- In office 2007–2010
- Preceded by: Allan Templeton
- Succeeded by: Anthony Dale Falconer

President of the International Federation of Gynaecology and Obstetrics
- In office 2012–2015
- Preceded by: Gamal Serour

President of the British Medical Association
- In office 2013–2014
- Preceded by: Sheila Hollins
- Succeeded by: Ilora Finlay

Personal details
- Born: 1948 (age 77–78)
- Education: Jaffna Central College; Mahajana College; University of Ceylon; National University of Singapore
- Profession: Physician
- Ethnicity: Sri Lankan Tamil

Sir Sabaratnam Arulkumaran is a Sri Lankan Tamil obstetrician and gynaecologist, academic and medical administrator. He is a professor emeritus of Obstetrics and Gynaecology at City St George’s, University of London, Foundation Professor at the University of Nicosia Medical School in Cyprus, and a visiting professor at Imperial College London. He served as president of the Royal College of Obstetricians and Gynaecologists from 2007 to 2010, the International Federation of Gynecology and Obstetrics from 2012 to 2015 and the British Medical Association from 2013 to 2014. His work has focused on maternal health, childbirth, obstetric research and maternity services. He was appointed Knight Bachelor in 2009 for services to medicine.

== Early life and family ==
Arulkumaran was born in 1948. He was the son of K. Sabaratnam, a Director of the Jaffna Co-operative Society, and Gnambikai. He was from Kantharmadam in northern Ceylon. He was educated at Jaffna Central College and Mahajana College, Tellippalai. After school he joined the University of Ceylon in 1968 and graduated with an honours MBBS degree in 1972. He then obtained a Diploma in Child Health from the university. He then entered the National University of Singapore from where he obtained MD and PhD degrees. He then became a fellow of the Royal College of Obstetricians and Gynaecologists and the Royal College of Surgeons of Edinburgh.

== Career ==
Arulkumaran joined the National University of Singapore in 1982 as a lecturer.He subsequently became senior lecturer and associate professor before being appointed professor of obstetrics and gynaecology in 1993. He served as head of the department from 1995 to 1997.

In 1997, he moved to the United Kingdom and joined the University of Nottingham as professor of obstetrics and gynaecology. He held the position until 2001, when he became professor and head of the Department of Obstetrics and Gynaecology at St George’s, University of London. He led the department until 2013 and was later appointed professor emeritus. Since 2013, he has served as Foundation Professor of Obstetrics and Gynaecology at the University of Nicosia Medical School and as a visiting professor at Imperial College London.

=== Professional leadership ===
Arulkumaran was treasurer of the International Federation of Gynaecology and Obstetrics (1997-2003), its secretary-general (2003-2006) and was its president from 2012 to 2015. He served as vice-president of the Royal College of Obstetricians and Gynaecologists before serving as its president from 2007 to 2010. In June 2012, he was elected president of the British Medical Association for 2013-2014.Arulkumaran has been editor-in-chief of Best Practices and Research in Clinical Obstetrics and Gynaecology since 1998.

== Research and publications ==
Arulkumaran's research has focused on obstetrics, maternal health and the management of childbirth. His areas of study include induction of labour, prelabour rupture of membranes, postpartum haemorrhage, fetal monitoring, uterine activity and the assessment of fetal wellbeing.

He has participated in international clinical research on maternal health. He chaired the steering committee of the WOMAN trial, which investigated the use of tranexamic acid to reduce deaths from postpartum haemorrhage. He has also contributed to research on assisted vaginal birth, including the ASSIST studies of the Odon device.

Arulkumaran has authored and edited numerous medical textbooks and reference works. His books include Fetal Monitoring in Practice (1992), which examines methods of monitoring fetal wellbeing during pregnancy and labour, and The Management of Labour (1996), on the clinical management of childbirth. He also contributed to reference works on obstetric emergencies and postpartum haemorrhage, including A Comprehensive Textbook of Postpartum Haemorrhage (2012), which addresses the prevention and treatment of severe bleeding after childbirth.

He edited Best Practice in Labour and Delivery, a clinical reference on the management of childbirth. Its third edition, published by Cambridge University Press in 2025, covers labour management, fetal monitoring, obstetric emergencies, clinical skills and the organisation of maternity care. He was also one of the editors of Oxford Textbook of Obstetrics and Gynaecology (2020).

Other works include Oxford Desk Reference: Obstetrics and Gynaecology (2011), Intrapartum Care for the MRCOG and Beyond (2011) and Algorithms for Obstetrics and Gynaecology (2014). He also served as editor-in-chief of Best Practice & Research in Clinical Obstetrics & Gynaecology for approximately 20 years and contributed to international medical journals.

== Maternal health ==
In 2003, Arulkumaran was involved in the reorganisation of maternity services at Northwick Park Hospital in London following concerns about maternal deaths and the quality of care. In 2012, he was appointed chair of the independent investigation into the death of Savita Halappanavar at University Hospital Galway in Ireland. The investigation's report, published in 2013, identified failures in the assessment and monitoring of her condition and made recommendations concerning maternity care. It also called for consideration of the legal framework governing the management of pregnancy complications. Arulkumaran subsequently gave evidence to the Oireachtas Committee on the Eighth Amendment in 2017. He has also worked on programmes to expand access to long-acting reversible contraception after childbirth in several countries, including Sri Lanka, India, Bangladesh, Nepal, Kenya and Tanzania.

== Awards and honours ==
- 2009: Appointed Knight Bachelor in the Queen's Birthday Honours for services to medicine.
- 2014: Member of the U.S. National Academy of Sciences.
- 2017: Awarded an honorary doctorate by Odessa National Medical University, Ukraine.
- 2019: Sri Lanka Ranjana
- 2019:Active Citizen award from the President of Cyprus.
