= Allen Abraham =

Ceylon Tamil academic (1865–1922)

Allen Abraham FRAS
- Born: S. Ambalavanar; 1865; Karainagar, Ceylon
- Died: 9 July 1922 (aged 56–57)
- Education: Jaffna College
- Occupation: Academic

Allen Abraham (1865 – 9 July 1922; born Subramaniar Ambalavanar) was a Ceylon Tamil academic and astronomer.

== Early life and family ==
Ambalavanar was born in 1865 in Karainagar on the island of Karaitivu in northern Ceylon. He was the son of Kanthappar Subramaniar and Paravathy. Both of his parents died during the 1876 cholera epidemic after which he was brought up by his uncle Kanthappar Saravanamuttu. He had some basic education in his home village before being selected to attend the Aid Training School in Tellippalai in December 1881. There he converted to Christianity and took on the name Allen Abraham. He graduated from the school in December 1883 after which he joined Jaffna College's five year Graduation Course of the Institution. He graduated in 1888 with a first class. Abraham passed the Senior Local in 1886 and the Jaffna St. Patrick's College, Jaffna in 1889.

Abraham married Muthachi, daughter of Suppar Sankarapillai. They had two sons (Kanagasuntharam and Aruliah) and two daughters (Jane Nallamma and Rose Rasamma). Following the death of Muthachi Abraham married Ponniah Thaiyamuthu.

== Career ==
Whilst studying at Jaffna College Abraham was appointed an instructor by the college. After graduating from the college he was appointed lecturer at Tellippalai Training College. In 1891 he rejoined Jaffna College as a professor of Tamil.

Abraham passed the University of Jaffna's First Arts (FA) in 1893 (incorrect: Jaffna University formed in 1974) and later obtained an external BA degree in English, philosophy and mathematics from the university. (Jaffna University was formed in 1974, this is incorrect) He was appointed professor of mathematics by Jaffna College. At Jaffna College Abraham taught mathematics and astronomy for the University of Jaffna's FA and BA examinations. He resigned from the college when Rev. Brown, principal of the college, left in 1914. He re-joined the college when Rev. Bicknell was appointed principal.

Astronomy had been a hobby of Abraham's throughout his life. He wrote several articles on the subject for the Morning Star, Jaffna College Miscellany and the Royal Astronomical Society. He correctly calculated that Halley's Comet would be closest to the Earth on 19 May 1910 between 9am and 10am and that it would not hit the Earth as it would enter the orbit of Venus, retarding its path. (there is no evidence in these citations). He was elected fellow of the Royal Astronomical Society on 12 January 1912 for this work, having been proposed by proposed by A. V. Jugga Row in 1911. He was the first native Ceylonese to be made a fellow of the society.

Asides from astronomy, Abraham was interested in music, Tamil literature, agriculture and social work. Eight lyrics written by Abraham are still used as hymns by the Jaffna Diocese of the Church of South India. He was secretary of the Jaffna Council of the South United Church from 1915 till his death. He served as editor of the Morning Star from 1897 to 1909.

Abraham was admitted to hospital in June 1922 with an ulcer on a toe. He died on 9 July 1922.
