= John Welsh Dulles =

American Presbyterian minister (1823–1887)

John Welsh Dulles (November 4, 1823 – April 13, 1887) was an American Presbyterian minister and author. He was the grandfather of John Foster Dulles and Allen Welsh Dulles.

== Early life ==
Dulles was born in Philadelphia, Pennsylvania on November 4, 1823. He was the son of Joseph Heatly Dulles and Margaret (née Welsh) Dulles. He graduated from Yale College in 1844. After pursuing the study of medicine in the University of Pennsylvania in 1844 and 1845, he entered the Union Theological Seminary, New York City, in January 1846, and completed the course there in 1848.

== Career ==
On October 2, 1848, he was ordained by the Fourth Presbytery of Philadelphia, and eight days later sailed from Boston to Madras, South India, as a missionary of the American Board of Foreign Missions. He labored among the Hindus until compelled by loss of voice to return to America, reaching Boston in March 1853.

Unable to preach, though otherwise in good health, he entered, in November 1853, the service of the American Sunday School Union (of which his father was one of the founders), in Philadelphia, and labored for three years as its Secretary for Missions. In 1857 he took charge of the affairs of the Presbyterian Publication Committee, as its Secretary and the Editor of its publications. This organization was connected with the then "New School" branch of the Presbyterian Church, and was consolidated with the ("Old School") Board of Publication, on the re-union of the two branches of that church in 1870. He then became Editorial Secretary of the united Board, editing its books and periodicals, and continuing in this relation until the close of his life; he acted also for a year before his death as Corresponding Secretary.

Besides countless smaller publications he was the author of two books, Life in India, and The Ride through Palestine. The degree of Doctor of Divinity was conferred on him by the College of New Jersey in 1871. After some months of exhaustion, he was obliged to cease work in January 1887.

== Personal life ==
On September 20, 1848, he married Harriet Lathrop Winslow (1829–1861) in New York City. She was a daughter of the Rev. Miron Winslow, of Madras, and Harriet Wadsworth (née Lathrop) Winslow. Before her death on September 6, 1861, they were the parents of at least six sons and one daughter, including:

- John Welsh Dulles Jr. (1849–1946), a banker who married Elizabeth Lamar Russell, a daughter of Admiral Alexander Wilson Russell.
- Charles Winslow Dulles (1850–1921), a physician who married Mary Bateman.
- Perit Dulles (1852–1883), who married Julia Mallet Prevost, a daughter of Grayson Mallet-Prevost.
- Joseph Heatly Dulles III (1853–1937), a minister who reorganized and supervised the Library of the Princeton Theological Seminary.
- Allen Macy Dulles (1854–1930), a co-founder of the American Theological Society who married Edith Foster, a daughter of John W. Foster, Secretary of State under Benjamin Harrison.
- William Dulles (1857–1915), who married Sophia Perkins Rhea in 1891. After her death in 1907, he married Helen Rollins in 1910.

On February 2, 1865, he married Mary Nataline Baynard (1829–1876), of Philadelphia. Together, they were the parents of one daughter and one son:

- Nataline Baynard Dulles (1865–1895)
- Heatly Courtonne Dulles (1867–1956), chairman of the board of the investment banking firm Janney, Dulles & Co.; he married Lillian Hoyt Ewing.

Dulles died at his home in Philadelphia, on the 13th of April 1887, in his 64th year. His wife died in 1876. Of his six sons who survived him, three were graduates of Princeton College, and two were ministers.
