= Nathan Ward (missionary) =

American physician and missionary

Nathan Ward (November 21, 1804 – November 24, 1860) was a physician born in Plymouth, New Hampshire who worked as a religious and medical missionary in Jaffna, Ceylon (now Sri Lanka) from 1833 to 1846. Ward is most remembered for his work as the head physician of the Batticotta Seminary, where he served as a prominent educator and was influential in handling the cholera outbreak of 1846.

== Early life and education ==
Nathan Ward was born on November 21, 1804, in Plymouth, New Hampshire. His mother was Sarah Ward and his father was Samuel Ward. He received his primary and secondary schooling in his birth town. Later, he attended Bowdoin College Medical School, the "Medical School of Maine" and graduated in 1832. After schooling, he moved to live in Vermont, where he met his wife and later settled to have kids.

== Personal life ==
Ward married Hannah Ward on January 8, 1833. They met in Vermont, where Hannah was born. They lived in North Troy, Vermont for a couple of years before eventually settling in Burlington, Vermont. Nathan and Hannah Ward traveled to Ceylon together, where the eventually conceived and raised all of their children. In 1834, the Wards had their first child, William H. Ward. Later, they had their second son, Edward C. Ward and in 1842 they had Samuel R. Ward. At some point in between the births of William and Samuel, the Wards also had a baby girl who died before turning one.

== Missionary service ==
After graduating from medical school, Ward worked as a physician. After a couple of years, he tired of this work and decided to pursue a calling to work abroad. Hannah Ward's brother was a missionary of the American Board of Commissioners for Foreign Missions (A.B.C.F.M). He helped Ward get involved with the program and, ultimately, get sent on a mission to Ceylon. Luckily for Ward, his timing could not have been better. A new governor of Jaffna had just been elected who permitted the presence of American missionaries, while the previous governor had not. This resulted in a sudden increase in demand for missionaries, including Ward.

=== Journey ===
On June 30, 1833, Ward met the other voyagers that would be accompanying him on his journey to Ceylon, which included Reverend William Todd, Samuel Hutchins, Henry R. Hoisington, George H. Apthorp and their respective wives. The group received an embarkation ceremony in the Park-Street Church of Boston. Only July 1, 1833 they departed from Boston on a ship called the Israel. An audience of Bostonians accumulated to watch as a hymn was sung to grace the missionaries with good fortune on their journey. On October 28, 1833, the group arrived at the Jaffna Peninsula.

=== Service ===
Ward was only the second capable and qualified physician to be sent to the Batticotta Seminary and was, therefore, much needed and appreciated. The physician that was at the seminary before Ward was Dr. Scudder. After Ward arrived, he was able to open new stations in the peninsula and was eventually relocated to Madras in 1836. Scudder left Ward in charge of the seminary. He lived with other missionaries, Daniel Poor, Henry Woodward, James Read Eckard and their wives. At that point, Ward was the only American A.B.C.F.M physician in all of Jaffna.

Scudder commented on some of the benefits of having Ward at the Batticotta Seminary. He explained how Ward helped keep the hospital regulated, train students, and engage in new fields of research. As well as a physician, Ward was a teacher of Natural Philosophy and Medicine at the school. Additionally, he worked with and helped train a group of 8-10 native men in medicine by having them shadow him and help him with tasks in the hospital. He was observed to treat his men with respect by referring to them as “Dr.” in his letters.

The most notable and trying aspect of Ward's mission was the cholera outbreak of 1846. Before Ward's arrival, the natives did not understand how cholera is transmitted. They believed that simply being around a person with cholera would put someone at risk for getting the disease. In reality, the disease is transmitted through feces and often is common in places with poor sanitation. Ward helped educate the population while also providing medication. Many of the natives were opposed to taking medication, but Ward was able to treat around 900 patients and save around 600 people to give him a 60% success rate.

=== Return ===
After thirteen years of working in Ceylon under the A.B.C.F.M, the Wards finally returned to the states in the year 1846. Both Nathan and Hannah Ward had experienced deteriorations in their health and decided it was time to return to Vermont. For a time, Ward continued to work as a physician in Burlington, Vermont. Later in 1853, he decided to become a member of the clergy. He had been a member of the Browington Church for several years. Throughout his membership the Church had been lacking a pastor. Therefore, at the request of the Church, Ward obtained his preacher's license and later in 1855 was ordained as an evangelist.

== Death ==
After about a decade in Vermont, Ward was again overcome by the calling of overseas missionary work. His health had improved since he left and so on October 30, 1860, Nathan and Hannah Ward departed on their second journey from Boston to Ceylon. Unfortunately, Ward was never able to make it back to Ceylon. On November 24, 1860, Ward died of a heart attack at sea. In a letter written by Hannah Ward she states that he died peacefully in his sleep. Hannah Ward continued on to Jaffna despite her husband's passing and worked there for five years before returning home. She later died in 1884.
