= Capokolam =

UK charitable organization

Capokolam is a Charitable Incorporated Organization registered in the United Kingdom with the Charity Commission, operating since 2015 in the East, Central and North of Sri Lanka. The organization provides educational programs to marginalized children in all communities struggling from the aftermath of the Sri Lankan Civil War, the 2004 Asian tsunami and endemic socioeconomic issues in Sri Lanka. Part of their approach is to bring together local and international communities and volunteers, and fuse their cultural outlooks and artistry to rehabilitate children through the medium of Capoeira.

The organization works with orphans and schoolchildren from the orphanages and programs run by the Church of the American Ceylon Mission.
