= Union College, Tellippalai =

Union College
- ஐக்கிய கல்லூரி

Location
- Tellippalai, Jaffna District, Northern Province; Sri Lanka; 9°47′10.20″N 80°02′00.10″E

Information
- School type: Public Provincial 1AB
- Founded: 1816; 210 years ago
- Founder: Rev. Daniel Poor; Rev. Edward Warren
- School district: Valikamam Education Zone
- Authority: Northern Provincial Council
- School number: 1013003
- Principal: T. Varathan
- Teaching staff: 41
- Grades: 1–13
- Gender: Mixed
- Age range: 5–18

Union College (Tamil: ஐக்கிய கல்லூரி Aikkiya Kallūri; UC) is a provincial school in Tellippalai, Sri Lanka. Founded in 1816 by American Ceylon Mission, it is one of Sri Lanka's oldest schools.

== History ==
Rev. Samuel Newell, an American missionary of American Ceylon Mission from New England, USA, arrived in Jaffna peninsula on 7 September 1813 and occupied the Dutch Hall in the Town of Tellippalai. Later, American missionaries including Rev. Daniel Poor and Rev. Edward Warren joined Newell.

The American Ceylon Mission, founded in Jaffna District by the pioneer missionaries began establishing numerous Christian schools in the Jaffna peninsula in 1816. Their intention was to spread the Christian message among the Jaffna community.

Rev. Daniel Poor established the first school on 9 December 1816 in the town of Tellippalai, sixteen kilometers from the City of Jaffna. They taught English and western education among the community which initiated a revolution in the field of western education in Jaffna.

In 1818, the school was converted into 'Family Boarding School' with just six students. In 1821, there were only 11 boys and 3 girls. On June 30, 1823, Rev. Henry Woodward became the head of the school. All nine-girl students of the boarding School were transferred to the new Uduvil Girls' College. In 1825, the Boarding School was converted into a Preparatory School. Rev. Levi Spaulding, who succeeded Woodward in 1828, had to allow his brilliant students join Vaddukkoddai Seminary later known as Jaffna College. In 1820 Rev. Benjamin C. Megis, the head of school, founded a printing press. It was the first press that began printing Tamil publications in the entire world.

In 1869, Chellappah established a new school known as Chellappah English School in the same school campus. The American Ceylon Mission shifted to Vaddukkoddai Tamil Theological and Training School. to the Tellippalai school campus in 1871. The school became 'grant-in-aid school' in 1875 and earned Rs.300.00 annually from the government. After three years the Mission closed down the Tamil Theological department, added an Industrial Department to the school, and changed the school's name as Tamil Industrial and Training School.

In 1882 Sanders Hall was constructed with the money provided by former students and well-wishers. The Sanders hall had become the main building of the school consisted of a library, offices, student boarding and class rooms . The building was badly damaged during the Sri Lankan Civil War and currently being re-constructed.

The American Ceylon Mission took over Chellappah School in 1901 and named it American Mission English School. It became a Bilingual School in 1929. In 1939 the schools amalgamated as Tellippalai Union High School. In 1940 it got the current name Tellippalai Union College.

In 1961 the school became a government school.

From 12/12/1990, the school begins functioning at Ramanathan College as the Sri Lankan army moved into Tellippalai and the whole population from the area got displaced.

10/09/2002 The school started functioning at its original location of Tellippalai which was inside the high security zone.

In 2006 a new class room block was built as most of the buildings were damaged.

In 2011 high security zone at Tellippalai area was removed and the school started operating normally.

In 2016 the school is celebrating its 200th anniversary.

== Principals of Union College ==
Before 1939: Rev B. H. Rice, Rev. S. Veerakathy, S. M. Kandaihpillai, Taylor Thuraiappapillai, J. V. Chellappah, S. M. Veluppillai, G. A. Ratnavarathar, C. C. Kanapathippillai, S. K. Rasiah.

After 1939: I. P.Thurairatnam, K. Krishnapillai, T. Nadarajah, Kathir Balasundaram, N. Pushpanathan, N. Kandasamy, P. Kamalanathan, S. Punniyaseelan, and V. K. Radnakumar.

I. P. Thurairatnam's noteworthy accomplishments: introduced Senior School Certificate, London Matriculation, University Entrance and High School Certificate classes, inter-house system, Student Christian Movement, Old Boys' Association, Prize Giving, Scout Troop, Cricket and Football, and constructed Malaya Block, pipe-water supply, acquired Second Playground, renovated Biology and Physics laboratories, held Union Carnival and Exhibition and published The Union Pictorial. Union College became Grade I school in 1947.

T. Nadarajah reversed the decline of the school after the school was acquired by the government in 1961.

Novelist Kathir Balasundaram's noteworthy accomplishments: built a large Water Tank and an Open Air Theatre in a newly acquired piece of land, produced good G.C.E A/L results in the period 1986–1990 and constructed a Hindu Temple in 1986. Saturday Review in 1986 in its editorial declared him the best public school administrator in the Jaffna District.

K. Kandasamy successfully managed the school when it got displaced in 1990 due to the Sri Lankan Civil War.

S.Punniyaseelan brought the school back to normal operation after the Sri Lankan Civil War.

== Old Students Associations ==
- Union college Old Students Association, Jaffna
- Union college Old Students Association, Colombo
- Union college Old Students Association, Canada
- Union college Old Students Association, UK
- Union College Old Students Association, Sydney
- Union college Old Students Association, Melbourne
- Union college Old Students Association, Norway
- Union college Old Students Association, France

== Notable alumni ==
| Name | Year/degree | Notability | Reference |
|---|---|---|---|
| S. J. V. Chelvanayakam | | former leader Tamil United Liberation Front, Illankai Tamil Arasu Kachchi | |
| K. Kunaratnam | 1954 | vice chancellor University of Jaffna (1994–1997) | |
| Allen Abraham | 1883 | academic, astronomer (fellow – Royal Astronomical Society) | |
| P. N. Suganthan | 1986 | academic, Computer science, Nanyang Technological University, highly cited researcher in the world | |

== See also ==
- Category:People associated with Union College, Tellippalai
- List of schools in Northern Province, Sri Lanka
