= Tellippalai Hospital =

- Ministry of Health, Northern Province

Geography
- Location: Tellippalai, Jaffna District, Northern Province, Sri Lanka
- Coordinates: 9°46′28.60″N 80°01′51.70″E

Organisation
- Care system: Public

Services
- Emergency department: Yes
- Beds: 102

Links
- Lists: Hospitals in Sri Lanka

Tellippalai Hospital is a government hospital in Tellippalai, Sri Lanka. It is controlled by the provincial government in Jaffna. As of 2010 it had 102 beds. The hospital is sometimes called Tellippalai Base Hospital or Tellippalai District Hospital.

As well as general medical care the hospital provides a wide variety of healthcare services including diabetic, dentistry, family planning, obstetrics (ante-natal), oncology, paediatrics, psychiatry and tuberculosis. The hospital also has an emergency department, a physiotherapy unit and a pathological laboratory.

In 2010 the hospital had 7,201 in-patient admissions, 57,202 out-patient visits and 36,613 clinic visits.
