= Phineas R. Hunt =

American missionary printer (1816–1878)

Phineas Rice Hunt (1816-1878) was an American missionary printer to India and China, under the auspices of the American Board of Commissioners for Foreign Missions (ABCFM). He saw numerous works through his press in Tamil and Mandarin, including New and Old Testaments, a Dictionary of Tamil compiled by Miron Winslow, another dictionary of Tamil by G.U. Pope, Illustrations of Indian Ornithology by Thomas C. Jerdon (1847), and Illustrations of Indian Botany by Robert Wight (1850).

Hunt designed and developed improved Tamil type fonts some of which are still in use today. In 1865, John Murdoch, in his Classified Catalogue of Tamil Printed Books, wrote: "Tamil typography owes its present excellence mainly to Mr. P. R. Hunt, of the American Mission Press. With much labour, he superintended the cutting of the punches of several founts; the smallest size (brevier) he had prepared in America. Mr. Hunt has produced the smallest vernacular edition of the Scriptures ever yet issued in India. The American Mission Press has also raised the standard of printing throughout the Tamil country."

Phineas R. Hunt was the son of Ezekiel Hunt (1771–1849) and was born January 30, 1816, in Arlington, Vermont. At the age of 15 he was apprenticed in Bath, New York, in the printshop of Henry D. Smead, publisher of the Steuben Farmer's Advocate, where he learned the printing trade. While an apprentice in Smead's shop he came under the influence of his employer's young wife and converted to her evangelical faith.

In 1838 Miron Winslow in Madras, India came into possession of the printing presses formerly used there by the Church Mission Society, and through the ABCFM he put out a call for an American printer to come to India to take charge of the press. P.R. Hunt, then 23 years old, hearing of this appeal, wrote to the ABCFM in Boston volunteering to take the post, and was accepted. On July 26, 1839, he was married in Boston to Miss Abigail Nims of Bath, a 29-year-old schoolteacher who was the sister of his mentor Mrs. Smead. Four days later they embarked from Boston for Madras reaching there in March 1840. Hunt worked there for 27 years as director of the American Mission Press in Madras, while his wife Abigail kept open house at their home on Popham's Broadway for missionaries passing through Madras on their way to stations in India.

Despite the fact that Hunt was never fully conversant with the Tamil tongue and had to rely upon translators, he printed an improved edition of the Bible in Tamil, a Tamil grammar, and Winslow's dictionary of Tamil, as well as numerous Christian devotional works in English, Tamil and Telugu, such as The Bazaar Book, or Vernacular Preacher's Companion (1865). He also printed works of East Asian natural history including Robert Wight's Illustrations of Indian Botany (1841–1850) (second volume only, the first part having been printed earlier by J.B. Pharoah, Madras), the second volume of the imposing Spicilegium Neilgherrense (1851) and the last three volumes of Icones Plantarum Indiae Orientalis, printed for the author by Hunt and bound at the American Mission Press bindery; as well as Meteorological Observations made at the Honorable East India Company's Magnetical Observatory at Singapore (1850), by Captain Charles Morgan Elliott.

Hunt also served as treasurer of the American mission until its closure in 1866. Miron Winslow, the head of the mission for 30 years, had died in 1864, and in 1866 Hunt sold the press to the Society for Promoting Christian Knowledge for 40,000 rupees and closed out the affairs of the American Mission Press before sailing to America. After a short stay in the United States in 1867, he and his wife sailed back to Asia in 1868 to undertake similar work in China, where Hunt established what was said to be the first foreign press in Beijing as well as the first press there with movable metal type, in addition to supervising the production of a new translation of the Bible into Mandarin and also a Book of Common Prayer.

His work as a printer was appreciated by the Indian natives as well as the missionaries of different denominations and a gold watch and chain were presented with a letter of appreciation which read: "Every person who feels an interest in Tamil literature, in the well-being of the Tamil people, or in the progress of Christian enlightenment and civilization in a heathen land, must entertain a deep sense of the benefits which have been conferred upon the native community of Southern India, by the elegant editions of Tamil classical and grammatical works which have proceeded from your press, and which may be said to have raised printing to a place among the fine arts; and especially by your clear, correct, and beautiful editions of the Tamil Bible, — each edition excelling the previous one, — which have called forth the admiration and merited the gratitude of all native Christians."

Although trained only as a printer and having little or no command of the local languages either in India or in China, Hunt was able to produce an impressive stream of publications during 37 years by working closely with English-speaking residents in India and China, always expressing the hope that "God would allow some souls to be conquered before he [Hunt] should die."

He died in Beijing, China, of typhoid fever on May 30, 1878, a year after the death of his wife, and was buried next to her in the English cemetery in Beijing.
