= Ceylon Evangelical Lutheran Church =

Christian denomination in Sri Lanka

- Abbreviation: CELC
- Classification: Protestant
- Orientation: Lutheran
- Polity: Episcopal
- Associations: International Lutheran Council
- Region: Sri Lanka
- Branched from: Lutheran Church–Missouri Synod
- Congregations: 16
- Members: 5,000
- Pastors: 4
- Official website: celc.lk

The Ceylon Evangelical Lutheran Church (CELC) is a Lutheran body in Sri Lanka. The CELC was recognized as a partner church with the Lutheran Church – Missouri Synod (LCMS) in 2023. It is an associate member of the International Lutheran Council.

== History ==
In 1927, the Lutheran Church – Missouri Synod began missionary work in what was then known as Ceylon as an outgrowth of its work in India. The work was centered on the Tamil-speaking Hindus in the tea estate region of central Sri Lanka. In 1978, the churches were registered with the Sri Lankan government, and in 1998, the LCMS resident missionaries were withdrawn from the country. The name Lanka Lutheran Church was adopted in about the year 2000. In 2001, the Lanka Lutheran Church became a partner church of the LCMS and joined the International Lutheran Council. It also joined the Lutheran World Federation, reporting a membership of 1,200. The church lost its government registration in about 2007.

In 2013, LCMS missionaries returned and worked to revive the church body. In 2017. The missionaries obtained a registration under the name Ceylon Evangelical Lutheran Church. Most of the congregations, pastors (priests), and evangelists who had belonged to Lanka Lutheran Church joined the CELC

Christian in Sri Lanka (2012 census)
1. Catholic (81.94%)
2. Protestantism (10.63%)
3. Oriental Orthodox (5.21%)
4. Other Christianity (2.22%)

The first pastor ordained into the CELC was Rev. P. Gnanakumar, who had served as a vicar in the Lutheran church for more than a decade, and was ordained on 2 September 2017 by Rev. Charles Ferry, the LCMS regional director for Asia. On the same day, Rev. Dr. Edward Naumann, LCMS Theological Educator for South Asia, launched the church's official publishing house, the Ceylon Evangelical Lutheran Publishing House (CELPH).

In October 2017 all three pastors who had served in the Lanka Lutheran Church, Rev. Nadaraja, Rev. Arulchelvan, and Rev. Devanesanin, applied and were accepted for membership of the CELC Ministerium, bringing the total number of Sri Lankan pastors to four.

On 9 October 2022, the Ceylon Evangelical Lutheran Church (CELC) consecrated its first bishop, Rev. Arumanayagam Arulchelvan. The consecration was conducted by Archbishop Joseph Omolo of the Evangelical Lutheran Church in Kenya (ELCK), joined also by ELCK Bishops Kispin and Titus.

== Statistics ==
As of 2022, the CELC has 16 congregations. Most of the congregations are located in the Central Province, with one each in the Northern, Sabaragamuwa, Uva, and Western provinces.

The CELC is served by four pastors and five evangelists. Given that there are fewer pastors than congregations, the pastors attempt to visit each congregation at least once a month to administer Holy Communion.

== Relationship with other Lutheran bodies ==
The CELC is a member of the International Lutheran Council, but has no official relationship with the Lutheran World Federation. On 26 September 2018, the International Lutheran Council received the CELC as a full member, thus bringing international recognition to the CELC.

The Ceylon Evangelical Lutheran Church and the Lutheran Church – Missouri Synod recognize altar and pulpit fellowship with one another and are church partners.

== See also ==
- Christianity in Sri Lanka
