= Tamil Lexicon dictionary =

Tamil language dictionary

Tamil Lexicon (Tamil: தமிழ்ப் பேரகராதி Tamiḻ Pērakarāti) is a twelve-volume dictionary of the Tamil language. Published by the University of Madras, it is said to be the most comprehensive dictionary of the Tamil language to date. On the basis of several precursors, including Rottler's Tamil–English Dictionary, Winslow's Tamil–English Dictionary, and Pope's Compendious Tamil–English Dictionary, work on a more exhaustive dictionary began in January 1913 and the first forms were printed by the end of 1923. Initially estimated at ₹ 100,000, the total cost of the project came to about ₹ 410,000. The first edition had 4,351 pages in seven volumes, including a one-volume supplement, which were printed between 1924 and 1939 and had 104,405 words, with an additional 13,357 words in the supplementary volume, totaling to 124,405 words in all.

The dictionary was reprinted in 1956 and 1982. Work on the revised and expanded edition of the dictionary, being published in twelve volumes, began on 1 May 2003, with the first volume published in 2012 under the vice-chancellorship of K. Thiruvasagam. The revised edition of the dictionary will include words taken from secondary sources like modern and old literary works, newspapers, scientific journals and inscriptions.

== History ==
Although the origin of the Tamil language dates back to antiquity, the first regular lexicon of the language, with words arranged alphabetically, did not appear until the eighteenth century. Lexicons of the earlier period were not arranged alphabetically but metrically, on the basis of the first-letter rhyme, a characteristic of Tamil poetry. Agaraadhi Nigandu was the first alphabetically arranged lexicon published in 1594. Several dictionaries followed suit, including those by the foreign missionaries, such as Palporut Choolaamani, Podhigai Nigandu, Tamil–Portuguese Dictionary of Fr. Antem de Proenca, Dictionarium Tamulicum, Chathur Agaraadhi, Fabricius's Tamil–English Dictionary, Manual Dictionary of the Tamil Language (The Jaffna Dictionary), Oru Sor Pala Porul Vilakkam, Rottler's Tamil–English Dictionary, Winslow's Tamil–English Dictionary, Pope's Compendious Tamil–English Dictionary, Classical Tamil–English Dictionary, Tamil Pocket Dictionary, Tranquebar Dictionary, N. Kadhirvel Pillai's Dictionary, Sangam Dictionary, and Ilakkiya Sol Agaraadhi.

When the 67,542-words Winslow's Tamil–English Dictionary, which was sourced on the unpublished work of Rev. Joseph Night and Rev. Samuel Hutsings, was published in 1862 by the American Mission Press, it was considered the best lexicon available at that time. This dictionary by Miron Winslow was based on the works of Johann Rottler, which itself was inspired from Johann Fabricius's work in the mid-18th century. Winslow was sent out to Jaffna and then transferred to Madras by the American Board of Commissioners for Foreign Missions. In both the places, he collaborated with Arumuga Navalar. It had the most number of words of any Tamil dictionary up to the time. The copyright of the dictionary was held by the American Ceylon Mission.

Soon there was a demand to revise the Winslow dictionary. However, the mission suffered from lack of funds due to the closure of the Arbuthnot Bank. Citing lack of scholars in Ceylon (now Sri Lanka), it then sought the help of the Madras branch of the Christian Literature Society.

G. U. Pope, upon hearing of these plans, offered to give his collection of material for an exhaustive lexicon of the Tamil language. As he had retired to Oxford to work on the Tamil Classics, he suggested an editor be sent out to Oxford to work with him on the re-issue of Winslow's dictionary. The Government of Madras and the University of Madras reacted positively to Pope's suggestion. However, before any concrete decision could be taken, Pope died in 1907. In 1909, his son came to Madras with his father's papers and donated them to the Oriental Manuscripts Library, permitting the use of the material for any new Tamil dictionary. In 1910, J. S. Chandler of the American Mission, then residing in Kodaikanal, forwarded a proposal to the Madras government on the new Tamil dictionary project.

With the Pope's collection it had, the government reacted to Chandler's proposal in January 1911 by appointing a five-member Lexicon committee comprising a representative each from the government, the university, the Madras Tamil Sangam, and the missionary bodies of Ceylon and South India. Chandler, who was nominated by South Indian missionaries, was appointed chairman of the committee and was asked to work full-time as editor of the project.

Detailed discussions took place for the next couple of years, and the University of Madras was made supervisor of the project. The total cost of the project was estimated at ₹ 100,000 for a period of five years that the project was expected to take.

Work on the project began on 1 January 1919, with the appointment of three pundits, three clerks and two typists. The scholars included a Tamil pundit, a Sanskrit pundit and one familiar with the other Dravidian languages and Urdu. M. Raghava Iyengar of Ramnad, a Tamil scholar, assumed the leader of the team. Incidentally, the Tamil typewriter used for the project, with a keyboard developed by Yost of the American Mission, was the first to be ever used in an office in India.

When Chandler retired in 1922 at the age of 80, about 81,000 words had been compiled. Few more words were added soon, and in 1924 the Lexicon went to press. With the University of Madras holding the copyright, the printing of the work was entrusted to the Diocesan Press (now CLS Press), which had earlier printed the Winslow's dictionary as the American Mission Press.

In 1926, S. Vaiyapuri Pillai was appointed editor for the project. Further delays resulted in the final volume of the dictionary getting published only in 1936, with Pillai continuing as editor till the project was completed in 1939. In 1939, an additional 20,000 words collected for the Lexicon were published. In 1954, a concise version of the lexicon was published.

The dictionary was digitised in 2011.

== Editions ==
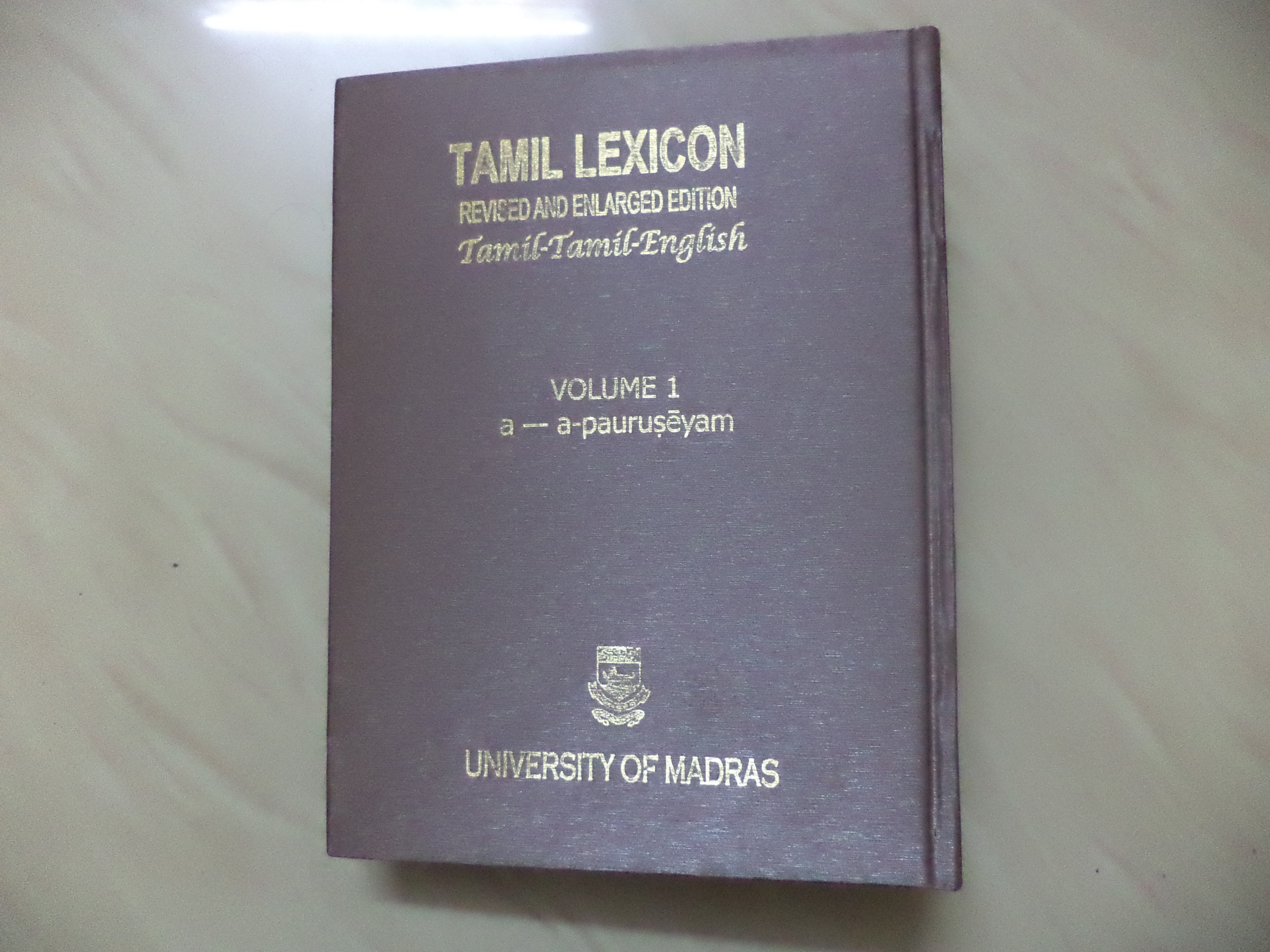
Back cover of the Tamil Lexicon dictionary

The first edition of the lexicon was published in 1924, with reprints in 1956 and 1982. In 2012, a revised and enlarged edition was published. The lexicon was digitized on 1 April 2011.

== Criticism ==
In addition to the delay in publishing, the first volume of the revised and enlarged edition published in 2012 was found to have numerous spelling mistakes, bloopers, and grammatical and typographical errors. A complaint was sent to the Chief Minister's Cell. V. Murugan, one of the members of the expert committee who subsequently resigned, sent a detailed note to the Madras University's Tamil department, listing the errors.

== See also ==
- University of Madras
- Tamil language
- List of dictionaries by number of words
