= Henry Richard Hoisington =

American missionary (1801-1858)

Henry Richard Hoisington (23 August 1801 – 16 May 1858) was an American missionary to Ceylon (present-day Sri Lanka) as part of the American Board of Commissioners for Foreign Missions. He was one of the first three missionaries who established mission station at Madura, commencing the American Madura Mission in South India as an offshoot of the Jaffna Mission in Ceylon, also known as the Ceylon Mission.

He translated The Oriental Astronomer: Being a Complete System of Hindu Astronomy.

== Biography ==
=== Early life ===
He was born on 23 August 1801 in Vergennes, Vermont. He was the son of Job and Sarah (Knapp) Hoisington. The family moved to Buffalo, New York, where Job was employed as a carpenter. When Henry was 12 years old, his father Job, a militia officer, was killed during a British attack on Black Rock in the War of 1812. His mother, Sarah, was left with seven children to raise. She became a charter member of the First Presbyterian Church of Buffalo, N.Y. Helped by his mother's influence, Henry experienced religion and joined the Presbyterian Church.

=== Training and early career ===
He first worked in a dry goods store, and then at age 15 began learning the printer's trade in Buffalo, later working as a printer in Utica and New York City. Here, stricken with typhus, he determined during his convalescence to become a preacher. He prepared himself for college at Bloomfield Academy in New Jersey, studying under Dr. Armstrong. He entered Williams College in Williamstown, Massachusetts in 1824 at the age of 23. He graduated is 1828, Phi Beta Kappa, and gave the Greek oration at graduation. From Williams College he went to Auburn Theological Seminary, in Auburn, New York, graduating in 1831. While at college and theological school he worked his way by printing and teaching school. On August 30, 1831, he was ordained by the Cayuga Presbytery at Aurora, New York.

From 1831 to 1833, he served as minister of the First Presbyterian Church of Scipio, (Aurora), Cayuga County, N.Y. On July 1, 1833, Henry and his wife Nancy Hoisington took ship on the vessel "Israel" for India and Ceylon, serving as missionary and printer for the American Board of Commissioners for Foreign Missions (ABCFM) mission in Jaffna, Ceylon (Sri Lanka).

Biographical editing is from A Hoisington Album, MS by Maida Barton Follini, great-great-great-granddaughter of H.R.Hoisington 1st.

=== Missionary work ===
In 1833, he was sent as a missionary to Ceylon, where he served until 1854. Upon arrival in Jaffna, he was initially stationed at Manipay in 1834. In July 1834, he along with Nathan Ward, Mr. & Mrs. William Todd, Samuel Hutchins, and George H. Apthorp were sent as first missionaries by ABCFM board missionaries of Ceylon Mission to commence missionary work at newly established mission station at Madura, first and central station of American Madura Mission. After establishing two native schools, he reverted to Jaffna to continue his missionary work there.

From 1835 to 1836, he served as an instructor in English in Batticotta Seminary, and its principal from 1836 to 1841. On furlough and due to ill-health, he returned to United States in 1841, and was back in Ceylon in 1844. He resumed his principalship till 1849, when due to ill health, he returned to the United States for good.

After having served as ABCFM agent for twenty-years until 1854, he held pastorates in Williamstown, Massachusetts, and Centerbrook, Connecticut. While preaching in the pupit at Centerbrook, he suffered a stroke, and died on 16 May 1858.

=== American Madura Mission ===
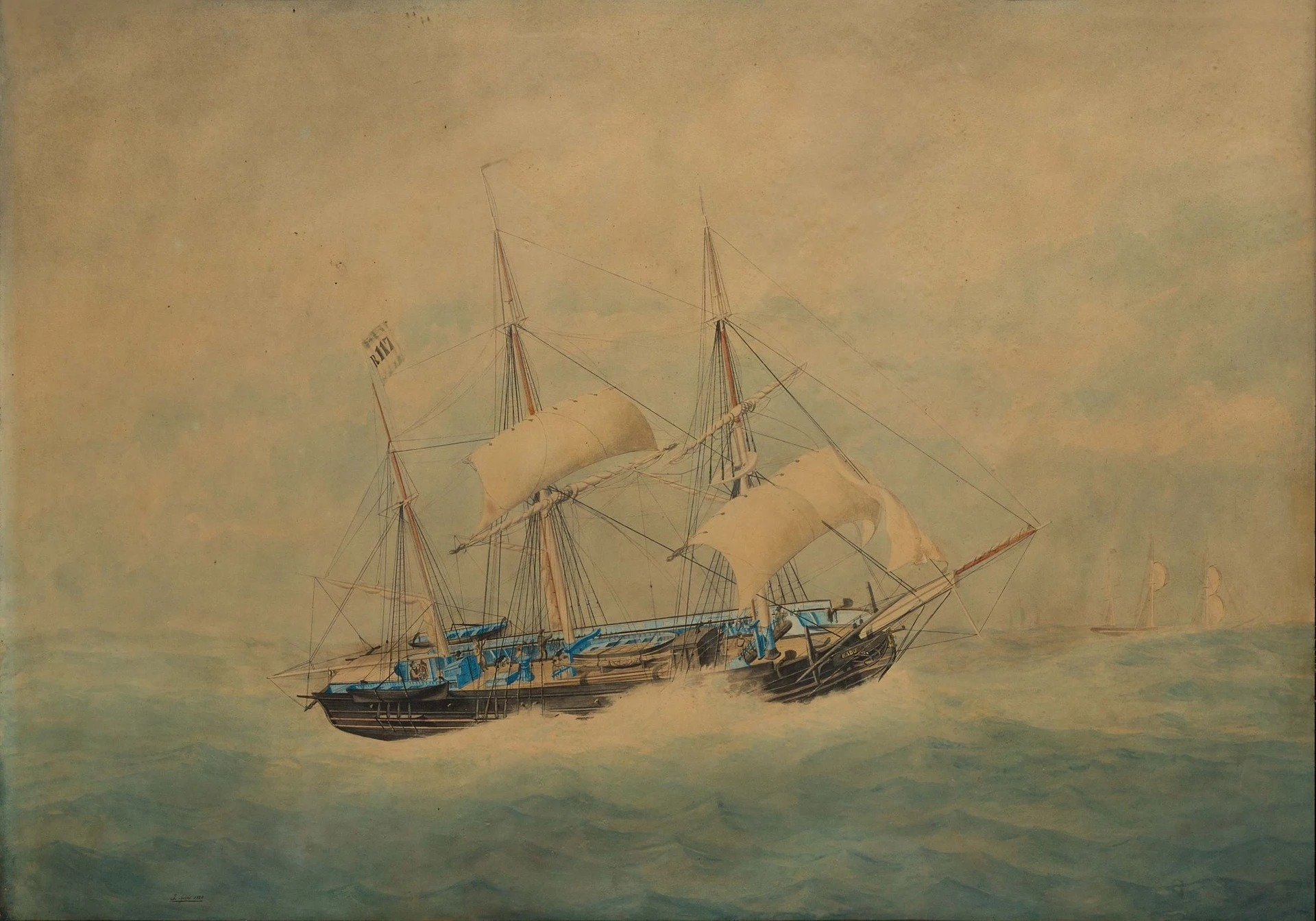
The Madura 1834, by Jacob Spin

Levi Spaulding, an American missionary of Ceylon Mission, visited Madura in January 1834 and selected it as the suitable mission site among the Tamil people of South India; thus, The American Madura Mission was founded as an offshoot of the Jaffna Mission or Ceylon Mission in 1834 on the initiative of missionaries of the board in Ceylon Mission. Both Ceylon Mission and Madura Mission were intimately associated, not only as connected with the same board, but also as labouring among peoples having the same language and religion. The agents of these missions exchanged spheres of labour, worked in the printing press of both missions, and collaborated to have a constant interchange of counsel.

The first missionaries [workers] to arrive on payroll of ABCFM were Henry Richards Hoisington and William Todd, including three native youths from the Ceylon Boarding School in July 1834; hence, Spaulding, Hoisington, and Todd were credited as first three missionaries to American Madura Mission. Hoisington returned after two months to Jaffna and was stationed at Batticotta, while Todd remained as missionary at Madura mission station. Before Hoisington departed, two schools were established, one for each sex. The first Church in Madura was organized in 1836, and the first convert was received into the church in July 1837. Later, new stations were expanded to Dindigal in 1835, Tirumangalam in 1838, Pasumalai in 1845, Periyakulam in 1848, Vattilagundu in 1857, Melur in 1857, and Palni in 1862.

Hoisington learned the Tamil language and became a scholar of Hindu philosophical and scientific knowledge. He published a number of books, including The Oriental Astronomer - A complete system of Hindu Astronomy (translation) (1848); Origin & Development of the Existing System of Religious Beliefs in India (1852); and Treatises on Hindu Philosophy (1854).

Initially, the mission policy was to spread Christianity among the natives through free schools with Hindus as teachers, and boarding-schools with Christian teachers - especially, Roman Catholics. Though reading, writing, and Arithmetic were imparted through schools, constant attention was paid to Christian catechisms and the scriptures with no place to heathen books. By 1845, the number of schools were drastically increased to produce 4000 scholars, exclusive of separate boarding schools for boys and girls. Later, policies were changed like abandoning English education for vernacular education and combination of medical aid to the natives with its evangelical work - for this, several of members were trained as medical men.

== Family life ==
Henry Hoisington married Nancy Lyman of Chester, Massachusetts, on September 21, 1831.

Henry Richard and Nancy Hoisington were survived by a son, Henry Richard Hoisington, 2nd (also a clergyman). They also three daughters, Sarah, Lucy, and Anna Maria.

A second son, Lyman, died of cholera in India, and a third son died of measles on the trip home.
