= Protestantism in Sri Lanka =

- Protestant Church Flag

Total population
- ▲290,967 (2012)

Regions with significant populations
- Province
- Western: ▲108,321
- North Western: ▼8,702
- Northern: ▲2,530
- Central: ▲29,867
- Eastern: ▲11,098

Religions
- Protestantism

Languages
- Sinhala; Tamil; English

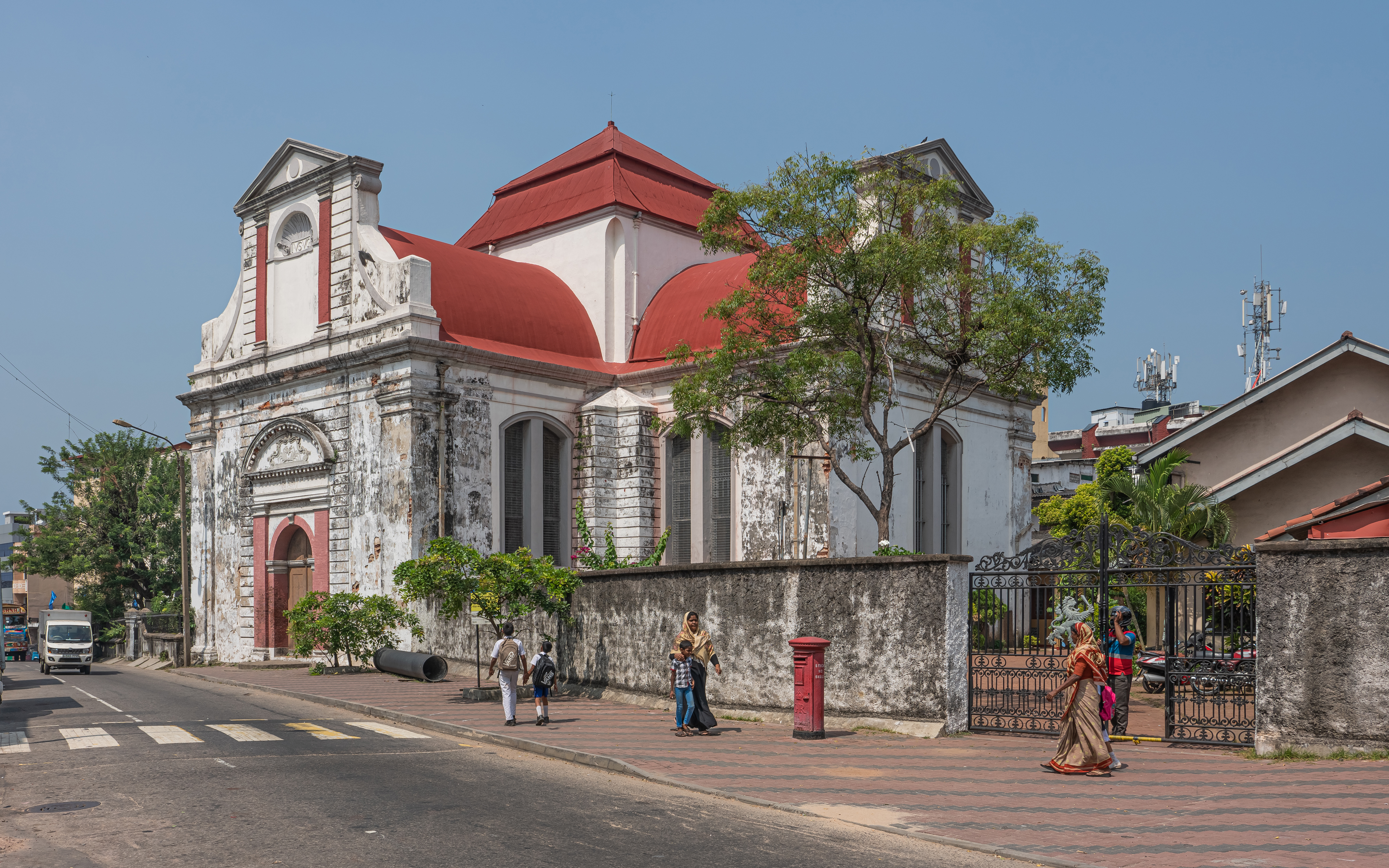
The Christian Reformed Church in Sri Lanka (formerly known as the Dutch Reformed Church in Sri Lanka), the oldest Protestant church on the island.

According to the 2012 census, 6% of the population of Sri Lanka was Christian; of these, one in ten was Protestant, showing that there were approximately six Protestants for every 1,000 Sri Lankans. Later estimates suggest that this share has doubled in less than ten years.

== History ==
Anglican and other Protestant missionaries arrived in Sri Lanka during the early 19th century, when the British took control of Sri Lanka from the Dutch. The oldest Protestant church in Sri Lanka is the Christian Reformed Church in Sri Lanka, formerly the Dutch Reformed Church in Sri Lanka, has over 30 congregations and more than 5,000 members.

In 1842 the Church of Scotland established St. Andrew's Church, Colombo and in 1845 opened a second church in Kandy. These two Scottish church communities forming the Presbytery of Ceylon. The Dutch Reformed Church subsequently joined the Presbytery of Ceylon however in 1952 doctrinal controversies occurred in the Dutch Reformed Church, which led to a split. The dissenting group forming the Presbyterian Church Colombo, with the Presbytery of Ceylon eventually folding. In 1954 the Presbyterian Church Colombo was joined by the Scots Kirk, Kandy to form the Presbytery of Lanka. The St. Andrew's Church, Colombo continues to operate as part of the Church of Scotland, under the jurisdiction of the International Presbytery.

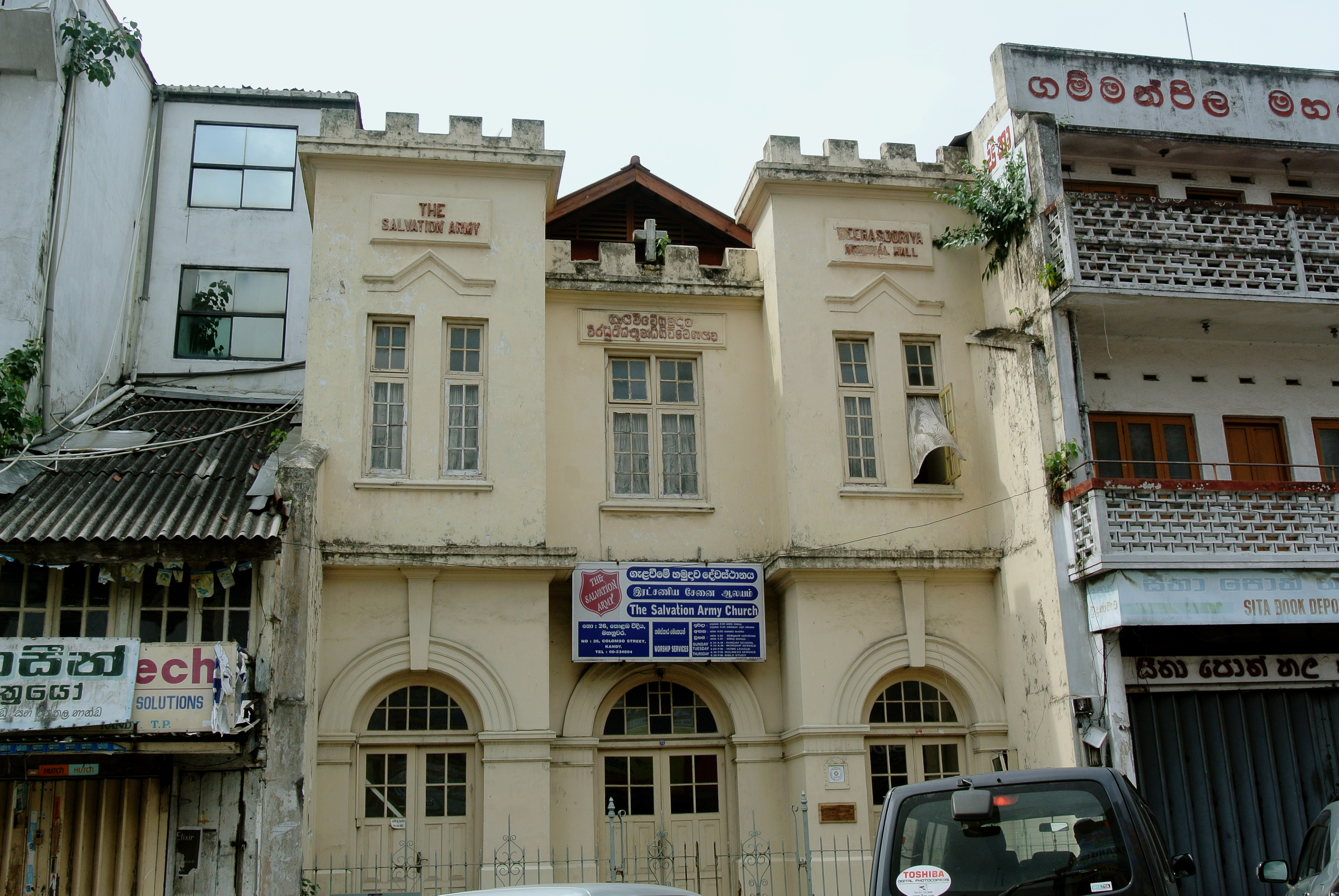
Salvation Army Church in Kandy.

The Salvation Army established themselves in Ceylon on 26 January 1883 under the leadership of Captain William Gladwin. He was joined in 1885 by Frederick Booth-Tucker (the son-in-law of William Booth, the Salvation Army's founder). In 1909 the Salvation Army established a territorial headquarters in Colombo. Up until 1920 Ceylon was administered as a sub-territory of South India. In 1921 it was granted full territorial status, with Colonel Millner appointed as its first territorial commander.

In the 1962 Ceylonese coup d'état attempt, A group of Christian officers in the military and police planned to topple the government of Prime Minister Sirimavo Bandaranaike during the night of 27 January 1962. The coup was allegedly in response to increased Buddhist presence in the military. Following the coup, the officer corps was purged of many Roman Catholics and Protestants, which made up the majority of the officers, at the time.

The Lanka Lutheran Church was founded in 1978 but went defunct in the mid-2000s. It was replaced in 2017 by the Ceylon Evangelical Lutheran Church (CELC). The CELC has fifteen congregations and an approximate membership of 2,000 parishioners.

== Freedom of religion ==
Article 9 of the Sri Lankan constitution states that Buddhism shall be accorded “foremost place” in the country, while article 10 still allows for every person to be entitled to freedom of thought, conscience and religion. In 2024, the country was scored 2 out of 4 for religious freedom by Freedom House. Religious minorities face challenges in registering their places of worship with the US Commission on International Religious Freedom (USCIRF) stating that religious minorities, including Christians, have reported harassment from local authorities for failing to register churches under conflicting guidelines from the Sri Lankan government. The Christian Evangelical Alliance of Sri Lanka reported that Christians in rural areas, particularly small Protestant denominations, are at greater risk of intimidation and violence.

== See also ==
- Christianity in Sri Lanka
- Freedom of religion in Sri Lanka

Congregations

- American Ceylon Mission
- Sri Lanka Baptist Sangamaya
- Lanka Lutheran Church
- Methodist Church in Sri Lanka
- Believers Eastern Church
- Church of Ceylon
- Ceylon Pentecostal Mission
- Church of South India, Jaffna Diocese
