= Batticotta Seminary =

Former educational institute in Vaddukodai, Sri Lanka

Coordinates: 9.7293°N 79.9479°E

The Batticotta Seminary was an educational institute founded by the American Board of Commissioners for Foreign Missions (ABCFM)'s American Ceylon Mission at Vaddukodai, in the Jaffna Peninsula north Sri Lanka in 1823. It was founded as part of the medical mission of John Scudder, Sr. and was subsequently led by Nathan Ward. In 1846 the mission experienced a significant cholera outbreak. Emerson Tennent judged the Batticotta Seminary equal in rank with many European universities. The late Sabapathy Kulendran, the first bishop of the Jaffna Diocese of the Church of South India (JDCSI) observed that the seminary brought about a tremendous upsurge the like of which has never been seen in the country before or after.

== Closure ==
It was closed in 1855 under the leadership of E. P. Hastings. The reason for such a decision being that it was not successful in the mission of its founding namely, conversion of Hindus to Christianity.

== Reopening ==
The seminary was reopened in 1871 by alumni as Jaffna College with EP Hastings as the first principal.
