= Vincent Hoisington =

Singaporean artist (1924–1972)

- Born: 1924; Singapore, Straits Settlements, British Empire
- Died: 24 June 1972 (aged 47–48); Singapore
- Education: St. Joseph's Institution, Singapore
- Spouse: Agnes Hoisington
- Children: 4 (Karen Hoisington, Henry Hoisington, 2 others)

Vincent M. Hoisington (1924 — 24 June 1972) was a Singaporean self-taught painter and sculptor. He was a pioneer in aluminium art in Singapore.

== Early life and education ==
Hoisington was born in Singapore in 1924. He was the son of teacher Henry Martyn Hoisington and educationist Hannah Sundram. He sold his first artwork when he was 11. He studied at St. Joseph's Institution. During the Japanese occupation of Singapore, he painted portraits and made technical drawings for the Japanese to support himself, and received piano lessons from his sister.

== Career ==
Following the end of the occupation, he began giving piano lessons. In the 1950s, Hoisington designed the decor and the window displays for the Robinsons and John Little department stores. He was also commissioned for paintings and sculptures. In 1964, he won $6,500 as well as the chance to install his mural in the Chartered Bank Building on Jalan Ampang in Kuala Lumpur in a mural competition. By then, his murals had been installed in the Singapore Polytechnic, the Merchant Seamen's Institute, the Redemptorist Chapel and the Union House of the University of Singapore. Two of Hoisingron's paintings was installed in the Raffles Hotel. A painting of his which depicts the Annunciation can be found in the Novena Church.

Hoisington was a pioneer of aluminium etching in Singapore. In 1972, he established an art gallery in his home.

In July 2019, ten of his works were featured in the "Vincent Hoisington: Painter, Decorator" exhibition, which was held by Arts Agenda, S.E.A..

== Personal life and death ==
Hoisington married Agnes, a schoolteacher. They had four children, including Karen and Henry, who also became artists. They lived on 27 Margoliouth Road.

He died of a heart attack on 24 June 1972.
