= Harriet Winslow =

American missionary

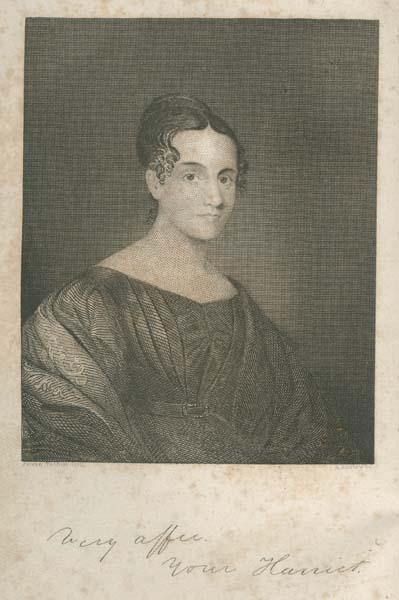
- Born: 1796
- Died: 1833 (aged 36–37)
- Occupation: Missionary

Harriet Wadsworth Winslow (née Lathrop; 1796–1833), born in Norwich, Connecticut, was a prominent missionary attached to American Board of Commissioners for Foreign Missions.

She was married at age 23 to fellow missionary Rev. Miron Winslow. They were both deputed to Ceylon, now Sri Lanka, as part of the American Ceylon Mission. She is the great-grandmother of Allen Dulles, the first civilian Director of Central Intelligence (DCI), and its longest serving director.

In January 1833 she died suddenly in childbirth. Her sister, Elizabeth Coit Lathrop Hutchings, sailed to join the Ceylon mission in July before word of the death had reached the United States. Harriet was buried beside two other sisters, both missionaries, Charlotte H. Cherry and Harriet Joanna Perry. Miron Winslow was widowed three more times before his last marriage in 1856.

She founded Asia’s first all-girls boarding school in Uduvil, Jaffna called Uduvil Girls' College. It was called Missionary Seminary and Female Central School.
