= American Ceylon Mission =

Religious mission to Jaffna, Sri Lanka

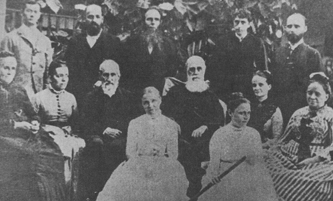
A group of ACM missionaries in Jaffna (circa 1890)

The American Ceylon Mission (ACM) to Jaffna, Sri Lanka started with the arrival in 1813 of missionaries sponsored by the American Board of Commissioners for Foreign Missions (ABCFM). Although they had originally planned to work in Galle, the British colonial office in Ceylon restricted the Americans to out-of-the-way Jaffna due to the security concerns of the British who were warring with France at the time. The critical period of the impact of the missionaries was from the 1820s to early 20th century. During this time, they engaged in original translations from English to Tamil, printing, and publishing, establishing primary, secondary and tertiary educational institutions and providing health care for residents of the Jaffna Peninsula. These activities resulted in many social changes amongst Sri Lankan Tamils that survive even today. They also led to the attainment of a lopsided literacy level among residents in the relatively small peninsula that is cited by scholars as one of the primary factors contributing to the recently ended civil war. Many notable educational and health institutions within the Jaffna Peninsula owe their origins to the missionary activists from America. Missionaries also courted controversy by publishing negative information about local religious practices and rituals.

== Background information ==
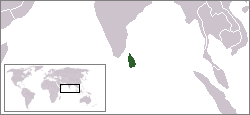
Location of Sri Lanka, a small island nation, in the Indian Ocean

The minority Sri Lankan Tamil-dominated Jaffna Peninsula ruled by the Jaffna Kingdom, which is hardly 15 by 40 mi (24 by 64 km), came under the direct jurisdiction of colonial power from Europe after the 1591 demise of Puviraja Pandaram, a local king, at the hands of the Portuguese. He had led a rebellion against Portuguese influence and was defeated. After establishing their rule through kings who were nominally Catholic, the Portuguese encouraged and coerced conversion of the locals to the Catholic faith. After the defeat and death of the last king Cankili II in 1619, most prominent Hindu temples were razed to the ground and restrictions on observance of native religious rituals were instituted.

The Portuguese were ousted by the Dutch East India Company in 1658. During the Dutch colonial period the popular Nallur Kandaswamy temple was rebuilt during the 1750s. This was also a period of revival of local literary activity. Local laws such as Thesavalamai were codified during this period, and the history of the previous Jaffna Kingdom under the name of Yalpana Vaipava Malai was put to print. The Dutch were replaced by the British in 1796. Although the British did not officially espouse any policy regarding religious conversions, they encouraged missionary activities in the Maritime Provinces except in the interior erstwhile Kandyan kingdom, where they had agreed to maintain the local Buddhist religion as part of the 1815 takeover of the kingdom.

For geopolitical reasons, the British saw fit to restrict the American missionaries to the Jaffna Peninsula. There were many denominations present such as the Methodist, Presbyterians, and Episcopalians whereas the British missionaries of the Methodist, Baptist and Anglican sects were present in the rest of the island. Even when this restriction was removed, the initial divisions between North Ceylon and South Ceylon missions were maintained.(see Wesleyan Methodist Mission, North Ceylon) By the early 19th century there were nine mission stations within the small peninsula.

== The American involvement ==
Rev. Samuel Newell (died March 30, 1841), founder of the ACM in Jaffna

The seeds for the American involvement in Jaffna were laid by The Rev. Samuel Newell in 1813. He and his wife Harriet Newell were sent out by the American Board of Commissioners for Foreign Mission in India in 1813. As it was just after the Anglo-American war of 1812, the suspicious British authorities in Calcutta asked them to leave. The Newells were then asked to go to Mauritius but Samuel Newell lost his only child and wife in Mauritius. From there he left for British-held Ceylon, now known as Sri Lanka. He landed in Galle and ended up in Jaffna city. Although he spent most of his career in India, particularly Bombay he was instrumental in starting up the American missionary involvement in Jaffna. He was followed by other missionary families such as Rev. Edward Warren, who arrived in July 1816. He took special interest in educating the people of the area in both English and their native Tamil language. He started the first American missionary school in Tellipalai in 1816. By 1848, 105 Tamil schools and sixteen English schools were founded. Mission centers were soon opened in nine locations.

Other New Englanders also took important steps to provide educational opportunities for women. Harriet Winslow, a great-great-grandmother of the late Secretary of State John Foster Dulles, founded the Uduvil Girls' School in 1824, the first Girls’ boarding school in Asia.Eliza Agnew from Pennsylvania was a teacher there for 42 years. Missionaries also made efforts to provide collegiate level education by founding the Batticota Seminary at Vaddukoddai in 1823 with Rev. Dr. Daniel Poor as its first principal.

The American Mission started the first printing press in Jaffna in 1820 and, in 1841, the island's second oldest newspaper.– Morning Star – and the first Tamil-language newspaper, Utayatarakai. In 1862, Rev. Miron Winslow published a Comprehensive Tamil-English Dictionary.

ACM also provided medical missionaries starting in 1820. The first medical center was managed by Dr. John Scudder. He founded what is considered to be the first Western Medical Mission in Asia at Panditeripo in Jaffna District. He served there for nineteen years in the dual capacity of clergyman and physician. His most important service was the establishment of a large hospital, of which he was physician in chief. He was especially successful in the treatment of cholera and yellow fever. He also founded several native schools and churches. He and his wife Harriet had 6 surviving sons and 2 daughters who all became medical missionaries and worked in South India. Dr. Scudder was followed by Dr. Nathan Ward in 1836, who was replaced in 1846 by Dr. Samuel Fisk Green, who began a thirty-year medical practice and training program. By the 1850s, he had translated more than 1,000 pages of medical texts into Tamil. He founded in Manipai what later became Green Memorial Hospital. This fledgling hospital was also used to train more than 60 locals in western medicine as fully fledged doctors. Of the first batch of 10 students only two by the name of Evarts and Ira Gould passed successfully. It was Sri Lanka’s first medical school as well as the only school until the present day to teach medicine in a local language.

== The Batticotta experience ==
The relatively small (15 × 40 miles) Jaffna Peninsula in pink with adjoining islands, as compared to rest of Sri Lanka

Batticotta Seminary was founded as a seminary for the best students from all other seminaries across the peninsula. It was intended to provide a tertiary level education equivalent a College in New England. The pioneering missionary at the Batticotta Seminary was Rev. Dr. Daniel Poor. Under him the American congregational missionaries became the pioneers of formal English and Tamil education in northern Sri Lanka. Although the initial aim was to convert Hindus to Christianity, it came to impart Biblical, English and European sciences on par with New England community colleges.

The seminary undertook to research and published pioneering books in the Tamil language in local literature, logic, algebra, astronomy and general science. One of the prominent alumni was C. W. Thamotharampillai, who was also the first graduate (1857) of the University of Madras in India.

Sir Emerson Tennent judged the Batticotta Seminary equal in rank with many a European university. The late Rev. Dr. Sabapathy Kulendran, the first bishop of the Jaffna Diocese of the Church of South India (JDCSI) observed that the "seminary brought about a tremendous upsurge the like of which has never been seen in the country before or after." Eventually, due to financial reasons, the seminary began to collect an entrance fee; thus, only wealthy families were able to send their children for education. The primary purpose of these families was to assure that their children received a European standard education without converting to Christianity. Thus, a missionary by the name of Rufus Anderson decided that the seminary should be shut down and it was closed in 1855. This led to a seventeen-year struggle by local Christians to reopen the seminary. It eventually opened as Jaffna College. Although American involvement continues to the current day in missionary activities, the critical age of transformation ended with the turn of the 20th century.

== Social impact ==
Although the missionaries came primarily to convert the locals, in the process they bequeathed all the modern intellectual necessities for a nation. According to N. Sabaratnam a prominent editor of Eelanadu newspaper,

"At the dawn of the 19th century the American Missionaries came to Jaffna to preach Christian Gospel, but in actual fact they propagated the ideals of a new nation, pulsating with life"

With the amalgamation of North Ceylon Missions into the Church of South India (CSI), most properties and existing educational institutions are managed by the CSI.

Their intrusion into Jaffna also had other unintended consequences. The concentration of efficient Protestant mission schools in Jaffna produced a revival movement among local Hindus led by Arumuga Navalar, who responded by building many more schools within the Jaffna peninsula. Local Catholics too started their own schools as a countermeasure. The state also had its share of primary and secondary schools. Thus saturated with educational opportunities, many Tamils became literate. This was used by the British colonial government to hire Tamils as government servants in British-held Ceylon, India, Malaysia and Singapore.

By 1956, 50% of clerical jobs were held by Tamils, although they were a minority of the country's population. Sinhalese leaders saw this imbalance as a problem that needed rectifying, and introduced discriminatory laws such as the 1956 Sinhala Only Act and the policy of standardization. These measures deteriorated the already frail political relationship between the communities and many experts believe it as one of the main causes of the Sri Lankan Civil War.

=== Controversy ===
The primary responsibility of the missionaries was to convert as many people as possible. They used education and medical missionary work to assist them. But they also published ridiculing and insulting material on native religion and practices. The popular deity Murugan was specifically targeted. This started the backlash against Christian missionaries. Many early converts like C. W. Thamotharampillai and Carol Visvanathapillai came back to Hinduism. This also resulted in formation of many Hindu Schools and more political awareness for native Tamils. Today around 10% are Christians with Catholics forming 90% of the Christians in Sri Lanka.

== See also ==
- Diocese of Jaffna
- Protestants in Sri Lanka
