= Miron Winslow =

American missionary

The Reverend Miron Winslow
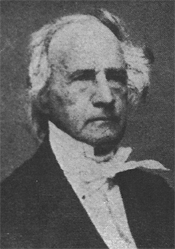
- Born: December 11, 1789; Williston, Vermont Republic
- Died: October 22, 1864 (aged 74)
- Education: Middlebury College
- Alma mater: Andover Theological Seminary
- Occupation: Christian missionary
- Years active: 1819-1864
- Notable work: A Comprehensive Tamil and English Dictionary of High and Low Tamil (1862); A History of Missions (1819)
- Spouse: Harriet Winslow (m. 1819)
- Relatives: John Welsh Dulles (son-in-law); John Foster Dulles (great-grandchild); Allen Welsh Dulles (great-grandchild); Dulles family

Miron Winslow (11 December 1789 – 22 October 1864) was an American Board of Commissioners for Foreign Missions missionary to the American Ceylon Mission, Ceylon (now Sri Lanka), where he established a mission at Oodooville and founded a seminary. He founded a mission station at Madras, the first and chief station of the American Madras Mission. Harriet Winslow, his wife, also served as a missionary alongside and wrote a memoir thereof.

He published several books, notably, A History of Missions and A Comprehensive Tamil and English Dictionary of High and Low Tamil, a Tamil to English lexicon which took twenty years of missionary labor to compile sixty-seven thousand Tamil words. This dictionary was based in part on manuscript material of the pastor Joseph Knight, of the London Missionary Society, and the Rev. Samuel Hutchings, of the American mission, and was the most complete dictionary of a modern Indian language published at that time. The book later become the basis for the more exhaustive Tamil Lexicon dictionary published by the University of Madras in 1924.

John Foster Dulles, the US Secretary of State (1953-1959), and Allen Welsh Dulles, Director of the CIA (1953-1961), were his great-grandchildren through his daughter Harriet Lathrop Winslow and her husband John Welsh Dulles.

== Biography ==
=== Early life ===
He was born in Williston, Vermont, on December 11, 1789, to Anna Kellogg and Nathaniel Winslow. At the age of fourteen, he began his career as a store clerk and later established himself in business in Norwich, Connecticut, where he was employed for two years.

With conversion, he had a conviction that he had to preach the gospel, and to preach un-evangelized nations; therefore, changed career paths, and gave himself to the service of Christ among the heathen. Later, he graduated from Middlebury College in 1815 and Andover Theological Seminary in 1818. On January 19, 1819, he married Harriet W. Lathrop, who bore him six children.

During his vacation years at Andover Theological Seminary, he worked as an agent of the American Board of Commissioners for Foreign Missions (ABCFM) to tour New England and raise funds. On November 4, 1818, he was ordained by ABCFM at Tabernacle Church, Salem, Massachusetts, together with Pliny Fisk and others. He was sent as a missionary to Ceylon Mission, Ceylon.

=== Missionary work ===
On June 8, 1819, he embarked from Boston on the brig Indus, bound for Calcutta, India. From Calcutta, he proceeded to Ceylon and reached his destination on December 14, 1819. As part of his missionary duty, he was initially stationed at Oodooville on July 4, 1820. At Oodooville, he established a mission and a seminary. After having laboured for fourteen years at Oodooville, he was transferred to Madras, South India. Having arrived at Madras on August 18, 1836, he had chosen that as the mission site for the American Madras Mission and started his missionary activities; consequently, Winslow is credited with commencing [founding] the American Madras Mission in 1836. In September 1836, he was joined by John Scudder, Sr., the first American medical missionary in India. In 1839 they were joined by the young missionary printer Phineas R. Hunt who sailed from America to take charge of the mission press.

Winslow visited America in 1855 but returned in 1858. Due to ill health, he left again to America in August 1864; however, he died at the age of seventy-four, on his way from India to America at the Cape of Good Hope (Cape Town), South Africa, on 22 October 1864, two days after he reached Cape Town.

== Bibliography ==
During his senior years at the seminary at Andover, he wrote A History of Missions or History of the principal attempt to propagate Christianity among the Heathen, and it was published by Flagg and Gould at Andover in 1819. During his passage from India to America in 1855, he wrote Hints on Missions which had been published by M.W. Dodd in 1856. It is a sort of digest of his experiences and observations during his thirty-seven years of missionary life.

In addition to these, he published several of his sermons and addresses as pamphlets. Most of his missionary labors were consumed in translating the Bible into the Tamil language in 1855, especially in the preparation of a Tamil-English lexicon entitled A Comprehensive Tamil and English Dictionary of High and Low Tamil, completed in 1862. Winslow devoted almost three to four hours a day for nearly thirty years to this project. It extends to nearly a thousand quarto pages and contains more than sixty-seven thousand Tamil words. This dictionary has thirty thousand five hundred and fifty-one (31,551) more words than any other dictionary of the Tamil language. The dictionary was so comprehensive, that it included the astronomical, mythological, astrological, scientific, botanical, and official terms, along with names of gods, authors, and heroes - for this, he received the highest encomiums from the Indian and English press like the Madras Observer; the Madras Times; the Colombo Observer-Statesman; the New York Observer; and more, and also from the literary and official press too.

== Publications ==
- A Sketch of Missions: Or, History of the Principal Attempts to Propagate Christianity among the Heathen (1819)
- Memoir of Mrs Harriet L. Windslow (1840)
- Hints of Missions to India (1856)
- Winslow’s English-Tamil Dictionary (with Winslow Knight and C. Appaswamy Pillai)

== See also ==
- Phineas Rice Hunt - editor of Winslow's works in India
