= Mahajana College, Tellippalai =

Mahajana College
- மகாஜனாக் கல்லூரி தேசிய பாடசாலை

Location
- Tellippalai, Jaffna District, Northern Province; Sri Lanka
- Coordinates: 9°47′11″N 80°01′21″E

Information
- School type: Public provincial 1AB
- Motto: Know Thyself
- Founded: October 1910
- Founder: T. A. Thuraiyappapillai
- School district: Valikamam Education Zone
- Authority: Northern Provincial Council
- School number: 1013001
- Teaching staff: 65
- Grades: 1-13
- Gender: Mixed
- Age range: 5-18

Mahajana College (Tamil: மகாஜனாக் கல்லூரி Makājaṉāk Kallūri) is a provincial school in Tellippalai, Sri Lanka.

== History ==
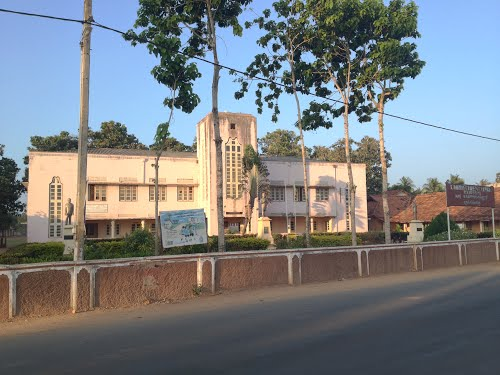
Mahajana college

The school was founded in October 1910 by scholar and poet T. A. Thuraiyappapillai.

Mahajana English High School is founded by Pavalar T. A. Thuraiappahpillai in 1910.

1949 - Raised to Grade I school

1961 - College is raised to Super Grade status.

1962 - The college is vested in the Crown as from 1 February and becomes a Government Institution for all intents and purposes.

1976 - Mr. P. Kanagasabapathy becomes the Principanl

1976 Oct - Former Principal Mr. T.T. Jeyaratnam passes away.

1990 - Mahajana temporarily moves to Alaveddy Arunothaya College.

and later moves to Pandatharippu Girls College next year.

On September 15, 1999, Mahajana College moved back to the original location at Ambanai.

== See also ==
- Category:Alumni of Mahajana College, Tellippalai
- List of schools in Northern Province, Sri Lanka
