= Daniel Poor =

Daniel Poor (27 June 1789 – 3 February 1855) was an American Presbyterian missionary and educator, and the founder of the first English School in Jaffna, Sri Lanka.

Poor was born in Danvers, Massachusetts, United States. He graduated at Phillips Academy, Andover in 1805 and Dartmouth in 1811, and at Andover Theological Seminary in 1814 at the age of twenty-five. He was ordained in the Presbyterian Church at Newburyport, Massachusetts in June 1815.

He married Susan Bulfinch of Salem, Massachusetts on October 9, 1815 and two weeks after their wedding left for Ceylon on October 23, 1815. He visited with Rev. William Bentley of Salem, a great linguist, who was not impressed with Poor's intentions or abilities. The Poors were accompanied by two more missionary couples James Richards and his wife, as well as Benjamin C. Meigs and his wife and a young bachelor clergyman named Edward Warren. They arrived in Colombo on March 22, 1816 and moved to the Jaffna Peninsula thereafter. The Poors and Edward Warren settled in Tellippalai on 16 October 1816.

Poor pioneered the English education service to Tellippalai and its adjoining villages. He was said to demonstrate generosity and for that reason his actions are a part of the local history where his efforts through education are remembered to this day by folks of the region who gained an advantage of high-standard education over the other rural areas of the Jaffna peninsula in the 19th century.

Though the American missionaries came with dedication and fanaticism to spread Christianity, they did not confine themselves strictly and fully to evangelism alone; they were keen to impart a liberal education. Immediately after landing in Colombo in 1813 Rev. Samuel Newell got a charter from the British governor to impart a primary education service to the public in the parched north. They were forbidden to engage in higher education. But, in contrast to the American missionaries, the Methodist missionaries, stationed in the Jaffna fort, took about four years to comprehend that they could not convert natives to Christianity without schools and in 1817 Rev. James Lynch applied for permission to their Head Office in England to establish schools. But Poor was able to commence his education service at Tellippalai without any impediment in 1816.

On 9 December 1816, Poor founded the 'Common Free School' which is currently known as Union College, Tellippalai in the 'Dutch Hall' that had been infested with poisonous serpents when Rev. Samuel Newel stepped into the compound in 1813. 'The Common Free School' was the first English school founded in Jaffna. In 1818 Poor converted the school into 'Family Boarding School' again the first of its kind to Jaffna. The school started with six students. The first student Samuel Lochester completed his studies in 1828 and got an appointment as a teacher in the same school. Also, Poor was the first principal to admit girls and dalith students to a school. Among the five girls first admitted to the school, one Miranda Sellathurai was from the dalith class. In 1821 the total number on roll was 11 boys and 3 girls.

Poor began to preach through an interpreter, but his progress in Tamil was so rapid that he spoke the language freely in less than a year. His wife Susan died at Tellippalai on May 7, 1821, after giving birth to one son and two daughters. Of the other three missionary colleagues, Edward Warren who was of fragile health, died in South Africa after leaving Colombo in April 1818. While at Tellippalai, he treated sick people and taught not only English but also the Tamil language to the natives. James Richard, who accompanied Warren to Cape Town, remained there until Nov.25, 1818 and returned to Jaffna. He survived for three more years, and died on August 3, 1822.

Poor then married Ann Knight of England, on January 21, 1823. Poor moved to Vaddukoddai where he founded a boarding school for boys. This school became an important educational centre for the entire region, and succeeded in sending out well-trained teachers and Bishops to schools and churches which is currently known as Jaffna College. He was given the degree of D. D. by Dartmouth in 1835. He was transferred to Madurai, India in 1836, where he founded thirty-seven schools that he visited in succession, and frequently addressed from horse-back to crowds of adult natives. He returned to his original station at Tellippalai in 1841. In 1848 he visited the United States where he created a profound impression with his able and eloquent advocacy of the cause of missions.

Poor returned to Jaffna again in 1850 and continued his work at Manipay. He died there in 1855 of cholera, amid a devastating epidemic of the disease.

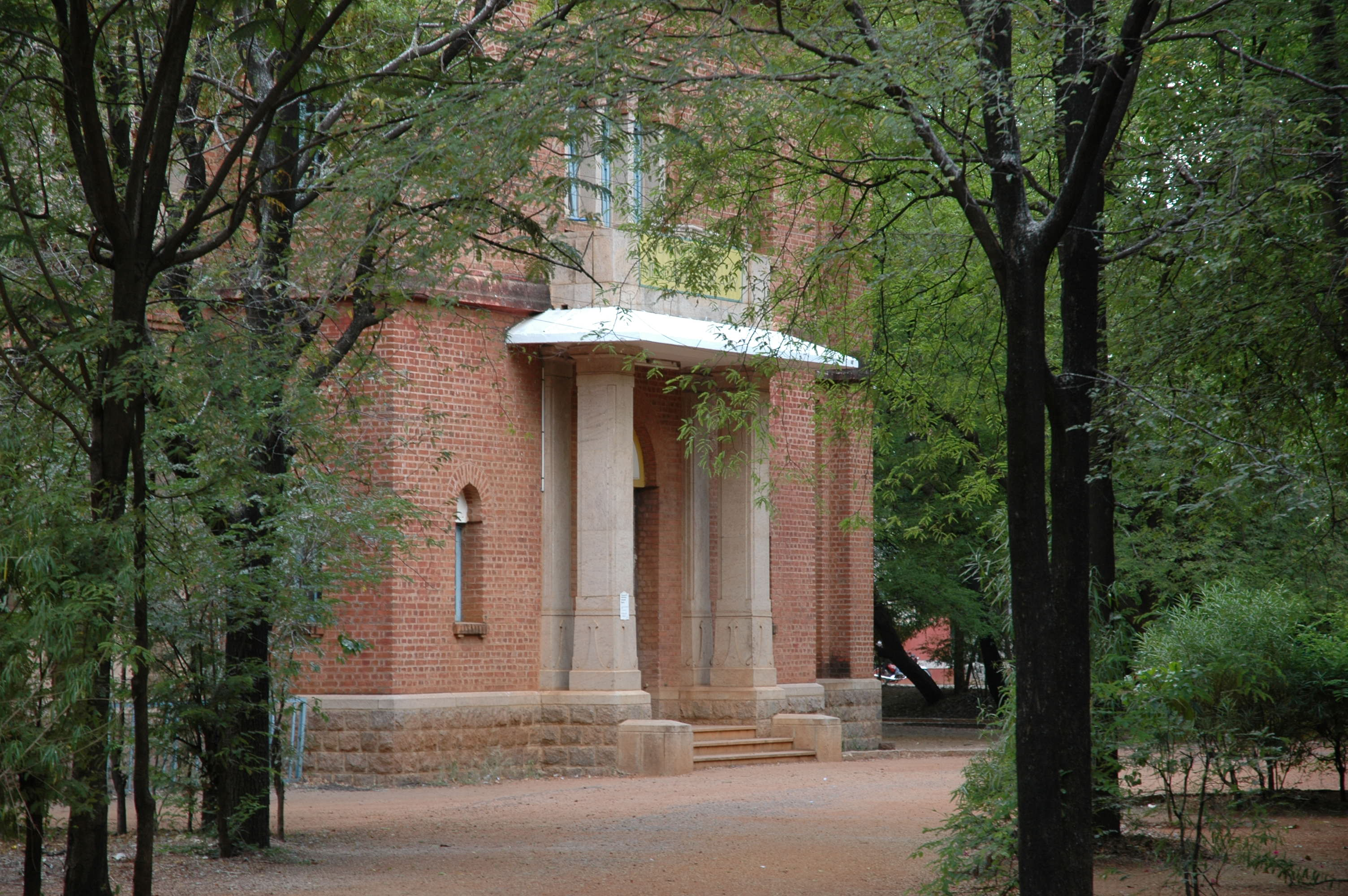
Daniel Poor Memorial Library, Madurai

Poor had performed a noble service to Tellippalai in the fields of English education, the Tamil language and social advancement. Daniel Poor Memorial Library in Madurai is the central library of The American College in Madurai. It is one of the oldest libraries present in South India. The library opened on June 28, 1915.
