= Tellippalai =

Tellippalai தெல்லிப்பழை
- Town
- Location within Northern Province
- Coordinates: 9°47′0″N 80°2′0″E
- Country: Sri Lanka
- Province: Northern
- District: Jaffna
- DS Division: Valikamam North

Tellippalai or Thellippalai (Tamil: தெல்லிப்பழை Tellippaḻai) also known as Tillypalli (தில்லைப்பள்ளி) is a small town in the northern Jaffna District of Sri Lanka. It is located about 15 kilometers north of Jaffna town along the Kankesanthurai road

In the middle part of 20th century Tellippallai town had become an administrative and commercial hub for the surrounding villages of Ampanai, Kollangkaladdi, Veemankamam, Varuthalaivilan and Mathanai. Tellippalai railway station is located at about 100 meters east of Tellippalai junction.

== Legend ==
An Indian princess from Tamil Nadu Maaruthap Piravaakavalli or Maruthapura Veeravalli got cured of her disease at Keerimalai springs Naguleswaram temple and settle down at Tellippalai for some time. Because of this the place was named as thallipalli. Thalli means young and palli means small village. Over the time the name became Thellipalli. During the time of King Thondaiman in Tamil Nadu, three families with following family names apparently settled down at Tellippalai: Sampaka mappanan, Santhirasekara maappanan and Kanakarayan

== History since 1658 (Dutch rule) ==
The province of Belligamme [Valligamam] has 14 Churches, the chief where-of is Telipole a large structure, with a double row of Pillars; the House thereunto belonging is the work of the Jesuits, beautifyeo with a pleasant Garden, handsome Court and most delicious Vineyards affording most sorts of Indian Fruits, and water’d with several springs . . . Old hand drawn picture given below shows two small hills in the background. The two hills are between Keerimalai and Maviddapuram which are about two kilometers from Tellippalai. The hills may have been visible from Tellippalai during those times.

== History since 1812 ==
It was a mission location when the American Ceylon Mission (ACM) came to Sri Lanka in the 19th century. It was known as Tillipally in ACM documents. American Ceylon Mission established number of churches and Christian schools in Jaffna District which provided western education.

The First English School of Jaffna, which led to Union College, Tellippalai was founded in Dutch Hall in 1816 by the Rev. Daniel Poor and Edward Warren, American citizens. At that time, the bitter consequences of the War of 1812 had soured the feelings of the governor of the British colony of Ceylon, Robert Brownrigg, against all Americans. In 1813 he refused permission for the first batch of American-Ceylon Missionaries of New England to settle in Colombo.

They were sent to the arid Jaffna peninsula, permitted to occupy only Dutch buildings, and refused permission to proselytize in Jaffna or Point Pedro. Brownrigg also refused them a charter to provide higher education. The Rev. Samuel Newell arrived on 7 September 1813 on the Jaffna peninsula and occupied the Tellippilai Union premises, which at that time consisted of dilapidated and snake-infested structures dating back to the Portuguese of the 16th century.

Edward Warren having a completed two-year course in Medicine and Surgery at Dartmouth Medical School (Geisel School of Medicine), erected a small hospital in Tellippalai.

First printing press was established at Tellippallai in 1820 by American Ceylon Mission. Later the press was moved to Manipay, and moved back to Tellippalai again in 1901.

In 1910 Mahajana College, Tellippalai was founded at Ampanai, Tellippalai by T. A. Thuraiyappapillai.

The Tellippalai Hospital or Tellippalai base hospital was built in the late 1960s as a replacement for the old hospital in Kankesanthurai

There are number of old Hindu temples located in the Tellippalai area.

Sri Durgadevi Temple of Tellippalai has become one of the most popular places of worship in the last few decades.

== Schools ==
- Union College, Tellippalai
- Mahajana College, Tellippalai

== Gallery ==
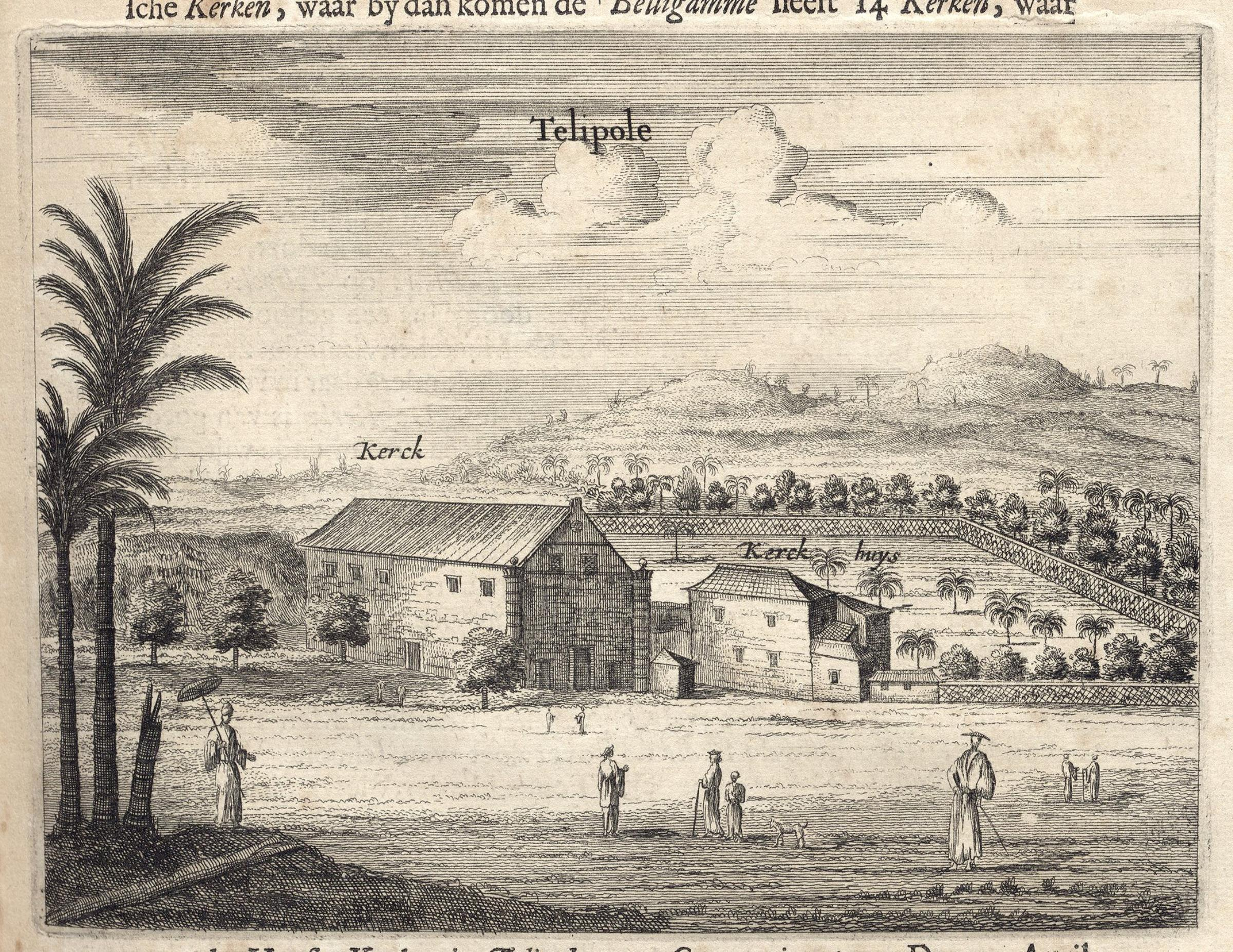
Church in Tellippalai in 1665 during Dutch rule.

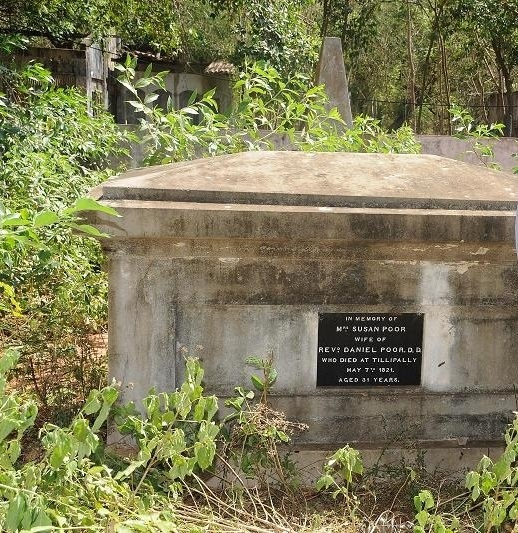
Burial place of Susan Poor wife of American Missionary Daniel Poor who died in 1821 adjacent to Tellippalai church .

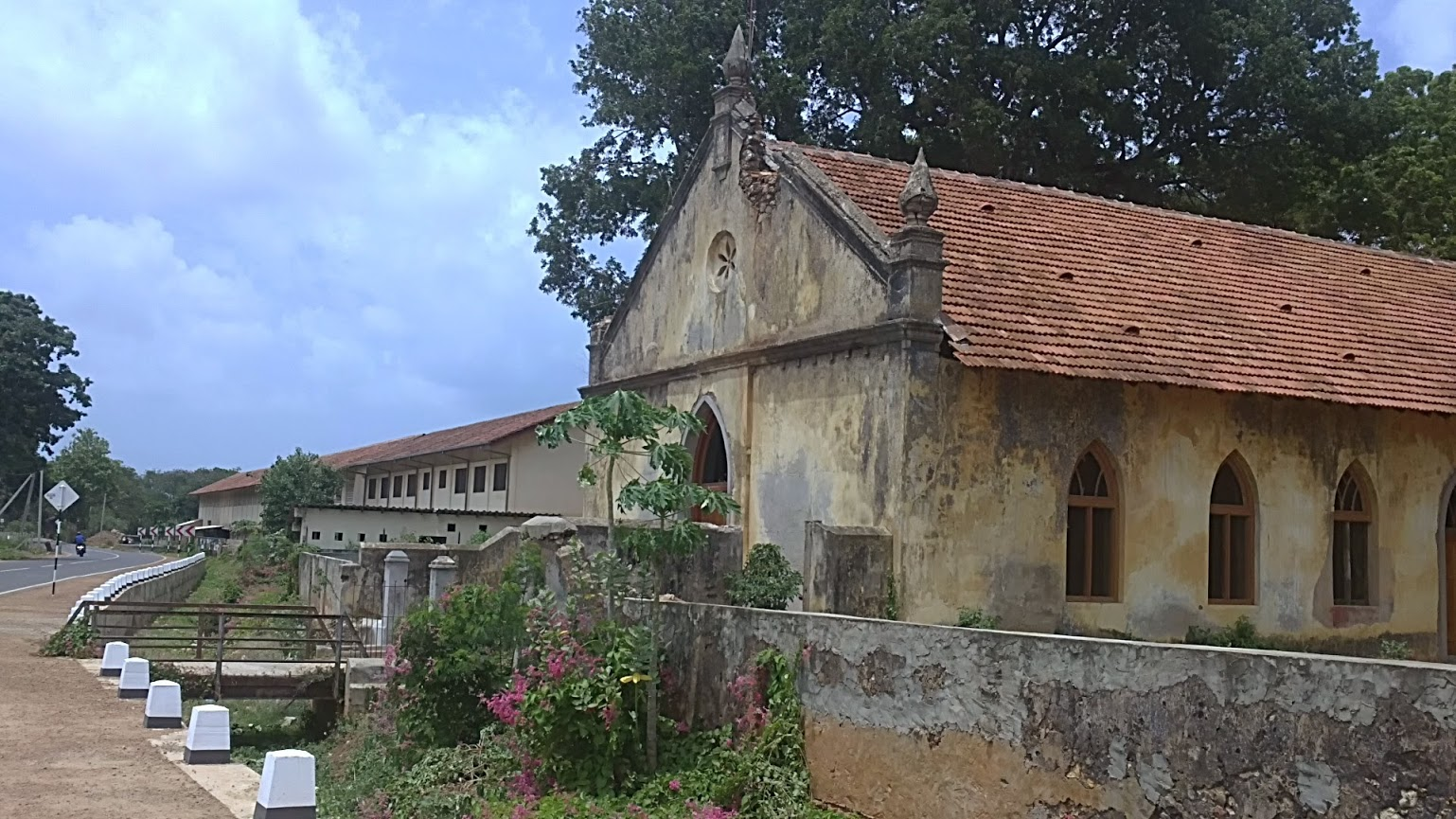
Tellippalai church in damaged condition due to civil war and Union College in 2011

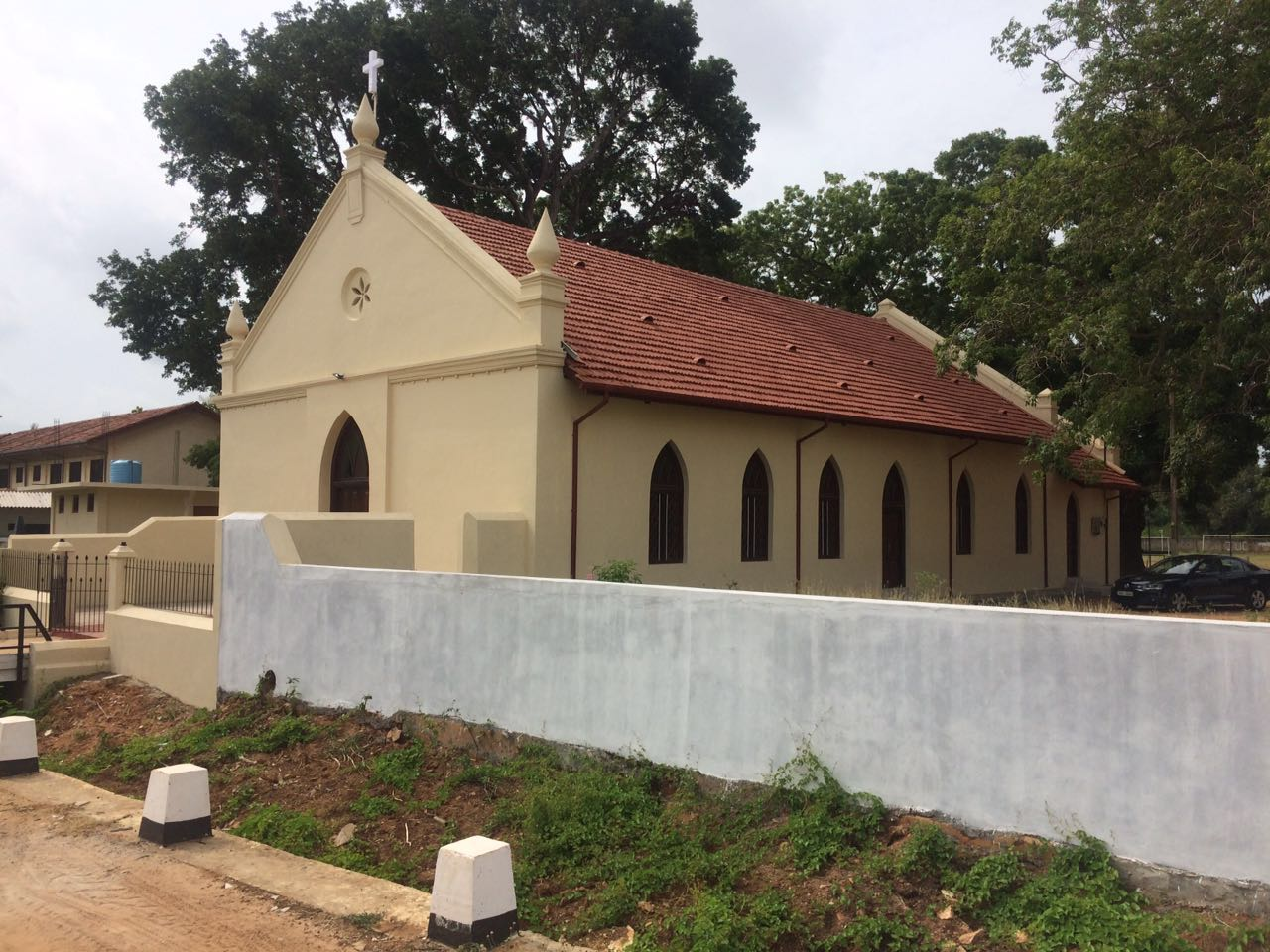
Refurbished Tellippalai church (2016)

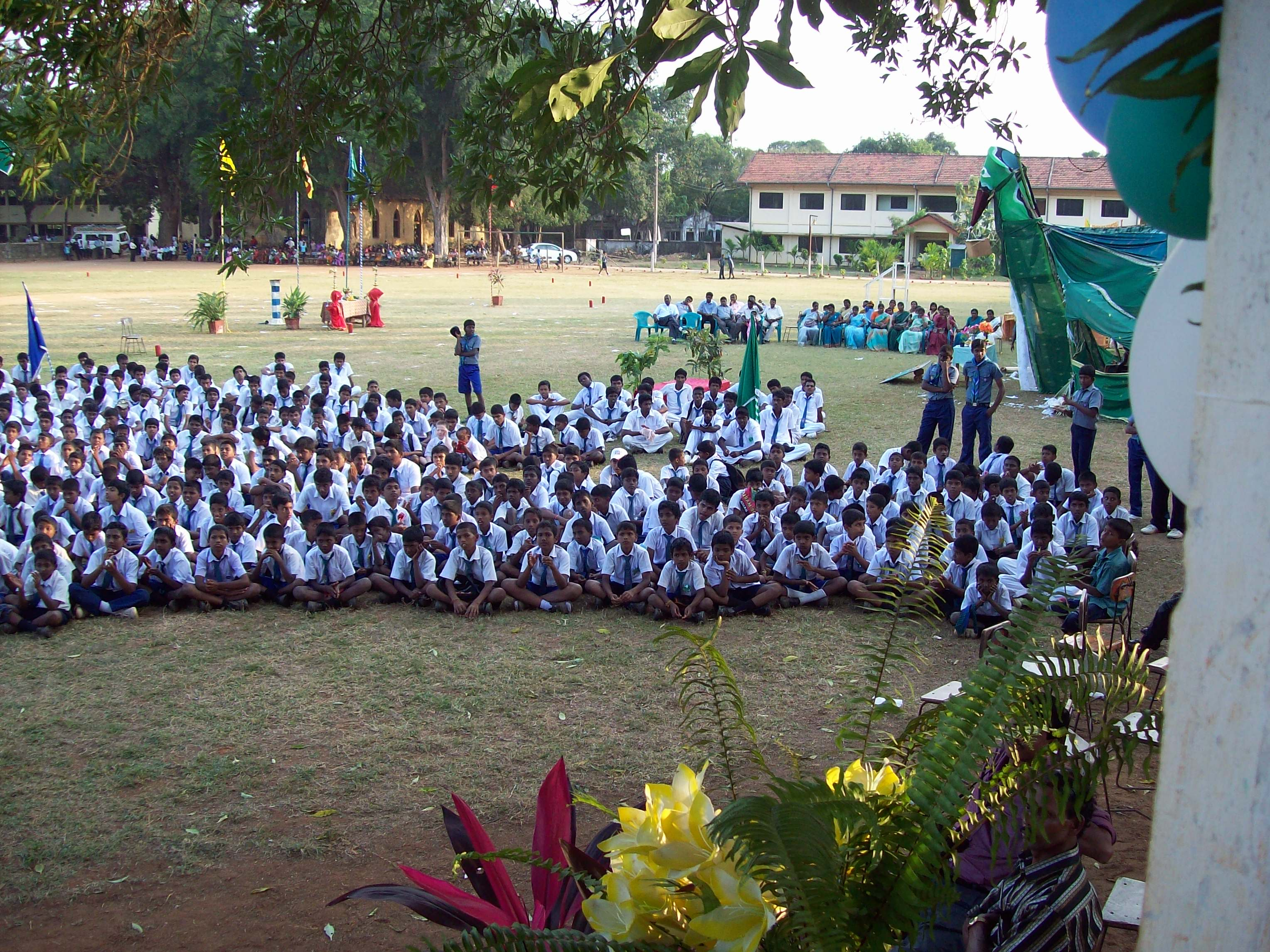
Union college play ground in 2011 athletic meet

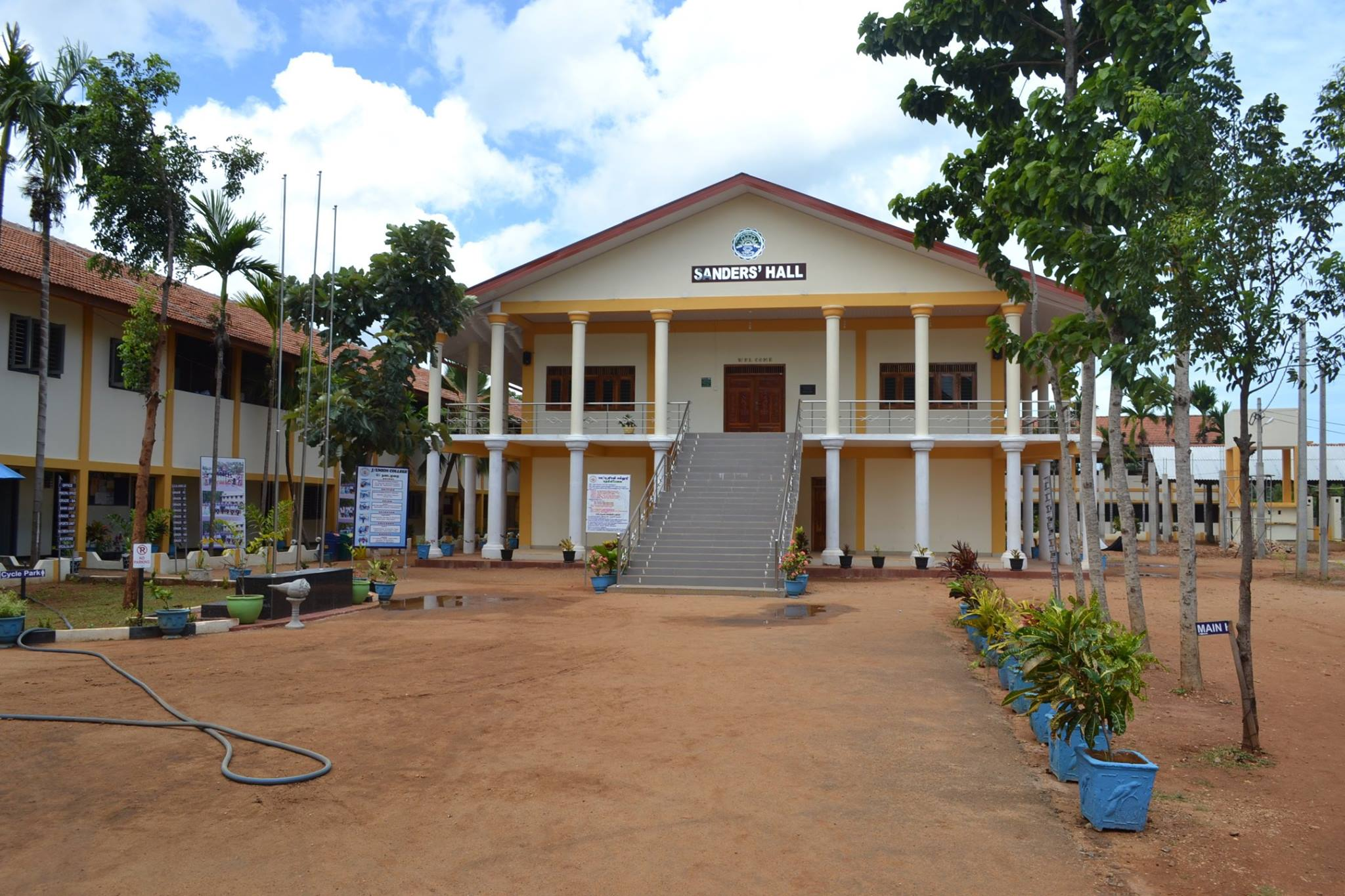
Union college Sanders Hall built for the bicentenary in 2016

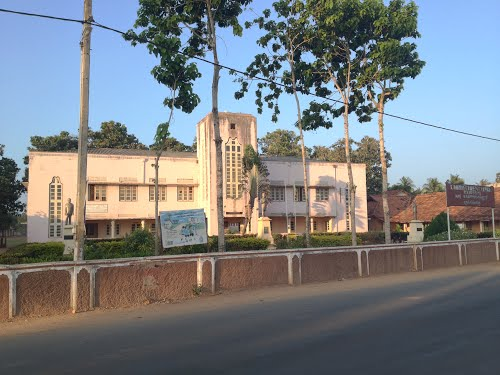
Mahajana College main building

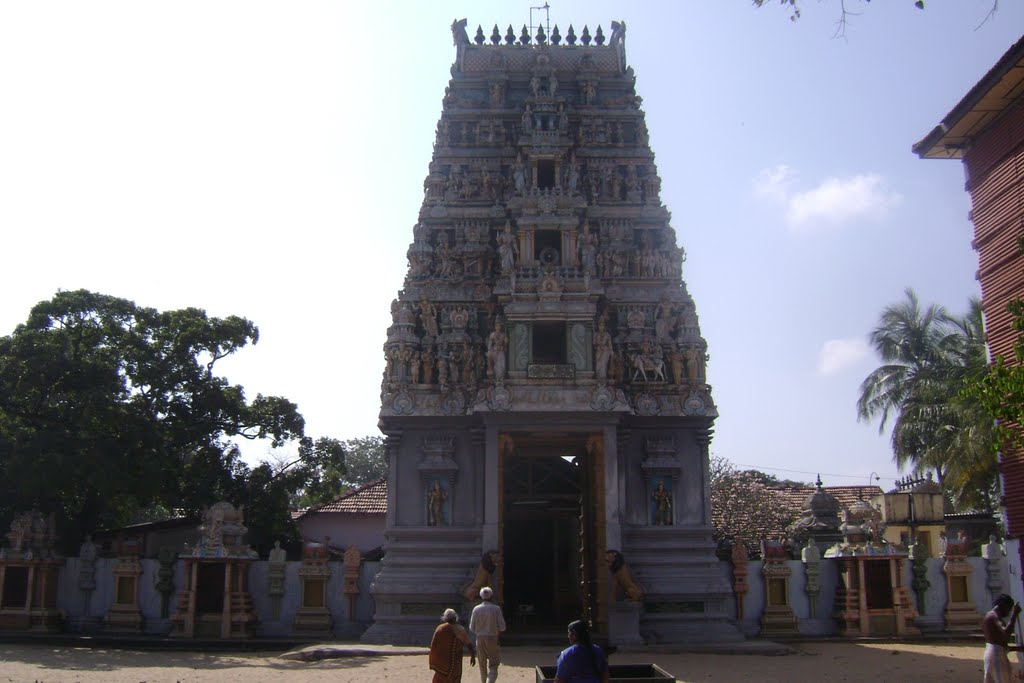
Thurkkai amman Kovil

== Notable personalities from Tellippalai ==
S. J. V. Chelvanayakam - Former leader of Tamil United Liberation Front and Federal party (Sri Lanka) or Illankai Tamil Arasu Kachchi and member of parliament for Kankesanthurai electorate 1947 -1977.

S. Vithiananthan, former Vice chancellor of University of Jaffna between 1979-1988. He was a Professor of Tamil at University of Peradeniya and University of Jaffna

Tellipalai Rajaratnam or Wanarajah Rajaratnam, former Supreme Court judge and Member of Parliament

I. P. Thurairatnam, principal of Union College, Tellippalai between 1935-1964. During this period the school has become one of the top schools in Jaffna. As the secretary of the Jaffna Students Congress (later known as Jaffna youth Congress), he invited Mahatma Gandhi to Jaffna district in 1927 and Gandhi’s reply is given below:

"As at the Ashram, Sabarmati

3-2-’27

Dear Friend, I have your letter. During my visit to the South, I should love to respond to your invitation. But there are many difficulties in the way. If I go to Jaffna, I must go to other places in Ceylon which means quite a few days there. This year I want to devote purely to Khadi work and Khadi collection. If therefore I went to Ceylon, I would want to make Khadi collections. The best thing I can therefore do is to forward your letter to Sjt. C. Rajagopalachariar who is organising the tour in the South and let him decide. Please correspond with him. His address is Gandhi Ashram, Tiruchengodu (South India).

Yours sincerely,

M. K. Gandhi"

Mahatma Gandhi and C. Rajagopalachari visited Jaffna and had a meeting at Tellippalai as well.

T. A. Thuraiyappapillai, scholar, poet and founder of Mahajana College, Tellippalai in 1910. He was a former teacher of Union College, Tellippalai

T. T. Jeyaratnam, former principal of Mahajana College, Tellippalai and son of T. A. Thuraiyappapillai. He developed the school to one of the top schools in Jaffna

Pandit Thangamma Appakutty, former teacher of Union College, Tellippalai and the key person in developing the Sri Durgadevi Temple of Tellippalai,

Sinnathamby Sivamaharajah, former Member of Parliament

D. T. Niles Niles became general secretary of the National Christian Council of Ceylon. He was chairman of the Youth Department of the World Council of Churches between 1948 and 1952. He was appointed Executive Secretary of the Department of Evangelism in the World Council of Churches in 1953.
