= Nadarajah Raviraj =

Sri Lankan politician (1962–2006)

Hon. Maamanithar Nadarajah Raviraj
- நடராஜா ரவிராஜ்

Member of Parliament for Jaffna District
- In office 2001–2006
- Succeeded by: N. Srikantha

16th Mayor of Jaffna
- In office 9 January 2001 – 18 December 2001
- Preceded by: Pon Sivapalan
- Succeeded by: Sellan Kandaiyan

Personal details
- Born: 25 June 1962 Chavakachcheri, Ceylon
- Died: 10 November 2006 (aged 44) Colombo, Sri Lanka
- Party: Illankai Tamil Arasu Kachchi
- Other political affiliations: Tamil National Alliance
- Profession: Lawyer

Nadarajah Raviraj (Tamil: நடராஜா ரவிராஜ், romanized: naṭarājā ravirāj, [n̪aɖaˈɾaːdʑaː ˈɾaʋiɾaːdʑ]; 25 June 1962 – 10 November 2006) was a Sri Lankan lawyer and politician who served as Mayor of Jaffna in 2001 and a Member of Parliament for Jaffna District from 2001 to 2006. A member of the Tamil National Alliance, he was shot dead on 10 November 2006 in Colombo.

== Early life and family ==
Nadarajah Raviraj was born 25 June 1962. His family were from Chavakachcheri in northern Ceylon. Both of his parents were teachers – his father taught at Chavakachcheri Hindu College and his mother taught at Chavakachcheri Hindu Ladies College. Raviraj was educated at Chavakachcheri Hindu College, Drieberg College, Chavakachcheri and St. John's College, Jaffna.

Raviraj was married to Sasikala, a teacher at Bishop's College, Colombo. They had a daughter (Praveena) and son (Yuthishthran).

== Career ==
Raviraj became an attorney at law of the Supreme Court in November 1987. He was a human rights lawyer for Home for Human Rights from 1984 to 1990. He worked at the Attorney-General's Department between 1990 and 1993. He rejoined Home for Human Rights in 1993, working for them until 1997. He then started a private practice firm, Raviraj and Associates, which specialised in Prevention of Terrorism Act and Emergency Regulations cases. Raviraj represented clients in the Supreme Court, Court of Appeal and High Courts in Ampara, Batticaloa, Jaffna, Trincomalee, Vavuniya and other cities.

Raviraj was a member of the Civil Monitoring Committee which monitored extra-judicial killings, abductions and disappearances in Sri Lanka. He was an ambassador of peace for the Interreligious and International Federation for World Peace and Interreligious International Peace Council in 2004.

=== Politics ===
Raviraj joined the Tamil United Liberation Front (TULF) in 1987, joining its central committee in 1990 and becoming its legal advisor in 1998. He contested the 1998 local government election as a TULF candidate and was elected to Jaffna Municipal Council. The TULF Mayor of Jaffna Sarojini Yogeswaran was assassinated on 17 May 1998 and her successor Pon Sivapalan was assassinated on 11 September 1998. Following the assassination of its mayoral nominee Pon Mathimugarajah on 26 December 1998, the TULF decided not to appoint a mayor which resulted in Raviraj, who was deputy mayor, becoming de facto mayor.

Raviraj was appointed to the TULF politburo in 2000. He contested the 2000 parliamentary election as one of the TULF's candidates in Jaffna District but failed to get elected. On 9 January 2001 Raviraj was officially sworn in as Mayor of Jaffna. He became the TULF's Administrative Secretary in 2001.

On 20 October 2001 the All Ceylon Tamil Congress, Eelam People's Revolutionary Liberation Front, Tamil Eelam Liberation Organization and TULF formed the Tamil National Alliance (TNA). Raviraj contested the 2001 parliamentary election as one of the TNA's candidates in Jaffna District. On 28 November 2001 the TNA, including Raviraj, were campaigning in Naranthanai on Velanaitivu when they were attacked by the Eelam People's Democratic Party, a government backed paramilitary group, as Sri Lanka Navy personnel looked on. Two TNA activists were killed and several others, including Raviraj, were injured. Raviraj was elected and entered Parliament. He subsequently resigned as Mayor of Jaffna. He was re-elected at the 2004 parliamentary election.

== Death ==
On 9 November 2006, Raviraj led a demonstration outside the UNICEF office in Colombo protesting against the Vaharai bombing in which 45 civilians were killed by army shelling. The following morning Raviraj took part in a live discussion on TV Derana between 7.00am and 7.30am. Afterwards he returned to his home in Manning Town, Narahenpita, had breakfast and changed for work. Raviraj had to drive to work himself as his driver was on leave. He had intended to use his wife's car but finding its battery drained got into his Toyota Land Cruiser Prado (reg WP KE 1279). Raviraj's police bodyguard Sergeant Lokuwellamurage Shantha Laxman Lokuwella got onto the passenger seat. At 8.39am, as Raviraj was slowly driving down Martha Road and turning into Elvitigala Mawatha, when a motorcycle (reg JE 3507) coming from the opposite direction stopped nearby. The motorcycle's pillion rider got down, removed his helmet, crossed the road and waited on the pavement with a bag over his shoulder. As Raviraj's vehicle went past, the waiting pillion rider ripped open the shoulder bag and fired the T-56 rifle hidden inside. Raviraj's vehicle was hit from the front, side and rear at point blank range. After firing an entire magazine the assassin ran back to the motorcycle which then sped off, turning on Martha Road. The shoulder bag, with the T-56 inside, and the assassin's helmet were left at the roadside. According to the police a rickshaw parked nearby also drove off after the shooting. They believed that its driver had been a lookout who had tipped off the assassins about the location of Raviraj's vehicle using a mobile phone.

Raviraj had been shot five times and Lokuwella eight times. Both were rushed to Colombo National Hospital where Lokuwella was pronounced dead on arrival. Raviraj was clinically dead and emergency surgery was carried out but at 9.20am he was pronounced dead. On 10 November 2006 the LTTE conferred the title Maamanithar (great human being) on Raviraj. Raviraj's body had to be flown to northern Sri Lanka because the Sri Lankan government refused to open the A9 highway. Raviraj's funeral took place on 15 November 2006 at the Kannadipiddy cremation ground in Chavakachcheri.

Raviraj's assassination received condemnation from around the world. The TNA blamed the assassination on paramilitaries working with the army. The University Teachers for Human Rights (UTHR) quoted sources as saying that the main organiser of the assassination was former air force member Nishantha Gajanayake, an employee of defence secretary Gotabhaya Rajapaksa, brother of President Mahinda Rajapaksa. The UTHR further claimed that the assassination was carried out by the Karuna Group/Tamil Makkal Viduthalai Pulikal (TMVP) with the assistance of the Eelam People's Democratic Party (EPDP) paramilitary group, military intelligence and a Buddhist monk affiliated with the Jathika Hela Urumaya. EPDP leader Douglas Devanananda denied any involvement in the assassination.

A shadowy anti-LTTE group calling itself Seerum Padai (Aggressive Army) claimed responsibility for the assassination, saying that it was a "serious message to those who betray our homeland".

=== Investigation ===
Raviraj's assassination took place in the heart of Colombo near a security force base and on a stretch of road between police checkpoints. Several government buildings including the Telecommunications Regulatory Authority, the Registrar of Motor Vehicles Department and the headquarters of the Sri Lanka Corps of Military Police were close by. According to the police many people witnessed the assassination and came forward to give information. A suspect was arrested in Wellawatte on 12 November 2006 and based on information provided by him seven further suspects were arrested in Borella, Cinnamon Gardens, Narahenpita and Wellawatte.

Detectives from the British Metropolitan Police Service were brought in to investigate the assassination. After initial reservations about the possibility that the suspects may face the death penalty, five British detectives arrived in Sri Lanka on 4 January 2007 to assist the Sri Lankan Criminal Investigation Department (CID). After sharing their expertise, the British detectives left Sri Lanka on 13 January 2007, taking some evidence for further forensic tests.

The police investigation found that the motorcycle used in the assassination had been bought by Arul from brokers Nalaka Mathakadeera (Matagaweere) and Ravindra. Arul had been living at the house of S. K. T. Jayasuriya. Jayasuriya was former soldier, who had been dismissed from the army, who was now working as a private security officer for a former EPDP Member of Parliament who was living in Switzerland. Mathakadeera and Jayasuriya were arrested but both were later released on bail when investigations revealed that they were not in Colombo at the time of the assassination. Jayasuriya informed the police that Arul was a former member of the militant Liberation Tigers of Tamil Eelam. Arul was also a nephew of the former EPDP and was receiving protection from Jayasuriya. Arrest warrants were issued for Arul and Ravindra whom the police suspected had fled to LTTE controlled territory. The investigation stalled thereafter and no progress was made.

=== Renewed investigation ===
Following the defeat of Rajapaksa at the presidential election in January 2015, the new government announced that it would re-investigate several unsolved high profile assassinations, including that of Raviraj, which occurred during Rajapaksa's nine-year reign. Three navy personnel (Lt. Commander Munasinghe Aarachchige Don Nishantha Sampath Munasinghe, Lt. Commander Hettiarachchi Mudiyanselage Prasad Chandana Kumara Hettiarachchi alias Sampath and Petty Officer Deliwala Gedara Gamini Seneviratne alias Senevi) were arrested by the CID in March 2015 in connection with Raviraj's assassination. A total of nine suspects were listed in connection with the assassination. The rickshaw involved in the assassination was recovered by the CID in June 2015. In November 2015 former soldier Nalaka Mathakadeera, J. L. Mahinda and Tennis Aruna Shantha Edirisinghe were arrested in connection with the assassination.

In October 2015 The Sunday Leader identified Petty Officer Seneviratne as the assassin and claimed that the weapon used in the assassination had been handed to the Pillayan, leader of the TMVP paramilitary group, by Colonel Shammi Karunaratne of the army. Pillayan then gave the weapon to Sivakanthan Vivekanandan alias Charan who then handed it to Seneviratne.

On 3 November 2015 six people – three navy personnel (Pradeep Chaminda (Chandane) alias Vajira, Lieutenant Commander Hettiarachchi and Petty Officer Seneviratne), two Karuna Group/TMVP paramilitaries (Palanasami Suresh alias Sami and Sivakanthan Vivekanandan) and a police officer (Fabian Royston Toussaint) – were charged with Raviraj's murder. A fourth navy personnel, Lieutenant Commander Munasinghe Arachchige Nilantha Sampath Munasinghe alias Navy Sampath, was charged in December 2015. Three of the seven charged, Suresh, Toussaint and Vivekanandan, are not in custody. Toussaint is believed to be running an eco-consultancy business, Eco Support Consulting, in Australia. Vivekanandan is believed to be in Switzerland.

Two suspects in the case, Nalaka Mathakadeera and Tennis Aruna Shantha Edirisinghe, were released by Colombo Additional Magistrate Nirosha Fernando on 8 December 2015. Another suspect, former Police Constable Sampath Prithiviraj Wijeya Wickrema Manamperige Sanjaya Preethi Viraj, had turned state witness.

=== Trial and acquittal ===
The trial of the six suspects (Chaminda, Hettiarachchi, Seneviratne, Suresh, Toussaint and Vivekanandan) began on 7 September 2016 at Colombo High Court in front of Judge Manilal Waidyatilaka. On 27 October 2016 Waidyatilaka allowed the defendants' attorney's request for the case to be heard by a jury consisting exclusively of Sinhala speakers. This was despite objections from lawyers representing Raviraj's family. Police Constable Viraj, the state witness, was released on 22 December 2016. On 24 December 2016 the all Sinhala jury unanimously acquitted all five defendants who were subsequently released. In an unusual move, the verdict came shortly after midnight.

== Electoral history ==
Electoral history of Nadarajah Raviraj
Election	Constituency	Party	Votes	Result
1998 local	Jaffna MC	TULF		Elected
2000 parliamentary	Jaffna District	TULF		Not elected
2001 parliamentary	Jaffna District	TNA	19,263	Elected
2004 parliamentary	Jaffna District	TNA	42,965	Elected
