= Manivannan (disambiguation) =

Manivannan (1954–2013) was an actor, director and social activist

Manivannan may also refer to:

== Surname ==
- Q Manivannan, Scottish politician
- Raghu Manivannan (born 1984), Indian actor
- Ramu Manivannan, Indian academic
- Sharanya Manivannan, Indian writer
- V. Manivannan , Sri Lankan politician

== Given name ==
- Manivannan Gowindasamy
