= Jaffna Hindu College =

- யாழ்ப்பாணம் இந்துக் கல்லூரி යාපනය හින්දු විද්‍යාලය

Location
- K. K. S. Road; Jaffna, Jaffna District, Northern Province; Sri Lanka; 9°40′42.70″N 80°0′43.60″E

Information
- School type: Public national 1AB
- Established: 23 October 1890; 135 years ago
- School district: Jaffna Education Zone
- Authority: Ministry of Education
- School number: 1002002
- Principal: Ratnam Senthilmaran
- Teaching staff: 86
- Grades: 6-13
- Gender: Boys
- Age range: 11-19
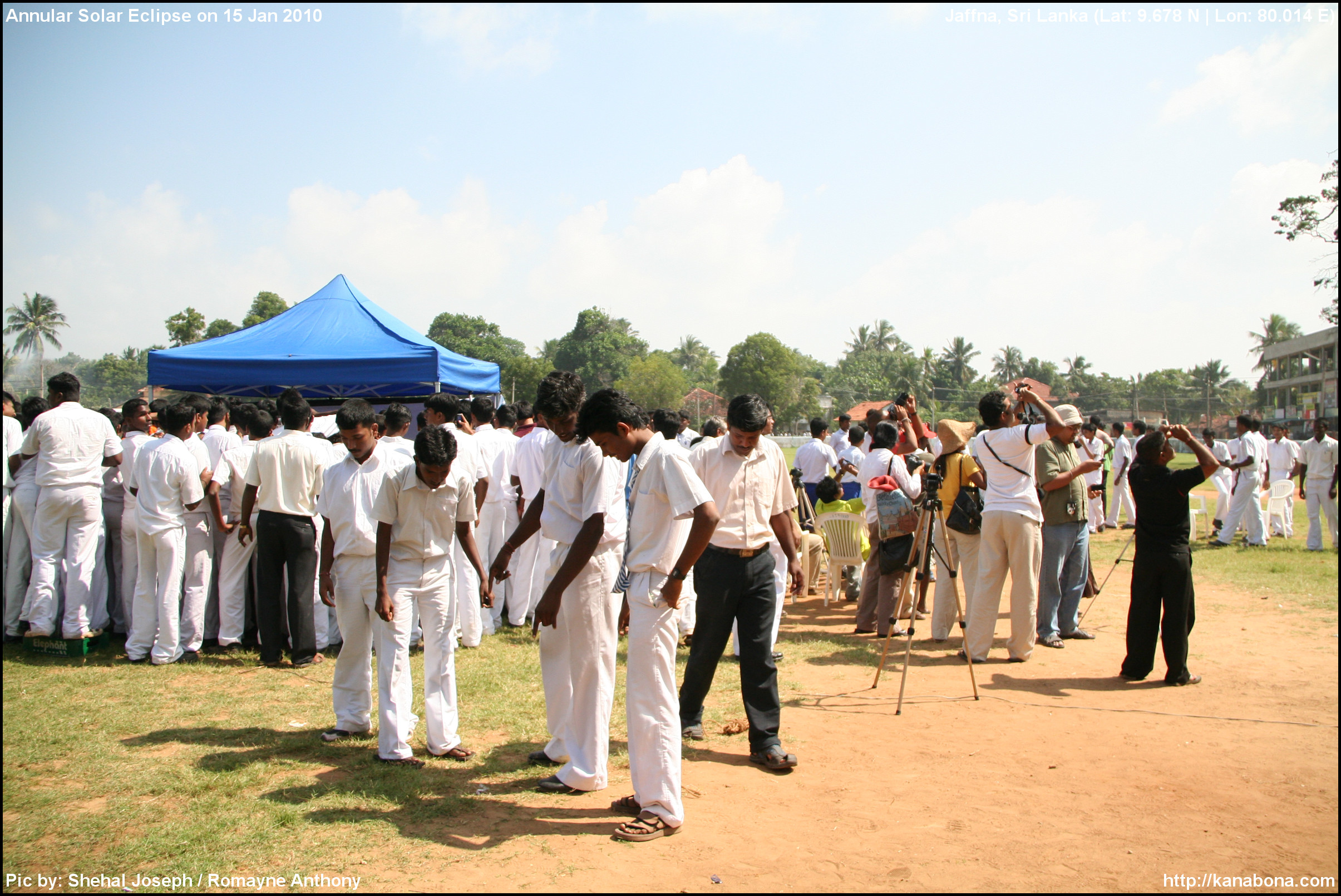
- 2010 January annular solar eclipse: Jaffna Hindu College students gazing at the sun

Jaffna Hindu College (Tamil: யாழ்ப்பாணம் இந்துக் கல்லூரி, romanized: Yāḻppāṇam Intuk Kallūri; Sinhala: යාපනය හින්දු විද්‍යාලය, romanized: Yāpanaya Hindu Vidyālaya; abbreviated as JHC) is a national school in Jaffna, Sri Lanka. It was founded in 1887 by a group of Hindu people who wanted an English language alternative to the Christian missionary schools.

== History ==
In the late 19th century all the English language schools in the area were run by Christian missionaries. In 1886, Williams Nevins Muthukumaru Sithamparapillai founded The Native Town High School. The school encountered financial problems and in 1889 it was taken over by Sinnatamby Nagalingam, who re-located it to Vananarponnai. The school was renamed Nagalingam Town High School. In 1890, the school was handed over to the Jaffna Saiva (Samaya) Paripalana Sabhai. The school was moved to its present site and renamed The Hindu High School.

== Big Match ==
JHC play Hindu College Colombo in an annual cricket match known as the Battle of the Hindus. The first match took place in 2008.

== Principals ==
- 1890-92 S. Godman Appapillai
- 1892-09 Nevins Selvadurai
- 1910-13 A. Shiva Rao
- 1913-14 B. Sanjiva Rao
- 1914-26 Nevins Selvadurai
- 1926-27 W. A. Troupe
- 1927-28 M. Sabarathnasinghe
- 1928-33 V. R. Venkataramanan
- 1933-52 A. Cumaraswamy
- 1953-61 V. M. Asaipillai
- 1962-64 C. Sabaratnam
- 1964-71 N. Sabaratnam
- 1971 M. Karthigesan
- 1971-75 E. Sabalingam
- 1975-84 P. S. Kumaraswamy
- 1984-90 S. Ponnampalam
- 1990-91 K. S. Kugathasan
- 1991-96 A. Panchalingam
- 1996-05 A. Srikumaran
- 2005-14 V. Ganesarajah
- 2014–17 I. Thayanandarajah
- 2015–19 S.Nimalan
- 2019–present Ratnam Senthilmaran

== Notable alumni ==
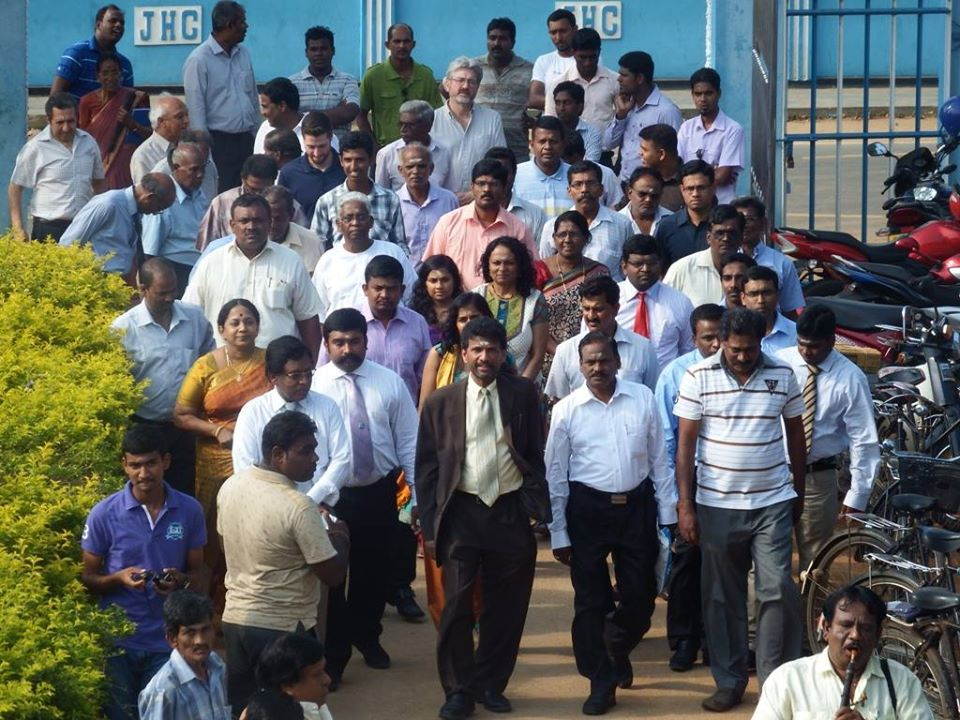
Professor Siva Sivananthan, an alumnus, is accompanied by E. Saravanapavan (Member of Parliament for Jaffna District), Principal and staff to deliver a guest lecture at the 73rd Commemoration Day and Achievers' Special Lecture Event of the Rotary Club of Jaffna, at Jaffna Hindu College on 15 April 2014

- K. Aiyadurai – Chairman of Jaffna Urban Council
- Eliathamby Ambikairajah – Head of the School of Electrical Engineering & Telecommunications, University of New South Wales
- P. Ayngaranesan – Provincial Minister of Agriculture
- A. M. A. Azeez – Member of the Senate, Assistant Government Agent, Principal of Zahira College, Colombo
- C. Balasingham – Permanent Secretary, Ministry of Health
- P. Balasundarampillai – Vice-Chancellor of the University of Jaffna
- C. Coomaraswamy – Member of the Senate, High Commissioner, Government Agent
- Yogendra Duraiswamy – diplomat
- B. Gajatheepan – Member of the Northern Provincial Council for Jaffna District
- Sri Ranga Jeyaratnam – Member of Parliament for Nuwara Eliya District and TV broadcaster
- K. Kailasapathy – President of the Jaffna Campus of the University of Sri Lanka
- P. Kanagasabapathy – Dean of the Science Faculty, Jaffna Campus of the University of Sri Lanka
- R. Kanagasuntheram – Dean of the Faculty of Medicine, University of Jaffna
- P. Kandiah – Member of Parliament for Point Pedro
- V. A. Kandiah – Member of Parliament for Kayts
- Nalliah Kumaraguruparan – Member of the Western Provincial Council for Colombo District
- S. Mahadevan – co-founder of Capital Maharaja
- S. Nadesan – Member of the Senate, leading lawyer
- S. Nagarajah – Mayor of Jaffna
- K. Navaratnam – Member of Parliament for Jaffna District
- K. Palakidnar – President of the Court of Appeal
- V. M. Panchalingam – Government Agent for Jaffna District
- Shiva Pasupati – Attorney General of Sri Lanka
- Pottu Amman (Shanmugalingam Sivashankar ) – senior member of the Liberation Tigers of Tamil Eelam
- S. Rajandram – co-founder of Capital Maharaja
- E. Saravanapavan – Member of Parliament for Jaffna District
- S. Selvanayagam – Head of the Department of Geography, University of Jaffna
- Suppiah Sharvananda – Chief Justice of Sri Lanka, Governor of the Western Province
- R. Sivagurunathan – Editor-in-Chief of Thinakaran
- Pon Sivakumaran – Militant
- Siva Sivananthan – Director of the Microphysics Laboratory, University of Illinois at Chicago
- V. Sivasubramaniam – Judge, Supreme Court of Ceylon
- T. Somasekaram – Surveyor General of Sri Lanka
- M. Srikantha – Permanent Secretary, Ministry of Agriculture & Lands and Ministry of Irrigation & Power
- K. Sripavan – Chief Justice of Sri Lanka
- S. Sritharan – Member of Parliament for Jaffna District
- K. Thavalingam – Surveyor General of Sri Lanka
- Thileepan (Rasaiah Parthipan) – member of the Liberation Tigers of Tamil Eelam who died while on hunger strike
- C. Vanniasingam – Member of Parliament for Kopay, co-founder of the Illankai Tamil Arasu Kachchi (Federal Party)
- N. Vithyatharan – editor of Uthayan

== See also ==
- List of schools in Northern Province, Sri Lanka
