= List of mayors of Jaffna =

Mayor of Jaffna
- யாழ்ப்பாண முதல்வர்
- Incumbent; Vivekanandaraja Madivadani since 13 June 2025
- Style: The Honourable
- Member of: Jaffna Municipal Council
- Constituting instrument: Local Government Ordinance No. 11 of 1920
- Formation: 1 January 1923
- First holder: A. Canagaratnam
- Deputy: Vacant
- Website: Jaffna Municipal Council

The Mayor of Jaffna is the head of the Jaffna Municipal Council, the local authority for the city of Jaffna in northern Sri Lanka. The mayor is currently Vivekanandaraja Madivadani.

== Mayors and chairmen ==
† died in office

Name	Party	Took office	Left office	Title	Refs
A. Canagaratnam				Chairman	
R. R. Nalliah				Chairman	
Sam A. Sabapathy		1937	1939	Chairman	
K. Aiyadurai		1942	1943	Chairman	
Sam A. Sabapathy		6 January 1949	31 December 1949	Mayor	
Cathiravelu Ponnambalam		6 January 1950	31 December 1951	Mayor	
Sam A. Sabapathy		11 January 1952	31 December 1954	Mayor	
M. A. M. M. Sultan		5 January 1955	31 December 1955	Mayor	
S. A. Navaratnam		16 January 1956	31 December 1957	Mayor	
P. Kasipillai		6 July 1960	31 December 1960	Mayor	
T. S. Thurairajah		7 January 1961	12 February 1962	Mayor	
M. Jacob		19 February 1962	15 May 1963	Mayor	
S. A. Tharmalingam	Ilankai Tamil Arasu Kachchi	28 May 1962	4 April 1963	Mayor	
P. M. John		11 April 1963	6 May 1963	Mayor	
T. S. Thurairajah		15 May 1963	6 May 1963	Mayor	
S. S. Mahadeva		8 July 1965	31 December 1965	Mayor	
S. Nagarajah		8 January 1966	24 March 1966	Mayor	
Alfred Duraiappah †	Sri Lanka Freedom Party	15 February 1970	27 July 1975	Mayor	
R. Viswanathan		1 June 1979	31 May 1983	Mayor	
Sarojini Yogeswaran †	Tamil United Liberation Front	11 March 1998	17 May 1998	Mayor	
Pon Sivapalan †	Tamil United Liberation Front	29 June 1998	11 September 1998	Mayor	
Nadarajah Raviraj	Tamil United Liberation Front	9 January 2001	18 December 2001	Mayor	
Sellan Kandaiyan	Tamil United Liberation Front	15 January 2002	13 February 2003	Mayor	
Yogeswari Patkunarajah	Eelam People's Democratic Party	1 September 2009	?	Mayor	
E. Arnold	Ilankai Tamil Arasu Kachchi	26 February 2018	30 December 2020	Mayor	
V. Manivannan	Tamil National People's Front	30 December 2020	December 2022	Mayor	
Vivekanandaraja Madivadani	Ilankai Tamil Arasu Kachchi	13 June 2025	Incumbent	Mayor	

== Sources ==
- "Former Mayors". Jaffna Municipal Council.
