= Nallur =

Nallur can refer to:

== Places ==
=== India ===
- Nallur, Anantapur district, Andhra Pradesh
- Nallur, Erode, Tamil Nadu
- Nallur, Kanyakumari, Tamil Nadu
- Nallur, Tirunelveli, Tamil Nadu
- Nallur, Tirupur, Tamil Nadu
- South Nallur, Coimbatore district, Tamil Nadu
- Nallur, a village in Balkonda mandala, Nizamabad district, Telangana

=== Sri Lanka ===
- Nallur Electoral District, a former electoral district in Sri Lanka
- Nallur, Jaffna, a town in the district of Jaffna, Sri Lanka

== See also ==
- Nellore, Andhra Pradesh
