= S. Nagarajah =

Sri Lankan Tamil lawyer and Mayor of Jaffna

Honourable S. Nagarajah MMC

11th Mayor of Jaffna
- In office 8 January 1966 – 24 March 1966
- Preceded by: S. S. Mahadeva
- Succeeded by: K. Ponnambalam

Personal details
- Born: 28 February 1931
- Died: 8 May 2008 (aged 77) New Jersey, United States
- Education: Jaffna Hindu College; Madras Christian College
- Profession: Lawyer
- Ethnicity: Sri Lankan Tamil

Sinnathamby Nagarajah (28 February 1931 – 8 May 2008) was a Sri Lankan Tamil lawyer and Mayor of Jaffna.

== Early life and family ==
Nagarajah was born on 28 February 1931. He was educated at Jaffna Hindu College. After school he went to the Madras Christian College from where he obtained a bachelor's degree and master's degree in English Literature.

== Career ==
After returning to Ceylon Nagarajah worked as an attorney-at-law in the north and east of the country.

Nagarajah was elected to Jaffna Municipal Council, serving as the city's mayor in 1966. He became vice-chairman of the newly created Jaffna District Development Council in 1981 but resigned in 1982.

After the Indian Peace Keeping Force occupied Jaffna in 1989 Nagarajah moved to the Vanni with the rebel Liberation Tigers of Tamil Eelam (LTTE). He taught at the LTTE's Tamil Eelam Judiciary Department.

== Later life ==
Nagarajah moved to New Jersey, USA in the 1990s and was active in the diaspora community. He died on 8 May 2008 in New Jersey.
