= Shantisagara =

Shantisagara may refer to:

- Shanti Sagara, also called Sulekere (Kannada: ಸೂಳೆಕೆರೆ) Asia's second largest irrigation tank.
- Shantisagar (1872–1955), Digambar Jain Acharya of the 20th century, and the first Digambar Jain monk to wander in North India after several centuries. He was given the title Charitra Chakravarti.
