= Maradana College of Technology =

Technical college in Sri Lanka

Maradana College of Technology is the oldest technical college in Sri Lanka. Formally known as the Ceylon Technical College which was an institution of higher education for Technical and Scientific fields in Ceylon and a government department. It was established as the Government Technical College in 1893 at Maradana, Colombo. In 1906 with renamed as Ceylon Technical College, it was the center for study of science such as chemistry, physics, biology and all technical training and development special in the areas of civil, electrical and mechanical engineering. The Maradana Technical College Building has become a landmark of Colombo.

When the Ceylon University College was established in 1921, the science section of the Ceylon Technical College was transferred to form the Department of Science, at the new University college which was affiliated to the University of London. The Technical College began preparing students for the external degrees in Engineering of the University of London since 1933 as well as for associate membership examinations of the professional institutions of civil, electrical and mechanical engineering.

In 1942 the Ceylon Technical College was separated from the Education Department and was made the Ceylon Technical College Department. Several years later began courses in accountancy and commerce. Soon after in 1950 the engineering courses were transferred to the newly established Faculty of Engineering of the University of Ceylon. In 1966 the engineering technicians courses were transferred to the Institute of Practical Technology. In 1964 it was absorbed into the Department of Technical Education and Training over the next decades the several technical colleges were established around the country and the existing junior technical colleges where upgraded.

Coming under the Department of Technical Education and Training, the principal technical college remained at Maradana, retain the name Maradana College of Technology along with 32 colleges of technology, and technical colleges today come under the purview of the Ministry of Tertiary Education & Training however it is currently under the Ministry of Youth Affears.

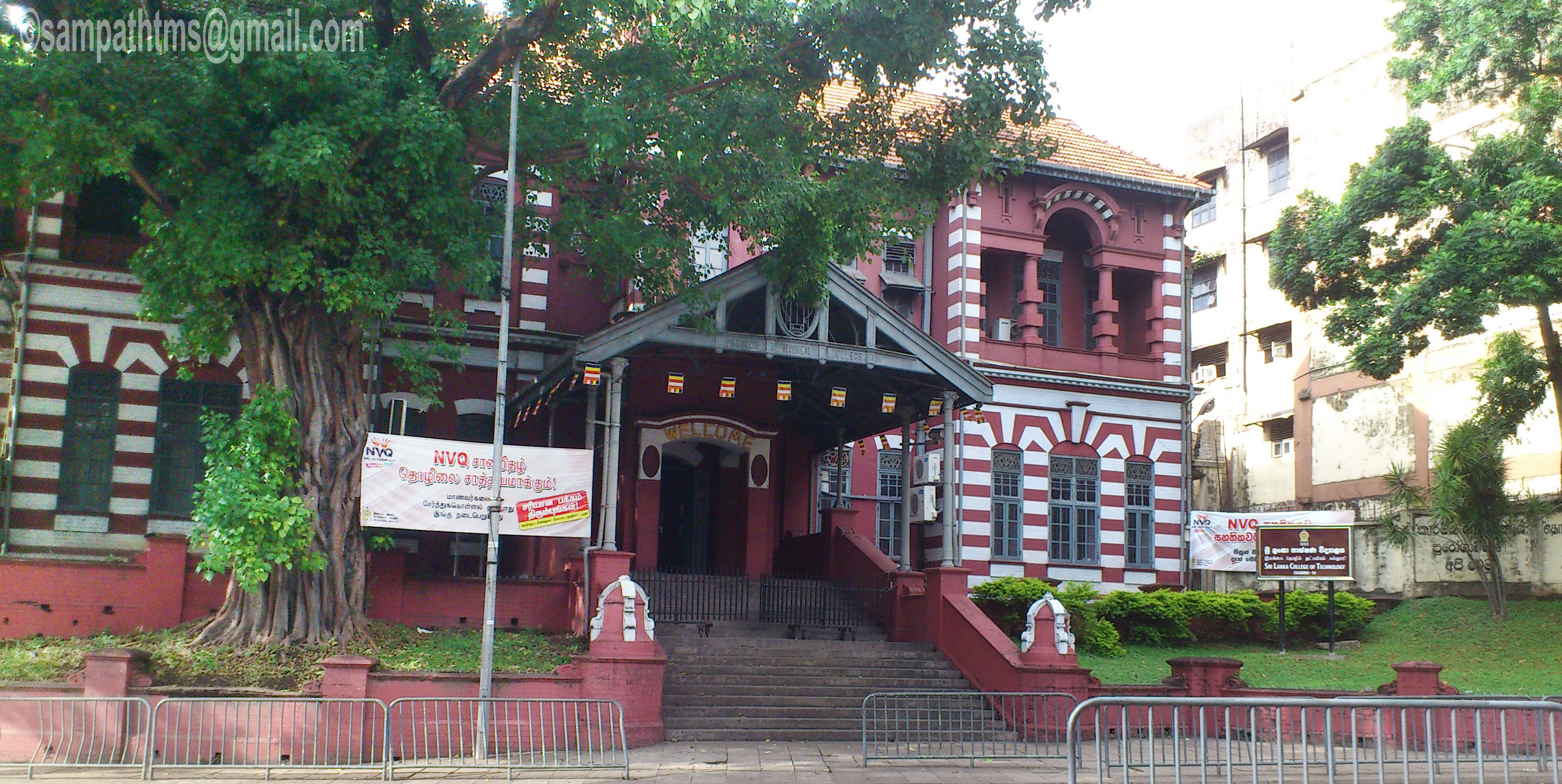
Maradana technical college front view

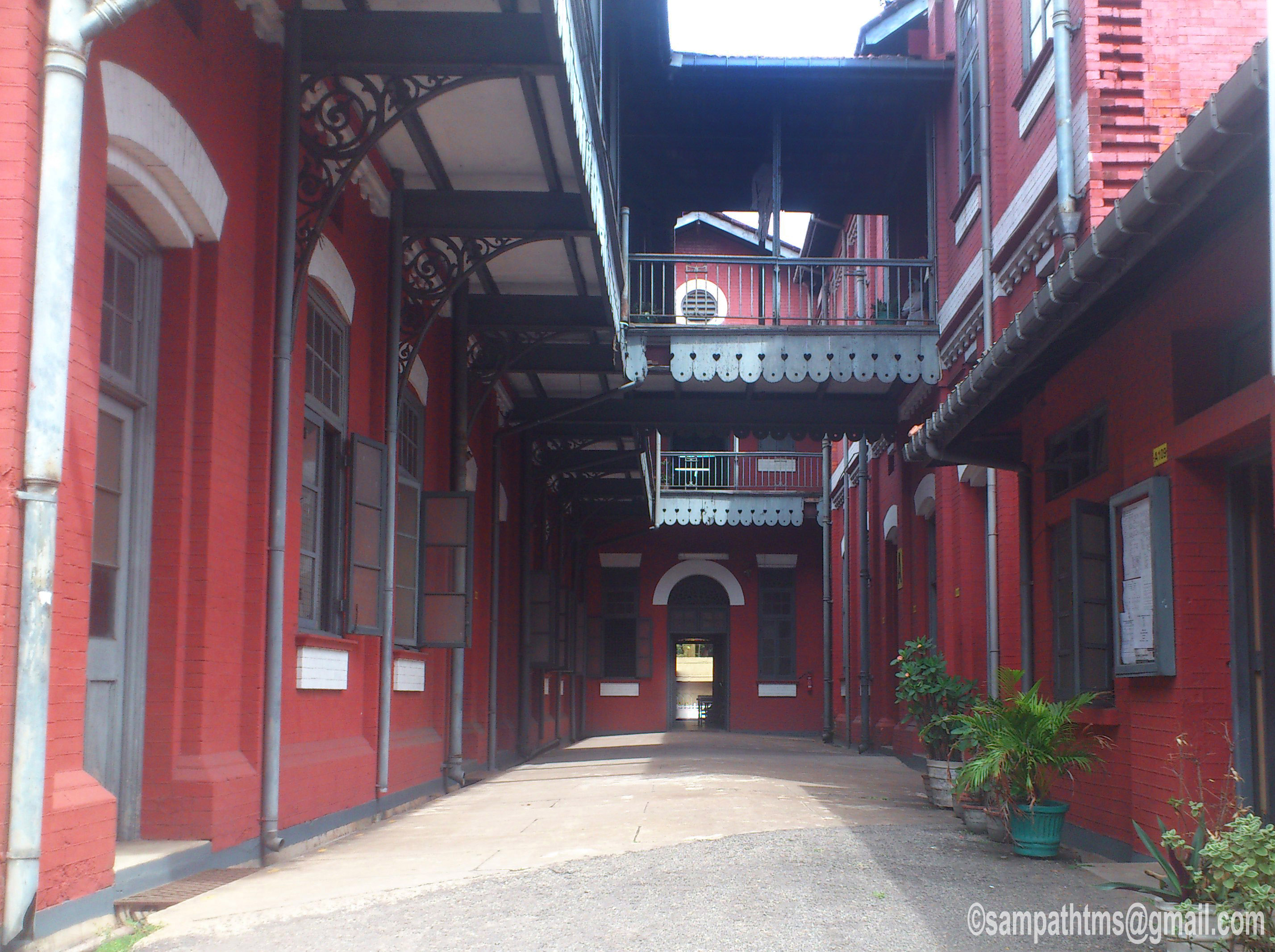
Maradana technical college

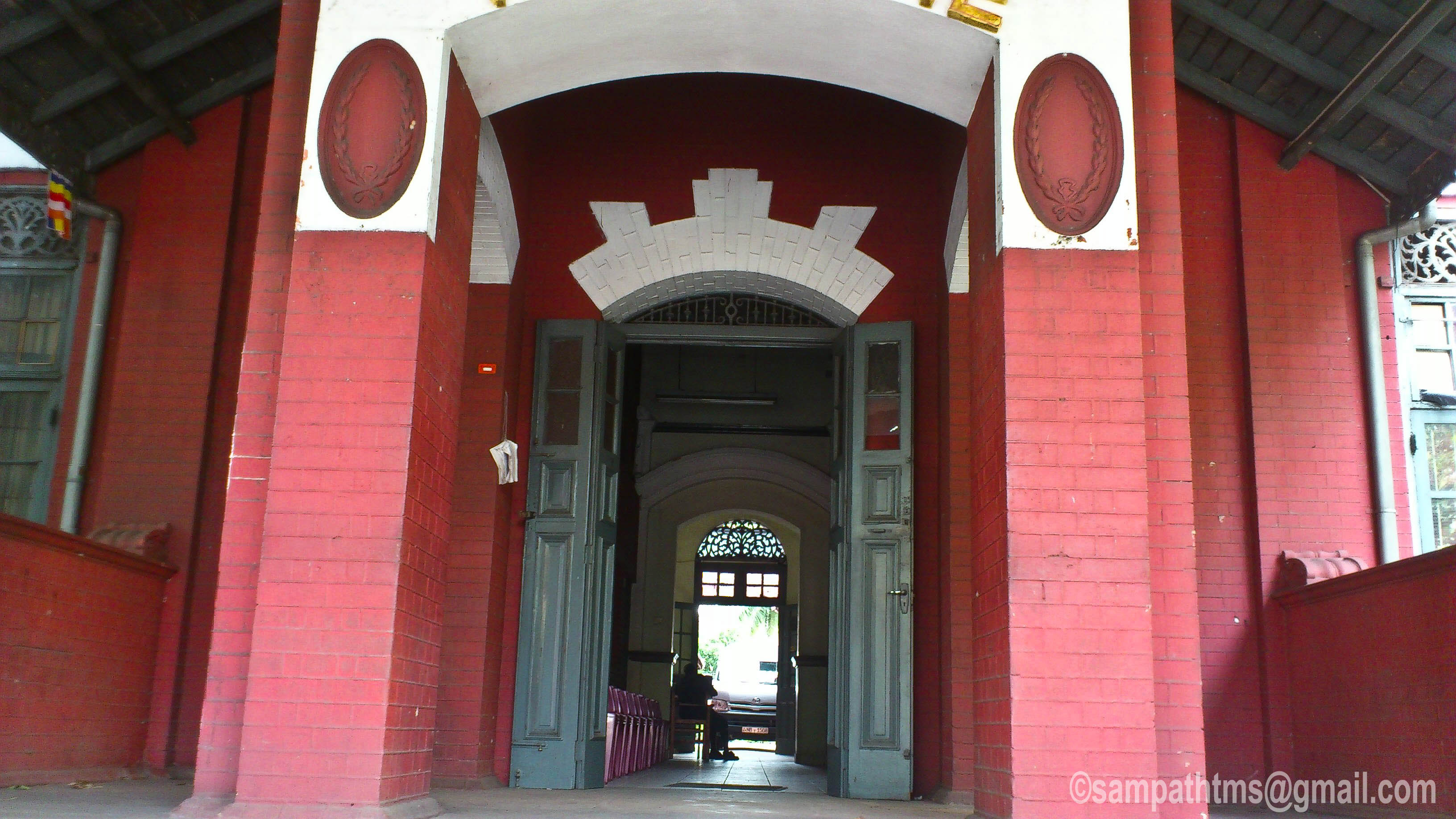
Maradana College of Technology

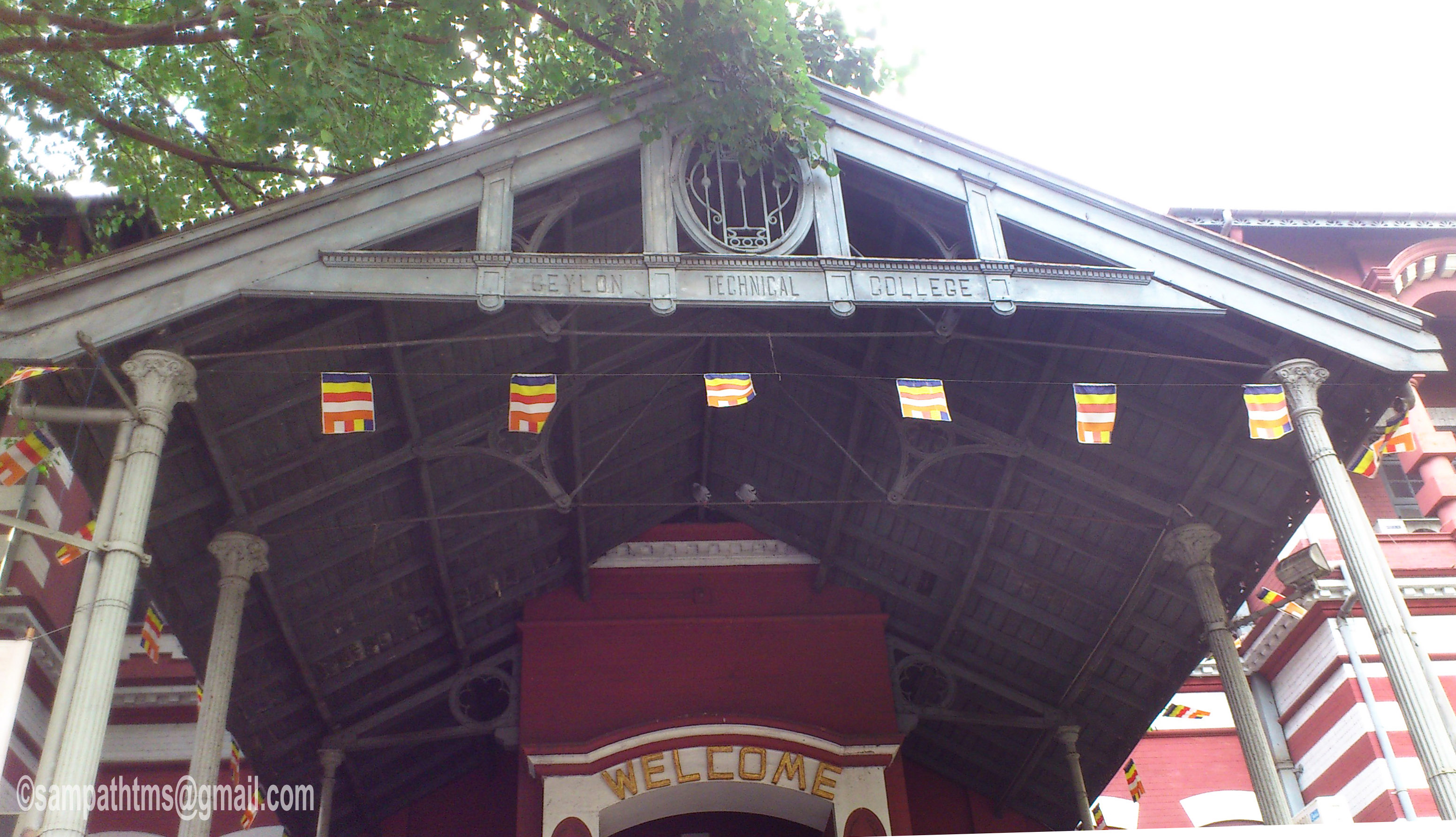
Maradana technical college-Main entrance

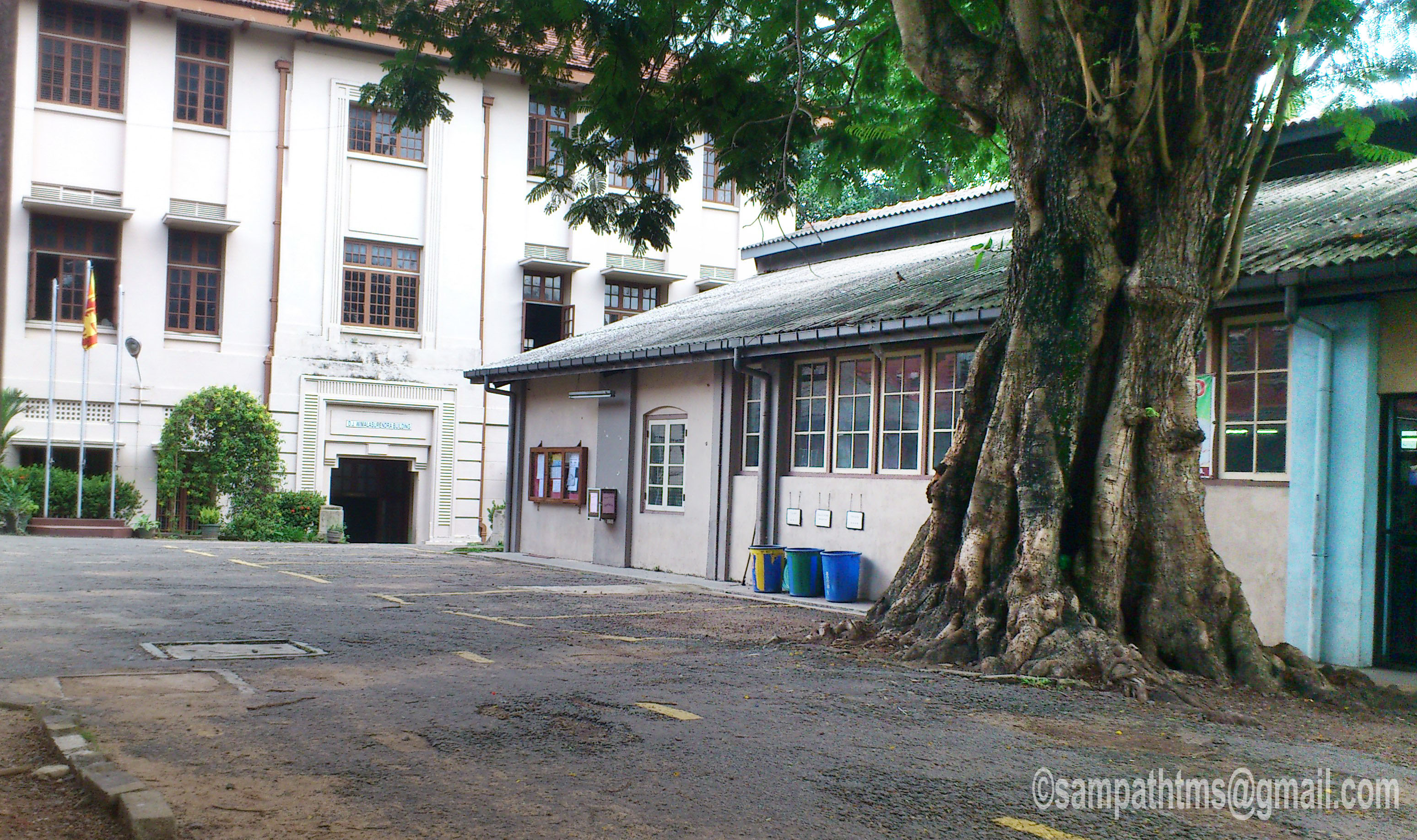
Maradana technical college-canteen

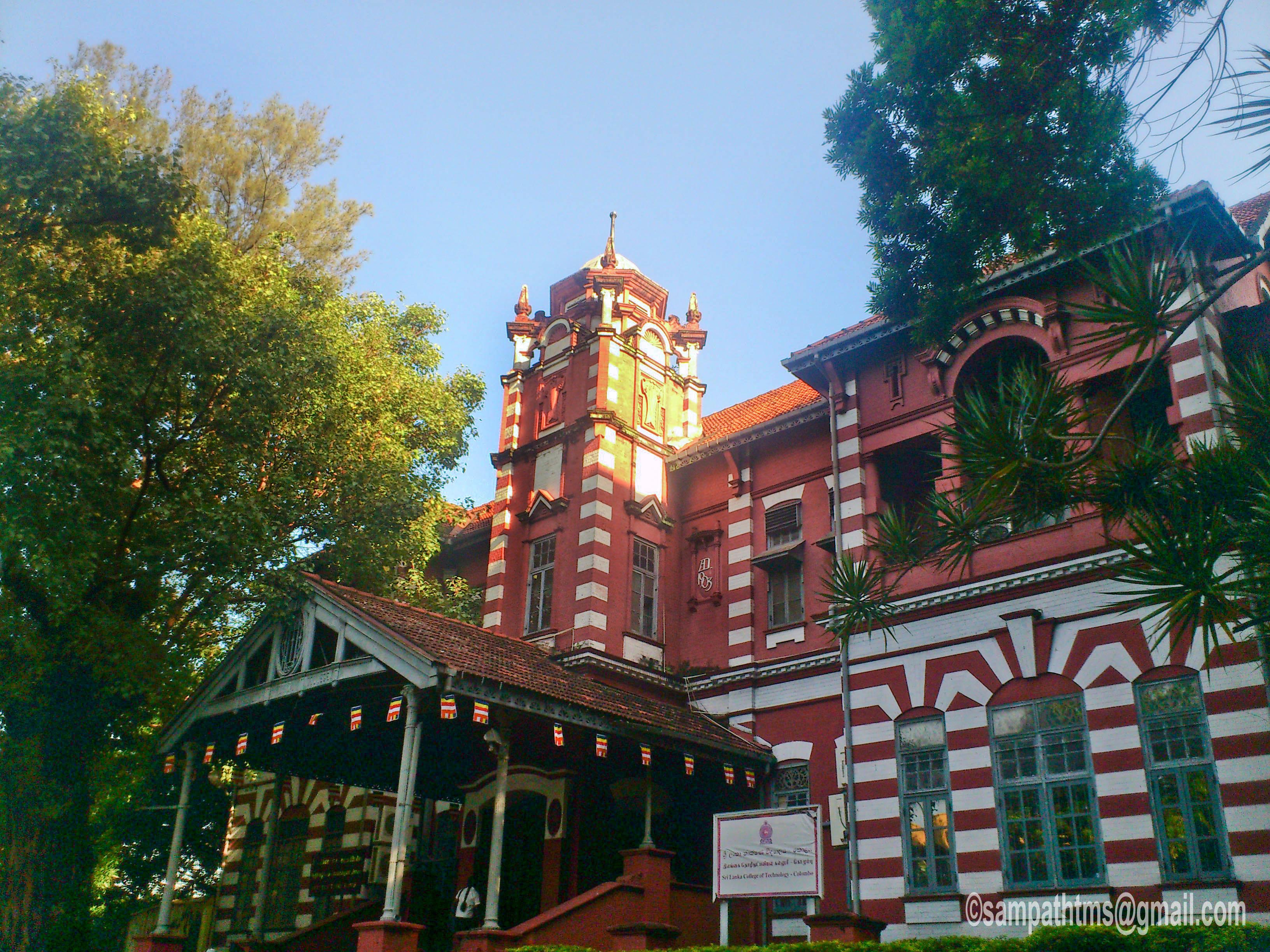
Maradana technical college-front view

== Notable alumni ==
- D. J. Wimalasurendra - engineer, member State Council of Ceylon (1931–35)
- A. N. S. Kulasinghe - engineer, founding chairman State Engineering Corporation, commissioner Colombo Port Commission
- Kanagaratnam Sriskandan - chief highway engineer, British Department for Transport
- K. Aiyadurai - chairman, Jaffna Urban Council (1942–43)
