= E. Arnold (Sri Lankan politician) =

Sri Lankan politician

Honourable E. Arnold MPC

19th Mayor of Jaffna
- In office 26 March 2018 – 30 December 2020
- Preceded by: Yogeswari Patkunarajah
- Succeeded by: V. Manivannan

Member of the Northern Provincial Council for Jaffna District
- In office 11 October 2013 – 14 December 2017
- Succeeded by: Saba Kugathas

Personal details
- Party: Illankai Tamil Arasu Kachchi
- Other political affiliations: Tamil National Alliance
- Ethnicity: Sri Lankan Tamil

Emmanuel Arnold (Tamil: இம்மானுவேல் ஆனல்ட்) is a Sri Lankan Tamil politician, former provincial councillor and the former Mayor of Jaffna.

== Career ==
Arnold contested the 2013 provincial council election as one of the Tamil National Alliance's candidates in Jaffna District and was elected to the Northern Provincial Council. After the election he was appointed to assist the Chief Minister on enterprise promotion and sports development. He took his oath as provincial councillor in front of Chief Minister C. V. Vigneswaran at Veerasingam Hall on 11 October 2013.

Arnold resigned from the Northern Provincial Council in December 2017 in order to contest the 2018 local elections as the TNA's mayoral candidate in Jaffna. He was elected to Jaffna Municipal Council as the member for Passaiyoor ward. He was subsequently elected Mayor when the council met for the first time on 26 March 2018.

== Electoral history ==
Electoral history of E. Arnold
Election	Constituency	Party	Alliance	Votes	Result
2013 provincial	Jaffna District	ITAK	TNA	2,688	Elected
2018 local	Passaiyoor	ITAK	TNA	642	Elected
