= HHR =

HHR may stand for:

- Chevrolet HHR, an automobile
- Haramain High Speed Railway, in Saudi Arabia, also known as HHSR
- Hawthorne Municipal Airport (California)
- Health human resources
- Health and Human Rights
- Heavy Haul Rail, freight operator in the United Kingdom
- Hellingly Hospital Railway, a defunct English railway
- Heritage Hotel, Rockhampton, in Queensland, Australia
- Historical horse racing, a type of gaming device
- Home for Human Rights
- Hridaypur railway station, in West Bengal, India
- Hughes, Hubbard & Reed, an American law firm
- Hydra Head Records, a record label
- Jola-Felupe language, spoken in Senegal and Guinea-Bissau
