= Chevaan Daniel =

Sri Lankan TV news anchor and businessman

Chevaan Devavarathan Daniel
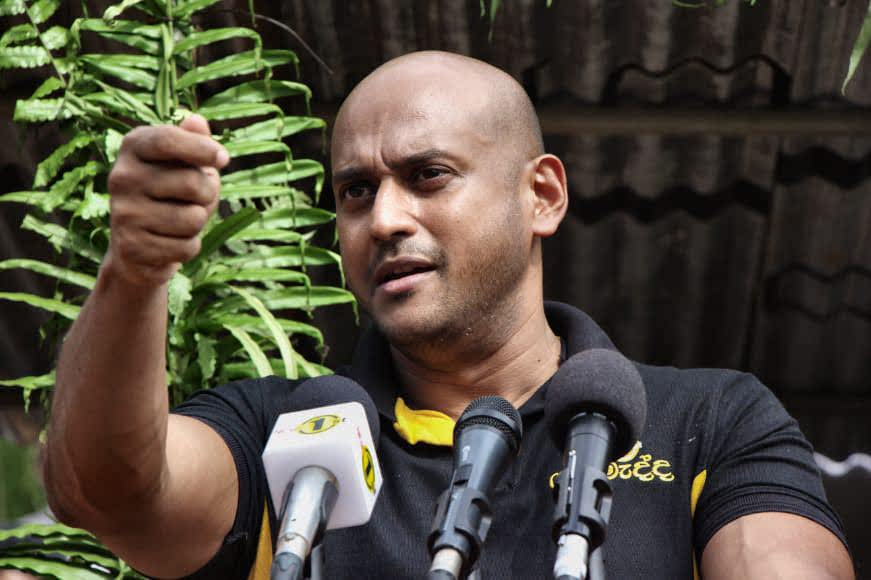
- Born: Chevaan Devavarathan Daniel; 11 May 1978 (age 48); Colombo, Sri Lanka
- Occupation: Group Director - Capital Maharaja Organization (Pvt) Ltd. Vice President - The Asia Pacific Broadcast Union (ABU).

Chevaan Devavarathan Daniel (born 11 May 1978) is a Sri Lankan former TV news anchor.

He was recently elected Vice President of The Asia Pacific Broadcast Union (ABU), becoming the unions first Sri Lankan VP in it's 63 years. https://www.abu.org.my/news/abc-strengthens-emergency-broadcasting-ahead-of-australian-summer-2/

He founded one of Sri Lanka's pioneering tech start-ups in the late 1990s. Today, he sits on the board of the Capital Maharaja Organization, one of Sri Lanka's largest diversified conglomerates. He is also known for his role in 'Gammadda', an award-winning rural development movement.

He is a Fulbright Scholar, Eisenhower Global Fellow (EF Special Award- UTC Fellowship,’17). UN Official Charge de Cérémonie for OCHA- World Humanitarian Summit, Geneva, Head of Sri Lankan business delegation, The Bali Process Modern Day Slavery Summit in Perth Australia, Asia 21 Fellow and Advisory Board Member and a Global Advisory Board member at Brown University – Humanitarian Innovation Initiative. Daniel has been twice selected as Sri Lanka's 40 Under 40 outstanding Young Business Leaders and was the winner of the Junior Chamber 'Most outstanding young person of the year' award in 2008. He is the Group Director of the Capital Maharaja Organization.

He is an A-PAD / IRIA-ASIA- Level II certified Swift Water Rescuer.

In 2019, he was selected by Echelon Magazine to the New Establishment List of 100 Sri Lankan leaders set to lead transitional change in the nation.

== Early life and family ==
Daniel was born to parents of mixed racial heritage. Having begun at several rural schools, he was admitted to S. Thomas' College, Mount Lavinia, in 1988. Chevaan is married to Raaidah Daniel ńee Wahab and together, they have a son, Chelian. He joined Capital Maharaja as a part-time typist in the newsroom.

== Career ==
He is Group Director at Capital Maharaja, which is Sri Lanka’s largest and most diversified privately held conglomerate. He was one of the youngest ever to be appointed to the Main Board of the 80 year old conglomerate.

He has consistently attributed his success to his mentor, R. Rajamahendran, the chairman and managing director of the Maharaja Organization. Early on, Daniel launched eezee2.com, Sri Lanka's first classified advertisement website, in 1998. Daniel launched Sri Lanka's first ever SMS news alert service in 2000. He worked as a media coordinator to the Sri Lanka Cricket board for a period of two years, from 2000 to 2002, including a stint for the ICC.

Daniel also spent a few years working for the Victoria's Secret brand at MAS Holdings, under the tutelage of Dian Gomes. However, he is perhaps best known as an English news anchor on MTV Sri Lanka, becoming a household name in his early twenties.

== Humanitarian work ==
Chevaan spearheads Gammadda, a concept by R. Rajamahendran and perhaps Sri Lanka's largest rural development movement.

Daniel represented the Capital Maharaja Organization, at the World Humanitarian Summit (WHS) – Regional Consultation, which was held in Dushanbe, the capital of Tajikistan, in July 2015. Subsequently he was invited by the United Nations for Global Consultation on Humanitarian Efforts which was held in Geneva, Switzerland, in October 2015. Daniel was the Master of Ceremony for the duration of the WHS Global Consultation. Daniel delivered an official statement at the United Nations World Humanitarian Summit in Istanbul, Turkey in May 2016.

== Education ==
With a Degree in Economics and a Master's in Political Philosophy, he was selected as a Hubert H. Humphrey Fellow in 2010, a part of the Fulbright Programme administered by the US State Department. He was admitted to the Walter Cronkite School of Journalism and Mass Communication at Arizona State University, where he specialized in digital media under Dr. Bill Silcock. While living in the US, he also worked for NBC and MSNBC in New York City.

== Honours and awards ==
Daniel has been widely recognized for his rapid rise in the world of business in general and media in particular. In 2007 he was awarded the Most Outstanding Young Person of the Year award by Junior Chamber International. In 2012 and 2013, he was picked as one of Sri Lanka’s 40 Under 40 Business Leaders by Echelon Magazine. In 2012, Daniel was also selected by the Asia Foundation to its Asia 21 list of young leaders. In 2013, he was awarded the Maharaja Gold Medal for Business Achievement. He, was appointed to the Advisory Committee of the Asia Foundations flagship initiative, Asia 21, in May 2016, a group of global leaders selected from spheres including politics, Science, Business and Social Work. In 2017, he was awarded the Eisenhower Fellowship – Multination Programme and awarded the first Eisenhower Special Award conferred on a Sri Lankan, the UTC Fellowship, 2017. In 2017, he was appointed to the Global Advisory Board of the Humanitarian Innovation Initiative at Brown University.

== Controversy ==
In 2009, after his station was attacked and burned by unidentified gunmen, Daniel was interviewed on CNN about the incident. Soon after, he was placed under an investigation and tipped to be arrested. He was forced to make a dangerous exit out of Sri Lanka but returned within a week, and remained in Sri Lanka turning down many offers for asylum overseas.

In 2010, he was famously 'hauled out' of Temple Trees for standing his ground against the then president, Mahinda Rajapaksa, when warned not to criticize the government.

== Music and poetry ==
An avid composer, singer and lyricist, Chevaan has several English and Sinhalese singles to his name, most of which he has composed and sung himself. He has also composed music for several national programmes including campaigns for peace and reconciliation.

== Other interests ==
An amateur historian, specializing in the Anuradhapura period in Sri Lankan history, he recently published his first book on the subject, Island of Antiquity.

== Public speeches ==
- Daniel, Chevaan (2018). "TCMOL Group Director Chevaan Daniel addresses the 7th Bali Process Ministerial Conference".
- Daniel, Chevaan (2018). "Australian FM Julie Bishop hold discussions at the Bali Forum".
- Daniel, Chevaan (2018). "ශෙවාන් ඩෑනියල් නොකියූ ප්‍රවෘත්ති".
- Daniel, Chevaan (2017). "Key Note Speech, The Junior National Law Conference".
- Daniel, Chevaan (2017). "Chevaan Daniel speaks of a new type of democracy, NITC".
- Daniel, Chevaan (2017). "Foreign Policy Think Tank, BCIS, Colombo".
