= Kerebilachi =

Kerebilachi ಕೇರೆಬೀಳಚಿ
- village
- Country: India
- State: Karnataka
- District: Davanagere
- Talukas: Nallur

Population (2011)
  - Total: 9,754

Languages
  - Official: Kannada
  - Mostly spoken language: Urdu
- Time zone: UTC+5:30 (IST)
- Postal code: 577218

Kerebilachi is a village located in the southern state of Karnataka, India.It is situated in the Nallur taluk of Davangere district and is home to Shanti Sagara, the second-largest built lake in Asia.

== Hosuru ==
Is a joint village about 1 km from Kerebilachi, well connected with district headquarters Davangere 37 km and also taluk headquarters Nallur 13 km. Bus facilities is available throughout the day, both Govt KSRTC as well as Private buses.

== Education System ==
In Kerebilachi, there are 6 government primary schools and 3 private primary schools. In terms of high schools, there are a total of 3 government high schools and 1 aided school. Additionally, there is a Morarji Desai Residential School. There are also two private PU colleges in the area: Sabira PU College for Arts and Usmaniya Science PU College.

== Connectivity ==
Kerebilachi is well connected with roadways SH65 and SH48, nearest railway station is Chikjajur Junction 35 km, Davangere railway station Station 37 km, nearest airport is Harihar Airport (Private), Hubli Airport (Domestic), Kempegowda International Airport bengaluru (International), Mangalore International Airport (International), nearest Port is New Mangalore Port.

== Demographics ==
As of 2011India census, Kerebilachi had a population of 9754 with 4883 males and 4871 females. 95% of population belongs to the Muslim community. Seeing the birth rate now the population might have doubled to 18,000.

== See also ==
- Davanagere
- Districts of Karnataka
