= S. A. Tharmalingam =

Sri Lankan physician and mayor of Jaffna

Honourable S. A. Tharmalingam MMC
- ச. அ. தர்மலிங்கம்

8th Mayor of Jaffna
- In office 28 May 1962 – 4 April 1963
- Preceded by: M. Jacob
- Succeeded by: P. M. Yoon

Personal details
- Born: 23 March 1908
- Party: Tamil Eelam Liberation Front
- Profession: Physician
- Ethnicity: Sri Lankan Tamil

Sanmugam Appacuddy Tharmalingam (Tamil: சண்முகம் அப்பாக்குட்டி தர்மலிங்கம், romanized: Caṇmukam Appākkuṭṭi Tarmaliṅkam; born 23 March 1908, date of death unknown) was a Sri Lankan Tamil physician, politician and Mayor of Jaffna.

== Early life and family ==
Tharmalingam was born on 23 March 1908. He was the son of Sanmugam Appacuddy. Tharmalingam was educated at St. John's College, Jaffna and St. Patrick's College, Jaffna.

Tharmalingam married Sundaravalli, daughter of Saravanamuthu from Kaddudai, in 1941. They had four daughters - Tharmambal, Tharmavalli, Tharmasothy and Tharmarani. Tharmalingam was the paternal uncle of Jaffna MP V. Yogeswaran.

== Career ==
After qualifying as a doctor in 1933 Tharmalingam worked as a Government Medical Officer in Anagoda, Kolonne, Kurunegala, Mannar, Mullaitivu and Rakwana. He became private practitioner after retiring from government service in 1950/51.

Tharmalingam was one of the founding members of the Illankai Tamil Arasu Kachchi (Federal Party) and later Tamil United Liberation Front (TULF). Tharmalingam was elected to Jaffna Municipal Council, serving as the city's mayor between 1962 and 1963. In 1982 several members of TULF, including Tharmalingam, who opposed the party's decision to support the government's proposals for District Development Councils left TULF formed a ginger group called Tamil Eelam Liberation Front (TELF). Tharmalingam was president of TELF whilst Kovai Mahesan, former editor of the Suthanthiran, was its secretary.

In June 1983 several cities in Sri Lanka witnessed violence against Tamils. On 30 June 1983 Tharmalingam and Mahesan sent telegrams to several foreign embassies in Colombo complaining of violence against Tamils in Trincomalee and foreign intervention "to stop genocide of Tamils". The following day TELF staged a hartal in Jaffna against the violence in Trincomalee. Following a train bombing Tharmalingam and Mahesan were arrested and detained in Jaffna using emergency regulations and taken to Colombo. Tharmalingam was held at the Youthful Offenders Building at Welikada Prison. On 25 July 1983 the Black July anti-Tamil riots spread to Welikada's Chapel Ward and around 35 Tamil prisoners were massacred by Sinhalese prisoners, aided and abetted by Sinhalese prison officers. Two days later armed Sinhalese prisoners broke into the Youth Ward and started attacking Tamil prisoners. Tharmalingam survived the massacre and was amongst the survivors airlifted to Batticaloa prison. The prisoners found out that a maximum security prison was being built in Homagama and, fearing a recurrence of the events at Welikada, they resolved to escape. On 27 September 1983 41 Tamil prisoners broke out of prison. Tharmalingam, who was too old to escape, remained behind and was eventually released in November 1983.

Tharmalingam migrated to England in 1984.
