= K. Aiyadurai =

Politician and lawyer in Sri Lanka

Chairman, Jaffna Urban Council

Personal details
- Born: 1892
- Died: 15 August 1967
- Education: Kantharodai English Institute; Jaffna Hindu College; Ceylon Technical College; Ceylon Law College
- Profession: Teacher, Lawyer
- Ethnicity: Ceylon Tamil

Kandavanam Aiyadurai was a Ceylon Tamil politician and lawyer.

== Early life ==
Aiyadurai was born in 1892. He was the son of Kandavanam and Paruvathipillai from Evenai near Punnalaikkadduvan in northern province of Ceylon. He was educated at Kantharodai English Institute (now Skandavarodaya College) and Jaffna Hindu College. He then went to study in Madras from where he passed the First in Arts Examination. After returning to Ceylon he entered Ceylon Technical College and qualified as a science teacher. After qualification he taught at Jaffna Hindu College. Later Aiyadurai entered Ceylon Law College, qualifying as a proctor and taking his oaths in 1923. He then practised law in Punnalaikkadduvan and Vannarpannai.

Aiyadurai married Nagapooshani, daughter of Thillaiampalam and Suntharam. They had five children - Dr Karunanandan, Pathmavathy Jeyaseelan, Leela Balasingham, Justice Sivanandan and Thilgavathy Vijeyaratnam. Aiyadurai later married Manonmani, daughter of Thambimuthu. They had one child - Sivayogavalli.

== Political career ==
Aiyadurai was a member of Jaffna Urban Council for about ten years. He was elected as the council's vice-chairman in 1934 and 1939 and chairman in 1942 and 1943. Aiyadurai was one of the earliest supporters of the establishment of Jaffna Library.

== Death ==
Aiyadurai died on 15 August 1967.
