= Sarojini Yogeswaran =

Sri Lankan politician, Mayor of Jaffna

14th Mayor of Jaffna
- In office 1998–1998
- Succeeded by: Pon Sivapalan

Member of Jaffna Municipal Council
- In office 1998–1998

Personal details
- Born: Sarojini Ponnambalam
- Died: 17 May 1998 Jaffna, Sri Lanka
- Party: Tamil United Liberation Front
- Spouse: Vettivelu Yogeswaran
- Education: Vembadi Girls High School

Sarojini Yogeswaran (née Ponnambalam; also Sarojinidevi Yogeswaran; 1933 – 17 May 1998) was a Sri Lankan Tamil politician and the first female mayor of Jaffna, a city in northern Sri Lanka. A member of the Tamil United Liberation Front (TULF) and the widow of the former Jaffna MP Vettivelu Yogeswaran, she was the first elected mayor of the city in 14 years. She was elected in the local elections of 29 January 1998. She refused armed protection and was shot dead at her home in Jaffna less than four months after her election. A group calling itself the Sangiliyan (or Sankiliyan) Force claimed the killing, and the human rights group University Teachers for Human Rights (Jaffna) (UTHR(J)) concluded that the Liberation Tigers of Tamil Eelam (LTTE) was responsible.

== Early life ==
Sarojini Ponnambalam was born in 1933. She spent her early life in Malaya, where her father worked, and returned to Nallur, Jaffna, after the Second World War as the daughter of a Malayan pensioner. She earned a BA London and taught at Vembadi Girls' High School.

UTHR(J) described her as, in many ways, an ordinary middle-class Tamil woman. Her inherited wealth ensured that she would be relatively comfortable in life. The journalist D. B. S. Jeyaraj noted that the substantial property she had inherited meant she faced no financial difficulty, even after her husband's death. Before her election as mayor she lived in Colombo, and she moved to Jaffna only after taking office.

She entered Tamil nationalist politics through her husband, V. Yogeswaran, who became the TULF Member of Parliament for Jaffna in 1977. The couple had no children.

== Assassination of her husband ==
During the period of the Indo-Sri Lanka Accord, the LTTE targeted the TULF leadership. In 1989, while the LTTE was holding talks with the Premadasa government, a meeting between TULF leaders and an LTTE delegation was arranged at the Yogeswarans' flat in Colombo. On V. Yogeswaran's instructions, the delegation, led by the LTTE intelligence figure Visu, was not searched. During the meeting in July 1989, TULF leader A. Amirthalingam and V. Yogeswaran were shot dead in her presence, shortly after she had served refreshments to the visitors. Police guards who rushed upstairs killed the gunmen.

Jeyaraj wrote that, though she was now alone, she could have led a peaceful, comfortable life had she wished, but chose to enter politics out of a desire to carry on her husband's work. UTHR(J) wrote that witnessing her husband's killing left her with a strong aversion to "gun culture", and that she became disillusioned with armed struggle, believing that the way forward for Tamils lay in renouncing violence, a negotiated settlement and development. The same report states that between the end of 1989 and June 1990, when the LTTE detained many TULF members, she was one of the few people known to be sending information about these arrests out of the country.

== Mayor of Jaffna ==
=== 1998 election ===
When local authority elections were announced for the Jaffna Peninsula, which the Sri Lankan Army had taken from the LTTE in 1995 and 1996, Yogeswaran sought the TULF nomination for the Jaffna Municipal Council. When party colleagues raised concerns about her safety, she reportedly replied, "Don't worry about that. That's my problem." A technical problem with the TULF nomination papers had to be resolved in court, leaving the party only ten days to campaign. She campaigned with few resources while many supporters were afraid to associate with her openly. Notices issued in the name of the Sangiliyan Force warned the public against participating in the elections, and local residents and journalists identified the group with the LTTE. Before the polls, the LTTE journal Liberation Tigers published a threatening verse that mocked her as a woman who had "lived in luxury in Colpetty" and now wanted "a throne".

On polling day a policeman at a polling station in Chundikuli, not recognising her as a mayoral candidate, turned her away, an incident she laughed off. She was elected mayor on 29 January 1998. The election saw a high voter turnout, and a local journalist described the change in public mood from despondency to hope as "a miracle". The Jaffna town commandant, Brigadier Susantha Mendis, who had encouraged her during the campaign, formally handed civil administration of the city over to her after her victory.

=== Tenure ===
Yogeswaran spoke of restoring an "unarmed democracy" to Jaffna. She declined armed security and bodyguards during the campaign and after her election, and turned down a military offer to set up a checkpoint near her residence. In an interview for national television with Bandula Jayasekera, she asked that certain questions be avoided because of threats to her life, and said she was moving to Jaffna from Colombo "with all my pots and pans".

She was outspoken about Jaffna's needs and voiced disappointment with the central government, stating publicly that President Chandrika Kumaratunga had not delivered everything she had promised. Her dealings with non-governmental organisations and foreign missions were beginning to produce results, with funding sanctioned and commitments made for several projects in the city at the time of her death. She was careful not to criticize the LTTE in her public statements.

The Jaffna Municipal Council held its first sitting around April 1998. In mid-April, letters in the name of the Sangiliyan Force threatened senior officials, traders and others against co-operating with the army, and called on all councillors to resign.

== Death ==
On the morning of 17 May 1998, two men called at Yogeswaran's home in Jaffna, where she had been speaking with the deputy mayor. When she came out to meet them, one of the men opened fire on her. Amnesty International reported that she was shot five times with a pistol and died on the way to hospital, while UTHR(J) recorded reports that the weapon was a T56 rifle. The killers escaped through the back of the property.

The same day, a note claiming to be from the Sangiliyan Force was delivered to the office of the Jaffna newspaper Uthayan, next door to her home. It stated that she had ignored the group's warnings to resign and that she had therefore been "dispatched to the world of Yama". On 19 May a second letter in the group's name reached the newspaper. It denied the killing, attributed it to a Tamil party seeking office, denied any link with the LTTE, and described the group as fully endorsing the LTTE's policies. On the same day, an LTTE spokesman in Pungudutivu told an Uthayan staff member that when "selfish people like Mrs. Yogeswaran" sought positions against the people's wishes, it was inevitable that groups like the Sangiliyan Force would emerge and kill them. UTHR(J) treated this statement, published on 20 May, as an admission of LTTE responsibility.

== Reactions ==
Yogeswaran's killing came three days after an LTTE suicide bomber killed Brigadier Larry Wijeratne, a popular army commander in the peninsula. In Jaffna, fear kept most people from visiting her house on the first day. The Eelam People's Revolutionary Liberation Front (EPRLF) was the only group to condemn the murder that day and name the LTTE as responsible, followed by the People's Liberation Organisation of Tamil Eelam (PLOTE) the next day. The Eelam People's Democratic Party (EPDP) condemned the killing without naming the LTTE. On the third day her body lay in state at the Municipal Council, where crowds gathered to pay their respects, before it was flown to Colombo for cremation. At her funeral in Colombo, senior TULF member R. Sampanthan called her death "a great loss to the Tamil people" and said that "war will never bring peace".

The TULF did not publicly name the LTTE. On the day of the killing, TULF secretary V. Anandasangaree told the BBC Tamil service, "I have no authority to say who did it." UTHR(J) reported that a senior TULF member privately told a foreign correspondent that the LTTE was responsible, but that party members later suggested other Tamil groups could have been behind it, while the EPDP blamed the PLOTE. UTHR(J) also criticised the silence of the University of Jaffna and of religious bodies in Jaffna. The office of the Roman Catholic Bishop of Jaffna declined to comment when contacted by The Island, and a condemnation issued by the Jaffna Peace Committee, chaired by the bishop, received little public notice.

The only public protest in Jaffna was a closure of shops organised by S. Namasivayam, vice-president of the TULF's Jaffna branch and secretary of the Jaffna Traders' Association, who had supported her campaign. He was hacked to death with a sword while cycling home on 5 June 1998, after receiving an LTTE letter ordering him to leave public life and pay Rs. 3 million. The only demonstration elsewhere on the island was a picket in Colombo by women's groups. The Movement for Inter-Racial Justice and Equality condemned the killing without naming the LTTE.

A report by Hindustan Times correspondent P. K. Balachandran stated that the killing provoked little revulsion among Tamils, and that a "moderate" Tamil MP had laughed on hearing the news. UTHR(J) disputed this reading, arguing that the muted public response reflected fear rather than indifference, and contrasted it with the turnout of an estimated 25,000 at the 1975 funeral of the assassinated Jaffna mayor Alfred Duraiyappah.

== Aftermath ==
After her death, the deputy mayor resigned and began making statements favourable to the LTTE. TULF member Pon Sivapalan accepted the post of mayor. On 11 September 1998 Sivapalan, Brigadier Mendis and several senior police officers, municipal officials and civilians were killed by a bomb in the ceremonial hall adjoining Nallur Kandaswamy Kovil, which the mayor was using for official meetings. The bomb was believed to have been hidden in the roof of the hall during works carried out while Yogeswaran was mayor.

== Assessment ==
In September 1998, UTHR(J) published a 100-page report on her killing and its aftermath titled A Tamil Heroine Unmourned & The Sociology of Obfuscation. The report described her as a "mother-figure" whose wish to restore normal life and end "gun culture" resonated with the people of Jaffna, and argued that the LTTE killed her because a democratically elected civil administration in Jaffna threatened its claim to be the sole representative of the Tamil people.
