= Nevins Selvadurai =

Ceylon Tamil teacher

Nevins Selvadurai MSC MBE
- நெவின்ஸ் செல்வதுரை

Member of the State Council of Ceylon for Kayts
- In office 1934–1935
- Succeeded by: Waithilingam Duraiswamy

Personal details
- Born: 15 October 1863
- Died: 28 April 1938 (aged 74)
- Education: Jaffna Wesleyan Central School; Presidency College
- Profession: Teacher
- Ethnicity: Ceylon Tamil

Nevins Selvadurai (Tamil: நெவின்ஸ் செல்வதுரை; 15 October 1863 – 28 April 1938) was a Ceylon Tamil teacher, principal of Jaffna Hindu College and a member of the State Council of Ceylon.

== Early life and family ==
Selvadurai was born on 15 October 1863. He was the son of William Nevins Sithamaparapillai, headmaster of Jaffna Wesleyan Central School (present day Jaffna Central College). He was educated at Vaddukoddai Primary School and Jaffna Wesleyan Central School. Aged 15 he joined Presidency College in Madras, from where graduated in science with honours.

Selvadurai married Margaret Annie Papapammah, daughter of Muutusamy Watson, in 1889. They had several children.

== Career ==
After graduating Selvadurai became a teacher at Jaffna Wesleyan Central School. In 1892 he became principal of Jaffna Hindu College, a position he held until at 1926. He was also principal of Trinity College, Kandy for a brief period. In the 1923 Birthday Honours he was made a Member of the Order of the British Empire for his services to education.

== Later life ==
Selvadurai became a member of several organisations after retirement including the Board of Education and University College Council. He was president of the Jaffna Association chairman of the Rural Education Committee.

Selvadurai contested the 1934 State Council by-election as a candidate in Kayts and was elected to the State Council. He contested the 1936 election as a candidate in Jaffna but was defeated by incumbent Arunachalam Mahadeva.

Selvadurai died on 8 April 1938 after a heart attack.
