= M. Srikantha =

M. Srikantha OBE

31st Government Agent for the Northern Province
- In office 1954–1954
- Preceded by: P. J. Hudson

1st Government Agent for Jaffna District
- In office 1955–1961
- Succeeded by: Colonel Richard Udugama

Personal details
- Born: 17 September 1913
- Died: 4 February 1982 (aged 68)
- Education: Jaffna Hindu College
- Profession: Civil servant
- Ethnicity: Ceylon Tamil

Mylvakanam Srikantha, OBE (17 September 1913 – 4 February 1982) was a leading Ceylon Tamil civil servant.

== Early life and family ==
Srikantha was the son of Mylvakanam, a school master from Alaveddy in northern Ceylon. He was educated at Jaffna Hindu College.

Srikantha married Maheswari, daughter of Kasturiar K. Muttucumaru. They had two sons (Yogalingam and Janakan) and a daughter (Malini).

== Career ==
Srikantha joined the Ceylon Civil Service in 1937. He held several positions and served in a number of places. He was Assistant Government Agent in Puttalam (1948); Government Agent of Northern Province (1954); and Government Agent of Jaffna District (1955–61).

Srikantha was made a Member of the Order of the British Empire in the 1953 New Year Honours. He was made an Officer of the Order of the British Empire in the 1955 Birthday Honours.

Srikantha was then Permanent Secretary at the Ministry of Agriculture and Lands and the Ministry of Irrigation and Power. He retired in 1969.

== Death ==
Srikantha died on 4 February 1982.
