= Ramu Manivannan =

He also runs an elementary school for tribal children near Vellore TN

Ramu Manivannan is the former Head of the Department of Politics & Public Administration, University of Madras. He is a Visiting Professor and Community Scholar at the Josef Korbel School of International Studies at the University of Denver. He earlier taught in Hindu College, Delhi University and Department of Political Science, North Campus, Delhi University before shifting to Madras University. He was a Fellow of the United Nations University, Tokyo, Japan. He is the author of the book Sri Lanka: Hiding the Elephant, which deals with the mass murder, the war crimes and crimes against humanity committed by the Sri Lankan armed forces against Tamils.
