= Eliathamby Ambikairajah =

Tamil Australian academic

Professor Eliathamby Ambikairajah AO FIET FIEAust
- Education: Jaffna Hindu College; University of Sri Lanka; Keele University
- Occupation: Academic

Eliathamby Ambikairajah AO is a Tamil Australian engineer, academic and head of the School of Electrical Engineering and Telecommunications at the University of New South Wales.

== Early life ==
Ambikairajah was educated at Jaffna Hindu College between 1959 and 1969. He graduated from the University of Sri Lanka (Katubedda campus) in 1974 with a BSc (Eng) honours degree in electronic engineering and telecommunications.

== Career ==
Ambikairajah worked as a scientific Officer at the Ceylon Institute of Scientific and Industrial Research in Colombo between 1975 and 1977. In 1977 he joined the Philips International Institute in Eindhoven on a scholarship. His studies there earned him a postgraduate degree in electronic engineering in 1978. He joined Keele University in 1979 on another scholarship, graduating in 1982 with a PhD in signal processing. He was a post-doctoral research fellow at the Queen's University Belfast between 1983 and 1984.

Ambikairajah joined the Athlone Institute of Technology in 1982 as a lecturer. He was senior lecturer (1986–88), head of the Department of Electronic, Mechanical and Plastics Engineering (1989–95) and dean of the School of Engineering (1995–99) at the institute. He was a visiting lecturer at the National University of Ireland, Galway between 1985 and 1999. He was an invited research fellow at the British Telecom Laboratories in Martlesham Heath between 1989 and 1999.

Ambikairajah joined the University of New South Wales in September 1999 as a senior lecturer. He became an associate professor at the university in January 2003. He was deputy head of the School of Electrical Engineering and Telecommunications before becoming its head. He has been Director of Academic Studies at the university since January 2000.

Ambikairajah is a fellow of the Institution of Electrical Engineers and Institution of Engineers, Australia, and a member of the Institute of Electrical and Electronics Engineers.

Ambikairajah was appointed as an Officer of the Order of Australia (AO) in the 2026 Australia Day Honours for "distinguished service to tertiary education and research, to electrical engineering, to technology innovation, and to the Sri Lankan community of Australia".
