= Kanagaratnam Sriskandan =

Kanagaratnam Sriskandan (12 August 1930 – 21 April 2010) was a Sri Lankan born British engineer and civil servant. He was the former Chief Highway Engineer, of Under Secretary Grade at the British Department for Transport

Sriskandan received his primary education at Jaffna Central College, and went on S. Thomas' College, Mount Lavinia briefly and completed his secondary education at Royal College Colombo. His father was Dr Kanagaratnam. He joined the Ceylon Technical College to study civil engineering, when the engineering of the Technical College was transferred to the newly established University of Ceylon.

Joining Public Works Department as an Assistant Engineer, he left Ceylon in 1956 and migrated to Britain to specialize in bridge engineering. He was a member of the team that assessed proposals for the channel tunnel, Anglo-French Safety Authority, Council member of the British Standards Institute, Council of the Institution of Civil Engineers. After his retirement in 1988, he served as a director of the Mott Macdonald Group for five years.
