= S. Rajandram =

- Born: 30 November 1903
- Died: 12 September 1965 (aged 61)
- Education: Jaffna Hindu College
- Occupation: Businessman

Sinnathamby Rajandram (30 November 1903 – 12 September 1965) was a Ceylon Tamil businessman and one of the founders of Capital Maharaja Organisation, one of the largest conglomerates in Sri Lanka. His son R. Rajamahendran was also prominent businessman and media personality who went onto serve as the chairman of Capital Maharaja.

== Early life and family ==
Rajandram was born on 30 November 1903. He was the son of Sinnatamby, an employee of the Medical Department in Kuala Lumpur, Malaya. He had his early education in Malaya before his family moved to Ceylon. He was then educated at the Jaffna Hindu College.

Rajandram married Chellammah, daughter of Sittampalam from Kokkuvil. They had two sons (Maharaja and Rajamahendran) and four daughters (Rajalakshmi, Mahalakshmi, Jeyalakshmi and Vijayalakshmi).

== Career ==
After finishing education Rajandram and his school friend S. Mahadevan joined Beer and Co. as guarantee brokers. Rajandram was appointed assistant general manager of the company after it was taken over by Dodge and Seymour in 1935. He became general manager three years later.

After the company ceased trading in Ceylon Rajandram and Mahadavan established several businesses to take over its client base: Mahadavans Limited, Rajandram Limited, Stirling Products and Maharaja Distribution. The Maharaja building in Banshall Street, Colombo was completed in 1953. After Mahadavan died in December 1957 Rajandram took over the management of their three companies (Mahadavans Limited, Rajandram Limited and Maharaja Distributors Limited).

The Ceylonese government restricted imports into the country in 1959. Rajandram established several factories to fill the vacuum caused by the restriction: Parker Quick Ink, Ponds Cosmetic, Chemway and S. Lon PVC). These companies were the forerunners of the modern Maharaja Organisation.

Rajandram was a founder member of the Hindu Educational Society and a trustee of the Maharaja Trust. He died on 12 September 1965. After his death, his sons R. Rajamahendran and Rajandram Maharaja took over the business leadership and administration in 1966.
