= V. Sivasubramaniam =

Puisne Justice of the Supreme Court of Ceylon
- In office 1966–1970

Personal details
- Born: 14 March 1908
- Died: 5 December 1985 (aged 77)
- Education: Jaffna Hindu College; Ananda College
- Profession: Lawyer
- Ethnicity: Ceylon Tamil

Veeravagu Sivasubramaniam (also spelt Sivasupramaniam; 14 March 1908 – 5 December 1985) was a leading Ceylon Tamil lawyer and judge. He was a magistrate, District Judge, Additional Permanent Secretary, Acting Permanent Secretary of the Ministry of Justice and judge of the Supreme Court of Ceylon.

== Early life and family ==
Sivasubramaniam was born on 14 March 1908. He was the son of K. S. Veeravagu, a notary public from Vannarpannai in northern British Ceylon. He had four brothers and two sisters. Sivasubramaniam's brother Dr. Nadarajah was the Chief Medical Officer for Colombo. Sivasubramaniam was educated at Jaffna Hindu College and Ananda College. He was awarded a BA degree from the University of London. He later qualified as an advocate.

Sivasubramaniam married Manonmani, daughter of Dr. Thiyagarajah of Colombo. They had three sons - Dr. Thiagarajah, Yogeswaran and Sivakumar.

== Career ==
Sivasubramaniam was called to the bar on 8 March 1933. He then practised law in Jaffna. He joined the judicial service on 27 February 1941 and served as a magistrate in Matara. He was appointed Commissioner of Assize in 1962. He also served as District Judge, Additional Permanent Secretary, Acting Permanent Secretary of the Ministry of Justice. He was appointed to the Supreme Court in 1966 and retired in 1970.

Sivasubramaniam served as a member of the Law Commission, the Board of Trustees of the Bandaranaike Centre for International Studies, the Board of Management of the Dr. N. M. Perera Memorial Trust, the executive committee of the Alumni Association of Jaffna Hindu College, All Ceylon Hindu Congress, Arumuga Navalar Sabai, president of the Colombo Hindu Education Board and chairman of the Hindu Advisory Council.

Sivasubramaniam died on 5 December 1985 at the age of 77.
