= S. Mahadevan =

- Born: 24 August 1904
- Died: 23 December 1957 (aged 53)
- Education: Jaffna Hindu College
- Occupation: Businessman

Subramaniam Mahadevan (24 August 1904 – 23 December 1957) was a Ceylon Tamil businessman and one of the founders of Capital Maharaja Organisation, one of the largest conglomerates in Sri Lanka.

== Early life and family ==
Mahadevan was born on 24 August 1904. He was the son of Subramaniam, a proprietary planter from Malaya. He had his early education in Malaya before his family moved to Ceylon. He was then educated at the Jaffna Hindu College.

== Career ==
After finishing education Mahadevan and his school friend S. Rajandram joined Beer and Co. as guarantee brokers. Mahadevan was appointed manager of the company after it was taken over by Dodge and Seymour in 1935. He became general manager of the National Carbon Company in 1939.

After Dodge and Seymour ceased trading in Ceylon Mahadevan and Rajandram established several businesses to take over its client base: Mahadavans Limited, Rajandram Limited, Stirling Products and Maharaja Distribution. The Maharaja building in Banshall Street, Colombo was completed in 1953.

Mahadevan was a secretary of the Hindu Educational Society, which built Colombo Hindu College, and a trustee of the Maharaja Trust. He died on 23 December 1957 after a heart attack.
