= R. Rajamahendran =

Sri Lankan businessman and philanthropist (1943–2021)

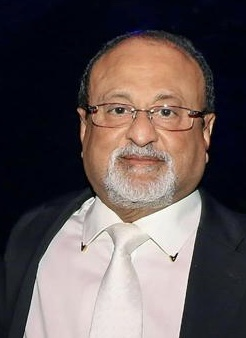
- Born: 19 May 1943; Ceylon
- Died: 25 July 2021 (aged 78); Colombo, Sri Lanka
- Other name: Kili Maharaja
- Education: Royal College, Colombo
- Occupations: businessman, media personality, philanthropist and social activist
- Organization: Capital Maharaja

Rajendran Rajamahendran (19 May 1943 – 25 July 2021) was a Sri Lankan businessman, media personality, philanthropist and social activist. He was nicknamed as "Kili Maharaja" a.k.a. "Kili Rajamahendran".

== Life ==
He served as the owner of Sirasa Shakthi MTV Media Network and chairman of Capital Maharaja organisation. He also served as the Vice President of Sri Lanka Cricket in early 1980s. He was regarded as a media giant in Sri Lanka and was also known for his financial assistance to Sri Lanka Cricket during the pre-test era.

=== Career ===
He pursued his primary and secondary education at the Royal College, Colombo. At the age of 16, he joined the Maharaja Organisation, which was co-founded by his father S. Rajandram. He along with his brother Rajandram Maharaja took over the business leadership and administration following the death of their father in 1966. He was instrumental in the construction of the largest hydroelectric power infrastructure in Sri Lanka and also helped to establish Sri Lanka's first BOI venture during the 1970s. He went on to serve as the managing director and chairman of the Capital Maharaja for more than 28 years. During his media career, he was considered a vocal critic of Sri Lankan governments over the years and also advocated for the rights of people living in the rural areas. He also started the Gammadda initiative through his Capital Maharaja organisation to help people living in the rural areas to fulfill their basic requirements.

He was also credited as an early supporter who helped the Sri Lankan cricket team gain official international test status as well as full member status in 1981 from the International Cricket Council. He worked with veteran politician Gamini Dissanayake to improve the standards of cricket in Sri Lanka and also became the Vice President of Sri Lanka Cricket Board with the support of Gamini Dissanayake. During his tenure as Sri Lanka cricket vice president, he made tour arrangements for the players such as conducting training sessions. He also hired former English cricketer Ted Dexter as a professional advisor to the Sri Lankan cricket team for the historic one-off test match against England at Lord's in 1984. He also employed many Sri Lankan cricketers of the pre-test era, such as Duleep Mendis, Roy Dias, Ashantha de Mel, Sidath Wettimuny and Arjuna Ranatunga, for the Capital Maharaja organisation. He was known as the "Kerry Packer of Sri Lankan cricket".

== Death ==
R. Rajamahendran died on 25 July 2021 at age 78. He served as the chairman of the Capital Maharaja organisation until his death. He had undergone treatment at a private hospital in Colombo after testing positive for COVID-19.

== Legacy ==
On 25 July 2021, one minute of silence was observed by Sri Lankan and Indian players in remembrance of him prior to the start of the first T20I at Colombo.
