= Shanti Sagara =

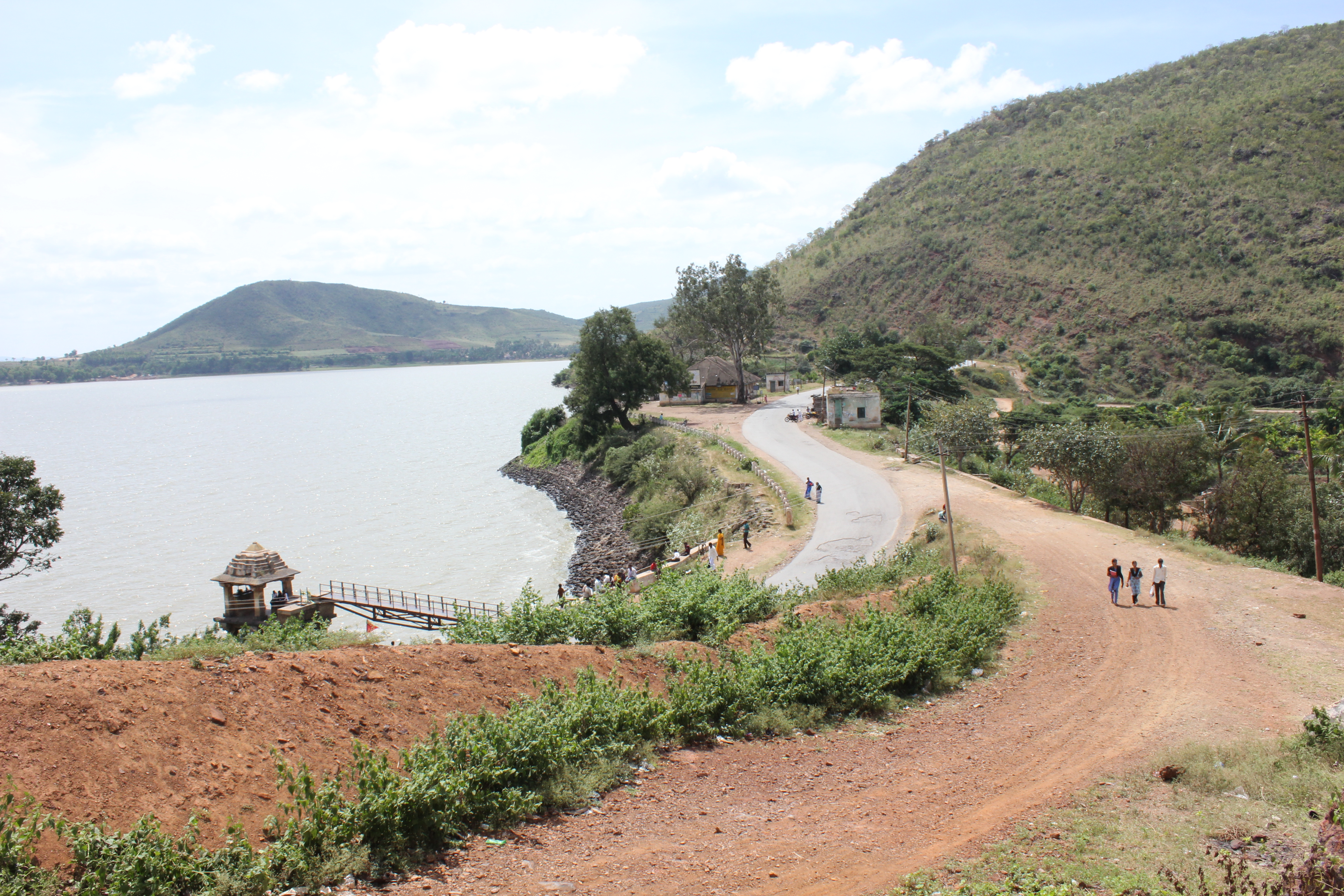
- Shanti Sagara in 2010

- Location within Karnataka
- Location: Sulekere, Channagiri, Karnataka, South India
- Coordinates: 14°7′48″N 75°54′17″E
- Type: lake
- Primary inflows: Haridra, Controlled Bhadra Dam's right bank canal
- Primary outflows: Sidda canal, Basava canal
- Catchment area: 329.75 km^{2} (127.32 sq mi)
- Basin countries: India
- Max. length: 8.1 km (5.0 mi)
- Max. width: 4.6 km (2.9 mi)
- Surface area: 2,651 ha (27 km^{2})
- Average depth: 10 ft (3 m)
- Max. depth: 27 ft (8 m)
- Shore length^{1}: 50 km (31 mi)
- Surface elevation: 612 m (2,008 ft)
- ^{1} Shore length is not a well-defined measure.

Shanthi Sagara, also called Sulekere, is the second largest built lake in Asia. It is located at Sulekere of Kerebilachi, Channagiri taluka of Davanagere District in Karnataka state of India.

== Importance ==
Shanti Sagara tank, created by an embankment with sluice outlets, built in 1128, the tank has a history of 800 years. It took three years to construct the massive tank. The tank, which has a water spread of 6,550 acres (2,651 ha), has a circumference of 30 km (19 mi). It has a total drainage basin of 81,483 acres (32,975 ha). It irrigates 4,700 acres (1,900 ha) of land and more than 1000 villages are benefited by it.

The tank receives the drainage of twenty square miles. All of the drainage pours into the gorge where it is built (the main stream bearing the name of Haridra, a tributary of the Tungabhadra). The embankment is constructed between two hills, and embankment is of no great length; it is around 950 ft (290 m), but it is of stupendous width (Max 120 ft (37 m), min 70 ft (21 m)), height and strength, though not quite straight. The main road connecting between Channagiri and Davanagere pass through on this embankment. It has resisted successfully the floods of centuries, but owing to the great pressure of the volume of the water in tank.

It has two sluices. That to the north is called the "Sidda", and that to the south the "Basava". Notwithstanding the damaged state of the sluices and the great force of the water when escaping through them, the embankment has always remained firm and uninjured, a satisfactory proof of the solidity of the structure.

If required (as during drought) the tank can be fed by surplus water from Bhadra Dam's right bank canal.

== Etymology ==
The name is derived from "Sule" courtesan and "kere" tank. Sulekere renamed to Shanthi Sagara, where "shanthi" is the first name of princess Shantava, who constructed this tank. "Sagara" means Ocean, as this tank is one of biggest tanks in Asia, so the tank is compared to an ocean.

== History ==
The construction of the tank is assigned to 11th or 12th century, and remains are pointed out, said have belonged to Svargavathi, the city was submerged, its king Vikrama raaya, who had no children, adopted the son of gowda of Billahalli.

This youth received the name of Ragi raaya. But a daughter was subsequently born to the king in reward for his devotion to Shiva. She was called Shantava. The king's daughter, who, having formed a connection with some divinity, built, as an expiatory act, the tank, which submerged the town of her father, who had cursed her as a prostitute. Hence the name "Sulekere".

There is stone to be dated Shaka 1311, in the tank.

History also has it that the Lt. General Sir Richard Hieram Sankey, Chief Engineer of Mysore state, once commented during 1856, that the region (where Sulekere once was) was not ideal for the construction of a tank, but was still built, all thanks to the engineering expertise of people of those times. It is indeed remarkable, he commented.

Sulekere tank, 40 mi (64 km) round, which receives all the streams from the south, and from which Haridra issues to the north. The south and west are crossed by lines of hills, as it mentioned in The Imperial Gazetteer of India in 1903-4.

On 22 September 1952 an adult Eel (Anguilla bengalensis) measuring 44 inches was found in a dragnet in the Sulekere reservoir. After the construction of Tungabhadra dam, the migration of the eel from sea to the upper reaches of the Tungabhadra is prevented, on 17 April 1955.

== Drinking water ==
Drinking water is supplied from Shanthi Sagara to Chitradurga, Karnataka Urban Water Supply and Drainage Board (KUWS&DB) has funded ₹ 80 crore to this project.

Presently, Chitradurga city is getting 30 million litres of water a day from the Shanti Sagara Water Supply System. Off-late, there are fears of the lake completely drying up.

== See also ==
- List of lakes in India
- Channagiri
- Karnataka
