= Nallur, Erode =

Nallur
- Panchayat village
- Location in Tamil Nadu, India Nallur (India)
- Coordinates: 11°38′10″N 77°16′38″E
- Country: India
- State: Tamil Nadu
- Region: Coimbatore (Kongu Nadu)
- District: Erode
- Taluk: Sathyamangalam

Population (2011)
  - Total: 8,714

Languages
  - Official: Tamil
- Time zone: UTC+5:30 (IST)
- PIN: 638459
- Telephone code: 91(04266)
- Vehicle registration: TN 36

Nallur is a village in the Sathyamangalam tehsil of Erode district in Tamil Nadu, India. Nallur is located 17 kilometres (11 mi) from Sathymangalam and about 90 kilometres (56 mi) from the district headquarters.

== Demographics ==
According to the 2011 census of India, Nallur had a population of 8714 people and was classified as a gram panchayat. This included 4393 males and 4321 females. The village had an overall literacy rate of 72.68% with male literacy and female literacy standing at 80.85% and 64.37%, respectively. There were around 2586 households in Nallur with scheduled castes making up nearly 19.94% of the total population.

== Schools ==
The Panchayat Union primary school was established in Nallur in 1927. The school today has computer aided learning methods for primary school students of classes between 1 and 5. The medium of instruction in the school is Tamil. In addition to this, Nallur is also home to SRC Memorial Matriculation School that is co-educational with hostel facilities for boys and girls.
