= Nalluru, Roddam mandal =

Nalluru
- Village
- Interactive map of Nalluru
- Location in Andhra Pradesh, India
- Coordinates: 14°02′43″N 77°26′31″E
- Country: India
- State: Andhra Pradesh
- District: Sri Sathya Sai
- Talukas: Roddam

Population (1991)
  - Total: 1,991

Languages
  - Official: Telugu
- Time zone: UTC+5:30 (IST)
- PIN: 515124

Nallur or Nalluru is a village in Roddam mandal in Sri Sathya Sai district of Andhra Pradesh, India.

== Demographics ==
As of 2011 census, had a population of 2,110. The total population constitutes 1,083 males and 1,027 females —a sex ratio of 948 females per 1000 males. 238 children are in the age group of 0–6 years, of which 119 are boys and 119 are girls —a ratio of 1000 per 1000. The average literacy rate stands at 53.37% with 999 literates, significantly higher than the state average of 67.41%.
