= South Nallur =

- city
- Location in Tamil Nadu, India South Nallur (India)
- Coordinates: 11°06′53″N 77°23′51″E
- Country: India
- State: Tamil Nadu
- District: Tiruppur

Population (2001)
  - Total: 30,319

Languages
  - Official: Tamil
- Time zone: UTC+5:30 (IST)

South Nallur is a panchayat town in Tiruppur district in the Indian state of Tamil Nadu.

== Demographics ==
Religious census
Religion	Percent(%)
Hindu	85.52%
Muslim	9.51%
Christian	4.75%
Sikh	0.00%
Buddhist	0.01%
Jain	0.02%
Other	0.18%

As of 2001 India census, South Nallur had a population of 30,319. Males constitute 53% of the population and females 47%. South Nallur has an average literacy rate of 75%, higher than the national average of 59.5%: male literacy is 80%, and female literacy is 68%. In South Nallur, 11% of the population is under 6 years of age.

As per the religious census of 2011, S.Nallur had 85.52% Hindus, 9.51% Muslims, 4.75% Christians, 0.01% Sikhs, 0.01% Buddhists, 0.02% Jains and 0.18% following other religions.
