= Sri Lanka: Hiding the Elephant =

2014 book

- Author: Ramu Manivannan
- Language: English
- Genre: Non-fiction
- Publisher: University of Madras, Department of Politics and Public Administration
- Publication date: 2014
- Pages: 976
- ISBN: 9788192755304

Sri Lanka: Hiding the Elephant– Documenting Genocide, War Crimes and Crimes Against Humanity is a 2014 book by Ramu Manivannan the Head of the Political and Public Administration Faculty of University of Madras. It deals with the mass murder, the war crimes, and the crimes against humanity committed by the Sri Lankan armed forces against the Tamils.
