= V. Manivannan =

Sri Lankan Tamil politician

Honourable V. Manivannan MMC
- வி. மணிவண்ணன்

20th Mayor of Jaffna
- In office 30 December 2020 – December 2022
- Preceded by: E. Arnold

Personal details
- Citizenship: Sri Lankan
- Ethnicity: Sri Lankan Tamil

Viswalingam Manivannan (Tamil: விசுவலிங்கம் மணிவண்ணன், romanized: Vicuvaliṅkam Maṇivaṇṇaṉ) is a Sri Lankan Tamil politician belonging to the Tamil National People's Front. He was the Mayor of Jaffna.
