= Home for Human Rights =

Human rights organisation in Sri Lanka

Home for Human Rights (HHR) is one of the oldest human rights organisations in Sri Lanka. Founded by the late Francis Xavier (LL.B., 1976, Called to the Bars of Sri Lanka and Ontario, Canada) (July 25, 1933 – June 10, 2016), HHR has sought to address human rights violations against the marginalised and the oppressed population of Sri Lanka since 1977. HHR's mandate is to document and advocate against recognised human rights violations as set out in the International Bill of Rights.

HHR's history can be traced back to the activism of Francis Xavier, Kandiah Kandasamy, and Seelan Kadirgamar. They operated under the guidance of S. Kathiravelpillai, member of parliament for Kopay. HHR was converted into a charitable trust in 1991 by Francis Xavier. In 1995, Sherine Xavier commenced her tenure as executive director. Under Sherine Xavier's guidance from 1995 to 2001 and 2006 to 2015, HHR grew to be one of the largest human rights organisations in Sri Lanka. The trust is managed by five trustees.

HHR is located in Colombo and has branch offices in Jaffna, Batticaloa, Akkaraipattu, Trincomalee, Vavuniya, Mannar, Killinochi, Mullaithivu, and Hatton.
