= Pon Sivapalan =

Sri Lankan politician (1952–1998)

Mayor of Jaffna
- Succeeded by: None. Office dissolved.

Member of Jaffna Municipal Council

Personal details
- Died: 11 September 1998 Jaffna, Sri Lanka
- Party: Tamil United Liberation Front

Pon Sivapalan (1952 – 11 September 1998) was a Sri Lankan mayor of Jaffna, who served briefly in 1998 when he was assassinated.

Sivapalan succeeded Sarojini Yogeswaran as mayor of Jaffna after she was assassinated in 1998 by the LTTE. Like Yogeswaran, Sivapalan belonged to the Tamil United Liberation Front. He too was assassinated, on 11 September 1998, when a mine exploded in the Jaffna city council chambers with Sri Lanka Army Jaffna town commander, Brigadier Susantha Mendis and his Principal Staff Officer (PSO), Captain Ramanayaka and Senior Superintendent of Police in charge of Jaffna Division, Chandra Perera. Later it was identified as a Claymore bomb attack and the LTTE was believed to be responsible. Following Sivapalan's death, the Jaffna mayoral office had been officially dissolved and has remained under the purview of the Government Agent of the Jaffna district.
