= Yogeswari Patkunarajah =

Sri Lankan politician

Yogeswari Patkunarajah (Tamil: யோகேஸ்வரி பற்குணராஜா) was the Mayor of Jaffna, Sri Lanka and a member of the United People's Freedom Alliance and the Eelam People's Democratic Party. She was the 18th Mayor of the City and only the second woman to hold the post.
