= Jaffna Municipal Council =

Local authority for Jaffna, Sri Lanka

Jaffna Municipal Council யாழ்ப்பாணம் மாநகர சபை

Type
- Type: Local authority of Jaffna

History
- Founded: 1 January 1949; 77 years ago
- Preceded by: Jaffna Urban Council

Leadership
- Mayor: Vivekanandaraja Madivadani, ITAK since 13 June 2025
- Municipal Commissioner: R. T. Jeyaseelan

Structure
- Seats: 45
- Political groups: Government (19): ITAK (13); EPDP (4); UNP (1); SJB (1); Opposition (26): TNPF (12); NPP (10); DTNA (4)
- Length of term: 4 years + 1 year

Elections
- Voting system: Mixed
- Last election: 6 May 2025
- Next election: TBD

Website
- Jaffna Municipal Council

Jaffna Municipal Council (Tamil: யாழ்ப்பாணம் மாநகர சபை, romanized: Yāḻppāṇam Mānakara Capai; JMC) is the local authority for the city of Jaffna in northern Sri Lanka. JMC is responsible for providing a variety of local public services including roads, sanitation, drains, housing, libraries, public parks and recreational facilities. Established in January 1949 as a successor to Jaffna Urban Council, it currently has 45 members elected using the mixed electoral system.

== History ==
The first organised local government for the city of Jaffna was the sanitary board established under the Sanitary Boards Ordinance No. 18 of 1892. The board consisted of the local Government Agent (chair) and other local officials from the British administration. A local board was established in July 1906 under the Local Boards Ordinance No. 13 of 1898. The board consisted of six members, three official (including the Government Agent who was chair) and three unofficial representing three wards - central, eastern and western. The local board was responsible for establishing the grand bazaar, small bazaar in Gurunagar and the rest house.

A ten-member urban district council (UDC) was established in January 1923 under the Local Government Ordinance No. 11 of 1920. Two of its members were nominated and eight were elected, representing eight wards. The UDC had an area of 8½ square miles and a population of 42,346. The UDC, which was based in a small office at Jaffna Kachcheri, required new premises and the Ridgeway Memorial Hall on the esplanade was identified as a suitable location. Ridgeway Memorial Hall was demolished and new premises, whose foundations were laid by chairman R. R. Nalliah, constructed. The building was formally opened by Governor Reginald Edward Stubbs on 9 June 1936. Subsequently, a town hall was built on the site and officially opened by Waithilingam Duraiswamy, Speaker of the State Council.

A twelve-member Jaffna Urban Council was established in January 1940 under the Urban Councils Ordinance No. 61 of 1939. Two of its members were nominated and ten were elected. The urban council had the same powers and functions as the UDC but franchise was extended to include women. A fifteen-member Jaffna Municipal Council was established in January 1949 under the Municipal Council Ordinance No. 29 of 1947. The fifteen members were elected from fifteen wards. A lack of storage space resulted in the municipal council purchasing premises east of Front Street in 1955. The number of members and wards was increased to 23 in 1968. Mayor of Jaffna Alfred Duraiappah was assassinated by the militant Liberation Tigers of Tamil Eelam (LTTE) on 27 July 1975.

On 10 April 1985 the LTTE attacked Jaffna police station, located next to the town hall, causing serious damage to the town hall. Numerous other municipal council facilities including the library, rest house, open air theatre and grand bazaar were damaged beyond repair during the civil war. As a result of the damage caused to the town hall the municipal council was forced to re-locate to premises on Point Pedro Road on land leased from Nallur Kandaswamy temple.

The Local Authorities (Amendment) Act Nos. 20 and 24 of 1987 changed the method of electing all local authority members from the first past the post using wards to proportional representation using open lists. Mayors Sarojini Yogeswaran and Pon Sivapalan were assassinated by the LTTE on 17 May 1998 and 11 September 1998 respectively.

On 10 October 2012 Parliament passed the Local Authorities (Special Provisions) Act, No. 21 of 2012 and Local Authorities Elections (Amendment) Act, No. 22 of 2012, changing the electoral system for electing local authority members from open list proportional representation to a mixed electoral system whereby 70% of members would be elected using first past the post voting and the remaining 30% through closed list proportional representation. On 25 August 2017 Parliament passed Local Authorities Elections (Amendment) Act, No. 16 of 2017 which, amongst things, changed the ratio between first past the post and proportional representation from 70:30 to 60:40.

== Wards ==
JMC currently has 27 single member wards.

Ward no.	Ward name	VOD no.	Village officer division name
1	Vannarpannai North	J098	Vannarpannai North
1	Vannarpannai North	J099	Vannarpannai North West (part)
2	Kantharmadam North West	J100	Vannarpannai North East
2	Kantharmadam North West	J102	Kantharmadam North West
2	Kantharmadam North West	J123	Kokuvil South East (part)
3	Kantharmadam North East	J103	Kantharmadam North East
4	Nallur Irajathani	J106	Nallur North
4	Nallur Irajathani	J107	Nallur Irajathani
4	Nallur Irajathani	J108	Nallur South
5	Sangiliyan Thoppu	J109	Sangiliyan Thoppu
6	Ariyalai	J094	Ariyalai Central North (part)
6	Ariyalai	J095	Ariyalai Central
6	Ariyalai	J096	Ariyalai Central South
7	Kalaigakal	J091	Ariyalai North West
8	Kantharmadam South	J104	Kantharmadam South West
8	Kantharmadam South	J105	Kantharmadam South East
9	Iyanar Kovilady	J097	Iyanar Kovilady
9	Iyanar Kovilady	J101	Neeraviyady
10	New Moor Street	J088	New Moor Street
11	Navanthurai North	J085	Navanthurai North
12	Navanthurai South	J084	Navanthurai South
13	Old Moor Street	J086	Moor Street South
13	Old Moor Street	J087	Moor Street North
14	Grand Bazaar	J080	Grand Bazaar (Mega Bazaar)
14	Grand Bazaar	J082	Vannarpannai
15	Attiaddy	J078	Attiaddy
15	Attiaddy	J079	Sirambiady
16	Chundikuli Maruthady	J076	Chundikuli North
16	Chundikuli Maruthady	J077	Maruthady
17	Ariyalai West	J092	Ariyalai West (Central)
17	Ariyalai West	J093	Ariyalai South West
18	Columbuthurai	J061	Nedunkulam
18	Columbuthurai	J062	Columbuthurai East
18	Columbuthurai	J063	Columbuthurai West
19	Passaiyoor	J064	Passaiyoor East
19	Passaiyoor	J065	Passaiyoor West
20	Eachchamoddai	J066	Eachchamoddai
21	Cathedral	J075	Chundikuli South
22	Thirunagar	J067	Thirunagar
23	Gurunagar	J070	Gurunagar East
23	Gurunagar	J071	Gurunagar West
24	Jaffna Town	J073	Jaffna Town West
24	Jaffna Town	J074	Jaffna Town East
25	Koddady Fort	J081	Fort
25	Koddady Fort	J083	Koddady
26	Reclamation West	J069	Reclamation West
26	Reclamation West	J072	Small Bazaar
27	Reclamation East	J068	Reclamation East

== Mayors ==
The current Mayor of Jaffna is V. Manivannan of the Tamil National People's Front.

== Election results ==
=== 1983 local government election ===
Results of the local government election held on 18 May 1983:

Alliances and parties	Votes	%	Seats
Tamil United Liberation Front	8,594	88.63%	23
United National Party	830	8.56%	0
All Ceylon Tamil Congress	272	2.81%	0
Valid Votes	9,696	100.00%	23
Rejected Votes	74		
Total Polled	9,770		
Registered Electors	66,921		
Turnout	14.60%		

The Sri Lankan government suspended all local government in the north and east of the country in 1983 using emergency regulations. The civil war prevented elections from being held for JMC until 1998.

In March 1994 elections were held in the east and in Vavuniya in the north. However, elections weren't held in other areas of the north, including the Jaffna Peninsula, because most of these areas were at that time controlled by the rebel LTTE. In August 1995 the Sri Lankan military launched an offensive to recapture the Jaffna Peninsula. By December 1995 the military had captured most of the Valikamam region of the peninsula, including the city of Jaffna. By 16 May 1996 the military had recaptured the entire peninsula. In late 1996 the government announced elections would be held for 23 local authorities in Jaffna District, Kilinochchi District, Mannar District and Vavuniya District but following opposition from Tamil political parties postponed them. On 3 December 1997 the government announced that elections would be held for the 17 local authorities on the Jaffna Peninsula. The Tamil political parties were still opposed to holding elections as "normalcy" hadn't returned to the peninsula. The peninsula was under the firm grip of the Sri Lankan military and civil government had little, if any, role in the administration of the peninsula. The Tamil Tigers were also firmly against the elections being held. Despite these objections the elections were held on 29 January 1998.

=== 1998 local government election ===
Results of the local government election held on 29 January 1998:

Alliances and parties	Votes	%	Seats
Tamil United Liberation Front	3,540	33.31%	9
Democratic People's Liberation Front (PLOTE)	3,182	29.94%	6
Eelam People's Democratic Party	2,963	27.88%	6
Eelam People's Revolutionary Liberation Front	943	8.87%	2
Valid Votes	10,628	100.00%	23
Rejected Votes	907		
Total Polled	11,535		
Registered Electors	82,667		
Turnout	13.95%		

On 1 January 2002 local authority elections were called for the entire country. It was later announced that elections would be held on 25 March 2002 in the north and east, and on 20 March 2002 in the rest of the country. The normal life term of Sri Lankan local government bodies is four years. The life term of JMC expired in February 2002 but the central government extended this by another year, as the law allows. On 21 March 2002 the Election Commissioner announced that the elections in the north and east, except for eight local authorities in Ampara District, had been postponed until 25 September 2002. On 17 September 2002 elections in the north and east were postponed, for a second time, until 25 June 2003. Elections should have been held when the extension expired in February 2003 but in January 2003, following a request from the Tamil National Alliance, the central government instead dissolved JMC using emergency powers and instead put in place special commissioners to administer the local area. In June 2003 elections in the north and east were postponed, for a third time, until 24 January 2004. In January 2004 elections in the north and east, except for local authorities in Ampara District, were postponed, for a fourth time, until 23 October 2004.

On 27 January 2006 local authority elections were called for the entire country. It was later announced that elections would be held on 30 March 2006 across the entire country. The Election Commissioner subsequently postponed the elections in the north and Batticaloa District until 30 September 2006. On 23 September 2006 elections in the north and Batticaloa District were postponed until 30 June 2007.

JMC continued to be administered by special commissioners until the 2009 elections.

=== 2009 local government election ===
Results of the local government election held on 8 August 2009:

Alliances and parties	Votes	%	Seats
United People's Freedom Alliance (EPDP, SLFP, ACMC et al.)	10,602	50.67%	13
Tamil National Alliance (ITAK, EPRLF (S), TELO)	8,008	38.28%	8
Independent 1	1,175	5.62%	1
Tamil United Liberation Front (TULF, PLOTE, EPRLF (V))	1,007	4.81%	1
United National Party	83	0.40%	0
Independent 2	47	0.22%	0
Valid Votes	20,922	100.00%	23
Rejected Votes	1,358		
Total Polled	22,280		
Registered Electors	100,417		
Turnout	22.19%		

The following candidates were elected: Mudiyappu Remediyas (TNA), 4,223 preference votes (pv); Thurairajah Illango alias Regan (UPFA-EPDP), 3,387 pv; Mohamed Sultan Moulavi Sufian (Ind 1), 1,779 pv; Anthonypillai Mariamma (TNA), 1,678 pv; Murugiah Komahan (UPFA-EPDP), 1,573 pv; Vinthan Kanagaratnam (TNA), 1,442 pv; Manuel Mangaleswaran alias Nesapriyan (UPFA-EPDP), 1,394 pv; Meerasahib Mohamed Rameez (UPFA-ACMC), 1,338 pv; Yogeswari Patkunarajah (UPFA-EPDP), 1,250 pv; Pilevian Expedith Cracian (UPFA-EPDP), 1,166 pv; Nadarajah Rajathevan (TNA), 1,118 pv; Benjamin Jacob (TNA), 1,039 pv; Mohamed Merasahib Mustafa (UPFA-ACMC), 1,029 pv; Manikkam Kanagaraththinam (UPFA-EPDP), 1,025 pv; A. Paranjothy (TNA), 1,007 pv; Sutharsingh Vijiyakanth (UPFA-EPDP), 989 pv; Asker Roomi Badurtheen (UPFA-ACMC), 979 pv; Ajmaeen Asfar (UPFA-ACMC), 960 pv; Suvikaran Nishanthan (UPFA-EPDP), 896 pv; Anthonipillai Cilapotasious (UPFA-EPDP), 889 pv; Mariyakorattry Anton (TNA), 881 pv; Arulappu Korneliyas (TNA), 826 pv; and V. Anandasangaree (TULF) 424 pv.

Yogeswari Patkunarajah (UPFA-EPDP) and Thurairajah Illango (UPFA-EPDP) were appointed Mayor and Deputy Mayor respectively. Mudiyappu Remediyas of the TNA was appointed as the Opposition Leader of the council but he crossed over to the UPFA in June 2011.

Suvikaran Nishanthan (UPFA-EPDP) ceased to be member of JMC in January 2012 after ceasing to be a member of the UPFA. He was replaced by Selvarasah Iramanan (UPFA). Thurairajah Illango (UPFA-EPDP) resigned from being Deputy Mayor and was replaced by Meerasahib Mohamed Rameez (UPFA-ACMC).

=== 2018 local government election ===
Results of the local government election held on 8 February 2018:

Alliances and parties	Votes	%	Seats		
Alliances and parties	Votes	%	Ward	PR	Total
Tamil National Alliance (ITAK, PLOTE, TELO)	14,424	35.76%	14	2	16
Tamil National People's Front (ACTC)	12,020	29.80%	9	4	13
Eelam People's Democratic Party	8,671	21.50%	2	8	10
United National Front (UNP, SLMC, ACMC et al.)	2,423	6.01%	1	2	3
Sri Lanka Freedom Party	1,479	3.67%	0	2	2
Tamil United Liberation Front (TULF, EPRLF)	1,071	2.66%	1	0	1
Janatha Vimukthi Peramuna	242	0.60%	0	0	0
Valid Votes	40,330	100.00%	27	18	45
Rejected Votes	586				
Total Polled	40,916				
Registered Electors	56,245				
Turnout	72.75%				

Results by ward:

Ward no.	Ward name	TNA	TNPF	EPDP	UNF	SLFP	TULF/ EPRLF	JVP	Valid Votes	Rejected Votes	Total Polled
1	Vannarpannai North	602	607	188	21	23	15	3	1,459	18	1,477
2	Kantharmadam North West	787	664	264	40	40	40	4	1,839	32	1,871
3	Kantharmadam North East	401	345	81	283	49	8	2	1,169	20	1,189
4	Nallur Irajathani	834	742	273	42	106	41	6	2,044	29	2,073
5	Sangiliyan Thoppu	705	622	215	162	51	41	4	1,800	20	1,820
6	Ariyalai	561	588	215	42	252	15	20	1,693	26	1,719
7	Kalaigakal	144	351	156	266	124	8	71	1,120	12	1,132
8	Kantharmadam South	401	535	72	111	25	10	10	1,164	15	1,179
9	Iyanar Kovilady	488	666	144	269	35	20	2	1,624	17	1,641
10	New Moor Street	246	40	182	42	34	9	0	553	7	560
11	Navanthurai North	524	369	324	32	2	10	0	1,261	74	1,335
12	Navanthurai South	320	315	429	43	5	2	3	1,117	19	1,136
13	Old Moor Street	568	109	315	598	120	9	6	1,725	23	1,748
14	Grand Bazaar	504	388	352	45	20	28	11	1,348	9	1,357
15	Attiaddy	478	479	432	25	42	12	2	1,470	16	1,486
16	Chundikuli Maruthady	595	529	249	10	88	12	2	1,485	19	1,504
17	Ariyalai West	519	562	121	16	76	14	6	1,314	21	1,335
18	Columbuthurai	830	820	724	27	49	191	30	2,671	38	2,709
19	Passaiyoor	642	231	563	45	1	8	0	1,490	12	1,502
20	Eachchamoddai	389	615	225	65	20	24	3	1,341	14	1,355
21	Cathedral	289	318	141	72	15	145	8	988	6	994
22	Thirunagar	55	22	175	1	23	311	2	589	9	598
23	Gurunagar	631	353	464	10	37	22	16	1,533	23	1,556
24	Jaffna Town	596	513	387	15	30	21	11	1,573	19	1,592
25	Koddady Fort	607	314	591	102	167	14	9	1,804	37	1,841
26	Reclamation West	1,123	521	576	31	29	11	4	2,295	23	2,318
27	Reclamation East	585	402	813	8	16	30	7	1,861	28	1,889
Total		14,424	12,020	8,671	2,423	1,479	1,071	242	40,330	586	40,916

The following candidates were elected: Jesurajah Mary Anjala (TNA-Gurunagar), Paramalingam Anushiya (EPDP-PR), E. Arnold (TNA-ITAK-Passaiyoor), Mahalingam Arulkumaran (TNA-Grand Bazaar), Necolas Mariyathas Balachandran (TNA-Navanthurai North), Flavian Expedith Crasian (TNA-Reclamation West), Solomon Cyril (TNA-Chundikuli Maruthady), Crasian Damian (EPDP-PR), Thurairajah Eesan (TNA-TELO-Columbuthurai), Thurairasa Ilango (EPDP-PR), Likori Clement Jeyaseelan (TNPF-Cathedral), Rajaratnam Kanesarajah (TNPF-Vannarpannai North), Vaithilingam Kirubakaran (TNPF-Ariyalai West), Karthikesu Velum Mayilum Kugenthiran (EPDP-PR), Sinnathurai Kulenthirarajah (UNF-PR), Nadarajah Logathayalan (TNA-PR), Vishvalingam Manivannan (TNPF-PR), Mahenthiran Mayooran (TNPF-Attiaddy), Jeyanthini Nageswaran (EPDP-PR), Muththu Muhammathu Muhammathu Nibahir (TNA-New Moor Street), Kathiravel Niththiyananthan (TNA-Jaffna Town), Kachcha Mohamed Mahamed Niyas (UNF-Old Moor Street), Subajini Antony Panadsha (TNPF-PR), Varatharajan Partheepan (TNPF-Kantharmadam South), Balasubramaniam Pathmamurali (TNPF-Ariyalai), Yogeswari Patkunarajah (EPDP-PR), Neekilapillai Philiph (EPDP-Navanthurai South), Nalina Premlal (TNA-PR), Jeyakkumar Rajeevkanth (TNPF-Kalaigakal), Ramalingam Rakini (TNA-Nallur Irajathani), Mudiyappu Remidius (EPDP-PR), Sebamalaimuththu Sathiyasekaran (EPDP-Reclamation East), Ramasamy Chettiyar Selvavadivel (EPDP-PR), Balasingam Shantharuban (SLFP-PR), Nagarasa Srikaran (SLFP-PR), Suganthini Srikaran (TNPF-PR), Subramaniyam Subatheesh (TNA-Kantharmadam North East), Ajantha Thanbalasingam (TNPF-PR), Nagalingam Thanenthiran (TNA-Koddady Fort), Sivakanthan Thanujan (TNPF-Iyanar Kovilady), Paramalingam Tharshananth (TNA-Kantharmadam North West), Mathivathani Vivekanantharasa (TNA-Sangiliyan Thoppu), Sutharsing Vijayakanth (TULF/EPRLF-Thirunagar), Vicneswaralingam Vijayathadshani (UNF-PR) and Ratnasingam Yenan (TNPF-Eachchamoddai).

E. Arnold (TNA) and Thurairajah Eesan (TNA) were elected Mayor and Deputy Mayor respectively when the council met for the first time on 26 March 2018.

=== 2025 local government election ===
Results of the local government election held on 6 May 2025.

Alliances and parties	Votes	%	Seats			
Alliances and parties	Votes	%	Ward	PR	Total	+/-
Ilankai Tamil Arasu Kachchi	10,370	29.63%	10	3	13	▼3
Tamil National People's Front (ACTC)	9,124	26.07%	11	1	12	▼1
National People's Power (JVP)	7,702	22.01%	4	6	10	▲10
Eelam People's Democratic Party	3,567	10.19%	0	4	4	▼6
Democratic Tamil National Alliance (PLOTE, TELO, EPRLF)	3,076	8.79%	2	2	4	▲4
United National Party	587	1.68%	0	1	1	▼2
Samagi Jana Balawegaya	464	1.33%	0	1	1	▲1
Sri Lanka Podujana Peramuna	103	0.29%	0	0	0	Steady
Total	34,993	100.00%	27	18	45	0
Valid votes	34,993	98.69%				
Rejected votes	466	1.31%				
Total votes	35,459	100.00%				
Registered voters/turnout	63,045	56.24%				

Results by ward:

Ward no.	Ward name	ITAK	TNPF	NPP	EPDP	DTNA	UNP	SJB	SLPP	Valid Votes
1	Vannarpannai North	410	453	259	29	17	5	2	3	1,178
2	Kantharmadam North West	241	452	352	37	481	8	4	5	1,580
3	Kantharmadam North East	165	412	295	16	41	246	5	4	1,184
4	Nallur Irajathani	492	522	319	68	146	16	5	2	1,578
5	Sangiliyan Thoppu	627	388	393	37	120	9	7	5	1,586
6	Ariyalai	232	466	364	332	36	4	17	4	1,455
7	Kalaigakal	179	252	202	123	150	5	143	3	1,057
8	Kantharmadam South	222	325	257	34	46	13	3	2	902
9	Iyanar Kovilady	254	456	317	36	46	170	11	16	1,306
10	New Moor Street	108	245	68	177	17	2	17	17	651
11	Navanthurai North	437	844	61	23	6	3	16	8	1,398
12	Navanthurai South	507	115	95	114	90	1	19	2	943
13	Old Moor Street	761	217	154	341	63	36	89	2	1,663
14	Grand Bazaar	167	319	320	167	70	19	12	2	909
15	Attiaddy	223	346	420	134	126	9	12	3	1,273
16	Chundikuli Maruthady	269	386	317	67	83	0	5	1	1,128
17	Ariyalai West	244	396	411	25	56	3	8	0	1,146
18	Columbuthurai	496	428	602	440	490	5	14	2	2,477
19	Passaiyoor	356	258	339	175	50	1	4	1	1,184
20	Eachchamoddai	403	379	220	64	47	3	3	3	1,122
21	Cathedral	409	185	230	42	22	5	4	3	900
22	Thirunagar	80	21	52	131	185	1	1	1	472
23	Gurunagar	554	150	340	135	54	3	27	2	1,265
24	Jaffna Town	294	604	227	63	83	1	5	1	1,278
25	Koddady Fort	809	209	196	287	115	8	14	5	1,643
26	Reclamation West	714	169	552	137	120	4	9	4	1,709
27	Reclamation East	717	127	340	333	316	7	8	2	1,850
Total		10,370	9,124	7,702	3,567	3,076	587	464	103	34,993
