= Mary Elizabeth MacCallum Scott =

Canadian physician and medical missionary

Mary Elizabeth Maccallum Scott
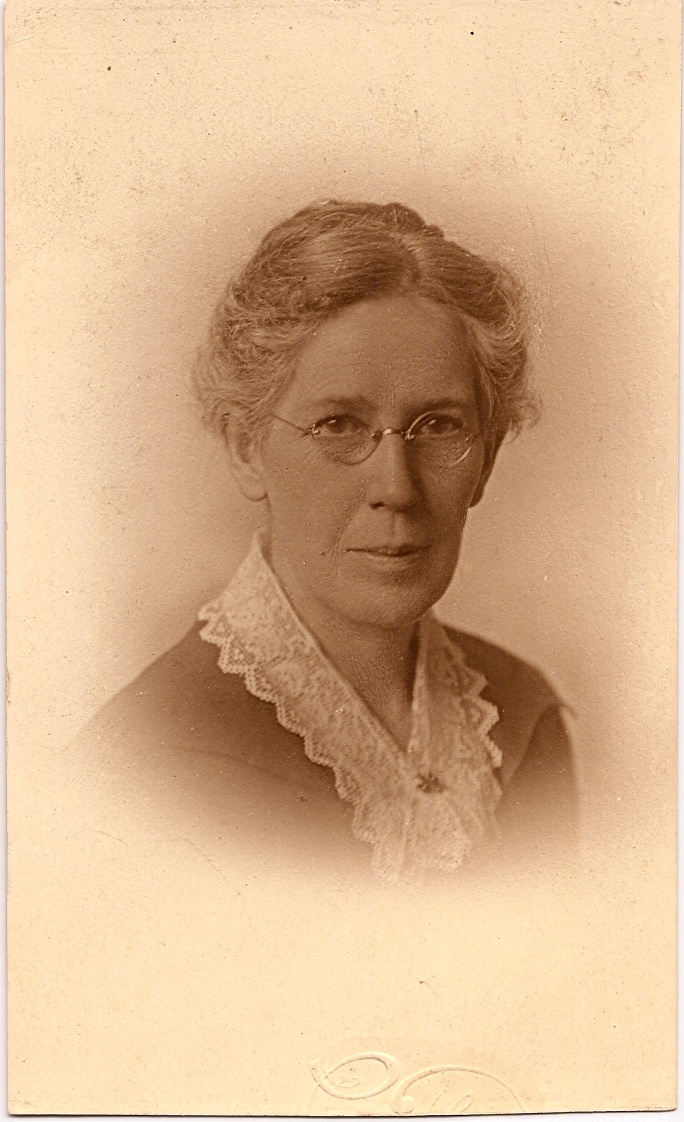
- Maccallum Scott in 1910
- Born: Mary Elizabeth Maccallum; 1865; Martintown, Ontario, Canada
- Died: August 7, 1941 (aged 75–76); Tuckahoe, Westchester County, New York
- Occupations: Doctor, medical missionary

Mary Elizabeth MacCallum Scott (c. 1865 – 27 August 1941) was a Canadian physician and Christian medical missionary who spent twenty years in Ceylon (now Sri Lanka). She was the first female doctor to serve in Jaffna, Ceylon. Scott started the first nursing school in Ceylon at Manipay and her training of women nurses was considered by historians to be “revolutionary” at the time.

== Early life and education ==
Mary Elizabeth MacCallum Scott was born in Martintown, Ontario, Canada in 1865. She was raised in a Christian household. Scott was the daughter of the Rev. Daniel MacCallum, a Congregational minister, and Jeanette MacEwen MacCallum. She was trained as a teacher and then a nurse, graduating in 1886 from Farrand Training School, Harper Hospital in Detroit, Michigan. She then attended Queens University Medical School in Kingston, Ontario, and completed her medical training in New York at Belleview Hospital. She earned her M.D. and became a doctor in preparation for entering the missionary field.

== Family and personal life ==
Mary Elizabeth MacCallum married Thomas Beckett Scott, who was educated in the Arts, Theology, and Medicine at Queens University in Kingston, Ontario. They had seven children, five of whom survived to adulthood: Helen H. Scott, born in 1899; Harold G. Scott born in June 1902; Marjorie I. Scott born in 1904; Katharine L. Scott was born in 1907 (married to Walter Tandy Murch); and Winifred E. Miller was born in November 1909. The Scotts’ son, Percy Scott, was born in 1900 and died in 1902 from an illness. Another son, Arthur, also died at a very young age from an illness.

Though the Scotts were originally from Canada, they eventually retired in the United States.

== Missionary work ==
=== Medical mission in Ceylon (1893–1913) ===
In 1893, Scott and her husband were sent by the American Board of Commissioners for Foreign Missions (ABCFM) to Manipay, Sri Lanka during the period when Sri Lanka was still the British colony of Ceylon. They spent many years in the northern province of Jaffna (1893–1913) as part of the American Ceylon Mission (ACM). Samuel Fisk Green had earlier founded Sri Lanka's first medical hospital and school, but he had left in 1873. During the 20 years that followed, the Mission Hospital had been looked after by the local graduates of the Medical School. The arrival of the Scotts in 1893 enhanced the level of medical care and education in the area and they reopened the medical ward in Manipay. The Scotts also re-named the General Mission Hospital as the Green Memorial Hospital, after its original founder.

The Scotts served as joint directors of the Green Memorial Hospital until 1913 as well as consulting physicians for both the Green Memorial Hospital and the McLeod Hospital. When Green Memorial Hospital was completed, it had accommodations for 70 patients and an operating room. The McLeod Hospital for women and children at Inuvil was also enlarged. Under the Scotts’ supervision, Manipay Hospital recorded significant growth between 1893 and 1898. In 1898 the Women’s Medical Mission started its work and Scott’s medical mission also made contributions to the advancement of education for women, especially after the arrival of Isabella Curr, from Scotland.

In 1902, the Scotts went on furlough due to Thomas Scott’s health concerns and Curr supervised the hospital in Manipay when the Scotts were away. Curr also took charge of the McLeod Hospital for Women and Children at Inuvil. The McLeod Hospital, Inuvil, had been established as a hospital for women and children through the effort of two missionary sisters Mary and Margaret Leitch. Scott made sure that a new Maternity Ward was opened at Inuvil in 1911 and both she and Curr trained many nurses in Jaffna. Scott, herself a trained nurse as well as a doctor, began the training of young Tamil Christian women as nurses and midwives in 1894. The training of small numbers of female nurses was deemed rather radical at the time and nursing became one of the first professions for women in Jaffna.

By 1897, the five large new buildings of the Woman's Medical Mission, the Mission House, the Nurses Training School, the Medical and Surgical Wards, and the Dispensary, together with the necessary outbuildings, were all well established. The Woman's Medical Mission in Jaffna, Ceylon, even sent out an ad regarding an opening for a female physician associate who would work with Curr. The ad affirmed that all the buildings were completed and ready for use with accommodation for forty in-patients. The training school accommodated eighteen nurses and a matron. “Rev. T. B. Scott, M.D., and Mrs. T. B. Scott, M.D.”, were in charge of the General Medical Mission and were acting as consulting physicians.

By 1904, Scott was not only assisting in the medical work, training nurses but she was also in charge of the Biblewoman of the Station. Thomas Scott was the Secretary of the Mission, and had charge of the Green Memorial Hospital, the dispensary and of the Manipay station.

=== Return ===
On their return from Ceylon to the United States in 1913, both Scotts were placed in charge of the Walker Missionary Home in Auburndale, Massachusetts; they eventually retired in 1925.

== Death and legacy ==
Scott retired as a medical missionary and died a widow at the age of 76 on August 27, 1941, in Tuckahoe, Westchester County, New York. She died of natural causes.

Scott is known for being the first female doctor to serve in Jaffna. She impacted medical education, enhanced medical facilities, and started the first nursing school at Manipay – nearly 70 years before the present nursing school in Jaffna was established. She left behind a legacy of women who were well trained medical professionals. Because of Scott’s training, nursing and midwifery were considered honorable professions where once they had been considered unsuited for “decent” educated women.
