= Nancy Ganz =

Entrepreneur

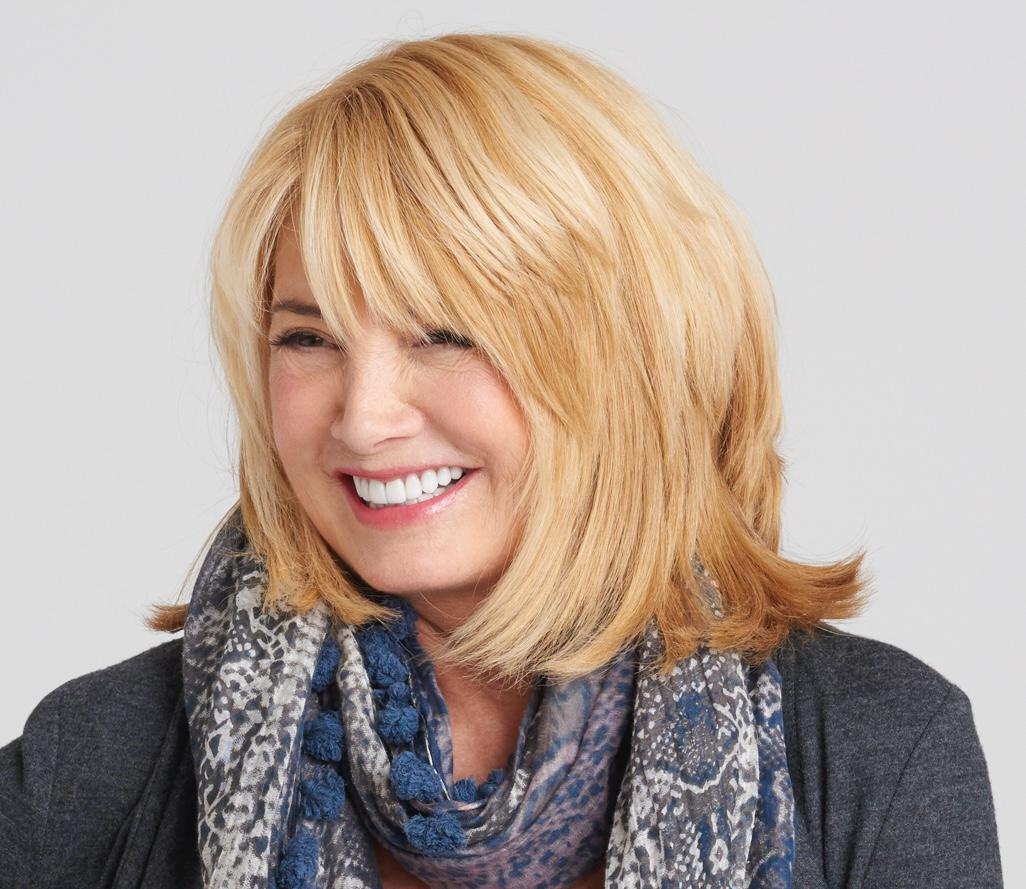
- Born: June 16, 1955 (age 71)
- Education: New York University
- Occupations: Founder and former president of Bodyslimmers
- Spouse: Mitchell S. Steir

Nancy Ganz (born June 16, 1955) is an American undergarment entrepreneur, inventor of the shapewear category, and the founder (1990) and former president of Bodyslimmers.

== Early life ==
Ganz was born in Hewlett, New York, the daughter of Norma and Harry Ganz. Upon receiving a degree in Biology from New York University in 1977, Ganz spent two years modeling and serving as an apprentice in the family’s private-label blouse company. During that time, Ganz learned her parents’ business; her mother taught her the design aspects while her father shared knowledge on the fundamentals of manufacturing and business.

== Career ==
In 1986 Ganz found financial backing and launched NBG Fashions to market her own clothing line, Nancy Ganz sportswear, which at one point was valued at $1.5 million.

Amidst the re-emergence of miniskirts in the 1980s, Ganz discovered that women had few options in terms of supportive undergarments. In 1988 she invented a nylon-and-Lycra straight slip that compressed women’s hips and stomach. Ganz named it the Hipslip and began offering the modernized girdle free to retailers who purchased her sportswear collection. Understanding the need to prevent competitors from imitating her product, Ganz trademarked Hipslip.

Upon the product’s success, Ganz shut down her apparel business, conducted market research for eight months, and used her own savings to found Bodyslimmers in 1990. In the company’s first month, Bodyslimmers sold 40,000 Hipslips. Ganz credits her invention to realization of a practical need.

In 1991, The Wall Street Journal reported that in a six-month period Bloomingdale's had seen girdle sales as a category increase 35% and attributed the increase in part to the sales of Ganz’s Hipslip.

Ganz and Bodyslimmers developed into a multi-line operation, creating and marketing body-slimming products, including the Belly Buster, Butt Booster and many more.

In 1996, Warnaco Group of New York purchased Bodyslimmers for a reported $15 million. The purchase allowed Warnaco to capitalize on Bodyslimmers’ popularity and enter the baby-boomers market, and Ganz went on to run the operation for Warnaco as president of the new Nancy Ganz/Bodyslimmers division until the end of her 3 year contract.. In the same year, she launched a line of body-slimming products aimed at men.

In 1997 Ganz unveiled a new retail shopping concept called the Body Bar, a self-servicing lingerie shopping assistant which provided product information based on anatomical areas, and reduced shoppers' dependency on salespeople.

== Personal life ==
Ganz is married to Savills Studley CEO Mitchell S. Steir and has two children. In 2006 she created Fashionfantasygame.com, a social networking web game that has been used in some universities as part of business education programs that allow students to make real world business decisions in the fashion retail or fashion-design industries.

== Impact ==
In 1999, Ganz was interviewed in the A&E television documentary "Unmentionables: A Brief History", which featured commentary from lingerie experts regarding the evolution of undergarments. Ganz or her products have been featured on several television programs, including Oprah, Regis and Kathy Lee, CBS News, and QVC. Ganz’s products have been described as a sign of independence and autonomy for women by some feminists.
