= East 60th Street Heliport =

Former heliport in Manhattan, New York

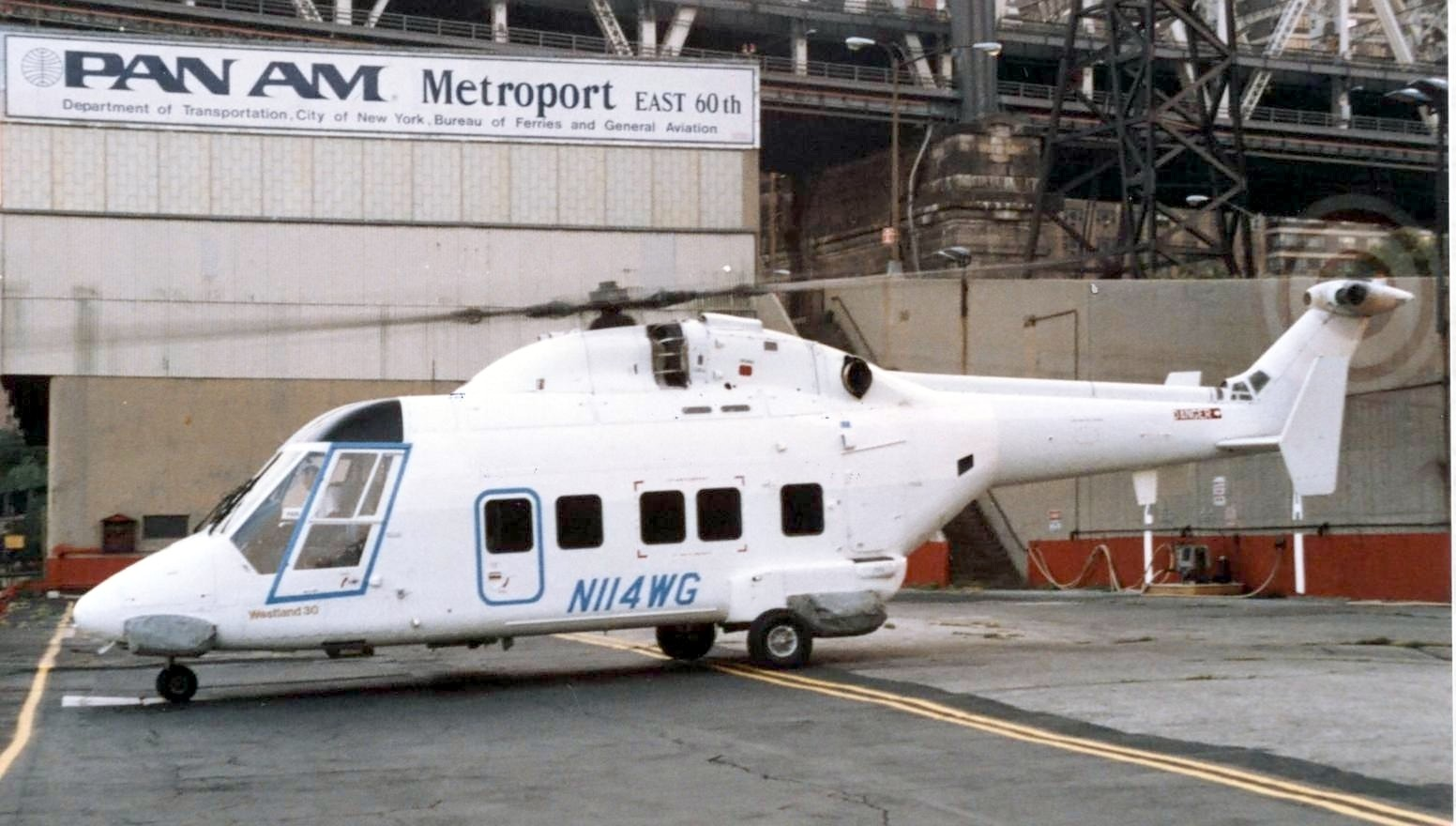
- IATA: JRE; ICAO: KJRE; FAA LID: 6N4

Summary
- Airport type: Public
- Operator: Pan American World Airways (1968–1979); Pan Am World Services (1979–1989); Johnson Controls, Inc. (1989–1998)
- Location: Manhattan, New York
- Opened: November 4, 1968
- Closed: February 1998
- Elevation AMSL: 6 ft (1.8 m)
- Coordinates: 40°45′35″N 73°57′27″W

Map
- Interactive map of East 60th Street Heliport

East 60th Street Heliport ~~(IATA: JRE, ICAO: KJRE, FAA LID: 6N4)~~ was a public heliport on the Upper East Side of Manhattan located between the East River and the FDR Drive. Also known as the Pan Am Metroport, the city-owned facility was originally operated by Pan American World Airways. The heliport opened in 1968 and closed in 1998.

== History ==
=== Planning and development ===
On January 2, 1968, New York City Mayor John Lindsay announced plans to open a new heliport serving Midtown Manhattan located on the East River between East 61st and 63rd streets. The proposed landing pad was to be built and operated by Pan American World Airways on a city-owned pier used by the New York City Department of Sanitation as a snow dump and for equipment storage. The site was accessible by vehicles from a ramp over the FDR Drive that began at the intersection of York Avenue and East 60th Street.

The main purpose of the new heliport was to encourage general aviation aircraft to utilize reliever airports in the suburbs—including Republic Airport on Long Island, Teterboro Airport in New Jersey and Westchester County Airport, allowing passengers travel quickly between those airports and Midtown Manhattan via helicopter, thus reducing air traffic congestion at the three major airports serving the city (Kennedy, La Guardia and Newark). To address anticipated concerns that residents would have about noise, operations of the new facility would be limited to use by single-engine helicopters with all takeoffs and landings restricted to occur between the hours of 8 a.m. to 8 p.m. and all flight paths occurring over the East River.

The New York City Planning Commission held a public hearing on the proposed heliport on January 17, 1968. Opponents of the project included Rockefeller University, New York Hospital and residents of Sutton Place. The heliport was approved by the City Planning Commission on March 13, 1968, with operation limited to occur between 8 a.m. to 8 p.m. on weekdays and Saturdays and between 11 a.m. and 8 p.m. on Sundays. Pan Am initially spent $50,000 to develop the 58,000-square-foot (5,400 m^{2}) site, which included three landing pads for helicopters, an operations building and a parking area for autos. The heliport opened on November 4, 1968, for use by privately operated copters.

=== Operation ===
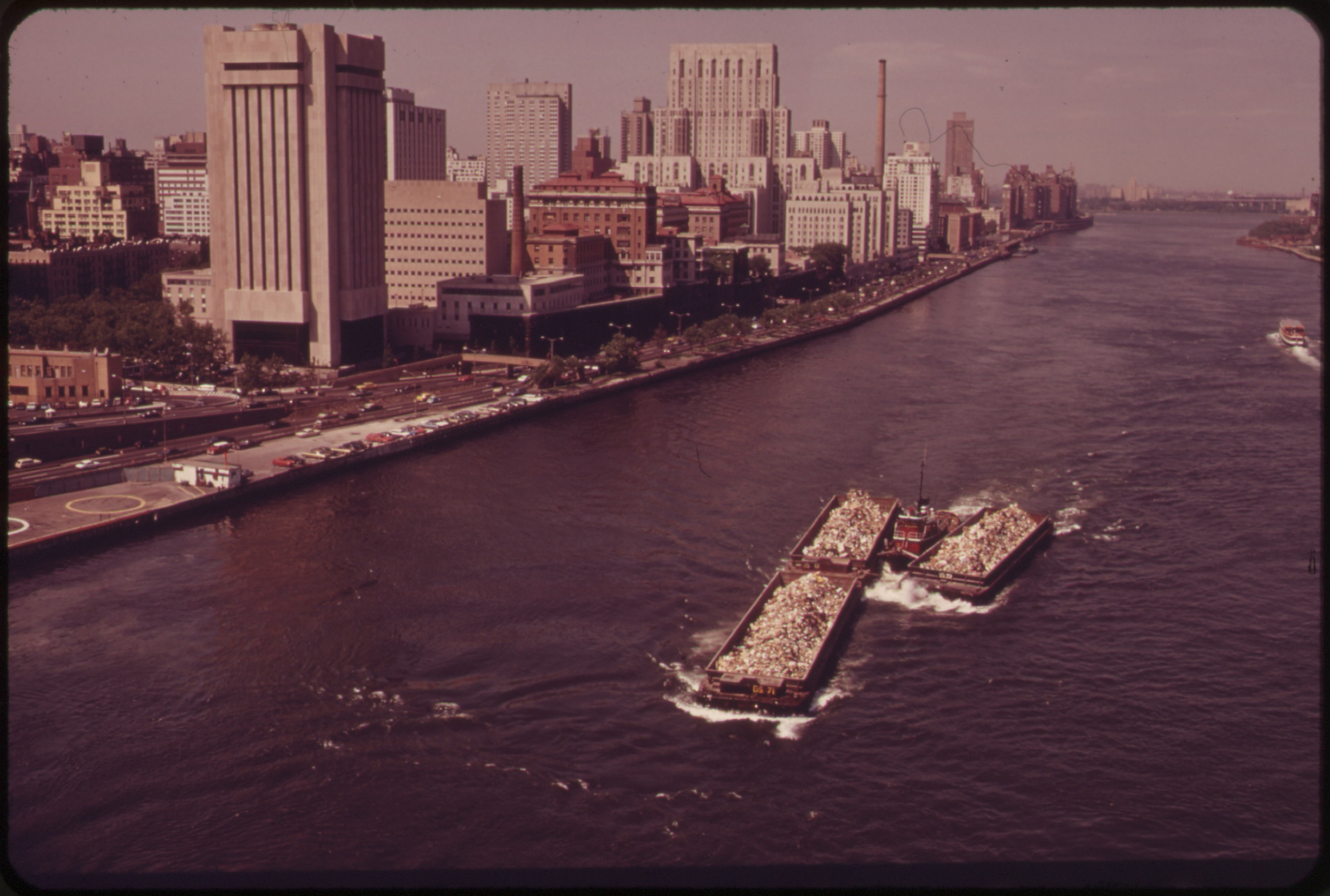
View of the helicopter landing pads, operations building, and parking lot from above the East River in 1973

In February 1969, Flight Shuttle, Inc. began operation of a weekday on-demand taxi service to Kennedy and Newark airports using four-passenger Bell Jet Ranger helicopters. The one-way fare for the eight-minute flight was $15 plus tax, and passengers were guaranteed to board a helicopter within 15 minutes of their arrival to the heliport or one of the airports. The service was discontinued in June 1970.

Pan Am began providing shuttle service between the heliport and Kennedy Airport in June 1982, after which local residents began complaining about the additional noise generated by shuttle flights and that the city was allowing the heliport to operate without a land-use permit. Previously the facility had been accommodating about 20,000 flights per year from privately operated helicopters. Another shuttle service to Newark Airport was added in May 1983. Both services were provided complimentarily to passengers booked in first class or Clipper Class on Pan Am flights. By 1983, the East 60th Street Heliport was accommodating an annual total of 36,500 takeoffs and landings, making it the third busiest heliport in Manhattan (behind Downtown Manhattan Heliport and East 34th Street Heliport) and was operating close to its capacity without room for a further expansion of flight operations.

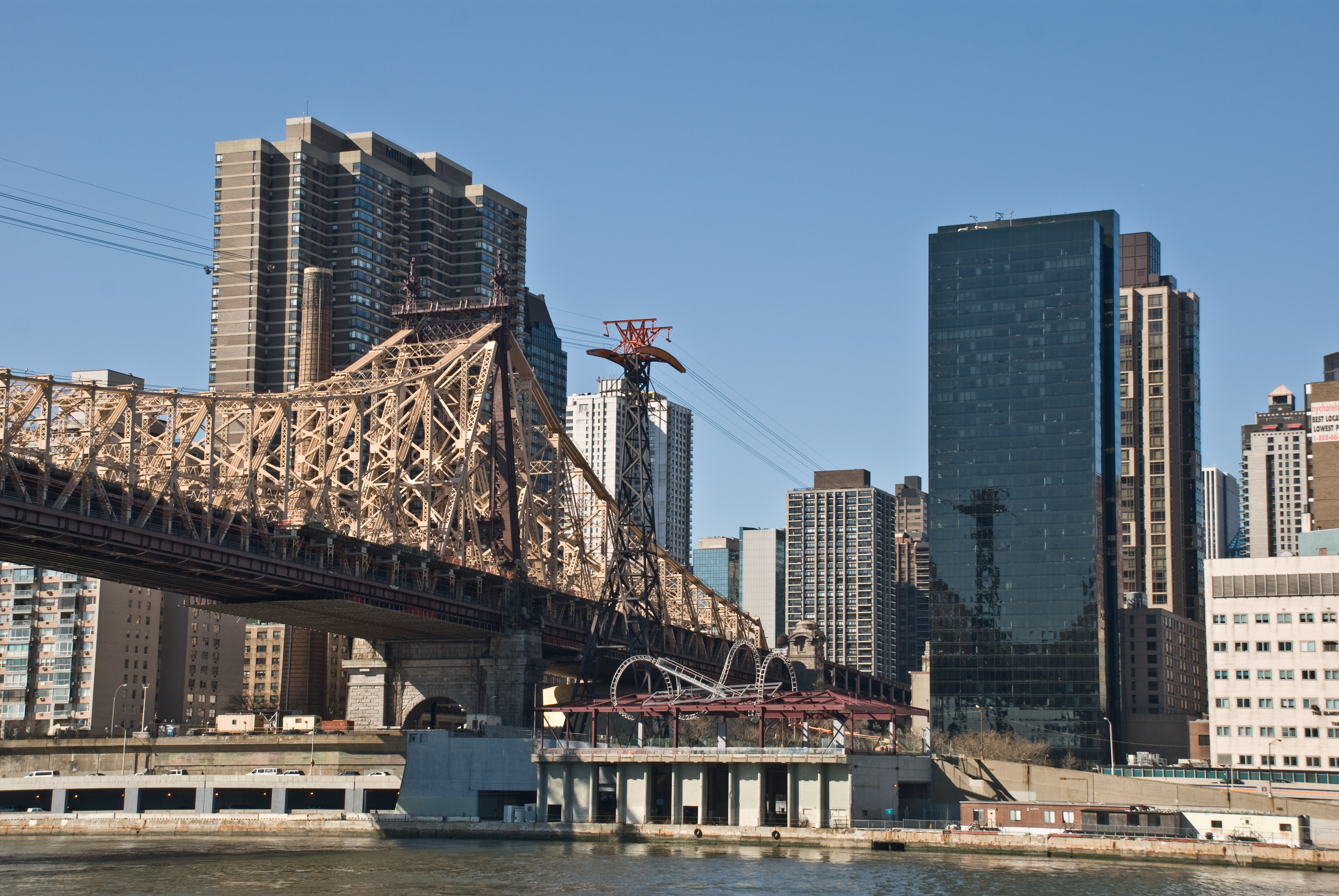
View of the public pavilion from Roosevelt Island in 2008

East 60th Street Heliport, also called the Pan Am Metroport, was the only heliport in the city that offered hangar service, which was accommodated in the lower floor of the former waste transfer station on the south side of the helicopter landing pads. In 1984, a joint venue of Embassy Suites, developer Julien J. Studley and Pan American World Airways proposed the construction of a $40 million hotel for business travelers adjacent to the heliport (on the site of the former waste transfer station). The hotel was to be an 18-story structure containing 350 guest suites, a waterfront restaurant and a waiting room for the heliport. The proposed hotel was never constructed; the site of the former waste transfer station was turned over to the New York City Department of Parks and Recreation in 1985, which later refurbished the structure, using funding from Rockefeller University and the Hospital for Special Surgery, into a public pavilion that opened in 1994.

In 1989, Johnson Controls purchased Pan Am World Services, Inc., a subsidiary of the Pan Am Corporation that operated the airport. Before the formation of Pan Am World Services, Inc. in 1979, the airport had been operated by Pan American World Airways, specifically by the company's Aviation Division that was created in 1968 to build and operate the heliport.

=== Closure and redevelopment ===
In the late 1990s, city officials indicated a desire to relocate the heliport due to its impacts on nearby residential buildings, hospitals and parks as well a conflict in flight patterns with the proposed Southtown development on Roosevelt Island. In April 1997, the New York City Economic Development Corporation (EDC) ordered the eviction of the operator of the city-owned East 34th Street Heliport over a failure to pay back rent and announced plans to shut down the East 60th Street Heliport, transferring operation of the heliport at East 34th Street to Johnson Controls, which was the current operator of the heliport at East 60th Street. After losing an effort to prevent eviction by filing for federal bankruptcy protection, the operator of the East 34th Street Heliport was evicted in August 1997 and plans were made for Johnson Controls to move its operations from the East 60th Street Heliport to the East 34th Street Heliport within a four-month period. EDC had intended to close the East 60th Street Heliport by the end of 1997, but the closure was delayed and operations at the heliport ended in February 1998.

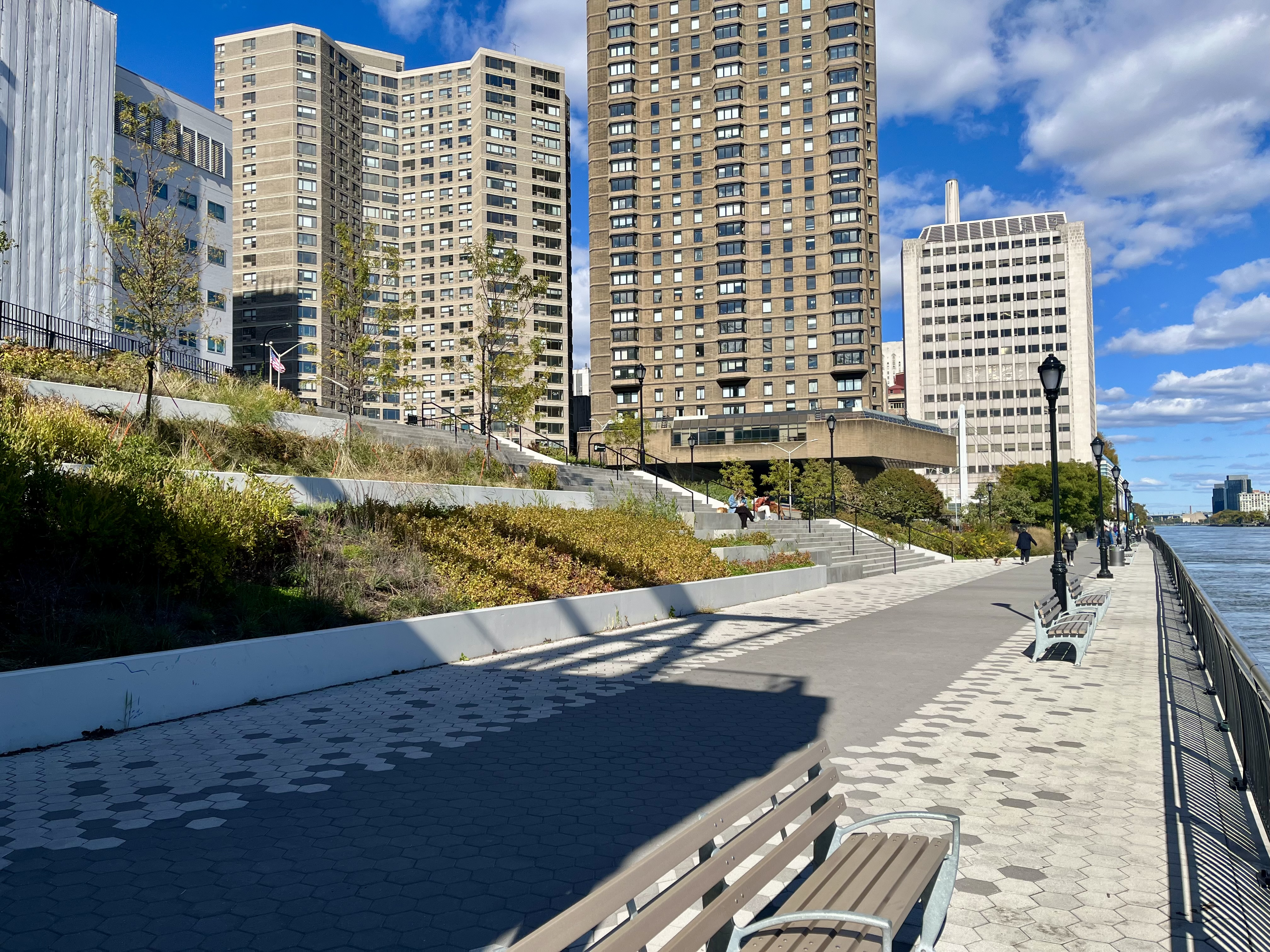
The former heliport site in 2024, now part of Andrew Haswell Green Park

Between 1997 and 1998, the New York City Department of Transportation (NYCDOT) constructed a ferry landing at East 62nd Street. The stop was added to the Delta Water Shuttle, a ferry route that operated between Pier 11 and the Marine Air Terminal at LaGuardia Airport until December 2000. NYCDOT, along with EDC and the New York City Department of Parks and Recreation developed a plan to improve the ferry landing, which had originally been proposed along with two other ferry landings on the Upper East Side to provide commuter service to Lower Manhattan. The proposed ferry service at East 62nd Street was later opposed by Manhattan Community Board 8, which felt that the onshore facilities needed to support commuter operations (including a ticket booth and passenger loading and waiting areas) would substantially impact a waterfront park proposed for the site.

From 2002 to 2007, the site of the former heliport was used by the New York State Department of Transportation as part of a reconstruction project on the FDR Drive that involved the construction of detour roadway on a temporary bridge structure in the East River to facilitate repairs to the highway. Meanwhile, local plans for the redevelopment of the area surrounding the Queensboro Bridge—including the former sites of the heliport and waste transfer station—were incorporated into a 197-a plan submitted by Community Board 8 in 2005. The 197-a plan was modified by the City Planning Commission and adopted by the New York City Council in 2006. The plan recommended constructing a new waterfront park on the two sites (now Andrew Haswell Green Park, which also serves as an extension of the East River Greenway) and converting the vehicular ramp that provided access to the heliport into a pedestrian access point to the park and greenway. Phase 2B of Andrew Haswell Green Park, which contains the former site of the heliport, was completed in December 2023.

== Accidents and incidents ==
- On September 22, 1982, a passenger was killed when he exited a helicopter to check on baggage being loaded in the rear compartment and was struck by the tail rotor blades. The helicopter was a Bell Jet Ranger owned and operated by the Omni Flight Group that was preparing to takeoff on a flight to Kennedy Airport.
- On April 15, 1997, a BK-117 owned by the Colgate-Palmolive Company crashed into the East River shortly after takeoff when its tail rotor broke off, killing one passenger and injuring two others.

== In media ==
The heliport was shown briefly in the background in the 1983 movie, Scarface.

== See also ==
- Aviation in the New York metropolitan area
