= Andrew Haswell Green Park =

Public park in Manhattan, New York

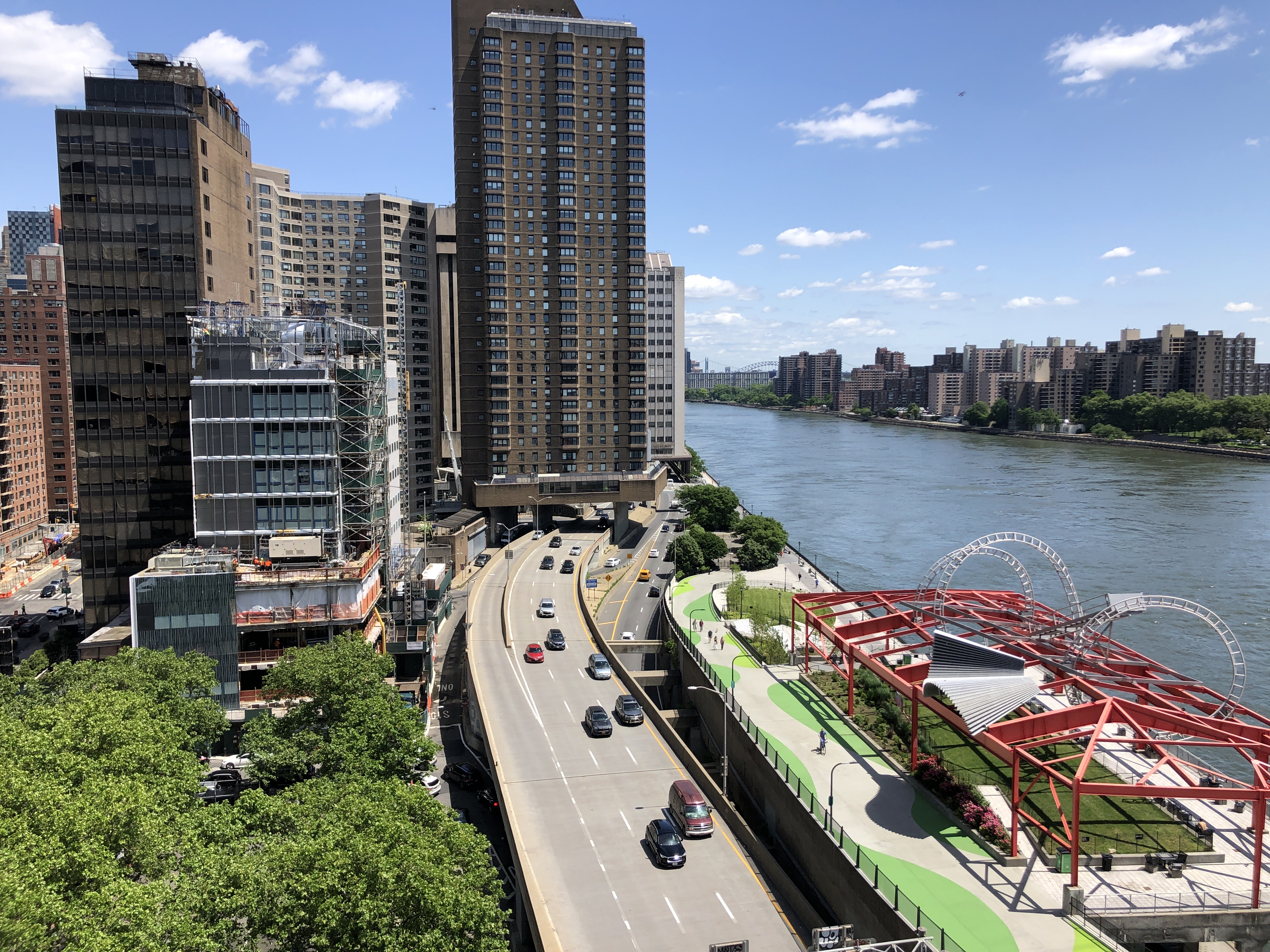
- View of the park's open-air pavilion from the Queensboro Bridge in 2024
- Interactive map of Andrew Haswell Green Park
- Type: Urban park
- Location: Manhattan, New York City
- Coordinates: 40°45′35″N 73°57′27″W
- Area: 1.98 acres (0.80 ha)
- Authorized: 2006
- Owned by: New York City Department of Parks and Recreation

Andrew Haswell Green Park is a 1.98-acre (0.80 ha) public park located on the Upper East Side of Manhattan in New York City. Named after Andrew Haswell Green, the park runs along the East River from East 60th to 63rd streets and forms part of the East River Greenway. It occupies the site of a former heliport and waste transfer station, the latter of which was converted into an open-air pavilion in 1994. The establishment of the waterfront park was approved by the City Council in 2006, following a recommendation in a plan for the revitalization of the area around the Queensboro Bridge prepared by the local community board.

== History ==
=== Background ===
The park is located on the Upper East Side of Manhattan along a segment of the East River waterfront that formerly contained a waste transfer station and heliport.

==== Waste transfer station site ====
The southern portion of the site (between East 60th and 61st streets) had been used by the Department of Sanitation as a waste transfer station since at least the 1940s. In the mid-1980s, an 18-story hotel for business travelers was proposed on the site as a joint venture between Embassy Suites, Julien J. Studley, and Pan American World Services; the proposed hotel also was to include a waiting room for the heliport and a restaurant. The plan was opposed by local residents and groups including the Greenacre Foundation, Municipal Art Society and Parks Council, who wanted to repurpose the site into a public park or to use the required zoning changes and permits as leverage to reduce the number of flights operating at the heliport.

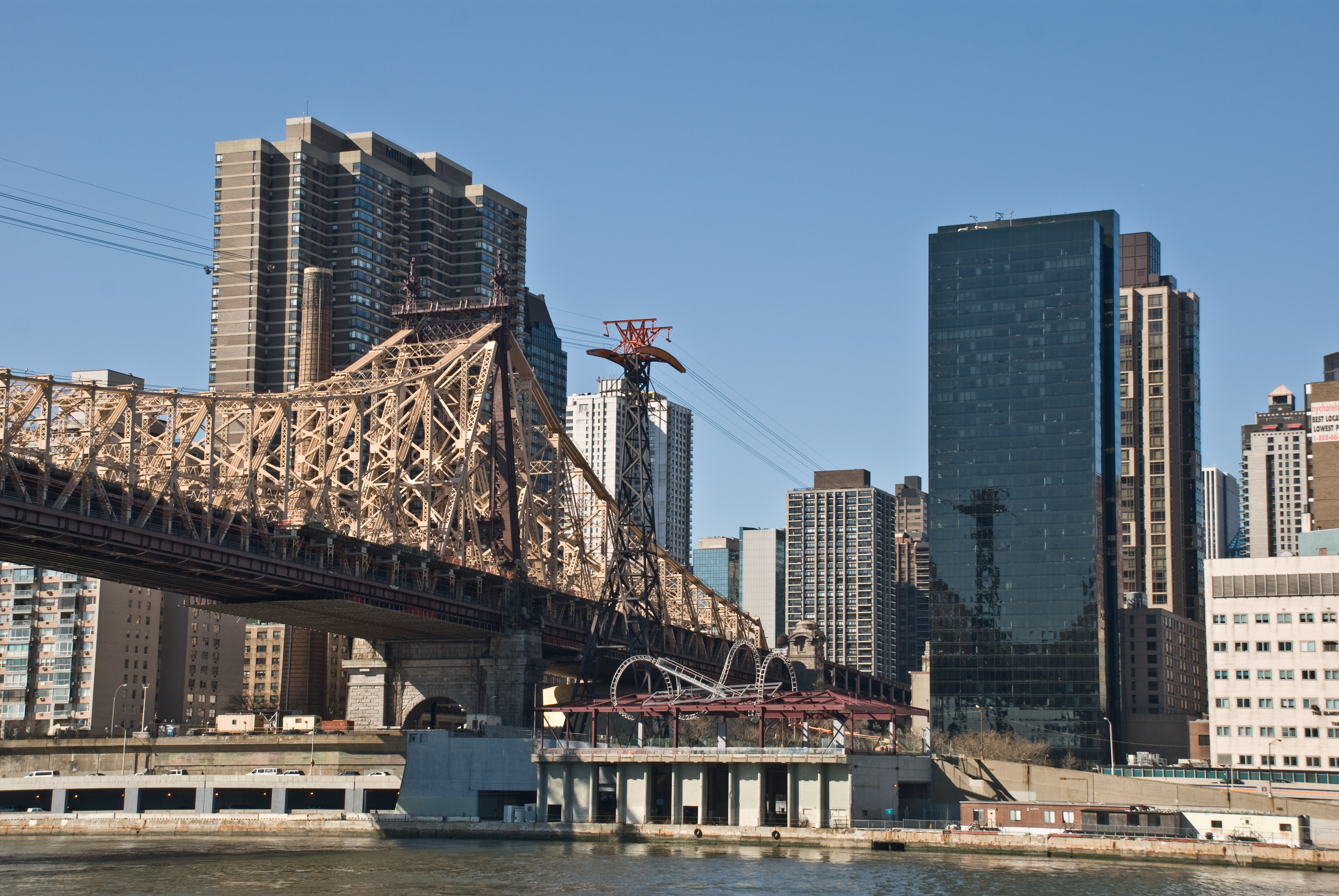
View of the 60th Street Pavilion from Roosevelt Island in 2008

The land was turned over to the Department of Parks and Recreation in 1985. Using funding obtained from the Hospital for Special Surgery, New York Hospital-Cornell Medical Center and Rockefeller University as part of air rights agreements for construction over the FDR Drive, the upper level of the former waste transfer station was transformed into a 12,000-square-foot (1,100 m^{2}) open-air pavilion by exposing the steel superstructure of the building and adding benches, decorative railing, and tile pavers. The refurbishment cost $2.1 million and the pavilion opened to the public in May 1994. Meanwhile, plans were being made to add a sculpture to the roof of the structure and a restaurant on the lower level of the building, the latter of which was being coordinated by the Economic Development Corporation with Studley. East River Roundabout, an 80-foot-long (24 m) sculpture by Alice Aycock was installed above the pavilion and dedicated in November 1995. The sculpture is maintained by the Municipal Arts Society's Adopt-a-Monument program.

==== Heliport site ====
The northern part of the site (between East 61st and 63rd streets) was occupied by the East 60th Street Heliport from 1968 to 1998. From 2002 to 2007, the site of the former heliport was used by the New York State Department of Transportation as part of a reconstruction project on the FDR Drive, which involved constructing a detour roadway on a temporary bridge structure in the East River to facilitate repairs to the highway. North of the heliport, the segment of East River Greenway between East 63rd and 125th streets had been constructed in the 1980s. Rockefeller University provided $5 million in funding in 1988 for the construction of a pedestrian bridge across the FDR Drive at East 63rd Street.

Between 1997 and 1998, the New York City Department of Transportation (NYCDOT) constructed a ferry landing at East 62nd Street. The stop was added to the Delta Water Shuttle, a ferry route that operated between Pier 11 and the Marine Air Terminal at LaGuardia Airport until December 2000. NYCDOT, along with EDC and the Department of Parks and Recreation developed a plan to improve the ferry landing, which had originally been proposed along with two other ferry landings on the Upper East Side to provide commuter service to Lower Manhattan. The proposed ferry service at East 62nd Street was later opposed by Manhattan Community Board 8, which felt that the onshore facilities needed to support commuter operations (including a ticket booth and passenger loading and waiting areas) would substantially impact a waterfront park proposed for the site.

=== Planning and development ===
Plans for the redevelopment of the area surrounding the Queensboro Bridge—including the former sites of the waste transfer station and heliport—were incorporated into a plan submitted by Community Board 8 in 2005, pursuant to Section 197-a of the New York City Charter. The 197-a plan recommended constructing a new waterfront park on the two sites, extending the East River Greenway through the new park, rehabilitating the former waste transfer station structure, and converting the vehicular ramp from the intersection of York Avenue and East 60th Street into a pedestrian access point to the park and greenway. The 197-a plan was modified by the City Planning Commission and adopted by the City Council in 2006. The new park was named after Andrew Haswell Green, whom Manhattan Borough Historian Michael Miscione called "the unsung 19th century master planner". Miscione had advocated raising public awareness about Green for more than a decade, including having a park in New York City named after him.

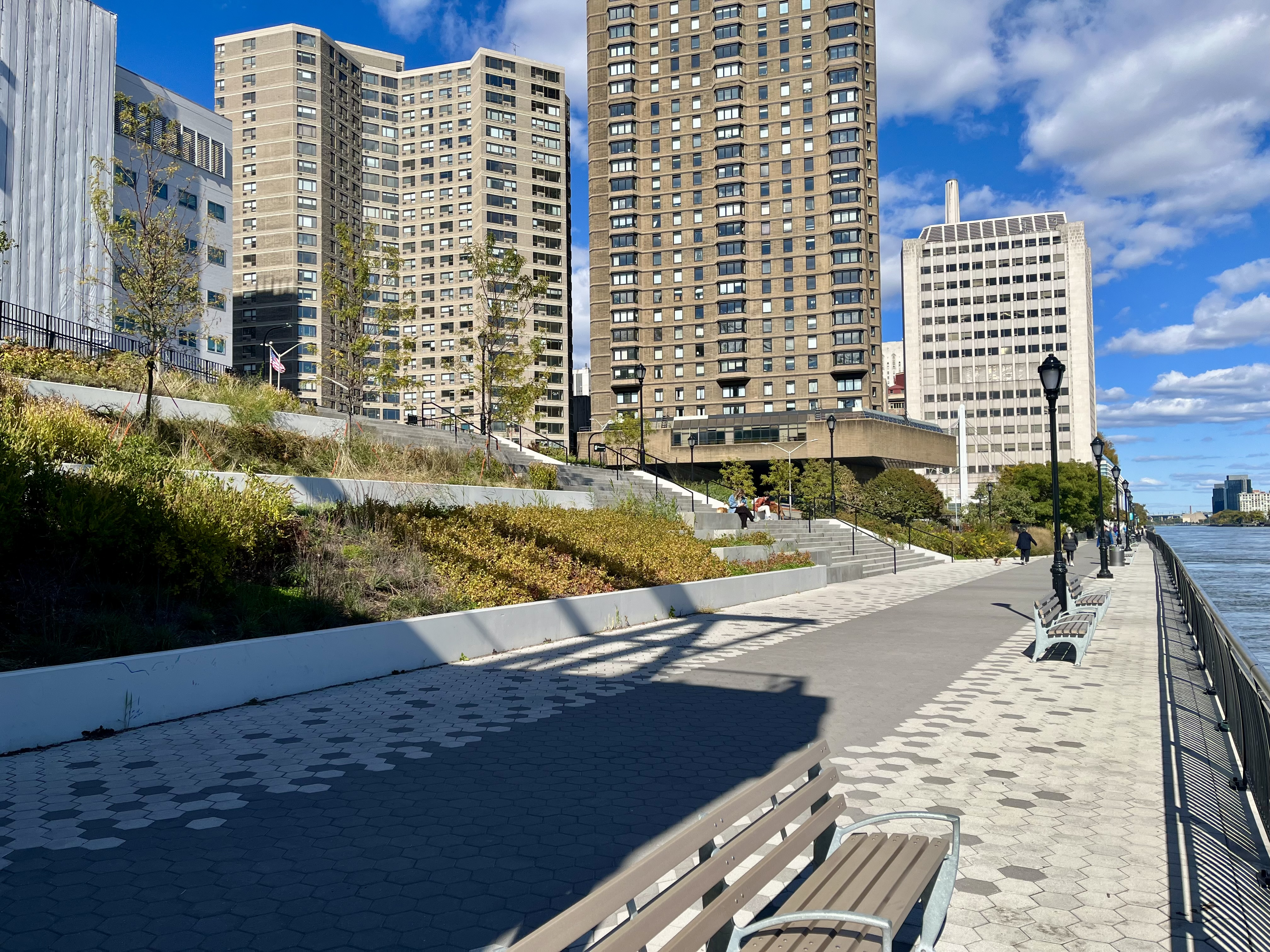
The esplanade and park in 2024, following completion of Phase 2B

Construction of the first phase of the new park began on April 9, 2008, which included a dog run and landscaping; this section of the park is located between East 62nd and 63rd streets; The park was completely submerged when Hurricane Sandy struck in October 2012. In 2015, a floating barge attached to the waterfront esplanade at East 62nd Street was proposed by EDC to serve as a ferry landing on the Soundview Ferry as part of the Citywide Ferry Service project (which was implemented as NYC Ferry). Plans for the proposed ferry landing were abandoned two years later, when EDC removed the East 62nd Street stop on the Soundview route, replacing it with a stop at the East 34th Street Ferry Landing; this was done to avoid safety hazards with other vessels in the narrow channel between Manhattan and Roosevelt Island, as well as to improve connectivity for ferry passengers.

Phase 2A of the park construction involved renovations to the upper level of the pavilion, adding a lawn area along with new seating and game tables. The pavilion reopened to the public in April 2018. Construction of Phase 2B of the park (located between East 61st and 62nd streets) and the southerly extension of the East River Greenway to East 53rd Street began in November 2019. During this time, the lawn area on the upper level of the pavilion was re-sodded and an irrigation system was added, after local residents complained that it had deteriorated into a dirt field. In October 2022, signage indicating the name of the park was installed on a tower for the Roosevelt Island Tramway located above the ramp leading from the intersection of York Avenue and East 60th Street. Phase 2B of the park construction and the extension of the esplanade to East 53rd Street were completed in December 2023; this phase of construction was delayed due to the COVID-19 pandemic. The cost of the final phase of the expansion of Andrew Haswell Green Park was about $42.6 million.

Phase 3 of the park construction, which involves converting the area under the pavilion into a program destination, has not been funded. A 2018 concept plan called for redeveloping the area to include a food concession area with seating, Wi-Fi and charging station kiosks, benches and bench swings, bicycle parking, and a restroom. The new elements would be located on both sides of the East River Greenway.
