= Ghost Ballet for East Bank Machineworks =

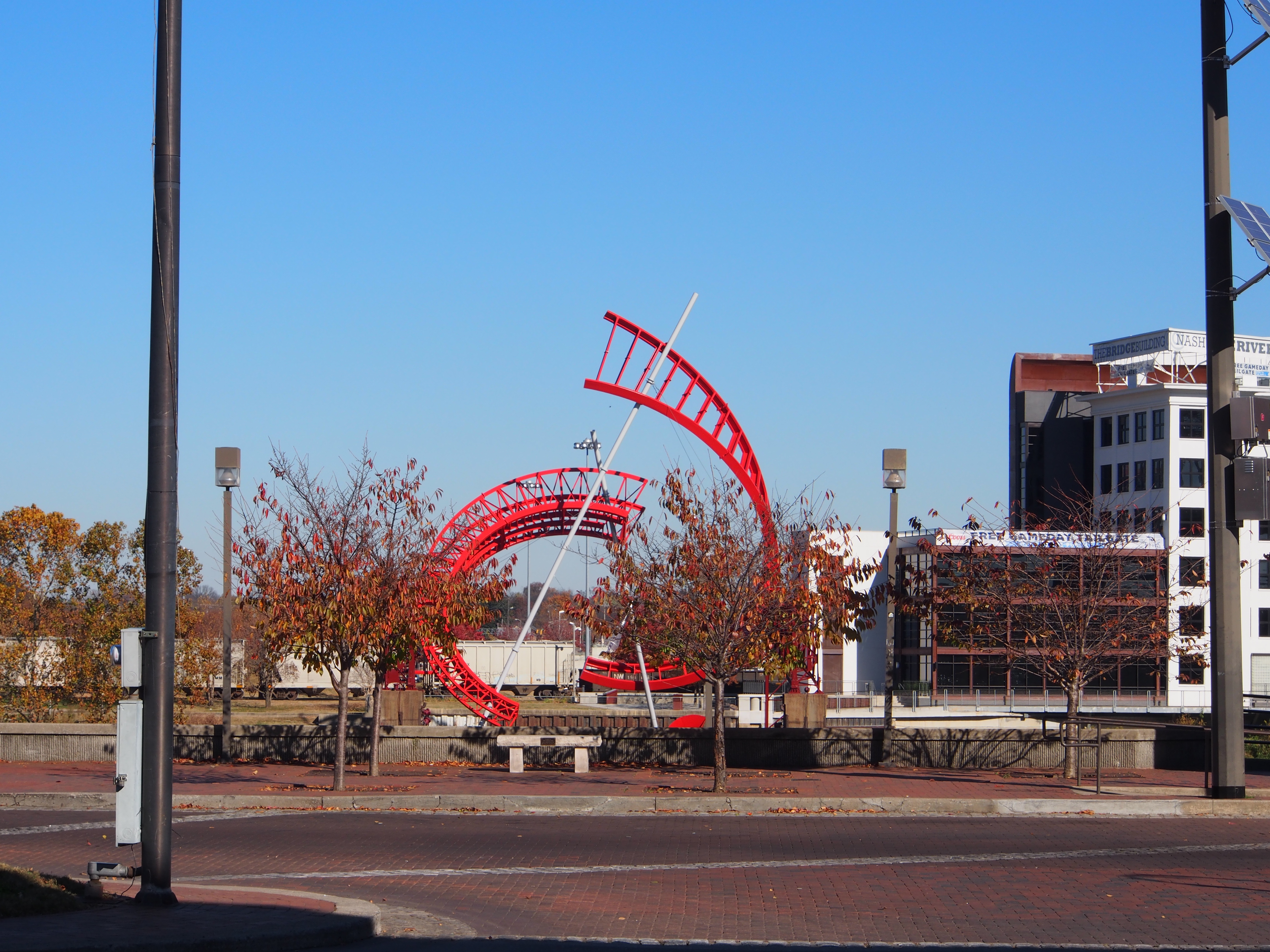
- The public art installation in 2013
- Artist: Alice Aycock
- Completion date: 2007
- Medium: public art, modern sculpture
- Dimensions: 3,000 cm × 3,000 cm × 1,800 cm (100 feet × 100 feet × 60 feet)
- Location: 592 South 1st Street, Nashville, Tennessee, United States
- 36°09′47″N 86°46′19″W

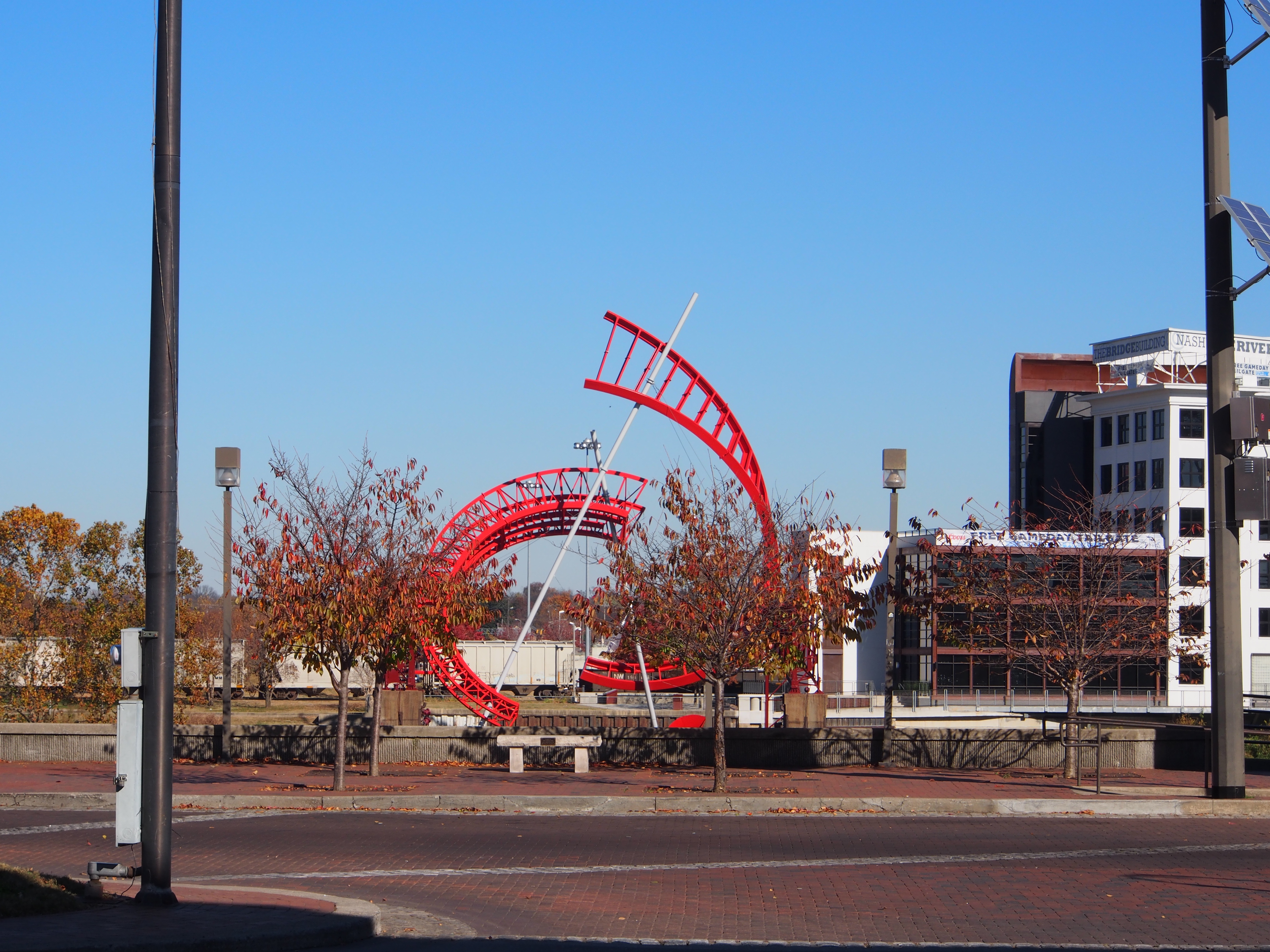
Ghost Ballet as seen from Broadway Avenue in Nashville, TN

Ghost Ballet for the East Bank Machineworks, also known by its abbreviation Ghost Ballet, is a public art installation and modern sculpture at the east bank of the Cumberland River between Nissan Stadium and the John Seigenthaler Pedestrian Bridge in Nashville, Tennessee. It was designed by Alice Aycock.

Despite being motionless, Ghost Ballet seeks to achieve 'static animation'. With its location between the downtown area, pedestrian bridge, and stadium, Ghost Ballet has the ability to be observed from many vantage points throughout the central business district of Nashville. The way the piece seems to change shapes while the viewer moves around it from these highly utilized areas reminded Aycock of "a certain kind of movement, dance movements" which is why she titled it Ghost Ballet.

== Composition ==
The sculpture is approximately 100-feet tall, 100-feet wide and 60-feet deep. A distinct element of the piece is how it is built atop a partially deconstructed gantry crane.

According to Aycock, the structure is "engineered for hurricane-strength winds, snow and human loads". Most of the materials for the metalwork came from Dover Tank and Plate Company of Dover, Ohio while the electrical elements came from Perfection Electricks. These materials include painted steel and aluminum in the form of thermoformed acrylic shapes that are painted in neon hues and periodically lighten up with electronic lights. The spiral red steel is meant to invoke imagery of the use of railroads in Nashville's industrial history.

The Nashville Office of Arts and Culture describes Ghost Ballet's visuals as follows:

"The main structure of the sculpture is comprised of arced, red-painted steel trusses that twist upward from the crane base to form a disconnected spherical shape. On the ground, a red-painted aluminum “turbine whirlwind” serves as a visual generator for the swirling trusses above. At night, a glowing neon fixture illuminates the sculpture’s center."

The piece was completed in 2007; however, a small portion of the piece was rotated in 2008 at the request of Aycock. Aycock was sixty‐two years of age when Ghost Ballet for the East Bank Machineworks was officially dedicated in 2008.

== Vision ==
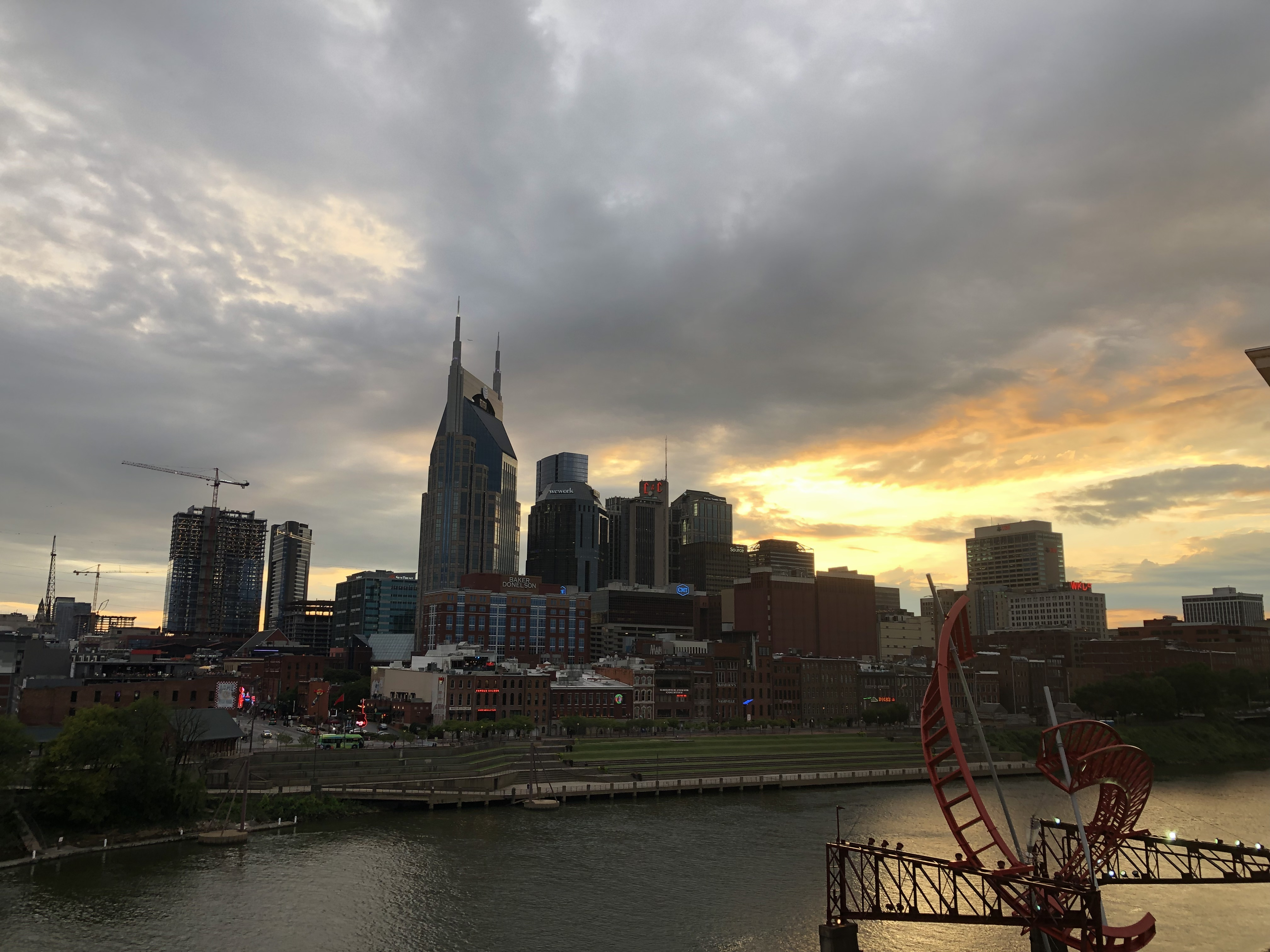
Nashville's skyline and Cumberland River as seen from Ghost Ballet, August 2019

The incorporation of the gantry crane is a testament to the river commerce that was once the lifeblood of Nashville's economy.

Thematically combining historical elements of the city with this modern art piece continues with the incorporation of railroad-like twisted red metal that is the hallmark of the Ghost Ballet. In using elements of the mostly departed river and railroad industries of the city, Ghost Ballet seeks to memorialize them while simultaneously acknowledging a transcendence from them.

The decision to install the sculpture on existing concrete pillars and steel trusses emphasizes the historical context of the setting. This placement seeks to instill the memory of the industrial history of Nashville's once heavily utilized Cumberland River and surrounding railroads. Also, by using an existing foundation the installation is able to further bolster its height without added materials. Furthermore, with its location as a central focal point of Nashville, it itself is a blend of old and new just like the city that continues to grow around it.

When proposing the piece to Metro Nashville Arts Commission's Competition Committee, Aycock had the following remark:

“The new metaphorical construction operates as a sign signifying the activity and energy that was generated on the site and also refers to the energy and excitement that still exists. The flying trusses and bridgework, which form the compositional structure of the project, refer not only to the cranes that once occupied the site but also to the existing bridges, which span the river. The flying trusses suggest that the viewer experience the entire site as a work of art ‐ a museum without walls.”

As Aycock stated when proposing the piece, the use of lighting throughout the structure is further meant to convey the idea of a “'ghost image' of the past as well as the visual manifestation of the energy of the present".

== Funding ==
In June 2000, the Metro Nashville Arts Commission's (MNAC) public art program was established when the Metropolitan Council of Nashville and Davidson County established the “Percent for Public Art” ordinance which earmarked “one percent (1%) of the net proceeds of general obligation bonds issued for construction projects to fund public art”. Despite being completed in 2007, Ghost Ballet for East Bank Machineworks was the first piece commissioned using funds from the city's Percent for Public Art Work.

According to the Tennessee Performing Arts Center (TPAC), “this new program funded the roughly $500,000 cost of the sculpture, including artist fees, engineering, and fabrication of the sculptural elements; site preparation; restoration of existing steel beams; transportation; signage; installation; and lighting.”

== Reception ==
Ghost Ballet for the East Bank Machineworks was selected by the Americans for the Arts 2010 Public Art Network's Year in Review 50-Year Retrospective as one of the best 50 public art projects over the past 50 years."

Some art historians have praised Aycock for her desire to transform decaying infrastructure into more structures that more greatly contribute to the spirit of modern society. Mary M. Tinti stated the following in Women’s Art Journal:

"Aycock's frustration with homogeneous design and rampant urban sprawl seen across America may have found another outlet here with Ghost Ballet. With so many of our roads, bridges, and tunnels in desperate need of repair, projects like this put the wonder and excitement back in physics and engineering and inject a bit of good, imaginative structure back into our environment.”
