= Hot Springs Airship Company =

- Industry: Aviation
- Founded: February 24, 1908
- Headquarters: Hot Springs, Arkansas

The Hot Springs Airship Company was formed on February 24, 1908, by Joel T. Rice and John A. Riggs. The first airship they built, a 50-foot ship named The Arkansas Traveler, was a limited success. It did manage to get into the air, but on its first flight was only able to climb to 25 feet (7.6 m) due to excessive weight. A single motor drove three different propellers which could be swiveled to steer the machine.

Articles of incorporation were filed on February 19, 1908, listing Dr. W. H. Connell, W. J. Westmoreland, and Joel T. Rice as incorporators, with an initial capitalization of $50,000 (equivalent to $1,200,000 in 2024). Rice was reported to have recently made a trip to New York to purchase material for use in constructing the ship. After working on his design for over a decade, Rice had built a model which was five feet long and 18 inches in diameter, which he intended to scale up to 75 feet long and 25 feet in diameter, believing the larger version would be able to reach a speed of 100 miles per hour.

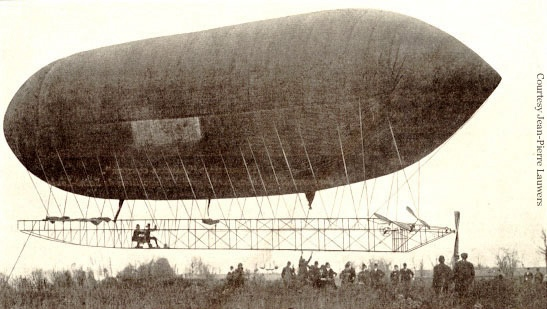
American Eagle, at the Morris Park Aerodrome, 1909

The Arkansas Traveler was moved to New York in 1909 to participate in the Hudson–Fulton Celebration. A second airship, The American Eagle, was constructed at the Morris Park Aerodrome, at a cost of over $5,000 (equivalent to $120,000 in 2024). At the time, this was the largest steel-framed airship in the country. The name was unpopular with New Yorkers, leading to the newspapers of the time referring to it as The Arkansas Traveler, the same name as the previous ship. Plans were being made for the Seeing New York company to use the ship for sightseeing tours over New York City.
