= S. K. Lawton =

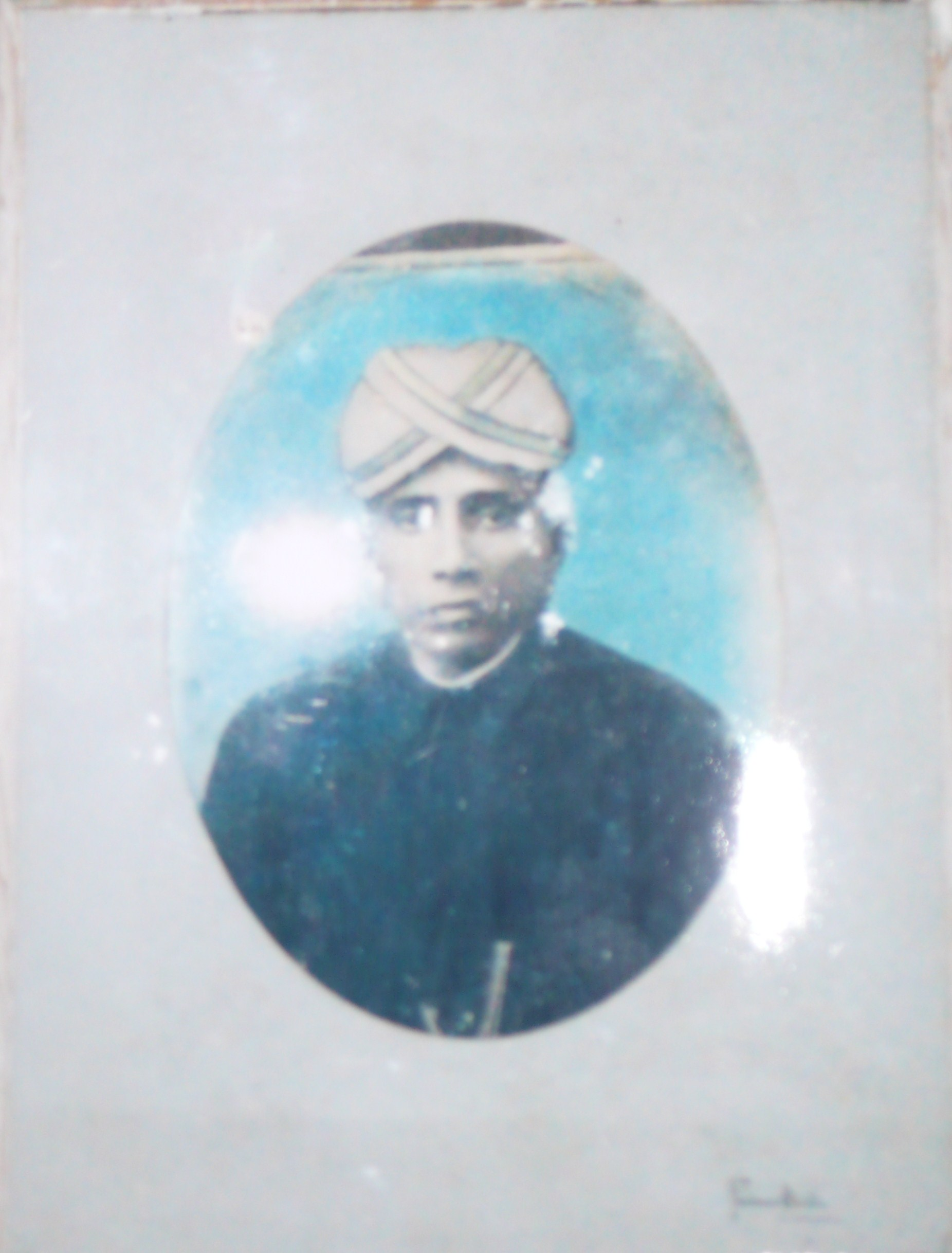
- Born: Swaminathar Kanagaratnam; 1851; Manipay, Jaffna, Sri Lanka
- Died: 1919 (aged 67–68)
- Occupation: Photographer

Swaminathar Kanagaratnam Lawton (1851–1919), known professionally as S. K. Lawton, was a well known and popular Ceylonese photographer who pioneered various photographic techniques in his home country of Sri Lanka. He mainly worked and studied in his birthplace in Jaffna where he established his photographic business S.K. Lawton & Co. in 1876. Lawton wrote numerous times for the Penrose Pictorial Annual, a London-based review of graphic arts that was printed nearly annually from 1895 to 1982. He was granted a 14-year English patent for his work on preparing paper to prevent its injury during development of the photos. Lawton wrote about the use of fish glue in The Penrose Annual where he discusses how its oxidation over time causes it to gradually make the enamel of the photographic paper tender. He is also the father of Kalaiarasu Kanagaratnam Chornalingam who pioneered acting in Sri Lanka. Lawton married twice and is an ancestor of Russel Arnold, a former Sri Lankan cricket player.

== Publications ==
Lawton, S. K. "Process experiences in Ceylon". (In Penrose's Pictorial Annual, Vol. 2, 1896, pp. 44–45)

Lawton, S. K. "Deterioration of fish glue and its remedies". (In Penrose's Pictorial Annual, Vol. 12, 1906–07, p. 96)

Lawton, S. K. "A preservative bottle for platinotype paper". (In Penrose's Pictorial Annual, Vol. 13, 1907–08, p. 64)

Lawton, S. K. "Simplified colour photography". (In Penrose's Pictorial Annual, Vol. 14, 1908–09, p. 64)

Lawton, S. K. "A simple and expeditious method of making blocks". (In Penrose's Pictorial Annual, Vol. 16, 1910–11, p. 109)

Lawton, S. K. "Old negatives and their lessons". (In Penrose's Pictorial Annual, Vol. 17, 1911–12, pp. 219–220)

Lawton, S. K. "When was photography introduced into the East?" (In Penrose's Pictorial Annual, Vol. 18, 1912–13, pp. 132–134)

Lawton, S. K. "On faded photographs". (In Penrose's Pictorial Annual, Vol. 19, 1913–14, pp. 47–48)
