= Andrew Haswell Green =

American urbanist (1820–1903)

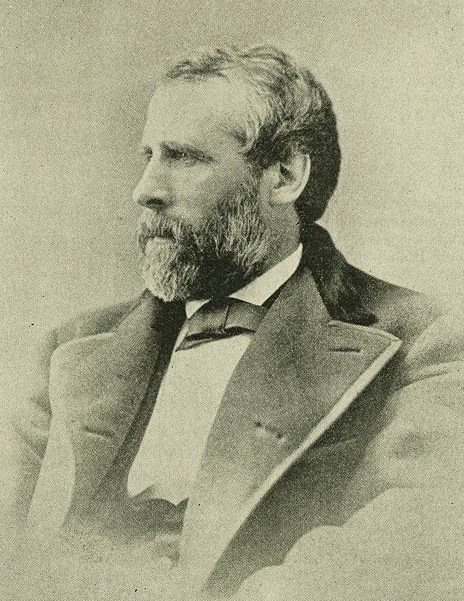

New York City Comptroller
- In office 1871–1876

Personal details
- Born: October 6, 1820 Worcester, Massachusetts
- Died: November 13, 1903 (aged 83) New York City
- Relatives: Samuel Fisk Green (brother)
- Occupation: Lawyer, city planner, civic leader
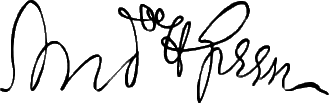
- Signature

Andrew Haswell Green (October 6, 1820 – November 13, 1903) was an American lawyer, city planner, and civic leader who was influential in the development of New York City. Green was responsible for Central Park, the New York Public Library, the Bronx Zoo, the American Museum of Natural History, and the Metropolitan Museum of Art. He also participated in or led significant projects, such as Riverside Drive, Morningside Park, Fort Washington Park, and protecting the Hudson River Palisades from destruction. Green is considered "the Father of Greater New York" for his last project to consolidate the city with neighboring towns, chairing the 1897 committee that drew up the plan of amalgamation.

== Early years ==
Green was born in Worcester, Massachusetts on October 6, 1820, one of 11 children. In 1835, he moved to New York City, where two of his sisters ran a school for young girls. One of his brothers was Samuel Fisk Green, a medical missionary of the American Ceylon Mission in Sri Lanka.

Green started work in the mercantile trade and befriended a local merchant, who subsequently hired him to manage his sugar refining plantation in Trinidad. Green lived there for about a year, where he kept a daily diary of his activities and thoughts. Green returned to Worcester for a few years before returning to New York City to pursue a legal career.

== Career ==
In 1845, Green became a lawyer under the tutelage of railroad attorney and future U.S. presidential candidate Samuel J. Tilden. The two met at a party and quickly became friends, along with Tilden's law partner John Bigelow. In 1854, Green was elected to the New York City school board and became its president a year later.

From 1857 to 1870, Green was active in or led the Central Park Commission (CPC). The Republican-led New York State Legislature began to institute measures to control the municipal affairs of the largely Democratic metropolitan region; one such act created the Central Park Commission. In April 1858, Olmsted and Vaux's Greensward Plan for Central Park was chosen by the CPC, thanks largely to Green's influence. The CPC's work would proceed under Green's leadership, despite resistance from resentful local Tammany Hall politicians who had little control of the project after the creation of the CPC.

With Green's coaxing, the legislature began to expand the CPC's authority, transforming it into the city's first comprehensive planning body. In the next decade, the CPC planned and/or proposed improvements in northern Manhattan, the Harlem River, and the Bronx. Projects included Riverside, Morningside and Ft. Washington Parks; the street plan above 155 Street; a widened and straightened Broadway; a Grand Circle at 59th Street and Eighth Avenue, and more. In 1868, Green and the Commission approved the building of the Paleozoic Museum, a museum of paleontology on Central Park; although, the project would later be canceled in 1870. In 1869, Green got approval for the CPC to create the American Museum of Natural History, and the Metropolitan Museum of Art, two public-private institutions.

By 1870, a new home-rule ("Tweed") charter ended the state-run CPC. However, the city's Departments of Public Works and Public Parks would eventually execute most of the CPC's unfinished plans. The Tweed Ring was exposed in 1870, and Green was made New York City Comptroller to sort out the ring's crippling theft and graft. He used his personal credit to obtain funds to cover the city payroll. He cut waste and halted most public works to spare the city from bankruptcy. Some critics claimed his retrenchment policy was too arbitrary and severe. Green served as comptroller until 1876.

Later, the Niagara (Falls) Park Commission was created to establish New York's first state park and defend the falls; Green soon became president of the commission and served until his death in 1903.

In 1886, his legal mentor Samuel Tilden died, leaving a fortune to create a public library for New York City, but his will was contested by relatives. The executors, Green and two others, had to make do with fewer funds. Green successfully proposed consolidating the Tilden Trust with the Astor and Lenox Libraries, leading eventually to the construction of the New York Public Library's Central Building in 1911.

Green was elected a member of the American Antiquarian Society in 1889.

In the 1890s public sentiment built in the business community for municipal consolidation of the metropolitan region to protect the mismanaged port. The state legislature created a commission to explore consolidation, with Green at its head. Green immediately proposed an ambitious consolidation plan that would be rebuffed a number of times, mostly by Brooklynites who called the movement "Green's hobby." In 1894, changing his approach, Green got a nonbinding consolidation referendum on the ballot. Most surrounding municipalities voted in favor of consolidation, but Brooklyn's pro-consolidation majority was razor thin, a scant 277 votes, 64,744 to 64,467. Alarmed by the results, opponents of consolidation lobbied to thwart subsequent legislative bills by Green and others.

New York state Republican Party boss Thomas C. Platt embraced Green's consolidation plan. As a result, in 1896, the state legislature passed a law creating a commission to prepare a charter for the City of Greater New York. The commission submitted its proposed charter to the legislature in February 1897, and the charter became effective on January 1, 1898. The charter created a municipality so large as to present a new factor in the political institutions of the country. For the first time, there was a consolidated governmental entity to oversee a great metropolitan city with a population of over 3 million people. Green's successful efforts resulted in the establishment of Greater New York, the five-borough City that exists today, and earned him the sobriquet "Father of Greater New York".

In 1894, Green rallied preservation-minded New Yorkers against the proposed demolition of the 1812 New York City Hall building. The following year, he formed the city's first formal preservation and conservation group, called the American Scenic and Historic Preservation Society. The society created parks and fought to rescue endangered sites throughout New York City and State; it became defunct in the 1970s. Green became president of the New York Zoological Society, as well, serving from 1895 to 1897.

== Death ==
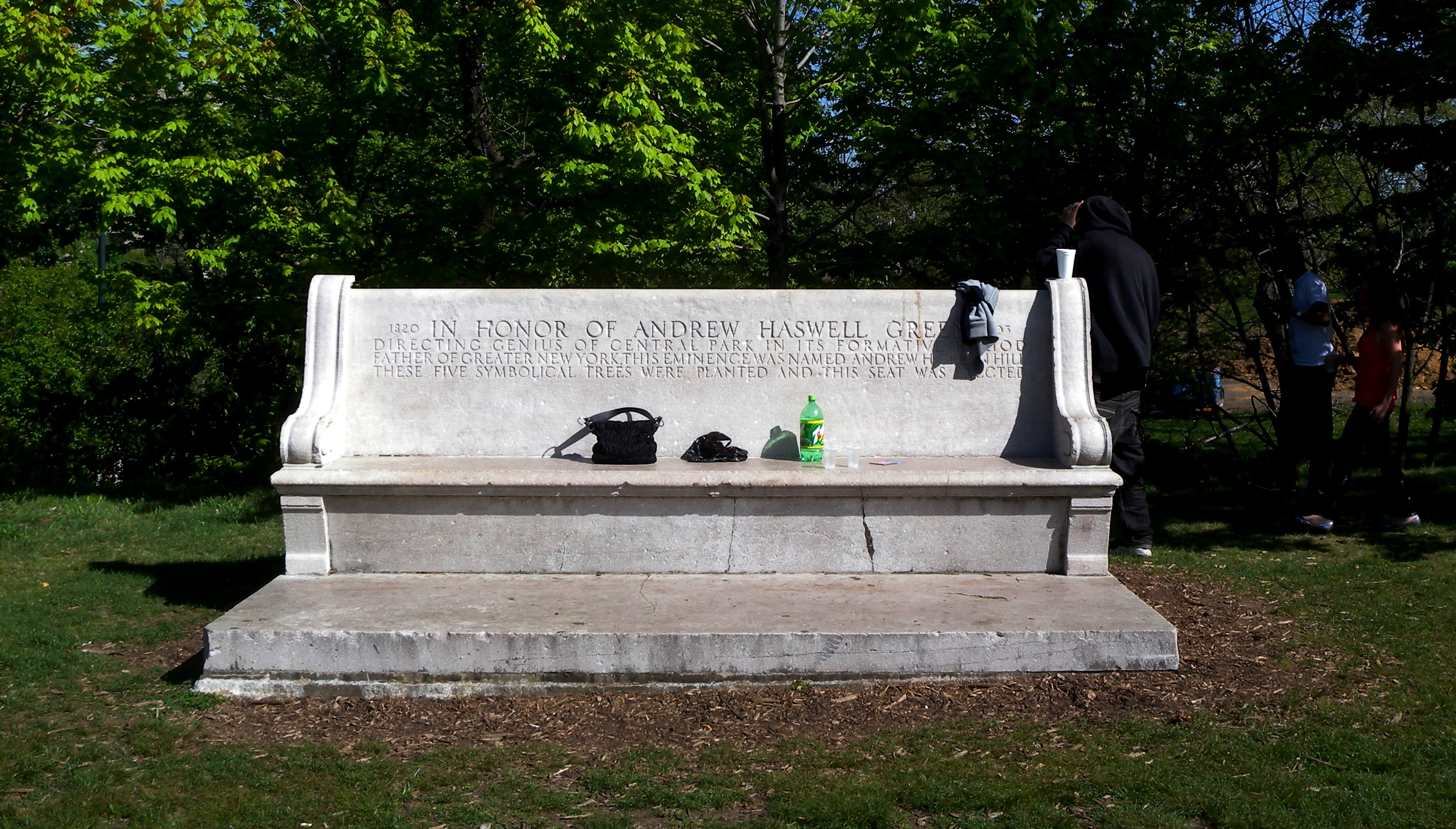
Memorial bench in Central Park

At age 83, on November 13, 1903, Green was returning to his home at Park Avenue and 40th Street to have lunch with his family when he was shot five times by a man who had been hiding in wait outside his house. His assailant, Cornelius Williams, had mistaken him for businessman John R. Platt, the lover of Hannah Elias.

Green's funeral was in New York City and he was buried in Rural Cemetery in Worcester, Massachusetts. In 1905, his family estate in Worcester was turned into Green Hill Park.

== Memorials ==
Several memorials have been erected for Green. In 1929, a memorial bench was dedicated to him in Central Park; it was surrounded by five elms, representing the five boroughs. In the 1980s, the bench was moved to another hill at 40.79512°N 73.95428°W, overlooking Harlem Meer, and new maples were planted in 1998. Bath Island in the Niagara River was renamed Green Island in his honor. In 2010, a 1.98-acre (0.80 ha) parcel on Manhattan's East Side was named Andrew Haswell Green Park in his honor. This park provides access from East 60th St. to the northern end of the East Midtown Waterfront and its in-development East River Esplanade.

== Posthumous representation ==
=== Books ===
- Lee, Jonathan. The Great Mistake. Novel based on Green's life.
