= Mitchell S. Steir =

Mitchell Shubow Steir
- Born: August 3, 1955 (age 71)
- Education: University of North Carolina at Chapel Hill
- Occupations: Chairman & chief executive officer of Savills
- Board member of: Film Society of Lincoln Center; The Museum of the City of New York; The Realty Foundation of New York; Avenue of the Americas Association; Hamptons International Film Festival
- Spouse: Nancy Ganz
- Children: 2
- Parent(s): Judith Shubow Steir; Berton Steir
- Website: http://www.savills-studley.com/bios/mitchell-steir

Mitchell Shubow Steir (born August 3, 1955) is a commercial real estate broker. He is former chairman and chief executive officer of Savills North America.

== Biography ==
Steir was born to a Jewish family on August 3, 1955 and raised in Brookline, Massachusetts, the son of Judith (née Shubow) and Berton "Bert" Steir, the founder of Service Corporation of America. His grandfather was Boston rabbinical scholar, Joseph Shalom Shubow. He attended Milton Academy, in Milton, Massachusetts, and then the University of North Carolina at Chapel Hill.

Steir's first job was at a computer training startup. He took his first real estate job with Huberth & Peters in 1983. In 1984 he received The Most Ingenious Deal of the Year award of the Real Estate Board of New York. In 1988 Steir joined Julien J. Studley Inc and has since been the firm's top-producing broker nationwide, closing more than 60 million square feet in leases over his career. In 2003, Steir led a hostile management buyout of the company pushing out Julien J. Studley and became chief executive officer. In 2014, Steir arranged the $260 million sale of Studley (pocketing over $150 million) to London-based Global Real Estate firm, Savills and he remained the CEO and Chairman of Savills, Inc. In 2020, Steir directed and managed the acquisition of Macro for Savills, adding a robust project management service line to the brokerage firm’s fast-growing North American footprint.

Steir’s clients include Time Warner, Ralph Lauren, Tiffany & Co.., Accenture, Kirkland & Ellis, Jones Day, WilmerHale, Credit Agricole, Winston & Strawn and Wachtell, Lipton, Rosen & Katz among others. Steir’s 1,750,000-square-foot restructure and extension of Time Inc.'s corporate headquarters lease at 1271 Avenue of the Americas in 1999 remains the biggest Manhattan leasing deal ever. He also negotiated the largest transaction of 2000 in midtown New York, 1,000,000 square feet (93,000 m^{2}) for the headquarters of AOL Time Warner at Columbus Circle. The deal he closed for Cadwalader, Wickersham & Taft LLP was the first significant lease inked in lower Manhattan post-9/11with such proximity to the Trade Center site, totaling 460,000 square feet with an option for an additional 400,000 square feet for growth.

Steir is a member of the American Israel Public Affairs Committee (AIPAC) Real Estate Division Executive Council. He is married to Nancy Ganz; they have two children, Max and Rachel.
