= Seeing New York =

Former New York City tour company

Seeing New York (officially Seeing New York Automobiles, Inc.) was a New York City sightseeing tour company that operated electric omnibuses and boats in the early 20th century.

The "Seeing New York" electric omnibus waits in front of the Flatiron Building, filled with well-dressed tourists

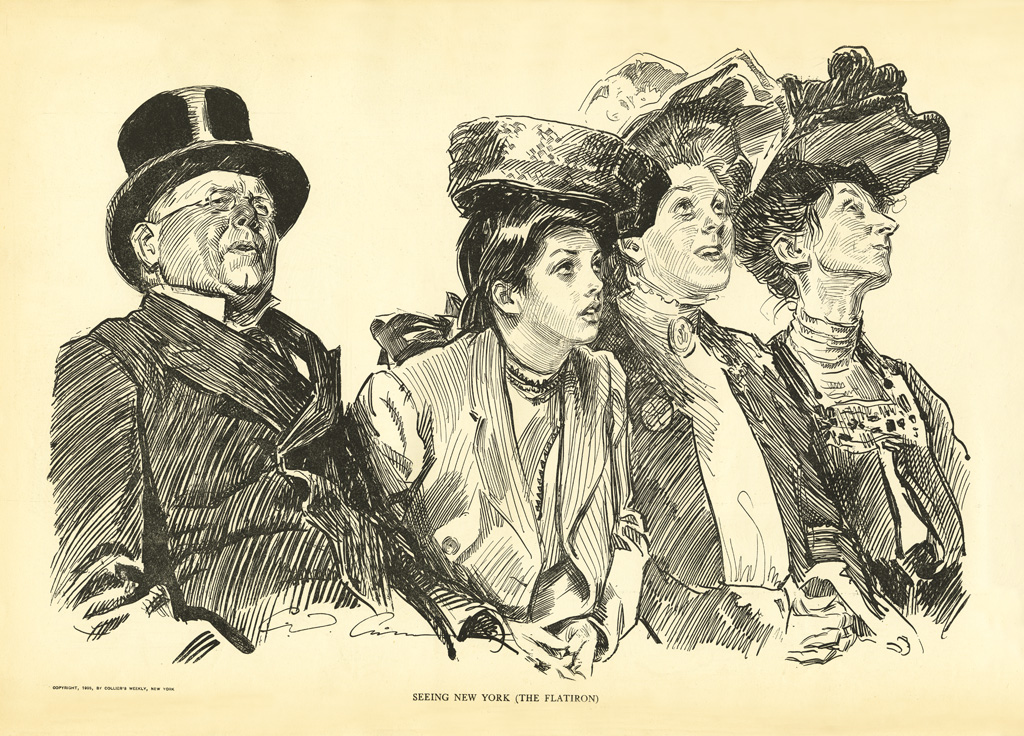
Well-dressed tourists look up while on a sightseeing tour of New York City in 1905

Tours in open-topped buses left from the Flatiron Building (then the Fuller Building), where the windows were painted to advertise "coaches, automobiles, and yachts". The men wore suits, the women wore gloves and elaborate, often feathered hats. They visited "the historic section, in its Dutch, British and American periods; the Bowery, Chinatown, Brooklyn, Castle Garden, Central Park, the Grand Boulevards, the historic Hudson River, Columbia University, General Grant's tomb, [and] statues of Christopher Columbus and William Shakespeare." By 1913, manager J. H. Mulligan and local manager R. H. Green were operating eight vehicles. In 1904, The Evening World described the tours:

Every day a "Seeing New York" coach piles. People call the passengers "rubbernecks." Most of them are so uncomfortable in their lofty perches that they keep their eyes downcast and "rubber" not at all, except when [opera impresario] Mr. Hammerstein or some other notable flits across their path.

As with celebrity tours today, Seeing New York might make stops at private residences of those in the headlines. Hannah Elias, covered in lurid terms in the press, was one such stop, with the coach returning for a second trip, apparently at the request of the guests.

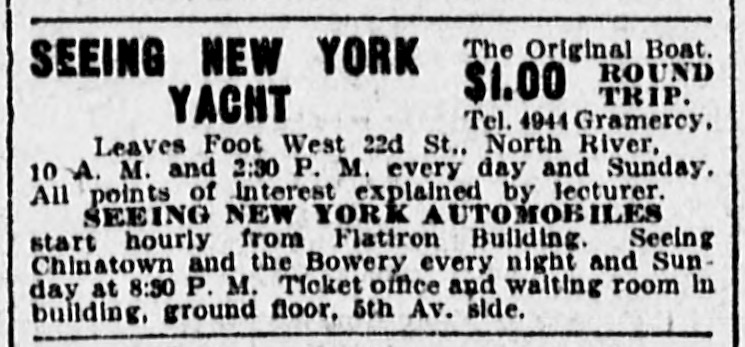
Small ad for the city tours on the "Seeing New York Yacht" and electric open-topped buses from The Sun

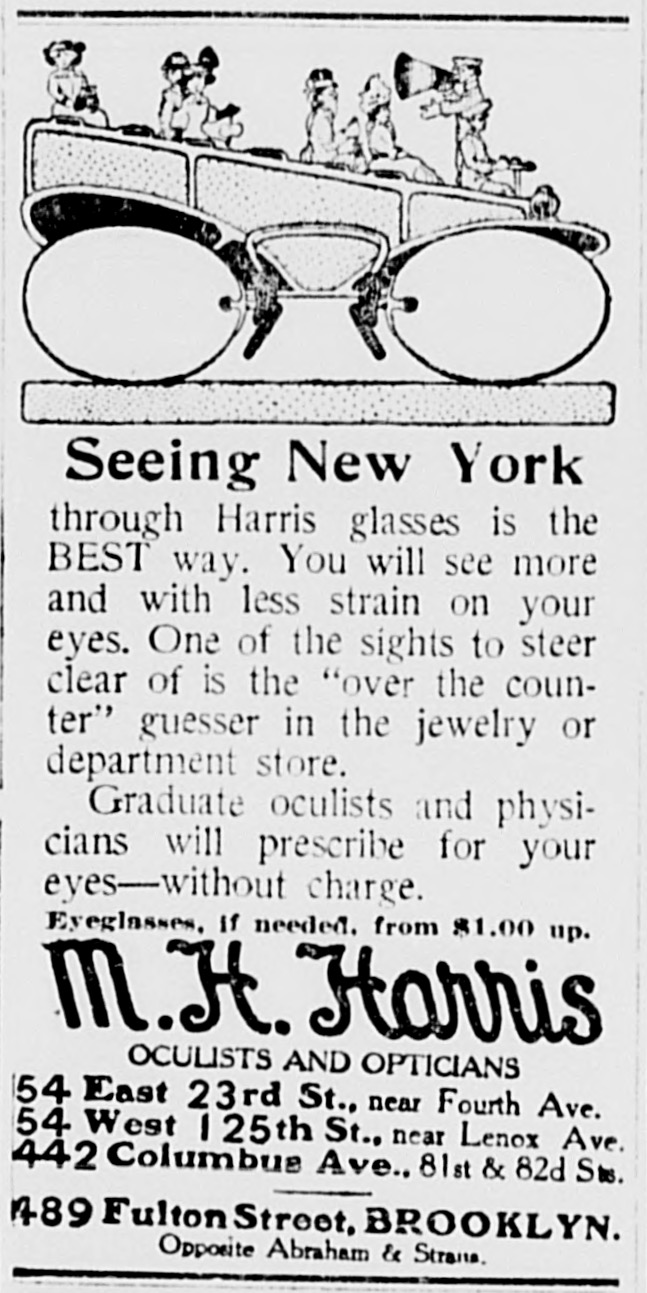
Display ad featuring the distinctive Seeing New York omnibus from The Evening World (New York, N.Y.), February 21, 1908

== Seeing Yacht ==
The "Seeing Yacht," for a fare of $1, gave a three-hour tour that circled "the island of Manhatton [sic], showing the Statue of Liberty, Blackwell's island [now Roosevelt Island], Jersey City, Brooklyn, Harlem, Bronx, the navy yard, the ocean liners and the wharves, with their commerce and extensive shipping interests."'

== Seeing Airship ==
In 1909, plans were made to use a 100 foot long airship called The American Eagle, to give sightseeing tours. The ship was built by the Hot Springs Airship Company at the Morris Park Aerodrome in the Bronx.
