= Green Memorial Hospital =

- Jaffna Diocese of the Church of South India

Geography
- Location: Manipay, Jaffna District, Northern Province, Sri Lanka
- Coordinates: 9°43′34.20″N 79°59′53.40″E

Organisation
- Care system: Charitable

History
- Founded: 1848

Links
- Lists: Hospitals in Sri Lanka

The Green Memorial Hospital is a non-profit hospital in Manipay, Sri Lanka. It was founded by Dr Samuel Fisk Green in 1848. It is a charitable hospital run by Jaffna Diocese of the Church of South India (JDCSI).

== Education ==
This hospital was the first medical school in Ceylon (now Sri Lanka), and was used by Dr. Green to train more than 60 locals as doctors during his 30-year tenure in Ceylon as part of the American Ceylon Mission. Green Memorial Hospital is the second oldest teaching hospital in South Asia.

== Patient care ==
In the middle of the 20th century, it was a state of the art medical institution that served the rich and the poor alike. Due to the civil war, by 2004 the hospital was in a state of disrepair. It is no longer considered to be a premier medical institution in Jaffna Peninsula in Sri Lanka. Numerous repairs and refurbishment were begun in 2017.

== Directors of Green Memorial Hospital ==
Hospital Leadership
Director(s)	Years	Nationality	Citation
Samuel Fisk Green	1848-1873	American	
Mary Scott, Thomas Scott	1893-1913	Canadian	
Isabella Curr	1902 (interim)	Scottish	

== Partner institutions ==
=== Manipay School of Nursing ===
Mary Elizabeth MacCallum Scott, director of the Green Memorial Hospital, founded Nurses Training School, renamed the Willis F. Pierce Nursing School, now the Manipay School of Nursing to increase the quality of nursing in the region.

=== Institute of Medical Sciences ===
The Institute of Medical Sciences provides a neuro-rehabilitation service, a free medical clinic, the Gabriella Rasaiah pediatric program, a center for women's health, as well as educational programs at the Green Memorial Hospital.
