= Alice Aycock =

American sculptor and installation artist

- Born: November 20, 1946 (age 79); Harrisburg, Pennsylvania, U.S.
- Education: Douglass College (BA); Hunter College (MA)
- Known for: Sculpture, land art
- Website: aaycock.com

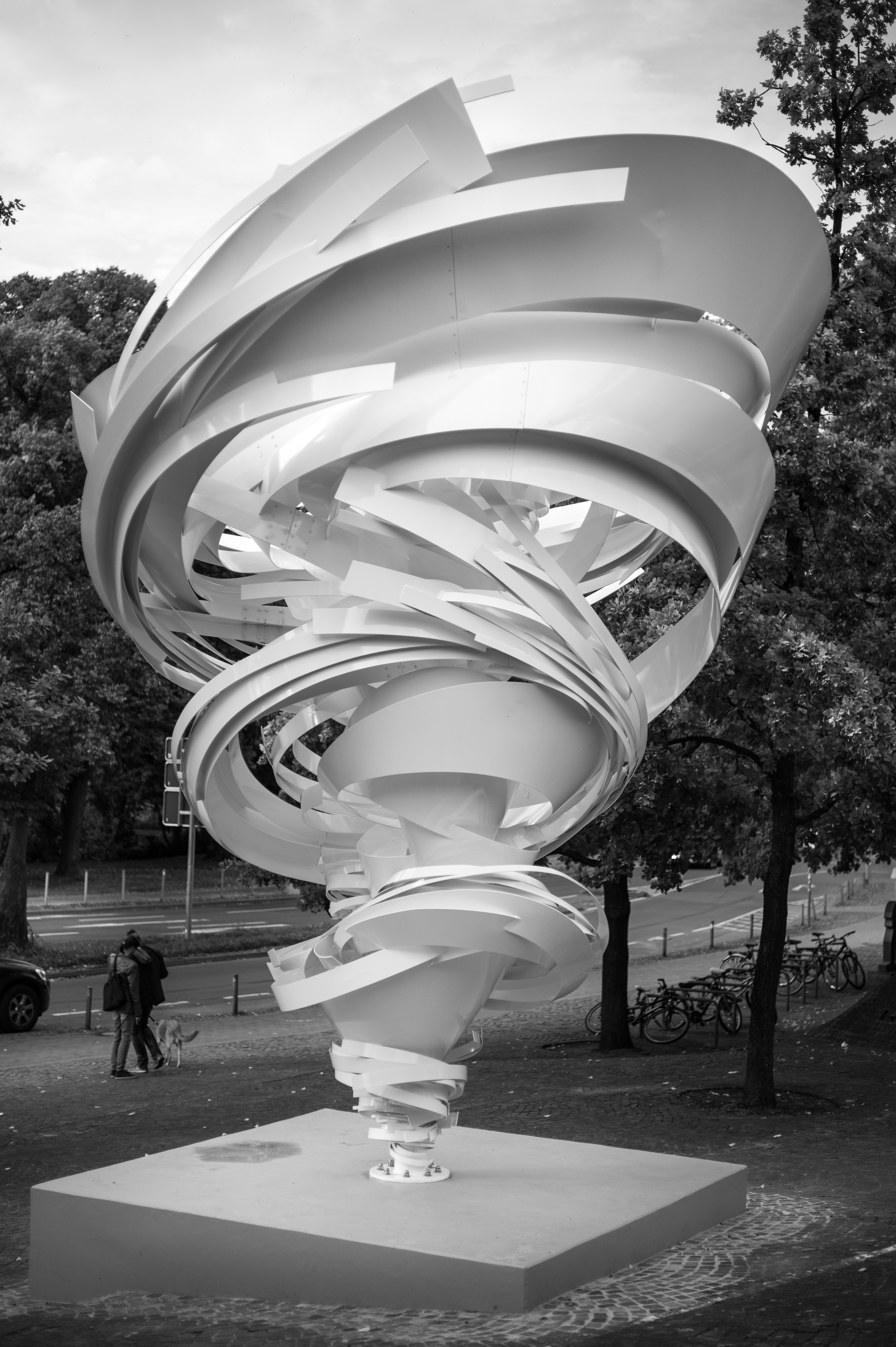
Another Twister (João)

Alice Aycock (born November 20, 1946) is an American sculptor and installation artist. She was an early artist in the land art movement in the 1970s, and has created many large-scale metal sculptures around the world. Aycock's drawings and sculptures of architectural and mechanical fantasies combine logic, imagination, magical thinking and science.

== Biography ==
Aycock was born in Harrisburg, Pennsylvania on November 20, 1946. She studied at Douglass College in New Brunswick, New Jersey, graduating with a Bachelor of Arts degree in 1968. Aycock wrote her Masters thesis on the American experience of the highway system in 1971. She subsequently moved to New York City and obtained her Master of Arts in 1971 from Hunter College, where she was taught and supervised by sculptor and conceptual artist Robert Morris. In the early 1980s, Aycock married artist Dennis Oppenheim.

== Work ==
=== Land art ===
Aycock's early work focused on associations with the environment. Often built into or onto the land, her environmental sculptures and installation art addressed issues of privacy and interior space, physical enclosure, and the body's relationship to vernacular architecture and the built environment. Her land art focuses on "goal-directed" and exploratory situations for the audience, and the structures themselves are impermanent due to lack of maintenance. The work has been related to American Indian stockades, the Zuku kraal, ancient civilization labyrinths, and Greek temples.

One of her best known works of this variety is Maze (1972). Installed on Gibney Farm near New Kingston, Pennsylvania, Maze is thirty-two feet in diameter and constructed of five six-foot high concentric wooden rings with three openings through which the viewer could enter. Once inside, the participant is meant to experience disorientation as s/he traverses through its labyrinth to reach its center, and to feel similar discomfort again when exiting. Aycock was inspired by the axial alignment of a compass as well as author Jorge Luis Borges's essay, "Pascal's Sphere," which presents the idea that the center of the universe is located wherever the perceiver is standing. The artist said of Maze:

Originally, I had hoped to create a moment of absolute panic—when the only thing that mattered was to get out...Like the experience of the highway, I thought of the maze as a sequence of body/eye movements from position to position. The whole cannot be comprehended at once. It can only be remembered as a sequence...I took the relationship between my point of entry and the surrounding land for granted, but often lost my sense of direction when I came back out. From one time to the next, I forgot the interconnections between the pathways and kept rediscovering new sections.

Additional works like Low Building with Dirt Roof (1973) and A Simple Network of Underground Wells and Tunnels (1975) involved the sculpting of natural landscapes by inserting manmade structures into the ground. Similar to works by Robert Smithson and other contemporaries at the time, Aycock was one of the few women artists working in this style. Her contributions to the field were highlighted in the 2015 exhibition "Decoys, Complexes and Triggers: Feminism and Land Art" in the 1970s at the Sculpture Center in New York.

The sense of impermanence and danger also featured in her artworks in galleries, such as Sand/Fans (1971 and again in 2008), which featured four industrial fans pointed at a central heap of 4000 pounds of sand. In the original 1971 piece the blades of the fan were uncovered, giving a sense of fear to those encountering the work. In the recreation in 2008, the blades were caged. The fans' movement of the sand echoed her interest in nature and science. She initially thought the fans would create a twister of sand in the middle, yet instead they made ripples or waves.

=== Large scale sculptures ===
Starting in 1977, use of recurrent themes of danger and unease were augmented by Aycock's growing interest in metaphysical issues. Her sculptures now excluded viewer participation and looked more like theatrical stage sets; and explored combinations of science, technology, and spirituality. The Beginnings of a Complex (1977), utilizing architectural façades and windows, was featured at her gallery installation for Documenta 6 as a symbol of this stylistic shift. The Machine That Makes the World (1979) reiterated this shift and marked the beginning of Aycock's work in large-scale sculptures and public installations over the next several decades. Aycock completed How to Catch and Manufacture Ghosts in 1979. This installation was influenced by the 19th century notion that electricity had the power to conjure life, made popular by Mary Shelley’s novel Frankenstein. The mixed media work was composed of wood, glass, water, lighting components, galvanized steel containers, birds, a performer with bubbles and pipe, copper, zinc, and a lemon battery connected to a bird in a glass bottle floating in a pan of water. The installation was created for the John Webber Gallery in New York, along with The Machine that Makes the World. In addition to the physical structure of How to Catch and Manufacture Ghosts, Aycock also created a hand-colored photoengraving, produced in 1981, which depicts a diagram of the artwork.

After 1982, her work revolved around "blade machines" – sculptures made out of revolving, motorized metal blades. With its obsessive erudition, Aycock's art of cosmic machines has again been compared to Borges's stories which involve private metaphysics of the mind, dreams, space, and time. Like Borges, Aycock provokes a fear of an existing and ultimately incomprehensible higher order that man makes endless attempts to understand.

In the 1990s, Aycock switched to more advanced engineering and permanent sculpture commissions. She also began utilizing architecture software to sketch out her drawings and plan her sculptures as they were developed. Speaking on her work relating to architecture:

"What I am trying to do is to take normal architectural language and make it disjunctive."

Aycock's recent work takes the form of large-scale sculptures based on natural forms, cybernetics, physics, and other postmodern issues, increasingly implementing hi-tech materials to create complex sculptures in public space. In 2005, Ramapo College featured her installation called Starsifter, Galaxy, NGC 4314, a 30-foot-long sculpture named for the NGC 4314 galaxy which is located 40 million light-years from Earth and has been photographed by the Hubble Space Telescope. Her 2014 piece Park Avenue Paper Chase was installed along Park Avenue in New York at a cost of over $1 million, and included seven large-scale sculptures – some of which were the largest ever installed in the public art program at that location. The seven sculptures made of aluminum and fiberglass were each designed using 3-D modeling software, then formed by cutting and rolling the pieces.

In the 2010s, Aycock began her Turbulence Series featuring swirling metal sculptures of various sizes that take the shape of a twister, a highway system, DNA strands, or even swirling dancers. Works from this series were exhibited at the Marlborough Fine Art Gallery in New York and at the Ulrich Museum of Art in Wichita, Kansas where one work from the series, Twister Grande (tall) (2020) is now on permanent display. In 2021, one of Aycock's works was placed on display in front of Des Moines International Airport.

== Collections and exhibitions ==
Aycock’s work was included in the 1971 exhibition Twenty Six Contemporary Women Artists held at The Aldrich Contemporary Art Museum Her work was included in the 1979 Whitney Biennial. Aycock has created installations at the Museum of Modern Art (1977), She has had two major retrospectives—the first surveyed her work between 1972 and 1983, and was organized by the Wurttembergischer Kunstverein in Stuttgart, and the other, a retrospective entitled "Complex Visions," was curated by the Storm King Art Center. In September 2005, The MIT Press published the artist’s first hardcover monograph, entitled Alice Aycock, Sculpture and Projects, authored by Robert Hobbs. In April 2013, a retrospective exhibition of her drawings, Alice Aycock Drawings: Some Stories Are Worth Repeating, opened at the new Parrish Art Museum in Water Mill, New York – coinciding with the Grey Art Gallery in New York City.

Aycock’s works can be found in the collections of MoMA, the Brooklyn Museum, the Whitney Museum of American Art, the Museum of Contemporary Art, Los Angeles, and the National Gallery,

Aycock’s public sculptures are seen throughout the United States, including a permanent suspended work completed in 2012 at the Dulles International Airport, her Star Sifter project for Terminal 1 at John F. Kennedy International Airport, a piece at the San Francisco Public Library, an outdoor piece at the Western Washington University Public Sculpture Collection, and a large-scale sculptural roof installation for the East 60th Street Pavilion at Andrew Haswell Green Park in New York City. Other notable works include a GSA commission for the Fallon Building in Baltimore; an outdoor piece entitled Strange Attractor at the Kansas City International Airport; Ghost Ballet for the East Bank Machineworks in Nashville, Tennessee; and a floating sculpture for Broward County, Florida. From March to July 2014, Aycock's series of seven sculptures entitled Park Avenue Paper Chase were installed on the Park Avenue Malls in New York City. In 2020, Aycock's sculpture Hoop-La (2014) from the Turbulence Series, was installed in the Princess Estelle Sculpture Park on Royal Djurgården in Stockholm, Sweden.
