= Manipay Ladies' College =

- மானிப்பாய் மகளிர் கல்லூரி

Location
- Manipay, Jaffna District; Sri Lanka; 9.714318°N 79.997801°E

Information
- School type: Public provincial 1AB
- School district: Valikamam Education Zone
- Authority: Northern Provincial Council
- School number: 1012021
- Teaching staff: 49
- Grades: 1-13
- Gender: Girls (boys in some grades)
- Age range: 5-18

Manipay Ladies' College (Tamil: மானிப்பாய் மகளிர் கல்லூரி Māṉippāy Makaḷir Kallūri, also known as Manipay Ladies' Hindu College) is a provincial school in Manipay, Sri Lanka.

== See also ==
- List of schools in Northern Province, Sri Lanka
