= Hannah Elias =

American businesswoman

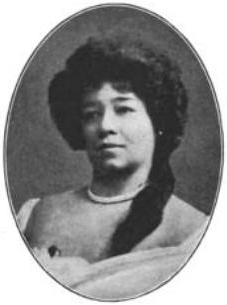
- In The Sketch, March 29, 1905
- Born: c. 1865; Philadelphia, Pennsylvania, U.S.
- Occupation: Businesswoman
- Known for: One of the richest Black women in the world at the time

Hannah Elias (born c. 1865) was an American sex worker and landlord who became one of the richest Black women in the world during her lifetime.

== Early life ==
Hannah Elias was born in Philadelphia, Pennsylvania, at 1820 Addison Street, one of nine children. Her father Charles Elias was a "negro with Indian blood in him" who ran a large, well-regarded catering operation, her mother Mary Elias was "almost white", and they sent her to public school. On January 4, 1885, Elias was arrested and convicted four days later of larceny and sentenced to four months of hard labor at Moyamensing Prison. Later accounts described the theft as involving a ball gown borrowed from her employer without permission.

== On her own ==
After being released from prison, she briefly lived at 724 Minster Street (later Addison) in the home of Emelyn Truitt. She left Truitt's to live with Frank Satterfield at a boardinghouse on 10th Street after he and Elias' brother, David, found her at Truitt's, which was reportedly a place of prostitution. She left the brothel when her twin brother David and suitor Frank P. Satterfield asked her to live with the latter in a boardinghouse on 10th Street between Vine and Callowhill. She became pregnant while living with Satterfield and gave birth to a daughter, Mabel Shaw Elias, at the Blockley Almshouse on November 5, 1886. After discharge from the Almshouse hospital, Elias gave the child up for adoption to Travis Hudson, of 1230 Wood Street, and she was christened Clara Hudson. In early 1887, she became pregnant again. Satterfield left Philadelphia to find work in New York City and Elias eventually followed him, claiming that the child was his. She confronted Satterfield in New York City and she was arrested and served 30 days at Blackwell's Island. Once released, she went to the Colored Home and Hospital where her second child, Frank Elias Satterfield, was born on October 26, 1887. The child died seven weeks later in Philadelphia.

== Affair with John R. Platt ==
While in New York, Hannah had met wealthy retired glass-factor owner John R. Platt in the Tenderloin neighborhood, at a house operated by Julius "Pop" Miller. After seeing each other a few times at Miller's, the two reportedly lost touch. Elias married Matthew C. Davis in Manhattan on February 5, 1895. According to newspaper reports in 1903, she went by the name Bessie Davis when married to Davis and reverted to her maiden name after getting a divorce, which was granted in 1897 after she had reunited with Platt. Starting in 1896 at the latest, Platt started giving Elias large sums of money as well as "volunteerd [sic] to start her in the boarding-house business", at 128 W 53rd Street, where as proprietress she rented a room to Cornelius Williams. She later moved into a mansion at 236 Central Park West, passing as Sicilian or Cuban. Williams later fatally shot city planner Andrew H. Green in front of Green's Park Avenue home, confusing him with Platt.

== Blackmail case ==
When Platt, prodded by his family, accused her of blackmailing him out of $685,385, the affair merited The World's lead story on 1 June 1904, describing her as his "ebony enslaver". Asked about allegations that she had been blackmailed as well, she responded "I have read in the newspapers that I have been, and I am frank to say that there must be some truth in a story which is given so much in detail." The novelty of a Black woman with the equivalent of tens of millions of dollars, living in one of the wealthiest neighborhoods in New York, caused the Seeing New York electric bus tours to make Elias's house a stop. Platt initially refused to swear a criminal complaint, but relented, allowing police serving a criminal warrant to break down her door, where they were escorted to Elias by her Japanese butler, Kato. At the time she said: "I have no fear. I have done no wrong, and every one of the poor people I have helped is praying for me in the time of my affliction." She was arraigned in Tombs Court on June 10, 1904. Held on $30,000 bail, meetings at the house of R. C. Cooper at 318 W. 58th St. and 149 W. 43rd St. raised money for her release. When Platt was "asked directly about Hannah Elias he aimed blows at the reporter with his umbrella and shouted: 'Don't talk to me about Hannah Elias.'" The story spread, leading to detailed court coverage in the Baltimore Sun as she took the stand and described how her money was kept in "15 savings banks" as well as "houses and lands worth $150,000, furniture and plate, worth $100,000, and jewels valued at as much more." After losing his initial court case, the court of appeals eventually ruled against Platt, allowing her to keep his gifts.

== Later life ==
In 1904, Elias gave birth to a daughter, Muriel Consuelo Elias. In 1906, newspapers reported that Elias evicted white tenants from several apartment buildings on West 135th Street with a note reading, "in the future none but respectable colored families were to occupy the flats". She was rumored to have continued in this vein, named in a 1912 article titled "Negroes Crowding Whites" as the purchaser of a $250,000 apartment building at 546–552 Lenox Avenue; however, she disputed these claims through her lawyer, Andrew F. Murray, in 1906. By 1915 she was living in a penthouse in one of her "numerous properties" at 501 W. 113th St. She joined forces with noted Harlem developer John Nail but later left for Europe with her butler, Kato, never to return.
