= Velakkai Pillaiyar Temple =

- Manipay Velakkai Pillaiyar Temple
- Murugan temple with main tower visible

Religion
- Affiliation: Hinduism
- Province: Northern
- Deity: Murugan

Location
- Location: Manipay, Jaffna
- Country: Sri Lanka

Architecture
- Type: Dravidian architecture
- Completed: Unknown

Manipay Velakkai Pillaiyar Temple is a temple in the town of Manipay, Jaffna, Sri Lanka devoted to the Hindu deity, Murugan. The temple was built by Gate Mudaliyar Sivakolundu of Manipay and has been kept in the hands of his descendants to this day. Revenue for the temple is relatively low as compared to other temples on the island considering its location in a relatively unpopulated area; consequently, its upkeep and festivities is mainly paid for by the trustees of the temple and their family members, all of whom are descendants of Mudaliyar Sivakolundu.

== See also ==
- Hinduism in Sri Lanka
- Manipay
