= John Andrew Riggs =

American politician (1867–1936)

John Andrew Riggs (1867–1936) is most known for promoting Arkansas Act 186 of 1917, which provided for women the right to vote in Arkansas state primaries. Riggs was born on November 5, 1866, to Elbridge Marion Riggs and Sarah Ann Hubbart Riggs. At the age of 22, he participated in the 1889 Oklahoma land rush, claiming a 160-acre homestead for which he paid $14.00 (equivalent to $502 in 2025).

In 1908, Riggs provided funding for Joel Rice to start the Hot Springs Airship Company, in Hot Springs, Arkansas. The company built what at the time was the world's largest steel-framed dirigible in the United States. The ship was constructed at the Morris Park Aerodrome in New York.
