= Savills North America =

- Industry: Real estate
- Founded: 1855; 171 years ago
- Headquarters: New York City
- Key people: David Lipson, CEO; Janet Woods, President; Mitchell E. Rudin, Chairman
- Website: savills.us

Savills North America is a subsidiary of Savills that represents tenants of commercial real estate. Savills offers a wide range of commercial real estate advisory services.

== History ==
Founded in the UK in 1855, the history of Savills North America dates back to 1954 when the company, Julien J. Studley, Inc., was founded by Julien J. Studley.

In December 2002, Mitchell S. Steir led a group of 45 brokers to buy the company from Julien J. Studley.

In March 2010, the company represented General Services Administration in its lease of One Constitution Square.

In February 2011, the company acquired Gravitas Real Estate Resources.

In February 2013, the company was engaged in a legal battle after two of its brokers left the company to join CBRE Group.

In August 2013, the company represented Bechtel in negotiating a 565,916 square foot lease renewal and expansion in Houston, Texas.

In 2014, the company was acquired by Savills for $280 million and the name of the company was changed to Savills Studley.

In June 2015, the company represented the seller in the sale of the St. Gregory Hotel & Suites hotel in Washington, D.C. to Hersha Hotels and Resorts for $57 million.

In September 2015, along with CBRE Group and JLL, the company was selected to represent the General Services Administration on negotiating new leases.

In November 2015, the company opened an office in Austin, Texas.

In December 2015, the company acquired Real Facilities, based in Toronto.

In January 2016, the company opened an office in Towson, Maryland.

In February 2017, the company represented Amtrak in negotiating a new lease near Washington Union Station.

In March 2019, the company underwent a rebranding and changed its name from Savills Studley to Savills.

In March 2020, the company acquired Macro Consultants LLC, a project management firm with offices in New York City and Philadelphia, and employees throughout the rest of the United States. Macro's Owner, Michael Glatt became Savills North American head of project management.

In January 2024, David Lipson became chief executive officer of Savills North America, while Mitchell Rudin became chairman.
