= Manipay =

Manipay மானிப்பாய் මනිපාය
- Town
- Location within Northern Province
- Coordinates: 9°43′0″N 80°0′0″E
- Country: Sri Lanka
- Province: Northern
- District: Jaffna
- DS Division: Valikamam South‐West

Manipay or Maanippaai (Tamil: மானிப்பாய்) is a town in the northern Jaffna District of Sri Lanka. The original name of Manipay is Periyapulam. It was a mission location when the American Ceylon Mission (ACM) came to Sri Lanka in the 19th century. Dr. Samuel Fisk Green founded the Green Memorial Hospital in 1864 in this village. It was also known as Manipai. There are number of schools in the village, some of which were founded by ACM. The 104-year-old Manipay Hindu College and the 53-year-old Manipay Hindu Ladies College, both High Schools, are prominent. The village also contains Hindu temples and churches. The Manipay Maruthady Pillaiyar Temple stands out.

Manipay is often referred to as the Colombo 7 of Jaffna as much of the Tamil community who had historically lived in the elite Cinnamon Gardens in Colombo originally hailed from Manipay.

== Famous Manipay Residents ==
Manipay has historically been the home or ancestral home of many significant individuals in Sri Lankan History. The town also housed a large number of powerful mudaliyars from the British colonial period. Such notable individuals include: Mudaliyar E. Nannithamby, father-in-law of Sir Ponnambalam Ramanathan and Mudaliyar Namasivayam, father-in-law of Ponnambalam Arunachalam. Other prominent personages hailing from Manipay who lived in the capital, Colombo, include: Sir Arunachalam Mahadeva, KCMG, The Honourable Justice Deshamanya V. Manicavasagar, James T. Rutnam, Nagalingam Shanmugathasan and The Honourable Justice Siva Selliah among numerous others.

== Notable people ==
- S. K. Lawton (1851–1919), Ceylonese photographer

== Velakkai Pillaiyar Temple ==
Velakkai Pillaiyar Temple is a Hindu Temple located in Manipay. The temple is dedicated to Lord Skanda and his elder brother Ganesha.
