= Samuel Fisk Green =

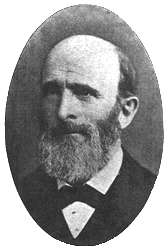
- Born: October 10, 1822; Worcester, Massachusetts
- Died: May 28, 1884 (aged 61); Green Hills, Massachusetts
- Occupations: Physician, missionary

Samuel Fisk Green (1822–1884) was an American medical missionary. He graduated from the College of Physicians and Surgeons in New York City. He served with the American Ceylon Mission (ACM) in Jaffna, Sri Lanka during the period (1847–1873) when it was the British colony of Ceylon. During his tenure he founded the Sri Lanka's first medical hospital and school in what later became the Green Memorial Hospital in Manipay in the Jaffna Peninsula. He translated and published over 4000 pages of medical literature from English to Tamil as part of his efforts to train doctors in their native language. He was personally responsible for training over 60 native doctors of whom majority had their instructions in Tamil.

== Early life ==
Green was born in Worcester, Massachusetts, to William E. Green and Julia Plimpton as the eighth of 11 children. After his secondary schooling, he was attracted to religion. In 1841 he went to New York City and joined the Protestant Episcopal Board of Missions. During this period he became interested in the medical profession and joined as a medical student and graduating as a doctor in 1845. In 1846, he joined the American Mission and along with a team of missionaries was sent to Ceylon now Sri Lanka. His brother was Andrew Haswell Green, who was instrumental in completing New York City's Central Park.

Green retired to Green Hills, Massachusetts in 1873 due to ill health. He died in 1884.

== Missionary work ==
After a four-month trip from America, he moved to Ceylon via Madras Presidency in British India in 1847. He initially served at the ACM mission at the Batticotta Seminary. Although the locals were reluctant use his services, eventually with his capability he became well known for his medical skills. As he attracted a lot of patients and it distracted Batticotta seminaries primary task of education, he was moved to another ACM mission station in Manipay in 1848. At Manipay, in addition to providing medical services to patients who came in search of him, he established the first medical school to teach western medicine to the Tamil people of Jaffna, thus opening, Sri Lanka's first medical hospital and teaching facility that became known as Green memorial hospital. Green Memorial Hospital was managed by the Jaffna Diocese of the Church of South India (JDCSI) the successor organization of ACM. It celebrated the 150th anniversary of the Green Memorial Hospital, and the ACM medical mission, in October 1998.

== Translating from English to Tamil ==
Initially when Dr. Green appealed for assistance for the publication of some medical books in Tamil, the colonial government refused aid. But after a decade, the same government doubled its aid and also requested Dr. Green to superintend the preparation and printing of Sanitary and Medical action related literature in Cholera times. Dr. Green wanted to prepare the trained physicians to stay in their native villages to help the locals instead migrating to find work within the colonial administration. To teach western medicine in Tamil, he had to coin technical terms in Tamil, translate western medical books into Tamil and write medical books in Tamil. This meant the development of medical and scientific Tamil as different from the established literary Tamil. There was also a need to write medical treatises in simple Tamil for the benefit of the common people – the layman.

== Bibliography ==
Following is a list of his Translations from English into Tamil and the year of publication.

Non-Fiction

- Cutter’s Anatomy, Physiology and Hygiene. 204 pages 1857
- Maunsell’s Obstetrics 258 pages 1857
- Druitt’s Surgery 504 pages 1867
- Gray’s Anatomy 838 pages 1872
- Hooper's Physician’s Vade Mecum 917 pages 1875
- Dalton’s Physiology 590 pages 1883
- Waring’s Pharmacopoeia of India 574 pages 1884
- Well’s Chemistry 516 pages 1875
