= Julien J. Studley =

Businessman

- Born: Julien Joseph Stuckgold; May 14, 1927; Brussels, Belgium
- Died: October 13, 2015 (aged 88); Manhattan, New York City, U.S.
- Occupation: Real estate broker
- Known for: Founder of Julien J. Studley Inc
- Spouse: Jane Studley
- Children: 1

Julien J. Studley (May 14, 1927 – October 13, 2015) was an American real estate broker and the founder of Julien J. Studley Inc brokerage firm (now Savills Studley).

== Early life ==
Studly was born as Julien Joseph Stuckgold to a Jewish family in Brussels, the son of Max and Marsha Stuckgold. His parents were both Jewish immigrants to Belgium from Poland. He had one younger brother George. In 1940, his family moved to France to escape the beginning of World War II and then moved to Cuba where he apprenticed as a diamond cutter. In 1943, his family moved to New York City, where they had relatives and changed their surname to "Studley."

He earned a high school equivalency diploma and first worked in the diamond business and then as an apprentice real estate salesman where his Yiddish helped to lease space in the Garment District.

== Career ==
In 1950, he was drafted into the United States National Guard where he served in a propaganda unit and upon his discharge, he took a job as a real estate broker with Brett, Wyckoff, Potter & Hamilton.

In 1954, after being fired for an unnamed incident, he obtained a broker's license and started his own commercial brokerage firm, Julien J. Studley Inc, which he operated out of his apartment. His firm acted as an exclusive agent for commercial tenants representing them in lease negotiations with landlords and developers.

In 2002, he sold the company, then with over 400 brokers and 25 offices, for $20 million to associate members of the firm and founded his own real estate investment and management firm, Studley New Vista Associates. In 1963, Studley published the Studley Report, a monthly newsletter which provided a real time summary of all available office space in Manhattan.

In 2014, Savills purchased Studley Inc for $260 million, renaming it to Savills Studley.

== Philanthropy ==
Studley was granted an honorary degree from the City University of New York and served as chairman of the New School where he funded the Julien J. Studley Graduate Program in International Affairs at The New School. He was also a prominent donor to the City University Graduate Center and Lincoln Center for the Performing Arts and its Film Society.

== Personal life ==
In 1976, he married his first wife, who was thirty years his junior; they had a son Jacob but soon divorced. He then married to Jane Studley with whom he has a stepson, Ni Jun.

A book by Peter Hellman Shaping the Skyline: The World According to Real Estate Visionary Julien Studley chronicled his life.
