= Nallur, Kanyakumari =

Nallur (Nalloor)
- Town
- Location in Tamil Nadu, India
- Coordinates: 8.29613°N 77.21747°E
- Country: India
- State: Tamil Nadu
- District: Kanniyakumari

Area
  - Total: 8.50 km^{2} (3.28 sq mi)

Population (2011)
  - Total: 17,989
  - Density: 2,116.4/km^{2} (5,481/sq mi)

Languages
  - Official: Tamil
- Time zone: UTC+5:30 (IST)
- Postal code: 629165
- Vehicle registration: TN-75

Nallur (Nalloor) is a panchayat town in Kanniyakumari district in the Indian state of Tamil Nadu.

Nalloor Town Panchayat city in district of Kanniyakumari, Tamil Nadu. The Nalloor city is divided into 18 wards for which elections are held every 5 years.

== Geography ==
Nallur is located at 8.29613°N 77.21749°E

== Demographics ==
As of 2001 India census, Nallur had a population of 15,563. Males constitute 50% of the population and females 50%. Nallur has an average literacy rate of 78%, higher than the national average of 59.5%: male literacy is 82%, and female literacy is 74%. In Nallur, 11% of the population is under 6 years of age.

As of 2011 census, Nalloor Town Panchayat has population of 17,989 of which 8,985 are males while 9,004 are females as per report released by Census India 2011.

The population of children aged 0-6 is 1721 which is 9.57% of total population of Nalloor (TP). In Nalloor Town Panchayat, the female sex ratio is 1002 against state average of 996. Moreover, the child sex ratio in Nalloor is around 921 compared to Tamil Nadu state average of 943. The literacy rate of Nalloor city is 92.35% higher than the state average of 80.09%. In Nalloor, male literacy is around 94.97% while the female literacy rate is 89.77%.

Nalloor Town Panchayat has total administration over 4,480 houses to which it supplies basic amenities like water and sewerage. It is also authorized to build roads within Town Panchayat limits and impose taxes on properties coming under its jurisdiction.

== Religion ==
Hinduism consists 55.42% of the population, with Christianity consisting 42.77%, Islam consisting 1.65%, and others consisting 1.81%.

Religions in Nalloor
Religion	Percent
Hinduism	55.42%
Christianity	42.77%
Islam	1.65%
Others	1.81%

== See also ==
- Karavilai
- Kuzhithurai Railway Station
- Marthandam
