= Karavilai =

- Village
- Location within Tamil Nadu
- Coordinates: 8.29613°N 77.21749°E
- Country: India
- State: Tamil Nadu
- District: Kanyakumari

Languages
  - Official: Tamil
- Time zone: UTC+5:30 (IST)
- PIN: 629165
- Telephone code: 04651
- Vehicle registration: TN-75
- Nearby Cities: Marthandam & Nagercoil & Trivandrum
- Lok Sabha constituency: Kanyakumari
- Vidhan Sabha constituency: Vilavancode
- Literacy: 100%

Karavilai is a place in Marthandam in Kanniyakumari district in the Indian state of Tamil Nadu. Karavilai comes under town panchayat of Nallur (Nalloor), Kanyakumari District. The area is full of greenery and there is passage of shallow of water in the region. Soil found around Marthandam is one of the most fertile lands of Tamil Nadu and the region has the climatic conditions of Kerala.

Tamil is the official language of this region however, most of the people understand Malayalam since it is located neighbouring Kerala.

== Geography ==
Area is full of greenery consist of banana, rubber, coconut plantations etc.

== Climate ==
Climate data for Karavilai
Month	Jan	Feb	Mar	Apr	May	Jun	Jul	Aug	Sep	Oct	Nov	Dec	Year
Mean daily maximum °C (°F)	27 (81)	28 (82)	30 (86)	31 (88)	32 (90)	31 (88)	31 (88)	30 (86)	30 (86)	29 (84)	28 (82)	27 (81)	30 (85)
Mean daily minimum °C (°F)	22 (72)	22 (72)	23 (73)	24 (75)	25 (77)	23 (73)	23 (73)	23 (73)	23 (73)	22 (72)	21 (70)	21 (70)	23 (73)

== Transport ==
=== Roadways ===
This place has bus services from Marthandam. Road from Karavilai connect with nearby places such as Pallanvilai, Karavilaagam, and Marthandam.

Nearby Bus Stand is the Marthandam New Bus Stand Which is at a distance of 2 km from Karavilai.

=== Air ===
The nearest airport is Thiruvananthapuram (Trivandrum) International Airport which is 40 km from Karavilai.

=== Railways ===
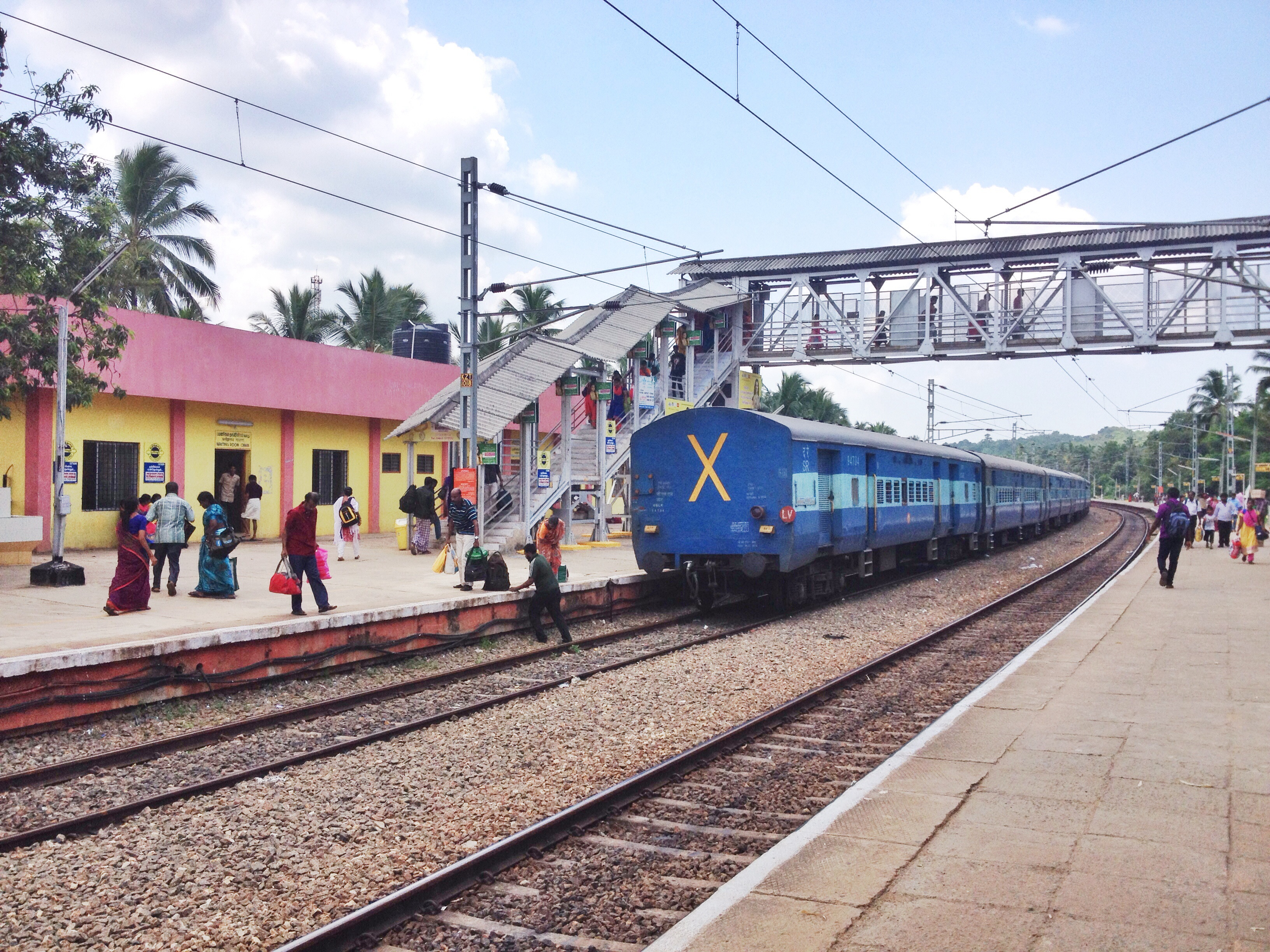
Kuzhithurai (Marthandam) Railway Station.

Kuzhithurai (Marthandam) railway station is situated at a distance of 1.5 km from Karavilai. This railway station collection is more than seven crore per annum and a daily passenger patronage of more than 50,000 people. The station has two platforms and falls on the Kanyakumari—Trivandrum line in the Trivandrum Division of the Southern Railway zone. Most of all daily trains passing through the station halts in Kuzhithurai station.

Daily Passenger trains to Nagercoil, Trivandrum, Kanyakumari, Tirunelveli, Madurai, Kottayam and Kollem. It has direct trains for Chennai, Madurai, Trivandrum, Bangalore, Jammu, Mumbai C.S.T etc.

== Religion ==
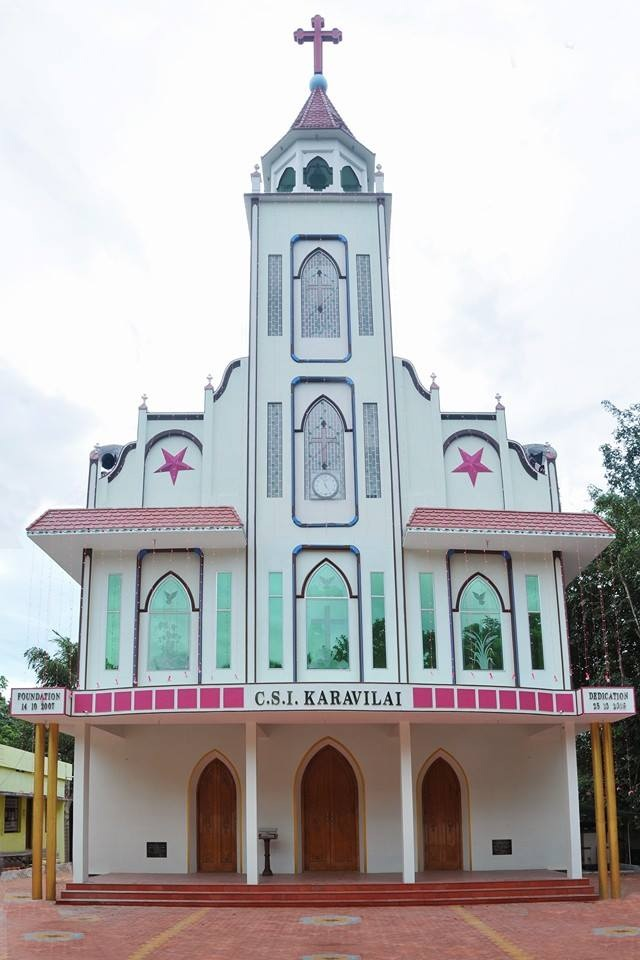
C.S.I Church, Karavilai

The town has 2 churches. C.S.I Church, Karavilai. and Kirubasanam Church of Christ, Karavilai. TPM Church, Bethel Street, Marthandam; which is 2 km from Karavilai.

== Landmarks ==
- Primary Agriculture Co-operative Credit Society, Karavilai.
- Government Public Library, Karavilai. Government library with good collection of books, magazines and Tamil daily newspapers is available.
- MARK Cashew Nut Factory, Karavilai.
- Govt. Higher Secondary School, Nalloor (Nallur), which is 1 km apart.
- Tip Top Tailors, Karavilai.
- Neduvaali Pond, Karavilai.

== Sports ==
Cricket is the most popular game here. Games such as Volleyball, Kabaddi, Goli also played here.

== Photo gallery ==
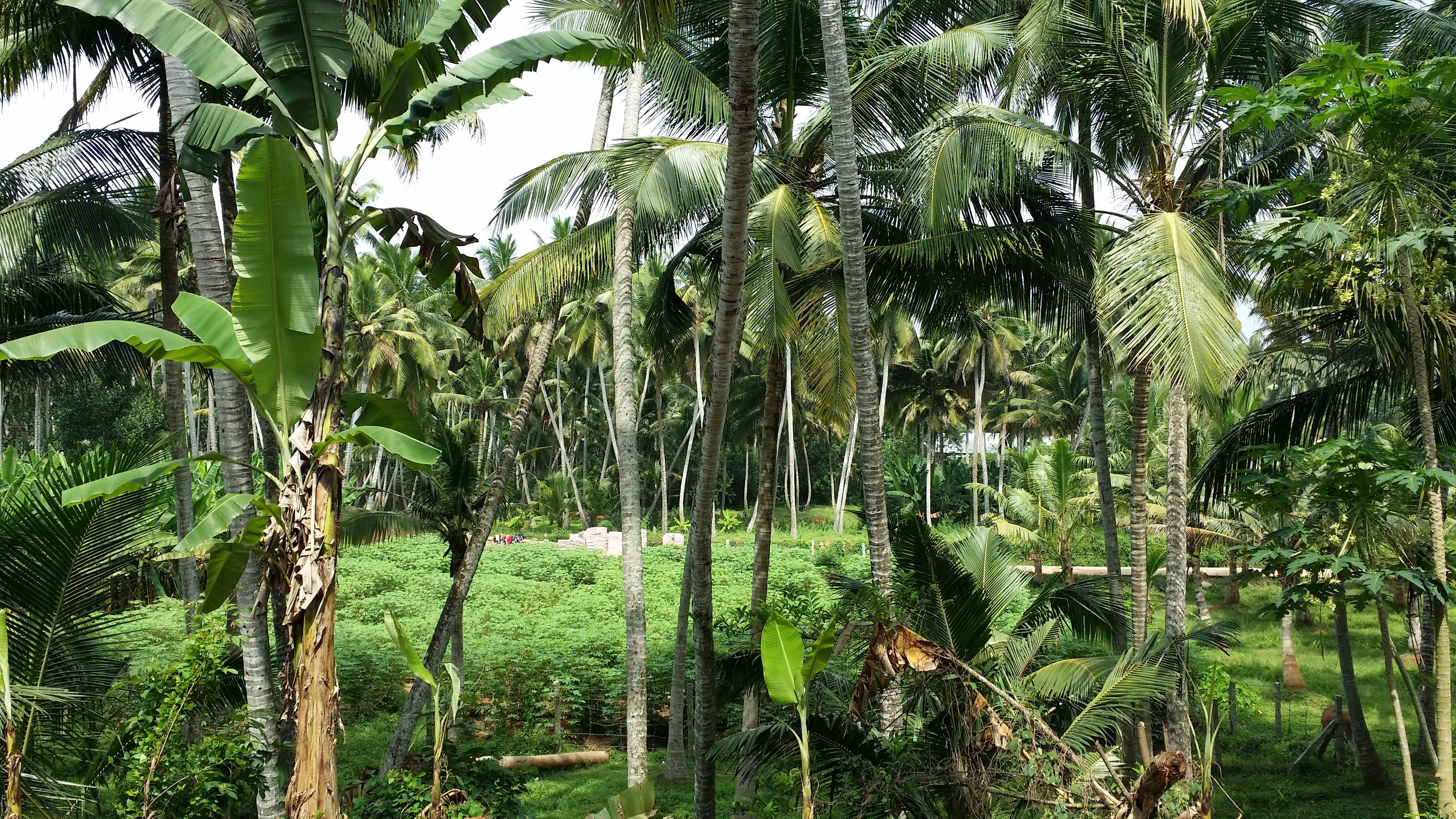
Greenery Scene of Coconut Plantations in Karavilai

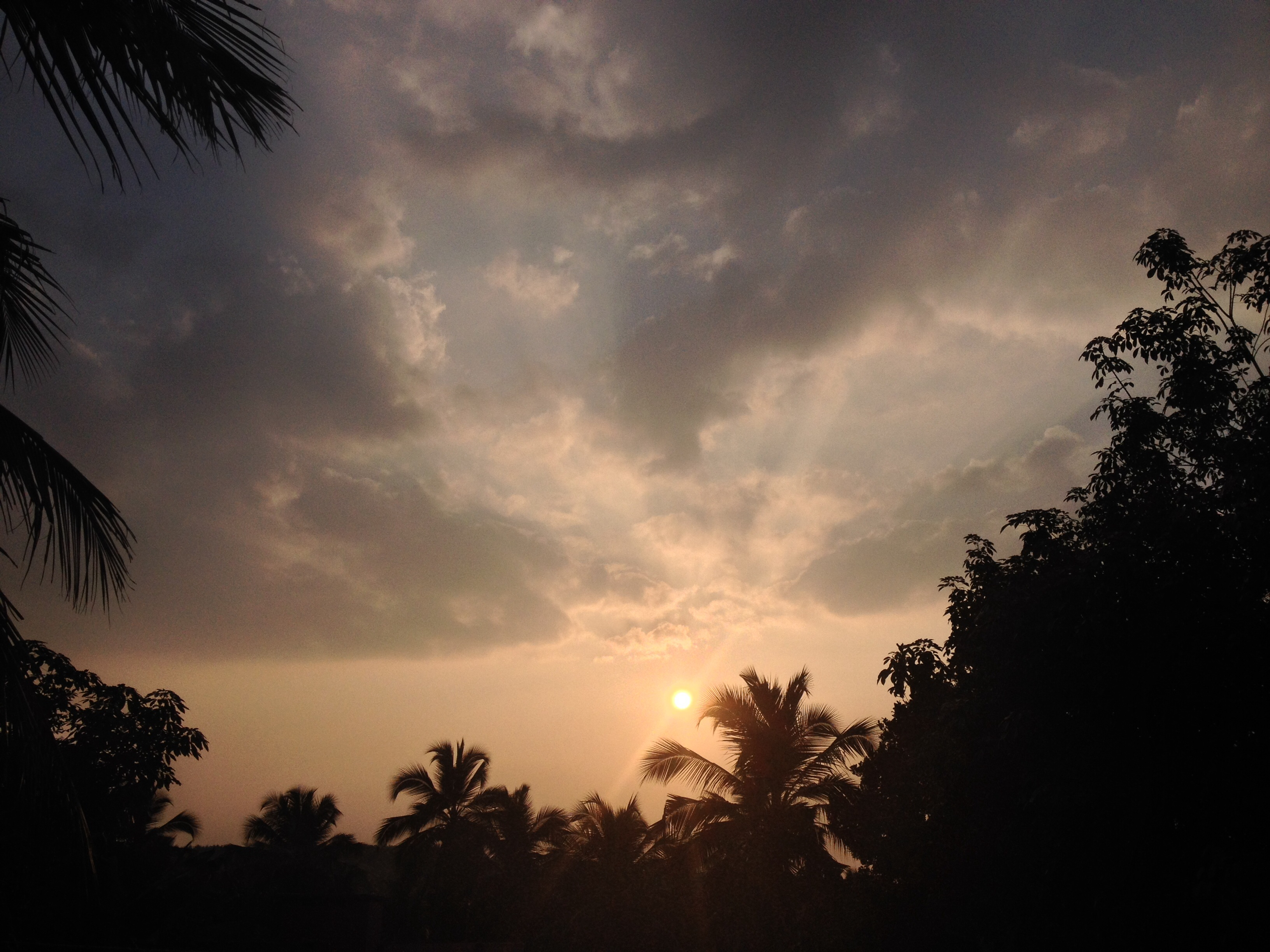
Sunset seen from Karavilai

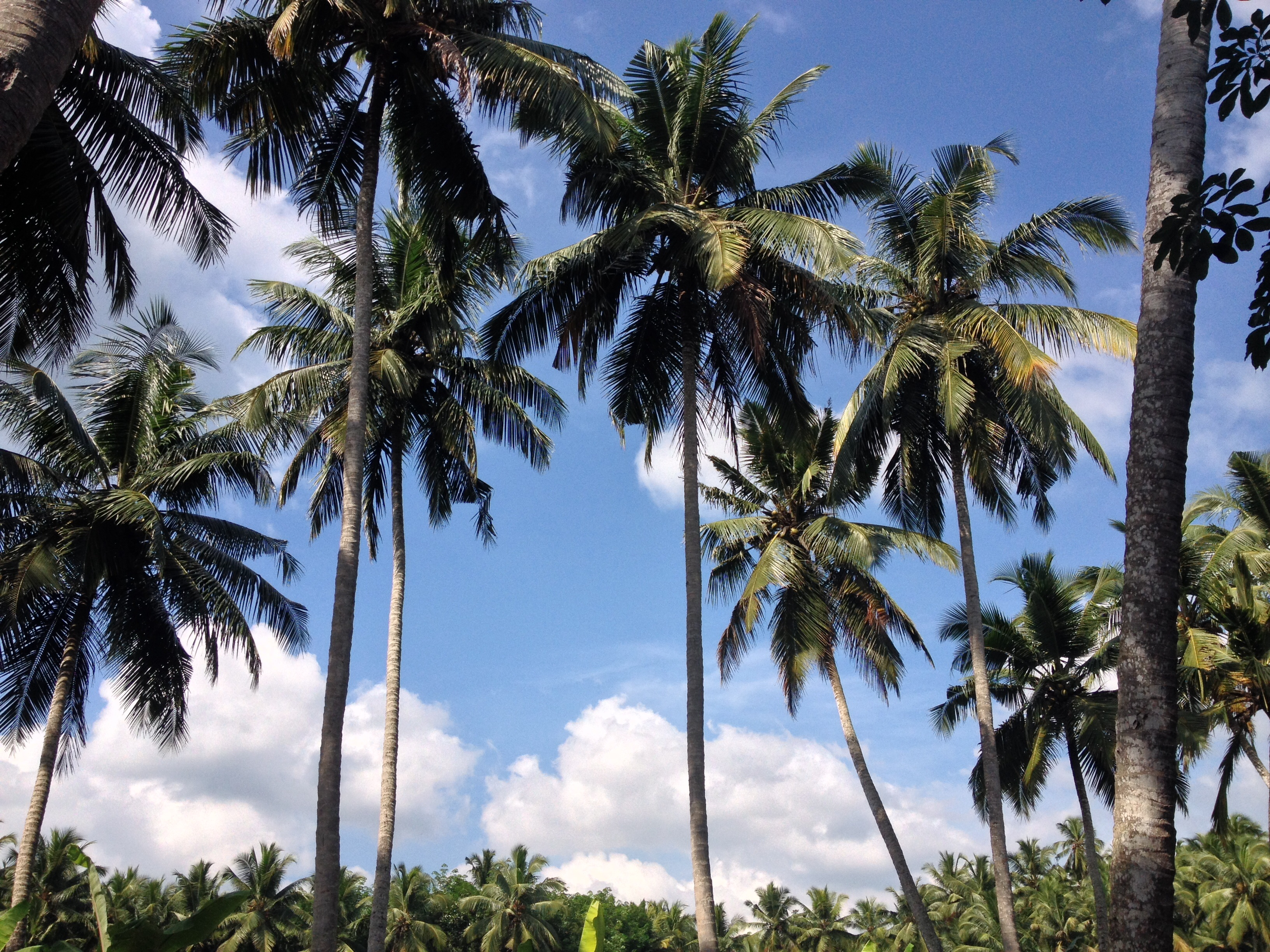
Coconut trees seen across Karavilai

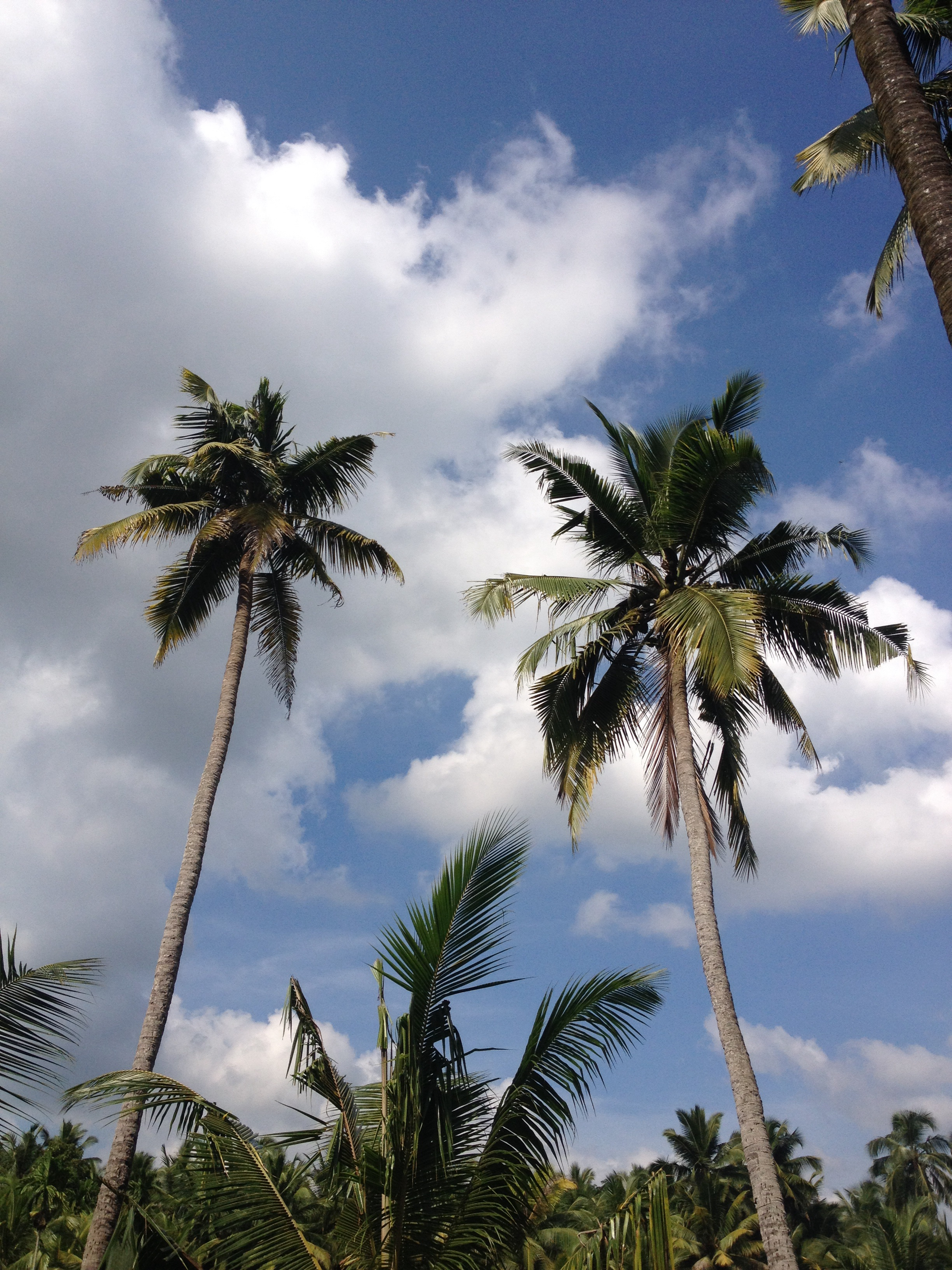
Twin Coconut trees standing up seeing the blue sky

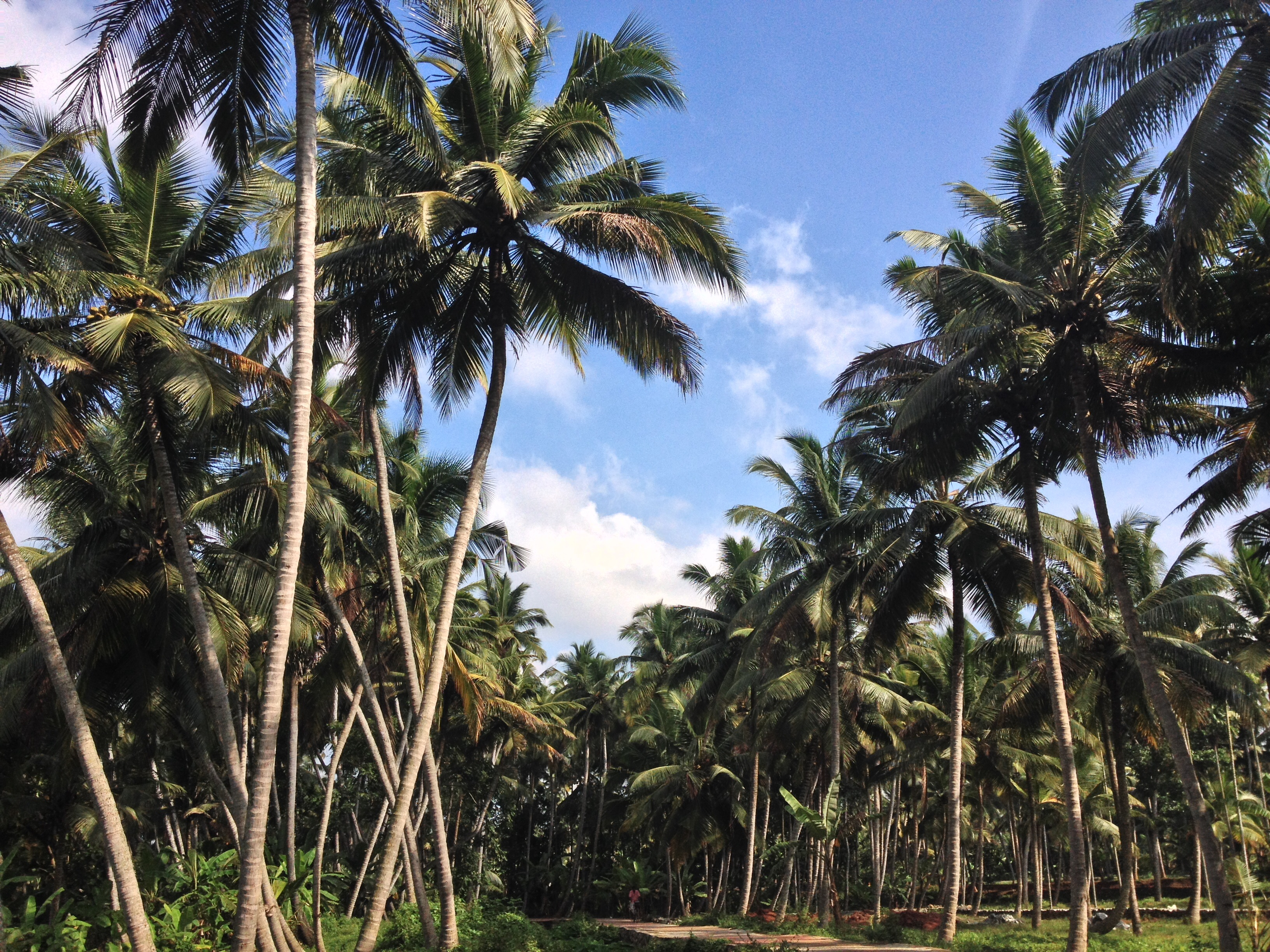
Coconut trees grown denser around this region

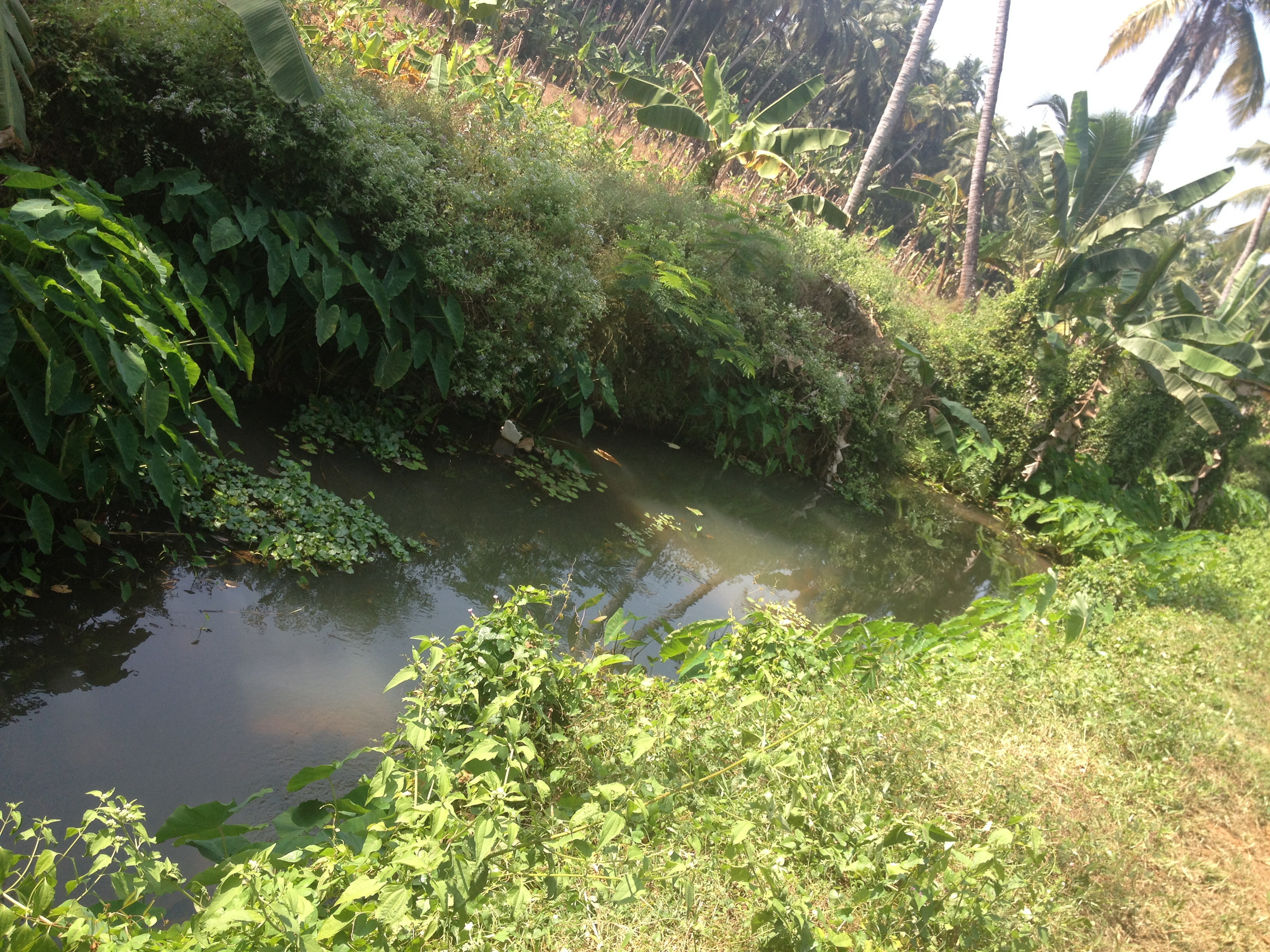
Shallow stream in Karavilai

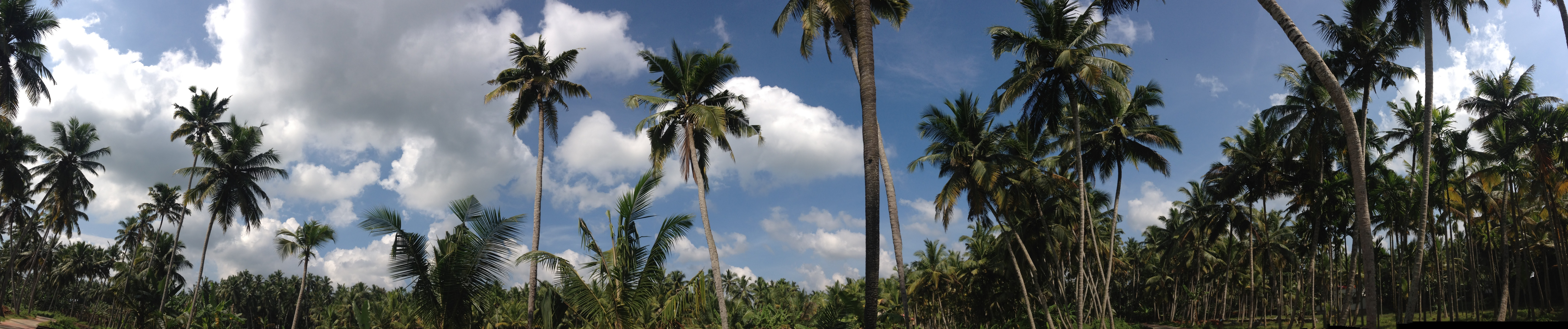
Panoramic view of coconut plantations backed by blue skies

== See also ==
- Kuzhithurai Railway Station
- Marthandam
- Nallur, Kanyakumari
