= Sri Lanka Journalism Awards for Excellence =

The Sri Lanka Journalism Awards for Excellence is an awards ceremony held annually in Sri Lanka to recognize the achievements of print media journalists working in the country’s three main languages – Sinhala, Tamil and English.

It is the biggest print media awards programme in the country and is the only independent print media awards ceremony that has no affiliations or obligations to the government or any private institutions.

In addition to awarding the top achievers of several categories in the print media each year, it also honours those who have served the journalistic profession for more than 40 years with Lifetime Achievement Awards.

Each winner receives a trophy made in the shape of the nib of a fountain pen and a certificate. Applicants who do not win a category but have satisfied the standards set by the panel of judges receive merit awards which are only certificates.

No cash or other prizes and incentives are offered to the winners. In some years, the winners received other gifts such as mobile phones or tablets along with their awards.

== History ==
The Journalism Awards Programme was inaugurated in 1999 by The Editors’ Guild of Sri Lanka (TEGOSL) following the “Colombo Declaration on Media Freedom and Social Responsibility.”

In 2004, the Sri Lanka Press Institute (SLPI) was established and from then on, the Awards Night was jointly organized by TEGOSL and the SLPI.

The inaugural ceremony was held at TransAsia Hotel in Colombo. After that, the ceremony moved to Mount Lavinia Hotel which became a co-sponsor of the event and became the host for every ceremony after that. Usually, the ceremony is held in the last week of July every year.

== Entry and prize considerations ==
The Journalism Awards for Excellence programme does not automatically consider all applicable works in media. All interested candidates are invited every year to apply for an award in a category of their choice. Generally, the entries close in the last week of March every year.

To be considered for an award, the qualifying work should have been published in a Sri Lankan newspaper between January 1 and December 31 of the preceding year.

To qualify for awards, the applicant should be a full-time journalist, a journalism student doing an internship or someone who had a minimum of ten articles published in a newspaper during the previous calendar year.

The organisers announce the application deadline in media and also on the Sri Lanka Press Institute website.

Along with the newspaper articles, candidates are required to submit an application form which can be downloaded from the Sri Lanka Press Institute website.

The organisers appoint a panel of judges every year and this panel is allowed to meet and consider the entries independently.

There is no competitive process or an involvement of the judges for three of the main award categories. These “Special Awards” are conferred by the TEGSOL as determined by them. The Special Awards categories are; “D. R. Wijewardene Award for Earning the Appreciation of Peers and the Public”, “Sepala Gunasena Award for Defending Press Freedom in Sri Lanka” and “Long and Distinguished Service”.

== Changes in Award categories ==
The award categories have changed over the years. Some new categories have been introduced; some categories have been abandoned while some categories have undergone changes to the name of the category.

From 2000 to 2006, there were three separate awards named D.B. Dhanapala award for Best Journalist in Sinhala Language, D. B. Dhanapala award for Best Journalist in Tamil Language and D. B. Dhanapala award for Best Journalist in English Language. This was in addition to the main award Mervyn de Silva Award for Journalist of the Year. But D.B. Dhanapala Awards were abandoned in 2006.

The Upali Wijewardene Award for Human Interest Reporting category underwent a change of name to Upali Wijewardene Award for Feature writer of the year after the first two years.

Best Environmental Reporter of The Year was initially known as the Best Environmental Report of the Year.

D. B. Dhanapala Award for the Scoop of the Year later shed “D. B. Dhanapala Award” from its category title, and is now known as the “Scoop of the Year”

A significant new category for Investigative Journalist of the Year was introduced in 2008, while a new category for news websites was introduced from 2016. Best Health Care and Medical Reporter category was introduced in 2017.

An award for Best TV News Story was offered in 2007 but was abandoned after that.

Several Award categories started as one main award but were later divided into three language categories later.

== Controversies ==
Journalists of the Leader Group of Publications which published the newspapers The Sunday Leader, The Morning Leader and Irudina boycotted the 2003 programme to show solidarity with one of their colleagues Frederica Jansz alleging that Jansz had to face harassment from the Editors’ Guild of Sri Lanka regarding her application. Incidentally, Jansz won the top award – “Mervyn de Silva Award for Journalist of the Year” at the following year’s edition of the programme.

Then in 2007, the Leader Group claimed that a new regulation introduced by the organisers forced them out of contention for awards. The newspaper published an article alleging that the new regulation made it mandatory for all applications to be endorsed by the editor of the publication to the fact that the applicant subscribed to the Code of Ethics of the Editors’ Guild and the Press Complaints Commission of Sri Lanka.

All editors of the group including The Sunday Leader Editor Lasantha Wickrematunge were not members of the Editors’ Guild and did not subscribe to the Press Complaints Commission or the mandate of the Sri Lanka Press Institute. It effectively meant that the journalists of the Group were not eligible to apply for awards.

Interestingly, until that year, The Sunday Leader was one of the most successful publications at the awards programme producing the winner of Journalist of the Year Award every year except in 1998 and 2001. (They boycotted the event in 2003).

Two years later, journalists from the Leader Group of Publications resumed taking part in the programme as some regulations were changed. Wickrematunge was assassinated in 2009.

== Multiple award winning journalists (more than four) ==
- 9 – Sonali Samarasinghe (The Sunday Leader) – Mervyn de Silva Journalist of the Year 2000, 2001, 2005, 2006, D. B. Dhanapala Award for Best Journalist of the Year - English Language Press 2000, Scoop of the Year 1998, 2000, 2006, B. A. Siriwardene Award for the Columnist of the Year (English) 2006
- 7 – Ranee Mohamed (The Sunday Leader) - D. B. Dhanapala Award for Best Journalist of the Year - English Language Press 2006, D.R. Wijewardene Award for Earning the Appreciation of His/Her Peers and the General Public 2000, 2002, Upali Wijewardene Award for Feature Writer of The Year 2001, (English) 2009, Upali Wijewardene Award for Human Interest Reporting 1998, 1999
- 7 – Channaka de Silva (Daily Mirror) – Scoop of the Year 2012, Sports Journalist of the Year 2008, 2009, 2010, 2011, 2012, 2013
- 6 - Robert Antony (Virakesari) - Upali Wijewardene Award for Feature Writer of The Year (Tamil) 2015, 2017, 2018 Business Journalist of the Year (Tamil) 2012, 2014, 2016
- 6- R.Ramkumar {Virakesari News Paper} - "MERVYN DE SILVA” BEST JOURNALIST OF THE YEAR 2018, Prof. K. Kailasapathy award for reporting under special circumstances 2021, BEST ENVIROMENTEL JOURNALIST OF THE YEAR 2023, BEST ENVIROMENTEL JOURNALIST OF THE YEAR 2022,BEST FEATURE Writer OF THE YEAR 2020, BEST COLUMNIST OF THE YEAR 2016
- 5 – K. Sanjeewa (Ravaya) - Mervyn de Silva Journalist of the Year 2014, 2015, 2016, 2017, Subramaniam Chettiar Social Development Reporter of the Year 2014
- 5 – Namini Wijedasa (Lakbima News, The Island, The Sunday Times) - Mervyn de Silva Journalist of the Year 2009, D.R. Wijewardene Award for Earning the Appreciation of His/Her Peers and the General Public 2005, 2016, B. A. Siriwardene Award for the Columnist of the Year (English) 2004, Investigative Journalist of the Year 2015
- 5 - Dharisha Bastians (The Nation/ Daily FT/Daily Mirror) - Mervyn de Silva Journalist of the Year 2007, 2013, Upali Wijewardene Award for Feature Writer of The Year (English) 2006, B. A. Siriwardene Award for the Columnist of the Year (English) 2013, Denzil Peiris Young Reporter of the Year 2005
- 5 – Wimalanath Weeraratne (Ravaya) - B. A. Siriwardene Award for the Columnist of the Year (Sinhala) 2010, 2011, 2012, 2013, 2014
- 4 – Ranjith Ananda Jayasinghe (Lankadeepa/Irida Lankadeepa) - Mervyn de Silva Journalist of the Year 2001, D. B. Dhanapala Award for Best Journalist of the Year - Sinhala Language Press 2000, 2001, Scoop of the Year 2003
- 4 – Dilrukshi Handunnetti (The Sunday Leader/Ceylon Today/The Sunday Times) - Mervyn de Silva Journalist of the Year 2012, D. B. Dhanapala Award for Best Journalist of the Year - English Language Press 2005, Denzil Peiris Young Reporter of the Year 2000, Best Environmental Report of the Year 2001
- 4 – Chandani Kirinde (The Sunday Times) - Upali Wijewardene Award for Feature Writer of The Year (English) 2010, 2015, B. A. Siriwardene Award for the Columnist of the Year (English) 2009, 2011
- 4 – Awantha Artigala (Daily Mirror) – Cartoonist of the Year 2010, 2012, 2013, 2014
- 4 - Mandana Ismail Abeywickrema (The Sunday Leader) - B. A. Siriwardene Award for the Columnist of the Year 2012, Investigative Journalist of the Year 2009, Business Journalist of the Year (English) 2005, 2006

== Main awards ==
The winners of all award ceremonies held in 1999, 2000, 2001, 2002, 2003, 2004, 2005, 2006, 2007, 2008, 2009, 2010, 2011, 2012, 2013, 2014, 2015, 2016, 2017, 2018 and 2019 have been listed below.

=== Long Service to journalism ===
Year	Winners
1998	M.A. Wimal
1999	(Sinhala) Siriwardene Subasinghe (Tamil) Sinniah Gurunathan (English) Clarence Fernando
2000	(Sinhala) M. A. de Silva (Tamil) P. A. Sivam (English) D. B. Udalagama
2001	Benedict Dodampegama David Rajhu Roshan Peiris
2002	Dalton de Silva Edwin Ariyadasa D.F. Kariyakarawana Jiffry Yoonus Annaluxmy Rajadurai
2003	W. R. Wijesoma L. E. Samararatne Elmo Gooneratne T. M. Murugiah S. Pathiravithana
2005	W V Abeygunawardhana Motagedara Wanigaratna Hema Gunawardhana Lesley Dahanayake A Sivanesaselvan
2007	M.J.M. Zarook D.C. Ranatunga Sriya Ratnakara, N.R.J. Aaron K.T. Sivagurunathan
2008	Anula de Silva P. Balasingham Louis Benedict Thalangama Jayasinha S. Shanmugarajah
2009	Anandi Balasingham Srilal Kodikara Arthur U. Amarasena M. V. Kaanamylnathan M. S. M. Mansoor
2010	Lloyd Rajaratnam Devaraj S. M. Gopalaratnam Bandula Harischandra Sarath Cooray
2011	D. C. A. (Bernie) Wijesekera Kandiah Nithyananda Sybil Wettasinghe S. Hewage Chithrananda Sunil Madawa Premathilaka
2012	Edmund Ranasinghe Dunstan Wickramaratne S. Piyasena N. Padmaseelan Carol Aloysius Camillus Perera
2013	Ajantha Ranasinghe Soloman Ranasinghe Anne Abeysekera Bandu S Kodikara Rasiah Selvarajah
2014	Binoy Kumar Wickrama Surendra Latheef Farook Nihal Ratnaike Saranapala Pamunuwa S.Thillainathan
2015	Piyasena Ihalavithana Veeragathy Thanabalasingham Sarath Malalasekera Premasiri Abeysinghe Neville de Silva
2016	Widana Gamage Gunerathne Lakshman Jayawardena S. A. C. M. Kuwaldeen Palavasam Panneer Selvam Gaston de Rosayro
2017	A.S. Fernando Cyril Wimalasurendre Merrill Perera Sinniah Kanesan A.L.M. Saleem
2018	Dudley Jansz L.B. Senaratne Tillakaratne Kuruvita Bandara A.L.K. Perera Kopalapillai Thiruketharanathan

=== Mervyn de Silva Award for Journalist of the Year ===
Year	Winner	Newspaper
1998	Iqbal Athas	The Sunday Times
1999	Sonali Samarasinghe	The Sunday Leader
2000	Sonali Samarasinghe	The Sunday Leader
2001	Ranjith Ananda Jayasinghe	Lankadeepa
2002	Amantha Perera	The Sunday Leader
2003	Kumudini Hettiarchchi	The Sunday Times
2004	Frederica Jansz	The Sunday Leader
2005	Sonali Samarasinghe	The Sunday Leader
2006	Sonali Samarasinghe	The Sunday Leader
2007	Dharisha Bastians	The Nation
2008	Not Awarded	
2009	Namini Wijedasa	Lakbimanews
2010	Gayan Kumara Weerasinghe	Lakbima/ Lakbimanews
2011	Lasantha Weerakulasuriya	Lakbima
2012	Dilrukshi Handunnetti	Ceylon Today
2013	Dharisha Bastians	Daily FT
2014	K. Sanjeewa	Ravaya
2015	K. Sanjeewa	Ravaya
2016	K. Sanjeewa	Ravaya
2017	K. Sanjeewa	Ravaya
2018	R. Ramkumar	Virakesari

=== D. B. Dhanapala Award for Journalist of the Year ===
Year	Winner	Newspaper
2000	(Sinhala) Ranjith Ananda Jayasinghe (English) Sonali Samarasinghe (Tamil) Not Awarded	Lankadeepa The Sunday Leader -
2001	(Sinhala) Ranjith Ananda Jayasinghe (English) Amantha Perera (Tamil) Not Awarded	Lankadeepa The Sunday Leader -
2002	(Sinhala) Not Awarded (English) Not Awarded (Tamil) Not Awarded	
2003	(Sinhala) Asuntha Siwemini Edirisuriya (English) Chris Kamalendran (Tamil) Krishni Ifham Kanthasamy	Lakbima The Sunday Times Virakesari
2004	(Sinhala)Lasantha Ruhunage (English) Frederica Jansz (Tamil) Visu Karnanithi	Ravaya The Sunday Leader Thinakaran
2005	(Sinhala) Not awarded (English) Dilrukshi Handunnetti (Tamil) Krishni Ifham Kanthasamy	- The Sunday Leader Virakesari
2006	(Sinhala) Janiytha Seneviratne (English) Ranee Mohamed (Tamil) Somasekaran Jeyamurale	Divaina The Sunday Leader Thinakkural

=== D.R. Wijewardene Award for Earning the Appreciation of Peers and the General Public ===
Year	Winner	Newspaper
1998	Pradeep Kumar	Dinamina
1999	The Photo Journalists' Association of Sri Lanka	
2000	Ranee Mohamed	The Sunday Leader
2001	Neville de Silva	The Sunday Times
2002	Ranee Mohamed	The Sunday Leader
2003	Poddala Jayantha	Silumina
2005	Namini Wijedasa	The Island
2006	Dharmeratnam Sivaram (Posthumous)	
2007	Chandrabose Suthagar (Posthumous) Selvarajah Rajivarman (Posthumous) Nilakshan Sahadevan (Posthumous) W. Gunasinghe	
2008	Rashmi Mohammed (Posthumous)	Sirasa
2009	Iqbal Athas	The Sunday Times
2010	Not Awarded	
2011	Nuwan Gankanda	Irida Lakbima
2012	‘Punchi Putha’ - Ryp Van Winkle	The Sunday Times
2013	Kishali Pinto Jayawardene	
2014	Victor Ivan	
2015	All those who campaigned for the RTI (Right To Information) Law	
2016	Namini Wijedasa	The Sunday Times
2017	K.W. Janaranjana	
2018	Manik de Silva	

=== Upali Wijewardene Award for Human Interest Reporting ===
Year	Winner	Newspaper
1998	Ranee Mohamed	The Sunday Leader
1999	Ranee Mohamed	The Sunday Leader

=== Upali Wijewardene Award for Feature Writer of The Year ===
Year	Winner	Newspaper
2000	Daminda Jeevan Ranasinghe	Lakbima
2001	Ranee Mohamed	The Sunday Leader
2002	(English) Kumudini Hettiarachchi (Sinhala) Not Awarded (Tamil) Not Awarded	The Sunday Times - -
2003	(Sinhala) Tissa Ravindra Perera (Sinhala) D. Nihal P. Abeysinghe (English) Not Awarded (Tamil) Not Awarded	Lakbima Silumina - -
2004	(Sinhala) W. A. Inoka Perera Bandara (Sinhala) Prasanna Sanjeewa Tennakoon (English) Priyanwada Ranawaka (English) Renu Warnasuriya (Tamil) Kanaganayagam Valethanchan	Silumina Irida Lankadeepa The Sunday Times The Sunday Times Free Lance Journalist
2005	(Sinhala) Lasantha Ruhunage (English) Jamila Najmuddin (Tamil) Arasaratnam Rajeevan	Ravaya The Sunday Leader Thinakkural
2006	(Sinhala) P. M. Senaratne (English) Dharisha Bastians (Tamil) Not Awarded	Mawbima The Nation -
2007	(Sinhala) Sanjeewika Samarathunga (English) Rathindra Kuruwita (Tamil) Niranjalee Roland	Irida Lankadeepa The Nation Virakesari
2008	(Sinhala) Sanda Laalith Ranasinghe (Tamil) Niranjani Roland (English) Randima Atygalle	Silumina Metro News The Nation
2009	(Sinhala) Udani Wijesundara (Tamil) Balasubramaniam Kirubharan (English) Ranee Mohamed	Irida Lakbima Thinakkural The Sunday Leader
2010	(Sinhala) Prasad Bandara Wijekoon (Tamil) Balasubramaniam Kirubaharan (English) Chandani Kirinde	Ravaya Thinakkural Weekly The Sunday Times
2011	(Sinhala) Mihiri Fonseka (Tamil) Mohamed Hussain Fathima Husna (English) Nadia Fazlulhaq	Lakbima Thinakkural The Sunday Times
2012	(Sinhala) Kasun Amila Pussawela (English) Smriti Daniel (Tamil) Logeswaran Thushikaran	Ravaya The Sunday Times Uthayan
2013	(Sinhala) Daya Neththasinghe (English) Randima Attygalle (Tamil) A Jayasooriyan	Lanka The Sunday Island Sunday Thinakkural
2014	(Sinhala) Ruwan Jayawardane (English) Randima Attygalle (Tamil) Alagan Kanagaraj	Irida Divaina Sunday Island Tamil Mirror
2015	(Sinhala) Tharanga Rathnaweera (Tamil) I. Robert Antony (English) Chandani Kirinde	Irida Divaina Virakesari The Sunday Times
2016	(Sinhala) S. G. Punchihewa (Tamil) R. Ramkumar (English) Don Manu	Ravaya Virakesari Daily The Sunday Times
2017	(Sinhala) Tharanga Rathnaweera (Tamil) I. Robert Antony (English) Sanju Sirimal Hathurusinghe	Irida Divaina Virakesari Ceylon Today
2018	(Sinhala) Tharanga Rathnaweera (Tamil) I. Robert Antony (English) Sanju Sirimal Hathurusinghe	Irida Divaina Virakesari Ceylon Today

=== B. A. Siriwardene Award for Columnist of the Year ===
Year	Winner	Newspaper
2000	Harith Gunawardena (King Barnett)	Irida Divaina
2001	Iqbal Athas (Situation Report)	The Sunday Times
2002	Harith Gunawardena (King Barnett)	Irida Divaina
2003	Rajpal Abeynayake	The Sunday Times
2004	(Sinhala)Rajapaksa (English) Keith Noyahr (English) Namini Wijedasa (Tamil) P. Shanmuganathan	Irudina Daily Mirror The Island Freelance Journalist
2005	(English) D B S Jeyaraj (Minor Matters) (Tamil) P Mahendraraja (Sinhala) Not Awarded	The Morning Leader Thinakkural -
2006	(Sinhala) Editor (Sinhala) Thimbiriyagama Bandara (Tamil) Mohamed Nawas M. Anas (English) Sonali Samarasinghe	Rivira Irida Sangrahaya Ravaya Thinakural The Sunday Leader
2007	(Sinhala) Thimbiriyagama Bandara (English) K.S. Sivakumaran (Tamil) Balasubramaniyam Kirubaharan	Ravaya The Island Thinakkural
2008	(Sinhala) Not awarded (Tamil) B. Kirubaharan (English) Nanda Wanasundere	- Thinakkural The Sunday Island
2009	(Sinhala) Amarasiri Wickramaratne (Tamil) Ayakkannu Titokugan (English) Chandani Kirinde	Lanka Thinakkural The Sunday Times
2010	(Sinhala) Wimalanath Weerarathna (Tamil) S. Jithendra Prasath (English) D. B. S. Jeyaraj	Ravaya Virakesari Weekly Daily Mirror
2011	(Sinhala) Wimalanath Weerarathne (Tamil) P A Aswin Sutharson (English) Chandani Kirinde	Ravaya Yarlosai Weekly The Sunday Times
2012	(Sinhala) Wimalanath Weerarathna (Sinhala) C. J. Amarathunga (English) Mandana Ismail Abeywickrema (Tamil) Abdul Raheem Abdul Fareel	Ravaya Irida Lankadeepa The Sunday Leader Vidiwelli
2013	(Sinhala) Wimalanath Weerarathne (English) Dharisha Bastians (Tamil) Muttiah Masilamany	Ravaya Daily FT Uthayan
2014	(Sinhala) Wimalanath Weerathne (Tamil) Sinthuja Prasath (English) Not Awarded	Ravaya Daily Virakesari -
2015	(Sinhala) Narada Karunatilaka (Tamil) Kanagalingam Gopikrishna (English) Padma Edirisinghe	Sunday Rivira Tamil Mirror The Sunday Observer
2016	(Sinhala) S. G. Punchihewa (Tamil) R. Ramkumar (English) Don Manu	Ravaya Virakesari Daily The Sunday Times
2017	(Sinhala) Not Awarded (Tamil) Jeeva Sathasivam (English) Not Awarded	- Virakesari Daily -
2018	(Sinhala) Shirley Anil de Silva (Tamil) Sivalingam Sivakumaran (English) Dilshani Palugaswewa	Mawbima Virakesari Weekly Ceylon Today -

=== Sepala Gunasena Award for Courageous Journalism in the Defence of Press Freedom in Sri Lanka ===
Year	Winner	Newspaper
1998	Uthayan, Jaffna	
1999	Victor Ivan	Ravaya
2001	The Sunday Leader	
2002	Not Awarded	
2003	Not Awarded	
2004	Not Awarded	
2005	Not Awarded	
2006	Sunanda Deshapriya	
2007	Poddala Jayantha and Sanath Balasooriya	
2008	The Chief Editor and staff	Uthayan
2009	Lasantha Wickrematunge (Posthumous)	
2010	Chandana Sirimalwatta	Lanka
2011	Citizens Movement for Good Governance	
2012	Seetha Ranjanee	
2013	Sam Wijesinha	
2014	Free Media Movement	
2015	Not Awarded	
2016	Prabath Sahabandu	The Island
2017	Sri Lanka Working Journalists Association	
2018	M.S.M. Ayub	

=== Prof. K. Kailasapathy Award for Reporting Under Special Circumstances ===
Year	Winner	Newspaper
1999	Ajith Seneviratne	Ravaya
2000	Mylvaganam Nimalarajan	Ravaya, Virakesari, BBC
2001	Not Awarded	-
2002	Ratnayam Thayaparan	Thinakkural
2003	Daya Neththasinghe	Lanka
2004	Not Awarded	-
2005	Vincent Jeyam	Thinakaran
2006	Not Awarded	-
2007	Wilson Gnanadass	The Nation
2008	Not Awarded	-
2009	The Sunday Leader	-
2010	Balentheram Pratheepan	Thinakkural
2011	Tissa Ravindra Perera	Sunday Rivira
2012	Krishan Jeewaka Jayaruk	Lankadeepa
2013	Not Awarded	
2014	Balenthiran Piratheepan	Sunday Thinakkural
2015	Not Awarded	-
2016	Not Awarded	-
2017	Not Awarded	-
2018	Chamara Amarasooriya	Mawbima

=== Sports Journalist of the Year ===
Year	Winner	Newspaper
2000	Asoka Goonetilleke	Divaina
2001	T.M.K. Samat	The Sunday Leader
2002	C. Vijitha Fernando	Daily Mirror
2003	C. Vijitha Fernando	Daily Mirror
2004	Marlon Fernandopulle	The Sunday Times
2005	T. M. K. Samat	The Sunday Leader
2006	Sa’adi Thawfeeq	The Nation
2007	Sa'adi Thawfeeq	The Nation
2008	Channaka de Silva	Daily Mirror
2009	Channaka de Silva	Daily Mirror
2010	Channaka de Silva	Daily Mirror
2011	Channaka de Silva	Daily Mirror
2012	Channaka de Silva	Daily Mirror
2013	Channaka de Silva	Daily Mirror
2014	(Sinhala) Not Awarded (English) Not Awarded (Tamil) Not Awarded	
2015	(Sinhala) Asela Withana (English) Not Awarded (Tamil) Not Awarded	Divaina - -
2016	(Sinhala) Not Awarded (Tamil) Selvathurai Jithendra Presath (English) Not Awarded	- Virakesari Daily -
2017	(Sinhala) Roshan Pathum Sri Wijeratne (English) Champika Fernando (Tamil) Selvathurai Jithendra Presath	Ada The Sunday Times Virakesari Daily
2018	(Sinhala) Roshan Pathum Sri Wijeratne (English) - (Tamil) Selvathurai Jithendra Presath	Ada - Virakesari Daily

=== Scoop of The Year ===
Year	Winner	Newspaper
1998	Sonali Samarasinghe	The Sunday Leader
1999	Yukthiya	-
2000	Sonali Samarasinghe	The Sunday Leader
2003	Ranjith Ananda Jayasinghe Vinitha M. Gamage	Irida Lankadeepa Lankadeepa
2004	Manjula Sanjeevani Fernando	Daily News
2005	Not Awarded	-
2006	Sonali Samarasinghe	The Sunday Leader
2007	Jayantha Sri Nissanka	Lakbimanews
2008	Not Awarded	-
2009	News Desk	The Sunday Times
2010	The Sunday Times	-
2011	Anthony David	The Sunday Times
2012	Channaka de Silva	Daily Mirror
2013	Kasun Pussewela	Ravaya
2014	Not Awarded	-
2015	News Desk	The Sunday Times
2016	Not Awarded	-
2017	The Sunday Times	-
2018	Tharindu Jayawardhana	Lankadeepa

=== Denzil Peiris Award for Young Reporter of the Year ===
Year	Winner	Newspaper
1998	Shan Wijetunge	Divaina
1999	Amantha Perera	The Sunday Leader
2000	Dilrukshi Handunnetti	The Sunday Times
2001	Shelani de Silva	The Sunday Times
2002	Sri Gajan	Virakesari
2003	Warnajith Sumanasekera	Dinamina
2004	Apeksha Dilmini Vidanagamage	Lakbima
2005	Dharisha Bastian	Daily Mirror
2006	A. H. Dileesha Prabhani	Irudina
2007	Rasika Lakmal Jayakodi	Rivira
2008	Isuri Kaviratne	The Sunday Times
2009	Surekha Sanjeevani Samarasena	Ravaya
2010	Lakna Tharindu Paranamanna	Daily Mirror
2011	B Dianne Geraldine Silva	Daily Mirror
2012	Lakna Tharindu Paranamanna	Daily Mirror
2013	Aanya Wipulasena	The Sunday Times
2014	Kamanthi Wickremesinghe	Daily Mirror
2015	Piyumi Fonseka	Daily Mirror
2016	Tharindu Amila Uduwaragedera	Ravaya
2017	Thevarajah Virooshan	Sunday Virakesari
2018	Mandira Pabasarani Wijerathna	Sunday Observer (Sri Lanka)

=== Best Photograph of the Year ===
Year	Winner	Newspaper
1999	Dilshika Jayamaha	The Sunday Times

=== Photographer of the Year ===
Year	Winner	Newspaper
1998	Buddhika Weerasinghe Saranapala Pamunuwa	Lakbima Sunday Island
1999	Gemunu Wellage	The Sunday Times
2000	Sajeewa Chinthaka	Lakbima
2001	Asoka Peiris	Lankadeepa
2002	Daminda Harsha Perera	Daily Mirror
2003	K. Ganeshraj	Thinakkural
2004	Pradeep K. Pathirana	Daily Mirror
2005	Lakruwan Wanniarachchi	Lakbima
2006	Ishara Anuruddha Kodikara	The Nation
2007	Dinuka Liyanawatta	Daily Mirror
2008	Dinuka Liyanawatte	Daily Mirror
2009	Samantha Perera	Daily Mirror
2010	Chathura Kodikara	Rivira
2011	Sanka Vidanagama	Ceylon Today
2012	Gemunu Wellage	Ceylon Today
2013	Rukshan Abeywansha	The Nation
2014	Lalith Perera	The Sunday Leader
2015	Eshan Shammi Fernando	Ada
2016	Saman Abesiriwardana	Divaina/ The Island
2017	Jeyakumar Sujeewakumar	Weekend Express
2018	Tharaka Basnayaka	Ceylon Today

=== Cartoonist of the Year ===
Year	Winner	Newspaper
1998	W. Wijesoma	The Island
1999	Not Awarded	-
2000	Not Awarded	-
2001	Not Awarded	-
2002	Ramachandran	Thinakkural
2003	Dasa Hapuwalanage	Lankadeepa
2004	(Sinhala) Dasa Hapuwalanage (English) Wasantha Kanthilal Siriwardena (Tamil) Suppiah Jeyapalan	Lankadeepa Daily Mirror Virakesari
2005	Jeffrey Ansley Michael Kelaart de Silva	The Island
2006	Suppiah Jeyapalan	Virakesari
2007	R.C. Pradeep Kumara	Thinakkural
2008	Wasantha Siriwardena	The Nation
2009	Suppiah Jeyapalan	Virakesari
2010	Awantha Artigala	Daily Mirror
2011	Gihan de Chickera	Daily Mirror
2012	Awantha Artigala	Daily Mirror
2013	Awantha Artigala	Daily Mirror
2014	Awantha Artigala	Daily Mirror
2015	Namal Amarasinghe	Tamil Mirror
2016	Namal Amarasinghe	Tamil Mirror
2017	(Sinhala) M.D. Weeraratne (Tamil) Sauntis Tarmathus (English) Jeffrey Ansley Michael Kelaart de Silva	Mawbima Virakesari Sunday The Island
2018	(Sinhala) Anjana Indrajith Jayaweera (Tamil) Namal Madushanka Amarasinghe (English) M.D. Weeraratne	Irida Lakbima Tamil Mirror Ceylon Today

=== Best Designed Newspaper of the Year ===
Year	Winner	Newspaper
1999	(Colour) The Sunday Leader (Black and White) Ravaya	
2000	The Sunday Times	
2001	The Sunday Times	
2002	The Sunday Times	
2003	Irida Lankadeepa	
2004	M. L Ajith Ravindra	Irudina
2005	Daily Virakesari	
2006	Thilina Alahakoon	Mawbima
2007	Rivira Media Corporation	The Nation
2008	The Sunday Times	
2009	Irida Lakbima	
2010	The Sunday Times	
2011	Aruna Wickramarachchi	The Sunday Times
2012	The Sunday Times	
2013	The Sunday Times	
2014	Ravaya	
2015	The Sunday Times	
2016	(Sinhala) Ravaya (Tamil) Thinakkural (English) The Sunday Times	
2017	The Design Team	The Sunday Times
2018	The Design Team	Deshaya

=== Best Environmental Report of the Year ===
Year	Winner	Newspaper
2001	Dilrukshi Handunnetti	The Sunday Times
2002	Not Awarded	
2003	Florence Wickramage	Daily News
2004	Nihal .P. Abeysinghe	Silumina
2005	Ifham Nizam	The Island
2006	Hema Sri Amarasinghe	Sathdina
2007	Saliya Kumara Gunasekera	Lakbima
2008	Nimashi Amaleeta	The Nation
2009	Karunaratne Gamage	Irida Divaina
2010	Malaka Rodrigo	The Sunday Times
2011	Rathindra Kuruwita	Lakbimanews
2012	P. M. M. Abdul Cader	Metro News
2013	Nirmala Kannangara	The Sunday Leader
2014	(English) Nadia Fazlulhaq (Tamil) M.H. Fathima Husna (Sinhala) Not Awarded	The Sunday Times Thinakkural -
2015	Jagath Kumara Kanahara Arachchi	Divaina
2016	Aruna Lakshan Fernando	Irida Lakbima
2017	(Sinhala) Dhammika Sapumal Jayasena (Tamil) Mohamed Ali Sabry Ahmed (English) Prasanna Cooray	Mawbima Nawamini The Island
2018	(Sinhala) Prageeth Sampath Karunathilaka (Tamil) Murukaiah Thamilselvan (English) Ranmini Gunasekara	Mawbima Thinakaran Ceylon Today

=== Subramaniam Chettiar Social Development Reporter of the Year ===
Year	Winner	Newspaper
2004	Sita Ranjani	Free Lance Journalist
2005	D Charles Peters	Virakesari
2006	Niranjani Roland	Metro News
2007	R.A. Chandrasiri Ranasinghe	Irida Lankadeepa
2008	K. Ponmalar	Metro News
2009	Mohamed Hussain Fathima Husna	Thinakkural
2010	Susitha R. Fernando	Daily Mirror
2011	Dayaseeli Liyanage Balakrishnan Thirugnanam	Irida Lankadeepa Virakesari
2012	S. Thushyanthan	Thinakkural
2013	Lakna Tharindu Paranamanna	Daily Mirror
2014	K. Sanjeewa	Ravaya
2015	Sudharma Ruwan Kumari Herath	Irida Lankadeepa
2016	Dharma Mohottal	Irida Lakbima
2017	K.V. Samantha Jayalal Sulochana Ramiah Mohan	Irida Lankadeepa Ceylon Today
2018	Indunil Shiromi Usgoda Arachchi	Ravaya

=== Business Journalist of the Year ===
Year	Winner	Newspaper
2004	(Sinhala) Asuntha S Edirisuriya (English) Nisthar Cassim (Tamil) Not Awarded	Lakbima Daily Mirror (Financial Times) -
2005	(Sinhala) Ruwan Thilina Samarasingha (English) Mandana Ismail Abeywickrama (Tamil) G L Ahamed Nifras	Ravaya The Sunday Leader Virakesari
2006	(Sinhala) Ruwan Thilina Samarasinghe (Tamil) A. L. Ahamed Nifras (English) Mandana Ismail Abeywickrema	Ravaya Virakesari The Sunday Leader
2007	(English) Indika Sakalasooriya (Sinhala) Not Awarded (Tamil) Ahamed Nifras	The Nation - Virakesari
2008	(Sinhala) Shyam Nuwan Ganewatte (Tamil) Niranjani Roland (English) Bandula Sirimanna	Sunday Divaina Metro News The Sunday Times
2009	(Sinhala) Shyam Nuwan Ganewatta (Tamil) Yogarajah Nimalraj (English) Cheranka Mendis	Divaina/Irida Divaina Thinakkural Daily FT
2010	(Sinhala) Not Awarded (Tamil) Rajan Sujitha (English) Uditha Jayasinghe	- Virakesari Daily FT
2011	(Sinhala) Not Awarded (Tamil) Not Awarded (English) Not Awarded	- - -
2012	(Sinhala) Ruwan Thilina Samarasinghe (Tamil) Robert Antony (English) Abdul Razak Mohamed Azhar	Ravaya Virakesari The Nation
2013	(Sinhala) D D Chaminda Wickramaratne (English) Not Awarded (Tamil) Sangapillai Vinoth	Lakbima - Daily Virakesari
2014	(Sinhala) Not Awarded (English) Shabiya Ali Ahlam (Tamil) Robert Antony	- Daily FT Daily Virakesari
2015	(Sinhala) Not Awarded (Tamil) S.S.Chandrasekar (English) Chandeepa Wettasinghe	- Tamil Mirror Daily Mirror
2016	(Sinhala) Not Awarded (Tamil) Robert Antony (English) Not Awarded	- Virakesari Daily -
2017	(Sinhala) Dulika Samanmali (Tamil) Suthanthiranathan Anuthinan (English) Not Awarded	Irida Lakbima Tamil Mirror -
2018	(Sinhala) Dulika Samanmali (Tamil) Suthanthiranathan Anuthinan (English) Charindra Chandrasena	Irida Lakbima Tamil Mirror The Sunday Morning

=== Investigative Journalist of the Year ===
Year	Winner	Newspaper
2008	Dr. Prasanna Cooray	The Island
2009	Mandana Ismail Abeywickrema	The Sunday Leader
2010	Lakbimanews	
2011	Sugath Priyantha Kulatungaarachchi	Irida Lakbima
2012	Harsha Mangala Sugathadasa	Irida Lakbima
2013	The Sunday Times News Desk	
2014	Not Awarded	
2015	Namini Wijedasa	The Sunday Times
2016	Mahendra Tharaaka Wickramasekera	Silumina
2017	Barana Mihiran Karunarathne	Irida Lakbima
2018	Prageeth Sampath Karunathilaka	Mawbima

=== Best Designed News Website ===
Year	Winner
2016	(English) www.dailynews.lk (Sinhala) www.dinamina.lk (Tamil) www.virakesari.lk
2017	(English) www.dailymirror.lk (Sinhala) www.deshaya.lk (Tamil) www.thinakaran.lk
2018	(English) www.dailynews.lk (Sinhala) www.dinamina.lk (Tamil) www.metronews.lk

=== Health Care and Medical Reporter of the Year ===
Year	Winner	Newspaper
2017	(Sinhala) Palitha Jayakody (Tamil) Dr. Sivapalan Sivansuthan (English) Udara Punnami Amarasinghe	Rivira Valamburi Daily Mirror
2018	(Sinhala) Sugath Priyantha Kulathunga Arachchi (Tamil) Fatima Husna (English) Udara Punnami Amarasinghe	Deshaya Thinakkural Daily Mirror

=== Best News/Feature Using RTI ===
Year	Winner	Newspaper
2018	(Sinhala) Tharindu Jayawardhana and Bingun Menaka Gamage (Tamil) Karuppaiah Prasanna Kumar (English) The Sunday Times Team	Lankadeepa Thinakkural The Sunday Times (Sri Lanka)

=== TV News Story of the Year ===
Year	Winner	Newspaper
2007	Rasika Lakmal Alwis	Swarnavahini

== Other awards ==
=== Special awards made by the panel of judges ===
==== Special Award of Excellence recommended by the panel ====
Year	Winner	Newspaper
1999	Free Media Movement Dharmasiri Gamage	- Silumina
2000	W. Wijesoma Karunadasa Sooriarachchi	Sunday Island Irida Divaina
2002	K.A. Jagath Kanaheraarchchi Tilak Navaratne Paathukavalan Magazine, Jaffna	Sunday Divaina Subasetha -
2003	Nihal Abeysinghe Gamini Weerakoon S. Thillainathan	Silumina The Island Virakesari
2004	K. W. Janaranjana Sena Vidanagama Ranee Mohamed The Sunday Times	Ravaya Photo Journalist The Sunday Leader

==== Special Awards for the best students of the Sri Lanka College of Journalism ====
Year	Award	Winner
2005	Best Sinhala Language student Best Tamil Language student Best English Language student	Aruni Muthumali Charles Peter Sanjeewa Chandrasekara

=== Merit awards and honourable mention ===
==== Merit Awards for Reporting under special circumstances ====
Year	Winner	Newspaper
1999	Buddhika Weerasinghe Lakruwan Wanniarachchi M.A. Pushpakumara Sajeewa Chinthaka Janapriya Samaradiwakara Asoka Fernando Lakmal Spencer Saman Mendis H.A.N. Fernando Thinakkural Newspaper Uthayan Newspaper	Lakbima Lankadeepa The Sunday Times The Sunday Times Yukthiya The Sunday Leader The Sunday Leader Dinamina Sithijaya - -
2000	Buddhika Weerasinghe	Lakbima

==== Merit Awards in D.B. Dhanapala Award for Journalist of the Year Category ====
Year	Award	Winner
2004	(English) Dilrukshi Handunneti	The Sunday Leader
2000	(Tamil) Aathavan (Tamil) Sarinihar	
2004	(Tamil) (Runner Up) Krishni Kandasamy	Virakesari

==== Merit Awards in Mervyn de Silva Award for Journalist of the Year Category ====
Year	Award	Winner
2006	Puvirajasingham Christopher Kamalendran Sajeewa Wijeweera	The Sunday Times Lankadeepa
2007	Sunethra Athugalpura	Lakbima
2008	D. Charles Peter Christopher Kamalendran Janyitha Seneviratne	Metro News The Sunday Times Sunday Divaina
2010	Gagani Weerakoon	The Nation
2018	Chandani Kirinde Wisu Karunanidhi	The Sunday Times Thinakaran
2019	Easwarana Ratnam	The Sunday Morning Leader

==== Merit Awards in Denzil Peiris Young Journalist of the Year Category ====
Year	Award	Winner
1999	Vasana Wickramasena	Daily Mirror
2000	Nilika de Silva	The Sunday Times
2001	Sri Gajan	Virakesari
2002	Tissa Ravindra Perera Gaya Kumara Weerasinghe	Lakbima Lakbima
2003	Vasana Wickremasena Chandra Prakash	Daily Mirror Thinakkural
2004	1st Runner up: Pradeepa Vijayaratnamm Highly recommended : Dharisha Bastians D. Charles Peters Tissa Ravindra Perera	Thinakkural The Sunday Leader Virakesari Lakbima
2009	Nadia Fazlulhaq B. Dianne Geraldine Silva	The Sunday Times Daily Mirror
2010	Ramesh Warallegama S. N. Mohamed Suhail	Irida Lakbima Vidivelli
2011	S N Mohamed Suhail Sanjaya Nallaperuma	Vidivelli Irida Lakbima
2012	Krishna Moorthy Krishna Prasath Kasun Pussawela	Sooriyakanthi Ravaya
2013	M F M Fazeer Gayan Gallage Shailendree Wickrama Adittiya	Daily Virakesari Rivira The Nation
2016	Sinduri Sappanipillai Thevarajah Virooshan	Daily/Weekend Express Virakesari
2017	Tharindu Amila Uduwaragedara Fatima Amara Ismail	Ravaya Daily Mirror
2018	Yogaraj Dharmaraj Nirmani Bandaranayake	Thinakkural Resa

==== Merit Awards in Photographer of the Year Category ====
Year	Winner	Newspaper
1999	Janapriya Samaradiwakara Daminda Harsha Perera	Lankadeepa, Divaina Daily Mirror
2000	Ajith Seneviratne Saranapala Pamunuwa J. Weerasekera Chathura S. Kodikara Daminda Harsha Perera	Ravaya Divaina The Sunday Times Lankadeepa Daily Mirror
2001	Rukmal Gamage Sajeeva Chintaka Nihal Chandrakumara	Lakbima Irida Lakbima Divaina
2002	Eranga Jayawardena Lakmal Wasantha	The Island/Divaina/ Lakbima
2003	Ashoka Peris	The Sunday Leader
2008	Nishan S. Priyantha	Divaina
2009	Sanka Gayashan Vidanagama	The Sunday Times
2010	Balentheram Pratheepan Gemunu H. Wellage Kushan Pathiraja	Thinakkural The Sunday Times Daily Mirror
2011	Kanchana Kumara Ariyadasa M S Saleem	Lankadeepa Metro News
2013	Ajith Madurapperuma Dushiyanthini Kanagasabapathipillai	Lankadeepa Ceylon Today
2014	Kushan Sangeeth Pathiraja	Daily Mirror
2015	Amila Gamage	The Sunday Times
2017	D.G. Sampath Priyantha Mohamed Saley Saleem	Lakbima Virakesari Sunday

==== Merit Awards in Best Cartoon of the Year Category ====
Year	Winner	Newspaper
1999	Daya Rajapakse Viroshan Wickremeratne	Lankadeepa Gnanartha Pradeepaya

==== Merit awards in Scoop of The Year Category ====
Year	Winner	Newspaper
1998	Ranjith Ananda Jayasinghe	Irida Lankadeepa
2000	Lasantha Ruhunage	Ravaya
1999	Suranimala	The Sunday Leader
2014	Kasun Pussewela	Ravaya

==== Merit Awards in Upali Wijewardene Award for Human Interest Reporting Category ====
Year	Winner	Newspaper
1999	Namini Wijedasa Kumudini Hettiarachchi	Daily Mirror The Sunday Times

==== Merit Awards in Upali Wijewardene Award for Feature Writer of the Year Category ====
Year	Winner	Newspaper
2001	Daminda Jeevan Ranasinghe	Irida Lakbima
2002	Neil Siriweera	Irida Lankadeepa
2003	Kumudini Hettiarchchi	The Sunday Times
2004	(English) (Runner Up) Malinda Seneviratne (Tamil) (Runner Up) R. Raviavrma	The Sunday Island Thinakkural
2007	(English) Poornima Weerasekara	Daily Mirror
2008	(English) Chamitha Kuruppu	LakbimaNews
2009	(Sinhala) Sanjeewika Samaratunga (Tamil) Hassthani Radhakrishnan (English) Randima Attygalle	Irida Lankadeepa Daily Virakesari The Nation
2010	(Sinhala) Sanda Laalith Ranasinghe (Sinhala) Gayan Kumara Weerasinghe Karunarathne (Tamil) Arun Arokianathan (English) Gagani Weerakoon (English) Randima Attygalle	Dinamina Irida Lakbima Virakesari The Nation The Nation
2011	(Sinhala) Biyanka Nanayakkara (Tamil) K Ponmalar (Tamil) S. L. Nirosha Darshan (English) Ranee Mohamed (English) Juliet Coombe	Irida Rivira Metro News Virakesari The Sunday Leader Lakbimanews
2013	(Sinhala) Priyantha Hettige (Tamil) M Hussain Fathima Husna	Irudina Daily Thinakkural
2014	(Sinhala) Sugath Priyantha Kulathunga Arachchi (Sinhala) Inoka Samarawickrama (English) Sarini Shihara Maduwage (Tamil) Poraniyapillai Pushparaju	Deshaya Silumina Daily Mirror Metro News
2015	(Sinhala) Nimal Abesinghe (Tamil) Rajagopal Yasiharan (English) Adilah Ismail	Ravaya Virakesari The Sunday Times
2017	(Sinhala) Sugath Priyantha Kulatunga Arachchi (Tamil) Shanmuganathan Prathiban	Deshaya Sudar Oli

==== Merit Awards in Prof. K. Kailasapathy Award for Reporting Under Special Circumstances ====
Year	Winner	Newspaper
2000	Thinakathir newspaper, Batticaloa	
2004	Highly recommended: Paalippode Venugopal	Eelanatham
2009	M. Mihiri Mangala Fonseka Arun Arokianathan	Irida Lakbima Daily Virakesari
2010	Rivira Team	
2011	Balenthiram Piratheepan	Thinakkural
2012	Dilrukshi Handunnetti Dushiyanthini Kanagasabapathipillai Nirmala Kannangara Jeyam Christirasa	Ceylon Today Ceylon Today The Sunday Leader Thinakkural
2017	(Sinhala) A.A. Chamara Madushanka (Tamil) N.C. Najimudeen	Mawbima Virakesari Daily
2017	(Sinhala) Kasun Pussewela (English) Daily FT Team	Resa Daily FT

==== Merit Awards in Best Foreign Report of the Year Category ====
Year	Winner	Newspaper
2000	Thalif Deen	The Sunday Times

==== Merit Awards in Sports Journalist of the Year Category ====
Year	Winner	Newspaper
2000	Namal Pathirage	Daily Mirror
2001	C. Vijitha Fernando	Daily Mirror
2003	Marlon Fernandopulle Shamseer Jaleel	The Sunday Times The Sunday Times
2004	(1st Runner up) T. M. K Samat (2nd Runner up) Sivalingam Sivakumaran	The Sunday Leader Virakesari
2006	Namal Pathirage	Lankadeepa
2009	Mohamed Naushad Amit Ehamparan Ravivarmah	The Nation Metro News
2010	Neville Victor Anthony	Virakesari
2011	Mariadhasan Michael Silvester Chamila Karawita	Virakesari Divaina
2012	Ravichchandren Ramkumar Roshan Ahangama	Thinakkural Rivira
2013	P A Sukeethan	Daily Virakesari
2014	(English) Channaka de Silva (Sinhala) Chamila Karawita	Daily Mirror Divaina
2015	(Tamil) Mariadhasan Michael Silvester (English) Tuan Mohammed Kamoordeen Samat	Virakesari Weekly The Sunday Leader
2016	(Sinhala) Roshan Pethum Sri Wijeratne	Ada
2018	(Sinhala) Prince Gunasekara (English) Harsha Amarasinghe	Dinamina Daily Mirror

==== Merit Awards in Cartoonist of the Year Category ====
Year	Winner	Newspaper
2000	Dasa Hapuwalanage	Lakbima
2001	Wasantha Siriwardene	Daily Mirror
2003	Wasantha Siriwardena	Daily Mirror
2004	Runner-up (Sinhala) J. Viroshan Wickramarathne Runner-up (English) Lalith Chandana Senanayake Runner-up (Tamil) S Yogamoorthy	Gnanartha Pradeepaya The Island Thinakkural
2006	Jiffrey Kelaart de Silva Dasa Hapuwalanage	Upali Newspapers Lankadeepa
2007	Asanga Indunil Weerasekara	Rivira
2009	Wasantha Kanthilal Siriwardena	The Nation
	Jeffry Michael Kelaart de Silva	The Island
2010	Anjana Indrajith Jayaweera Ratnaraja C. Pradeepkumar	Lakbima Thinakkural
2011	S Jeyapalan Anjana Indrajith	Virakesari Lakbima
2014	Gihan de Chickera Namal Amarasinghe	Daily Mirror Tamil Mirror
2015	Jeffrey Ainsley Michael Kelaart P. Shandrasegaram	The Island Virakesari
2018	Dhammika Sajith Bandara Ekanayaka	Daily Mirror

==== Merit Awards in Best Designed Newspaper of the Year Category ====
Year	Winner	Newspaper
2000	Ravaya Divaina Pathukavalam, Jaffna	
2004	(Runner Up) Ajith Parakum Jayasinghe	Hiru
2006	Wasantha Siriwardane	The Nation
2008	Daily Mirror Ravaya	
2009	The Nation Metro News	
2010	(Sinhala) Irida Lakbima (Tamil) Virakesari Daily (English) The Nation	
2011	Rivira Vivivelli	
2014	The Nation	
2015	Deshaya Thinakkural Weekly	
2017	Ravaya	
2017	(Runner Up) Vidivelli	

==== Merit Awards in Best Environmental Report of the Year Category ====
Year	Winner	Newspaper
2001	Nihal P. Abeysinghe	Silumina
2003	Shanika Sriyananda	Sunday Observer
2004	(Runner Up) Nadeera Tharushi Seneviratne	The Island
2007	Ifham Nizam	The Island
2008	(Tamil) Kulanthaivel Jeyandran (English) Ifham Nizam	Thinakkural The Island
2010	K. Ponmalar Rathna B. Ekanayake	Virakesari Divaina
2011	Balasubramaniyam Kirubaharan	Thinakkural
2012	T. G. Supun Lahiru Prakash Nirmala Kannangara	Irida Lakbima The Sunday Leader
2013	Gunasingham Mikunthan Achala Dharmasena T G Supun Lahiru Prakash	Vallampuri Lakbima Irida Janarala
2015	Nayanaka Ranwella Shanmuganathan Jeyabalan	Sunday Rivira Yarl Thinakkural
2018	Aruna Lakshman Fernando Dimuthu Attanayaka	Irida Lakbima Sunday Observer (Sri Lanka)

==== Merit Awards in B.A. Siriwardene Award for the Columnist of the Year Category ====
Year	Winner	Newspaper
2001	Karunadasa Sooriyarachchi (Kasurige Kolama)	Divaina
2003	Thimbiriyagama Bandara	Ravaya
2004	(Runner Up) Harith Gunawardena	Irida Divaina
2009	(Sinhala) Sujeewa Wimalanath Weeraratne (Tamil) A. H. Siddeque Kariyapper (English) Emil Hals Van Der Poorten	Ravaya Virakesari The Sunday Leader
2011	(Sinhala) Sisira Paranathanthri (Sinhala) Niroshan Handalage (Tamil) Vadivel Thevaraj (English) Emil Van Der Poorten	Rivira Divaina Virakesari The Sunday Leader
2012	(English) Dharisha Bastians (Tamil) Ismaill B. Maarieef	Daily FT Thinakkural
2013	(Sinhala) Biyanka Nanayakkara (Tamil) A M Wais (Tamil) N. Neduncheliyan	Rivira Nawamani Virakesari Weekly
2014	(Sinhala) Amarasiri Wickramaratne	Mawbima (Sunday)
2015	(Tamil) Alagan Kanagaraj (English) Rasika Jayakody	Tamil Mirror Daily News
2017	(Tamil) Kanagalingam Gopikrishna	Tamil Mirror
2018	(Sinhala) Chamathka Kaveen Bandara	Resa

==== Merit Award in Business Journalist of the Year Category ====
Year	Winner	Newspaper
2004	(Sinhala)(Runner up) Janiytha Seneviratne (English)(Runner Up) Mandana Ismail Abeywickrema	Divaina The Sunday Leader
2009	(English) Mandana Ismail Abeywickrema	The Sunday Leader
2011	(English) Sulochana Ramiah Mohan (Tamil) Robert Antony	Lakbimanews Virakesari
2012	(Sinhala) Yasewardana Rodrigo	Irida Lakbima
2013	(Sinhala) Gamini Sarath Godakanda (English) Shabiya Ali Ahlam	Lankadeepa Daily FT
2014	(Sinhala) Gamini Sarath Godakanda	Rivira
2015	(Sinhala) H.A.W.M. Janiytha Seneviratne	Irida Divaina
2016	(English) Chandeepa Wettasinghe	Daily Mirror
2018	(Sinhala) Mahendra Tharaka Wickramasekara	Silumina

==== Merit Awards in Subramaniam Chettiar Social Development Reporter of the Year Category ====
Year	Winner	Newspaper
2006	Shyamalee Murugesu	The Island
2007	M.A. Fahim	Virakesari
2008	Asuntha Sivumini Edirisooriya	Irida Lankadeepa
2009	Ratna B. Ekanayake Chathuri Prarthanie Dissanayake	Divaina The Sunday Times
2010	Randima Attygalle P. M. M. A. Cader	The Nation Thinakkural
2011	Ananda Kumar Kannangara Lakna Paranamanna	Sunday Observer Daily Mirror
2012	S. Thushyanthan	Thinakkural
2013	Daya Neththasinghe S. Thujiyanthan Chaturi Dissanayake Mangalanath Liyanaarachchi	Lanka Sunday Thinakkural The Sunday Times Lakbima
2014	Joseph George Stephen Chamara Amarasooriya Camelia Nilruksha Nathaniel	Daily Virakesari Rivira The Sunday Leader
2015	Alagan Kanagaraj	Tamil Mirror
	Camelia Nilrukshi Nathaniel	The Sunday Leader
2016	Devika Renganathan	Virakesari
	Kasun Warakapitiya	The Sunday Times
2017	K. Prasanna Kumar	Thinakkural

==== Merit Awards in D. R. Wijewardene Award for Earning the Appreciation of Peers and Public Category ====
Year	Winner	Newspaper
2003	A.K.M. Pillai Lasantha Ruhunage	Thinakaran Ravaya
2009	Shamindra Ferdinando Sirimevan Kasthuriarachchi Mihiri Fonseka Ramesh Warallegama Prasanna Jayasuriya Duminda Sanjeeva Balasuriya Sunil Jayasiri Ranil Wijepala Tissa Ravindra Perera Prasanna Fonseka Ranga Jayasuriya	The Island Divaina Irida Lakbima Daily Lakbima Lankadeepa Irida Lankadeepa Daily Mirror Daily News Rivira Siyatha Labimanews

==== Merit Awards for Best Radio News Story ====
Year	Winner	Newspaper
2007	Fathima Nazriya	Pirai FM

==== Merit Awards in Investigative Journalist of the Year Category ====
Year	Winner	Newspaper
2008	Raknish Savan Wijewardene	The Sunday Leader
2011	Indika Sri Aravinda	The Sunday Leader
2013	Prasad Abeywickrama	Rivira Irida Sangrahaya
2014	Nirmala Kannangara	The Sunday Leader
2018	Murugesupillai Selvarajah	Sooriyakanthi

==== Merit Awards in Sepala Gunasena Award for Defending Press Freedom in Sri Lanka Category ====
Year	Winner
2009	Upali Tennakoon J. S. Tissainayagam Poddala Jayantha N. Vithyatharan

==== Merit Awards in Best News/Feature Using RTI ====
Year	Winner	
2018	Rahul Samantha Hettiarachchi	Resa

==== Merit Awards in Best Designed News Website Category ====
Year	Winner
2016	(English) www.sundaytimes.lk
	(Sinhala) www.lankadeepa.lk
	(Tamil) www.vidivelli.lk
2017	(English) www.dailynews.lk
	(Sinhala) www.dinamina.lk
	(Tamil) www.thinakkural.lk
2018	(English) -
	(Sinhala) www.ada.lk
	(Tamil) www.videivelli.lk
