= Mass media in Sri Lanka =

Media of Sri Lanka
- Newspapers & Magazines: Associated Newspapers of Ceylon Limited; Leader Publications; Upali Newspapers; Wijeya Newspapers; Rivira Media; Sumathi Newspapers; Uthayan Group
- Radio: ABC Radio Networks; Colombo Communications; Independent Television Network; MBC Networks; TNL Radio Network; Voice of Asia Network
- Television: EAP Holdings; Teleshan Network Limited; Independent Television Network; MTV Channel; Sri Lanka Rupavahini Corporation; Voice of Asia Network

Mass media of Sri Lanka consist of several different types of communications media: television, radio, newspapers, magazines, and Web sites. State and private media operators provide services in the main languages Sinhala, Tamil and English. The government owns two major TV stations, radio networks operated by the Sri Lanka Broadcasting Corporation (SLBC), and newspaper titles in Sinhala, Tamil, and English.

After the growth of Sri Lankan economy, many satellite TV channels were introduced.

However, there are over a dozen privately owned radio stations and more than 30 privately operated television stations. They often engage in political debates.

The use of the internet is a growing force within Sri Lanka, many of the newspapers now have online editions. Because of the limited circulation for the daily and weekly newspapers, they are heavily dependent on advertising. As a result of this it is very rare to see Sri Lankan newspapers engage in investigative journalism or daring exposés of big business.

== Press freedom ==
Press freedom is a major concern in Sri Lanka. Both sides in the war make efforts to silence inconvenient reporters. Around 15 reporters received death threats from one faction or the other in 2004 The assassinated reporter Aiyathurai Nadesan, correspondent in Batticaloa for several Tamil media stated just prior to his assassination in 2005:

We are caught between a rock and a hard place. It is very difficult for us to check reports either with the security forces or the Tamil Tigers. And when a news item on local events is datelined Colombo, it puts us at risk of reprisals on the ground.

In 2005, the Tamil newspaper Thinakkural was threatened by Karuna. Copies of the newspaper were burned in the Eastern provinces. On the other hand, distribution of the Tamil weekly Thinamurasu is blocked by the LTTE because it is close to another armed group, the EPDP.

BBC World Service stopped its broadcast in Sinhalese and Tamil for fear of reprisal against its reporters.

During the Rajapaksa administration, press freedom in Sri Lanka became the "worst in any democratic country", according to the Reporters without borders index, ranking 165th among 173 countries in the index. On 21 November 2008, a twelve-member group of masked men, forcibly entered the printing press of Sunday Leader, Morning Leader and Irudina Sinhala weekly and set fire damaging printing machines and copies of newspapers printed ready for distribution. The state jammed transmission of BBC programs which contained content the government disliked. The main private TV network Sirasa was repeatedly threatened by minister Mervyn Silva, attacked by a petrol bomb on 2.1.2009 and raided by gunmen on 6.1.2009, who set on fire the main control room. This was in response to SLBC criticizing Sirasa's coverage of the capture of Kilinochchi.

According to the head of the company, Chevaan Daniel: "It's either that the citizens of Sri Lanka are able to drive around attacking institutions armed with weapons and grenades, or there is a hand behind it."

Lasantha Wickrematunge, the chief editor of the English Weekly Sunday Leader and Sri Lanka's most influential journalist, was assassinated on the Thursday January 8, 2009 by unknown gunmen. The newspaper and its editor as well as the editor of Morning Leader have been harassed and threatened continuously during the preceding three years. All Leader publications are very critical towards the government and exponents of opposition political views. According to Reporters without Borders, the Rajapaksa administration blocks investigations into the murder of journalists.

Defence minister Gotabhaya Rajapaksa threatened to chase Chris Morris, a BBC journalists, out of the country, if he does not act responsibly.

Local reporters in the country continue to be threatened, as was the case with 54-year-old M.I. Rahmathulla, who was beaten in April 2009 for reporting on political corruption in the Batticaloa region of Sri Lanka's Eastern Province.

== Print media ==
=== Newspapers ===
Important English language newspapers are the Sunday Leader Daily FT, Daily Mirror, the Daily News, Sunday Observer and The Island. Sinhalese newspapers are Dinamina, Lankadeepa, Lakbima, and Divaina. Tamil newspapers are Uthayan, Tamil Mirror Thinakaran, Thinakkural, Sudar Oli, Metro and Virakesari.

=== Magazines and other periodicals ===
Magazines such as LMD (magazine), Hi!! Magazine, Satyn (magazine), Siriththiran, and Athuru Mithuru.

== Broadcasting ==
=== Radio ===
Radio broadcasting in Sri Lanka dates back to 1923. Radio broadcasting, like other forms of media in the country, is generally divided along linguistic lines with state and private media operators providing services in Sinhala, Tamil, and English language.

Radio stations in Sri Lanka are generally divided along linguistic lines, with major networks offering services in Sinhala, Tamil, and English. The landscape includes both state-owned stations, operated by the Sri Lanka Broadcasting Corporation (SLBC), and numerous private networks.

Sinhala Language Radio Stations

These stations cater to the largest audience with a mix of news, music, and talk shows.

Sirasa FM: A popular, long-running Sinhala station. Hiru FM: Leading Sinhala mass-market station. Shaa FM: A station targeting youth, operated by ABC Radio Networks. NETH FM: Known for news and current affairs. FM Derana: A prominent 24-hour channel. Shree FM: Popular station broadcasting since 1999. Siyatha FM: A major private radio channel. SLBC Sinhala National Service (Swadeshiya Sevaya): State-owned. SLBC Sinhala Commercial Service (Velanda Sevaya): State-owned. SLBC City FM: State-owned. Rangiri Sri Lanka Radio: Known for religious/traditional programming. Lakhanda Radio: State-owned, associated with ITN. Seth FM: Private station. Ran FM: Part of the EAP Broadcasting Company. Sitha FM: Private station.

Tamil Language Radio Stations

These stations serve the Tamil-speaking population, with a high concentration of popular stations based in Colombo. Shakthi FM: A leading Tamil station operated by the Maharaja Broadcasting Corporation. Sooriyan FM: A popular, award-winning station. Vasantham FM: Operated by the Independent Television Network (ITN). SLBC Tamil National Service: State-owned. Thendral FM: SLBC-operated Tamil commercial service. Athavan Radio: Private station. Pirai FM: State-owned, focused on Muslim community content. Star Tamil Radio (formerly Vettri FM): Operated by Voice of Asia Network. Varnam FM: Private station. Capital FM: Private station.

English Language Radio Stations

These stations are mostly privately owned, catering to urban, teenage, and mature audiences with Western music and news.

Yes FM: A leading English hits station. Gold FM: A major retro-hits station (60s-90s). Sun FM: Top teen/adult contemporary station. TNL Radio: A popular rock/alternative station. Legends FM: Classic hits station. Red FM: Music and talk radio. Lite FM: Adult contemporary station. Radio Sri Lanka: SLBC-operated English service. Kiss FM: Private station. Real Radio: Private station.

Bilingual/Multilingual Stations

Y FM: Primarily Sinhala, but with strong English-language musical elements. SLBC Regional Services (Jaffna/Kandurata): Often broadcast in both Sinhala and Tamil. Vidula: SLBC station catering to children, often using all three languages. CRI Sri Lanka: Broadcasts in Sinhala, Tamil, English, and Chinese.

=== Television ===
The first Television network of Sri Lanka was launched on 13 April 1979. The ITN channel, owned by the Independent Television Network Limited (ITN) became the first terrestrial television channel of Sri Lanka. On June 5, 1979 ITN was converted to a government owned business and was later brought under the Sri Lanka Rupavahini Act of 1982 along with the newly created Sri Lanka Rupavahini Corporation (SLRC).

Significant changes occurred in 1992 as the government permitted the establishment of private television networks. Subsequently, the Maharaja Television Network (MTV) was launched in collaboration with Singapore Telecommunications Limited (SingTel).

Since then many new television networks have come into existence within Sri Lanka. There are also a number of Satellite networks and pay per view television networks in Sri Lanka such as Dialog TV which boasts over one million subscribers in the country. The national telecommunications provider Sri Lanka Telecom also launched an IPTV service in 2008.

== Film ==
Sri Lankan cinema is a fledgling industry that has struggled to find a footing since its inauguration in 1947. Sri Lankan films are usually made in the Sinhalese language, the language of the majority Sinhala people.

In the first nine years most films were made in South India and followed the conventions of Indian cinema. Studio shooting was the norm, with Indian style sets erected in film studios. Even though it is popularly held that Rekava, made in 1956 by pioneer director Lester James Peries, was the first Sinhala film to be shot completely out of studio, it was really the film "Gambada Sundari", made in 1950 which was the first film shot outside studios. It was also the first Sri Lankan film where, like in "Rekawa", the dialog was recorded on the spot. This was because the film was shot on 16mm, using an Auricon sound-on-film camera which recorded the sound on the 16mm film optically, unlike in the case of where the sound was recorded on a Kinevox 35mm magnetic recorder. The film was later 'blown-up' to 35mm and was screened in Colombo in 1950.

Though "Rekawa" was acclaimed by local and international critics, the film failed to find an audience in the country and was a box office failure. Films continued to follow formulaic storylines borrowed from India up through the early 60s despite such efforts as Sandesaya and Kurulu Bedda.

Artists such as Tissa Abeysekara, Dr. D.B.Nihalsingha, Prasanna Vithanage and Vimukthi Jayasundara have attempted to breathe new life into the industry. Nihalsingha was an accomplished cinematographer as well as an editor: so his films have an input which was special and brought a viewpoint to all his films, most of which focused on the exploited women.

Vithanage's film Purahanda Kaluwara is widely considered one of the best movies made in Sri Lanka as is Jayasundara's Sulanga Enu Pinisa which won the coveted Camera d'Or for best first film at the 2005 Cannes Film Festival.

In recent years, films have begun to tackle gritty subjects such as family relationships, abortion and results of the conflict between the military and Tamil Tiger rebels in the north. Director Asoka Handagama especially has drawn criticism for pursuing such material in his work.

== Internet ==
Numerous websites covering a wide range of topics, in addition to news and current affairs, exist. Major newspapers have a web presence.

== See also ==
- List of Sri Lankan broadcasters
- List of newspapers in Sri Lanka
- List of television networks in Sri Lanka
- List of radio networks in Sri Lanka
- Sri Lanka Broadcasting Corporation
