= List of newspapers in Sri Lanka =

The List of newspapers in Sri Lanka lists every daily and non-daily news publication currently operating in Sri Lanka. The list includes information on whether it is distributed daily or non-daily, and who publishes it. For those newspapers that are also published online, the website is given.

== General newspapers ==
Newspaper	Language	Frequency	Publisher/Parent Company	Established	Circulation	References
Ada	Sinhala	Daily	Wijeya Newspapers	2012	110,000	
Aruna	Sinhala	Daily	Liberty Publishers			
Daily Mirror	English	Daily	Wijeya Newspapers	1999	76,000	
Ceylon Today	English	Daily	Ceylon Newspapers	2011	25,000	
Daily News	English	Daily	Associated Newspapers of Ceylon	1918	88,000	
Dinamina	Sinhala	Daily	Associated Newspapers of Ceylon	1909	75,000	
Divaina	Sinhala	Daily	Upali Newspapers	1981	156,000 (Daily Divaina) 340,000 (Sunday Divaina)	
The Examiner	English	Weekly	The Examiner	2025		
The Island	English	Daily	Upali Newspapers	1981	70,000 (Daily Island) 103,000 (Sunday Island)	
Lakbima	Sinhala	Weekly	Sumathi Newspapers	1994		
Lakbima News	English	Weekly	Sumathi Newspapers	2007		
Lankadeepa	Sinhala	Daily	Wijeya Newspapers	1991	250,000 (Daily Lankadeepa) 560,000 (Sunday Lankadeepa)	
Mawbima	Sinhala	Weekly	Standard Newspapers	2011		
The Morning	English	Daily	Liberty Publishers			
The Nation	English	Weekly	Rivira Media Corporation	2006	132,000	
Ravaya	Sinhala	Weekly	Ravaya Publications	1987		
Resa	Sinhala	Weekly	Associated Newspapers of Ceylon	2018		
Rivira	Sinhala	Weekly	Rivira Media Corporation	2006	265,000	
Sathi Aga Aruna	Sinhala	Weekly	Liberty Publishers			
Silumina	Sinhala	Weekly	Associated Newspapers of Ceylon	1930	265,000	
Sudar Oli	Tamil	Daily	Uthayan Group of Newspapers	2000		
The Sunday Leader	English	Weekly	Leader Publications	1994		
The Sunday Morning	English	Weekly	Liberty Publishers			
Sunday Observer	English	Weekly	Associated Newspapers of Ceylon	1928	175,000	
The Sunday Times	English	Weekly	Wijeya Newspapers	1991	330,000	
Thamilan	Tamil	Daily	Liberty Publishers			
Thinakaran	Tamil	Daily	Associated Newspapers of Ceylon	1932	50,000 (Thinakaran) 70,000 (Thinakaran Varamanjari)	
Thinakkural	Tamil	Daily	Thinakkural Publications	1997		
Uthayan	Tamil	Daily	Uthayan Group of Newspapers	1985		
Virakesari	Tamil	Daily	Express Newspapers	1930	140,000	
Randiwa	Sinhala	Weekly	Randiwa Newspapers	2011		
Puthiya Kural Newspaper	Tamil	Weekly	Global Media House Limited	2018	7,000 (PuthiyaKural Twice a Month) 3,000 (Putiya Kural Wekkly)	
Sathhanda	Sinhala	Weekly	Sathhanda Publishers	2015		
Siyadesa	Sinhala	Weekly	Express Newspapers	2017		

== Special interest newspapers/magazines ==
Newspaper	Language	Frequency	Publisher/Parent Company	Established	Circulation	Notes
Aloka Udapadi	Sinhala	Weekly	Associated Newspapers of Ceylon			Buddhist magazine
Budhusarana	Sinhala	Monthly	Associated Newspapers of Ceylon			Buddhist magazine
C3 Magazine	English	Bimonthly	C3 Magazine	2007		Computers, gadgets and technology
Daily FT	English	Daily	Wijeya Newspapers	2009	20000	Financial news
Echelon	English	Monthly	Capital Media	2012		Business and Business Lifestyle
Gnanartha Pradeepaya	Sinhala	Weekly	Colombo Catholic Press	1869		Catholic newspaper
HE	English	Fortnightly				
Kalaikesari	Tamil	Monthly	Express Newspapers			International Cultural Magazine
LMD	English	Monthly	Media Services	1994	5,000	Business
Mahamegha	Sinhala	Monthly	Mahamegha Media Network	2010		Family Buddhist Magazine
The Messenger	English	Weekly	Colombo Catholic Press	1869		Catholic newspaper
Namaskara	Sinhala	Monthly	Associated Newspapers of Ceylon			Buddhist magazine
Navaliya	Sinhala	Weekly	Upali Newspapers	1982	131,000	Women's weekly
Nesan	Tamil	Monthly	Nesan Media Network	2006		Regional News Magazine
OSL-THE Investment Magazine	English	Monthly	TTV Media Hub	2018		Business investment
Ravaya	Sinhala	Weekly	Ravaya Publications			Alternative political news
Randiwa	Sinhala	Weekly	Upali Newspapers			Peoples weekly
Sarasaviya	Sinhala	Weekly	Associated Newspapers of Ceylon			Arts/Movie magazine
Sothida Kesari	Tamil	Monthly	Express Newspapers	2011		Hindu Religious Magazine
Tharunie	Sinhala	Weekly	Associated Newspapers of Ceylon			Women's weekly
Torque & Throttle Magazine	English	Monthly	T&T Media/Associated Newspapers of Ceylon	2016	45,000	Automotive Lifestyle Magazine
Vaikarai	Tamil	Weekly	Vaikarai Media Unit			Eastern Province News
Vidusara	Sinhala	Weekly	Upali Newspapers		123,000	Popular science magazine
Mihira	Sinhala	Weekly	Associated Newspapers of Ceylon			Educational Publication
Wijeya	Sinhala	Weekly	Wijeya Newspapers			Educational magazine
