= Bandula Padmakumara =

Sri Lankan journalist and television presenter (1950–2022)

- බන්දුල පද්මකුමාර
- Born: Godewatta Arachchige Bandula Padmakumara; 2 June 1950; Matara, Ceylon
- Died: 24 February 2022 (aged 71); Colombo, Sri Lanka
- Education: Richmond College, Galle; Ananda College
- Occupations: Journalist, media director, TV presenter
- Years active: 1960–2021
- Spouse: Samanmalee Gunasinghe
- Children: 2

Godewatta Arachchige Bandula Padmakumara (Sinhala: බන්දුල පද්මකුමාර; 2 June 1950 – 24 February 2022), popularly known as Bandula Padmakumara, was a Sri Lankan journalist and television presenter. He was an iconic figure of Sri Lankan media and journalism most notable for the popular television programs Mul Pituwa and Loka Sithiyama. He was also a former Editor in Chief of Lakbima newspaper and former chairman of Lake House.

== Personal life ==
He was born on 2 June 1950 in the village of Mapalana, Matara, Sri Lanka. He received his primary education from Rahula College, Matara. Padmakumara completed education from Richmond College, Galle and Ananda College, Colombo. His father Sugathapala Godawatte was a very staunch socialist and a school principal. Bandula has a younger brother Kumudu Kusum Kumara who is a retired university lecturer and two older brothers: Prabhath Kumara and Lal Piyasena.

He was married to veteran writer Samanmalee Gunasinghe. The couple has one son: Hiru, who currently lives in the United States and one daughter: Muthu, who is an English author.

He died while receiving treatment for a kidney ailment at a private hospital in Colombo, on 24 February 2022, at the age of 71.

== Film career ==
Before entering journalism, Padmakumara collaborated to make the film Nim Walalla becoming the assistant director of the film along with a group of Anandians: Ranjith Lal, Dilman Jayaratne, Gamini Wijetunga, Mahinda Algama, Ranjith Kumara, Premakeerthi de Alwis, Kularatne Ariyawansa, Keerthi Balasuriya and Ratnasiri Rajapaksa and Sunil Madhava Prematilake. The film gained critical reception and screened at several international film festivals. In the 1960s, he assisted leading filmmakers Lester James Peries and Tissa Abeysekara to produce films.

== Journalism ==
Bandula entered the journalism while writing articles for the 'Eththa' newspaper during his school days. In the 1970s, Padmakumara was involved in the publishing of women's papers such as Sarasi, Rajina, and Kumari, where he was referred to as the "Mal Paththarakaraya" due to being the founder of youth journals in Sri Lanka. Newspapers like Pathipathini, Kumari and Araliya which he started at that time as well as newspapers like Rajina were very successful at that time. He is also credited with introducing tabloid journalism to the youth. He has been working on it since the early 70s by launching film newspaper magazines such as Sameepa Roopa, Geetha. He also contributed to the success of the popular newspaper, Lankadeepa in 1991. He was the founder of the free media movement in Sri Lanka. In the 1990s, he founded the popular newspaper Lakbima. He was the editor of the Kumari newspaper published on May 9, 1979. He was a close friend of late Vijaya Kumaratunga in last five years of his life before assassination.

A collection of editorials written by Bandula for the Sarasi Cinema newspaper was published in 1995 with the title 'Cinema Vandanawaka Satahan'. In early 2001, he worked as the director editorial of Lake House. In 2002, Padmakumara presented his concept of formal re-recording of the national anthem to be undertaken for 2003 Independence celebration as the second Janasetha Project of Silumina. The chorus was led by Pandit Dr. W. D. Amaradeva and Visharada Nanda Malini and with music composed by Rohana Weerasinghe.

In July 2003, he started the popular newspaper program Mul Pituwa under the guidance of Jeewaka Edirisinghe and sponsorship of Thilanga Sumathipala. He used to wake up at 2.00 am and browse through all the newspapers to summarize the news and presented them in detail. The programs aired on every morning at 6.30 on Swarnavahini. During its airing, Mul Pituwa became the highest rated program in the morning hours and laid the foundation for other newspaper programs in Sri Lanka. He presented the program for 12 consecutive years until his removal in 2015. The program is considered as one of the most prestigious and sustainable programs in the history of Sri Lankan television. He successfully aired its 1000th program on 30 March 2006.

On 31 May 2005, he complained to police by stating that the Janatha Vimukthi Peramuna (JVP) MP, Wimal Weerawansa spread hatred among public by portraying a negative image of journalists as he feared for his life due to that. In 2007, an international group sent death threats to several prominent Sri Lankan journalists including Sunanda Deshapriya, Bandula Padmakumara, Lasantha Wickrematunge, and Victor Ivan through a website, labeling the group “traitors”.

In 2007, Padmakumara became the Executive Chairman of Lake House. During his period, he offered a daily three-minute concentrated summary of current news to Dialog and Mobitel subscribers. During his tenure, salary increments were given to all employees as well as earned Rs. 663 million by selling national newspapers and Rs. 2,270 million through advertisements. He also introduced the CTT technology to the Lake House and received Cabinet approval to purchase a new printing machine that could print 60 colour pages simultaneously, worth Rs. 750 million. In 2012, he published the newspaper Sithmina.

In January 2015, Padmakumara was removed from Swarnavahini due to political pressure from the Maithreepala Sirisena government. However, Prime Minister Ranil Wickremesinghe revealed that, there is no interference of the government to sack Padmakumara from Swarnavahini. Earlier, he did not make any comment regarding his removal from the channel. However, on 24 November 2015, he filed a case with the Colombo commercial high court against Swarnavahini, for removing him from the program Mul Pituwa without prior notice. He demanded creative rights of the program as well as Rs 200 million as compensation.

In 2016, he started his own publishing company, "Print Book". He published two magazines – Adaraneeya Ammi and Business Mantra. In 2018, "Print Book" launched new magazine Sebe. The new newspaper was made in black and white according to the previous format of Ravaya newspaper. In 2017, he joined Asian Mirror where he returned to the presentation and analysis of newspaper cartoons with the new segment called Sarawita.

== Literary career ==
He has published several books related to Sri Lankan politics and journalism. On 14 September 2008, the book titled Mul Pituwata Gena Cartoon was launched by Padmakumara. The book features newspaper cartoons published from January to June, 2008 in the national newspapers drawn by 19 leading cartoonists.

- Loku Aiyalage Madya Nidahasa
- Ranil Wickramasinghe Wage Newei Mama Gambanta

== Legacy ==
On 16 March 2013, a Quadrangular Elle Championship was played for the Bandula Padmakumara Challenge Trophy. Matches were held at the Nawaloka Grounds in Welisara. The tournament was organized for the 30th Anniversary Celebrations of the “Kreeda magazine”, a publication of Lake House.

== Awards ==
=== Sumathi Awards ===
Year	Nominee / work	Award	Result
2004	Mul Pituwa	Jury Award	Won

=== Raigam Tele'es ===
Year	Nominee / work	Award	Result
2012	Loka Sithiyama	Merit Award	Won
