= The Sunday Standard =

Sri Lankan English language newspaper

- Type: Weekly newspaper
- Owner: Tiran Alles
- Publisher: Standard Newspapers (Private) Limited
- Founded: July 2006
- Ceased publication: 24 March 2007
- Language: English
- Country: Sri Lanka
- Sister newspapers: Mawbima

The Sunday Standard was an English-language weekly newspaper in Sri Lanka published by Standard Newspapers (Private) Limited, part of Communication and Business Equipment (Private) Limited (CBE). It was founded in 2006 and published from Colombo. Its sister newspaper was Mawbima.

The Sunday Standard and Mawbima were launched in August 2006.The Sunday Standard was a successor to The Weekend Standard which had been launched by businessman Tiran Alles in August 2005 to help the presidential campaign of Mahinda Rajapaksa. The newspaper was politically independent, and exposed corruption, mismanagement and human rights violations by the Rajapaksa government. This led to the newspaper being harassed by the government. On 18 January 2007, the Inland Revenue Department raided a number of companies associated with the Alles family, including Standard Newspapers. On the same day, the editorial director of Standard Newspapers was threatened with death if the newspapers continued to publish articles critical of President Rajapaksa's brothers Basil Rajapaksa and Gotabhaya Rajapaksa. Dushyantha Basnayake, finance director of CBE, was arrested by the Terrorist Investigation Department (TID) on 26 February 2007, allegedly for giving money to the rebel Liberation Tigers of Tamil Eelam. The TID questioned numerous newspaper staff for many days and raided the offices of CBE on 5 March 2007, seizing financial documents and correspondence. On 6 March 2007, CBE's mobile phone services in the north and east of the country were suspended by the Telecommunication Regulatory Commission on the orders of Gotabhaya Rajapaksa. The bank accounts of Standard Newspapers and CBE were frozen on 7 March 2007 on the orders of President Rajapaksa. The last issues of The Sunday Standard and Mawbima were published on 24 March 2007.
