= Mawbima (1950) =

Mawbima (Sinhala: මව්බිම, 'Motherland') is a Sinhala-language newspaper, an organ of the Communist Party of Sri Lanka. Mawbima was published weekly from Colombo between 1950 and 1996.

The first issue of Mawbima was published on September 1, 1950. The decision to launch the newspaper had been taken at the Communist Party congress held in Matara in the same year. As of the 1950s, the newspaper had a circulation of around 18,000. H.G.S. Rathnaweera was the first editor of Mawbima. The Communist Party leader S.A. Wickremasinghe served two years in prison following an editorial in Mawbima that challenged British rule of the country.

Regular publication of Mawbima was discontinued in April 1996.

When a new publication with the same name was launched in 2006 the Communist Party initiated a lawsuit against it, claiming that they held the right to the name 'Mawbima'. Moreover, the Communist Party decided to resume publication of Mawbima in connection with its 18th party congress and the 25th death anniversary of S.A. Wickremasinghe. However, as regular publication of the Communist Party organ had been discontinued and the party had applied for trademark for the name a few months after the owners of the new non-party Mawbima, the legal petition of the Communist Party failed to win the support of the Colombo Commercial High Court and subsequently the Communist Party withdrew it.
