= Premil Ratnayake =

Sri Lankan journalist and writer

- ප්‍රෙමිල් රත්නායක
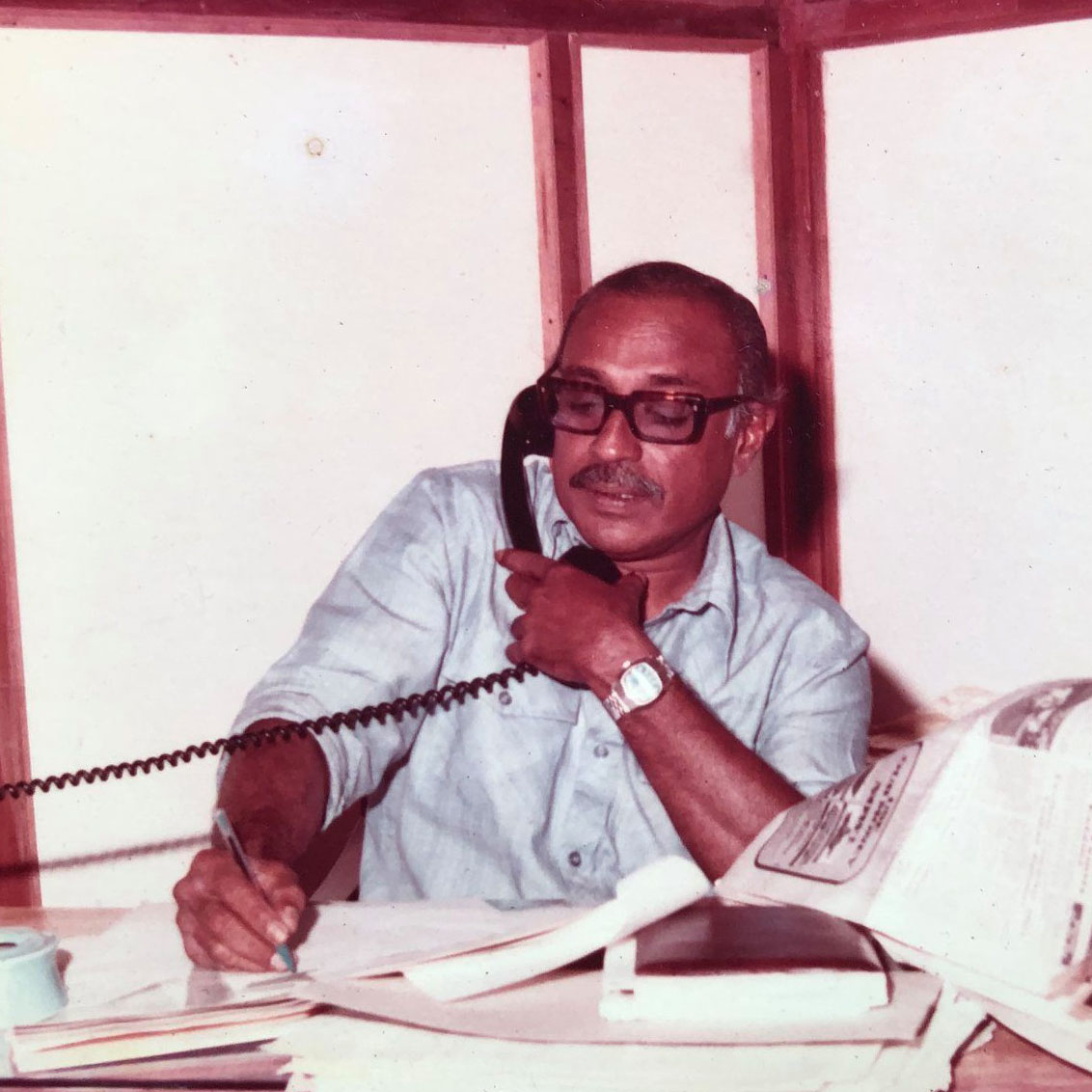
- Born: Premil Ratnayake; 3 April 1933; Hatton, Ceylon
- Died: 10 April 2013 (aged 80); Colombo, Sri Lanka
- Education: Ananda College, Colombo
- Occupations: Journalist –; The Lake House; The Island (Newspaper); The Daily News; First Secretary – Ministry of Foreign Affairs; Press Secretary – Ministry of Trade & Shipping
- Spouse: Jasmine Ratnayake (m. 1964)
- Children: Nayomini Ratnayake Weerasooriya; Sirimali; Manohari
- Website: www.premilratnayake.wordpress.com

Premil Ratnayake, (Sinhala: ප්‍රෙමිල් රත්නායක; 3 April 1933 – 10 April 2013), was a Sri Lankan journalist, author, writer, diplomat, and former First Secretary (Press and Information). Ratnayake was a prominent journalist, having worked at The Lake House, The Daily News, and The Island.

He also worked under Lalith Athulathmudali, as Press Secretary, at the Ministry of Trade and Shipping. In 1984 he was assigned to Bonn, Germany, as First Secretary, for Press and Information, on behalf of the Ministry of Foreign Affairs. Later while in retirement, he returned to The Daily News for a short period.

== Early life ==
Ratnayake Mudianselage Premil Ratnayake was born on 3 April 1933, in Hatton, Ceylon. He was the fourth son of Mudianselage Marshal Ratnayake and Rossyln Paranavitanage. He had four siblings; Willy, Wimala, Edwin (former Commissioner of Labour) and Lal, former DIG. Ratnayake was an exceptionally talented student, athlete, boxer and cadet at Ananda College.

== Personal life ==
Premil married Jasmine Ratnayake in 1964, they had three children; Manohari, Sirimali, and Nayomini Ratnayake Weerasooriya.

== Journalism and writing career ==
Ratnayake started his career working at the Bank of Ceylon. Afterwards, he left to pursue his passion, which was writing. Ratnayake then joined the Lake House, working as a journalist for the Ceylon Daily News. Premil worked alongside the likes of Mervyn de Silva who was the editor of the Lake House, Willie de Alwis D. B. Dhanapala, and Christie Seneviratne. Ratnayake, while being a skilled writer, could also speak Sinhalese, Tamil and Hindi.

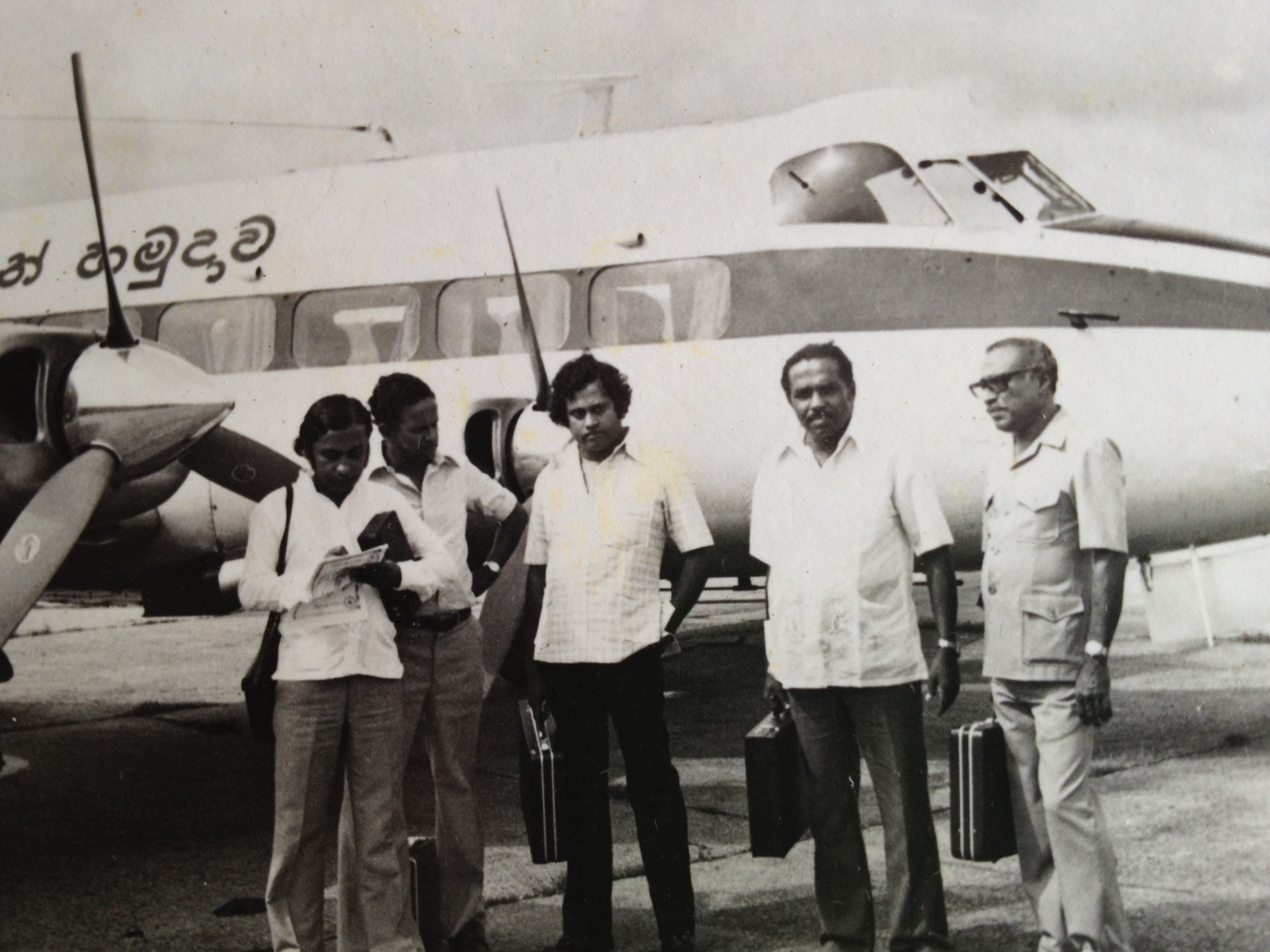
While working at the Lake House

=== Apollo 12 crew tour ===
In March 1970, Premil covered the historic event of the arrival of the Apollo 12 mission crew in Ceylon, for the Ceylon Daily News, part of a 20-nation goodwill tour, to celebrate the successful voyage to and back from the Moon. The Apollo 12 was the second spaceflight to land men on the Moon, it consisted of Charles "Pete" Conrad Jr., Richard F. Gordon Jr., and Alan L. Bean. The crew was welcomed by the then Minister of State, J. R. Jayewardene, US Ambassador Andrew Corry, and the Mayor of Colombo, Vincent Perera.

=== 1977 Parliamentary elections ===
Ratnayake was assigned to cover the 1977 Parliamentary elections, this assignment entailed covering all the election meetings held by J. R. Jayewardene (Leader of the Opposition at the time), on behalf of the Ceylon Daily News. They covered almost all parts of the island.

== Government positions ==
Later in his career, Ratnayake was invited by Lalith Athulathmudali to join the Ministry of Trade and Shipping, as the Press Secretary, in order to handle publicity for the Ministry. In 1984, the Ministry of Foreign Affairs subsequently sent him to Bonn, Germany, as First Secretary, for Press and Information.

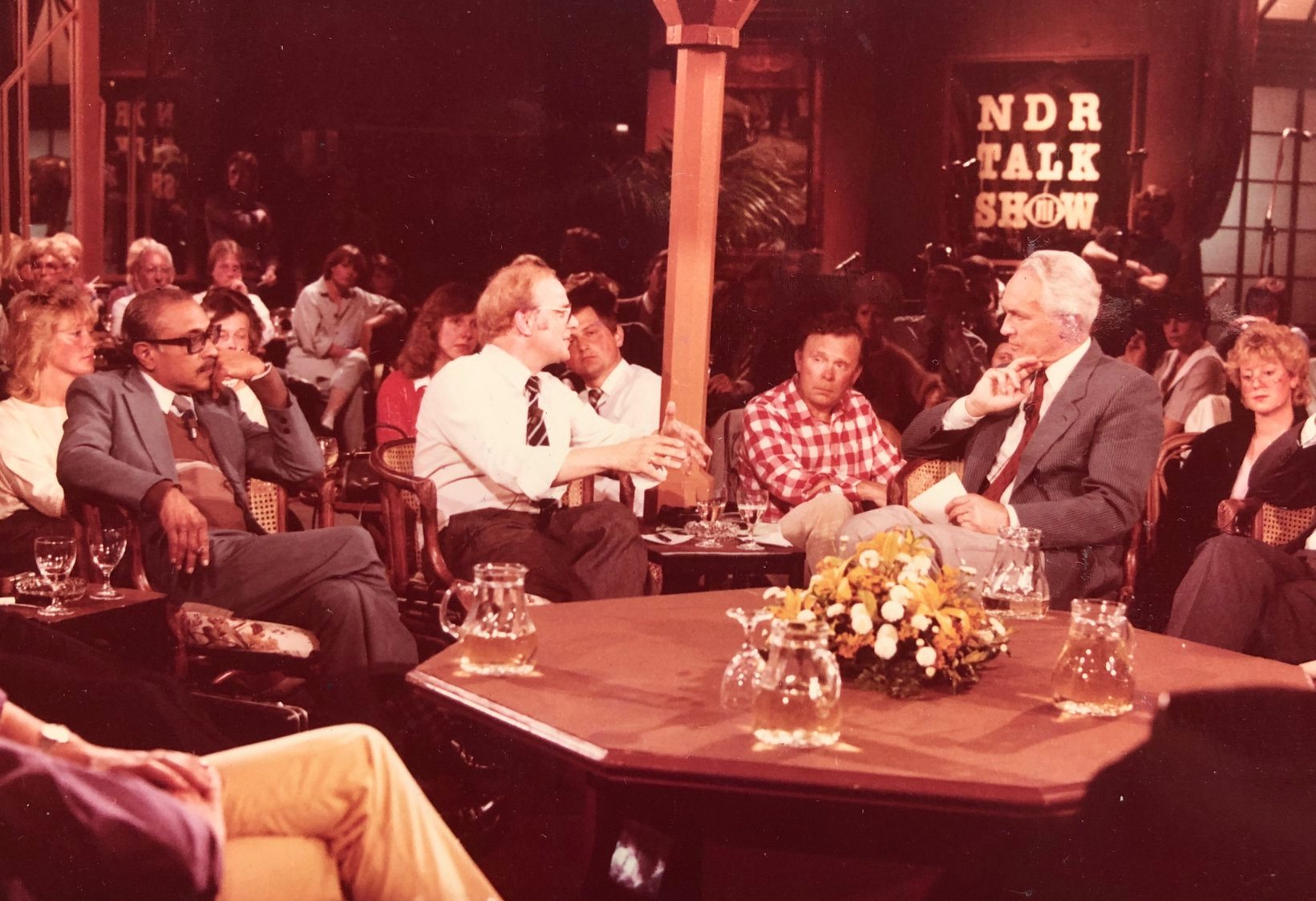
Being Interviewed at the NDR Talkshow Tietjen und Hirschhausen Messestudio Hannover as First Secretary

== Post-retirement ==
After retiring, Ratnayake returned to Lake House, to write for The Daily News briefly. Since he was a writer and journalist belonging to the old world order, he didn't fancy writing on computers, and managed to get himself the only typewriter left at the Lake House as he simply says "To hell with the modernity, the scuttling mouse. All this sophisticated hi-fi gadgetry nauseates me and threatens to kill my journalistic creativity. Give me the typewriter any day – I am like an orphan child re-united with his mother. To be true I detest the computer. Only the typewriter can instil in me the desire to write. Its touch the loving caress, inspires me. Maybe I am naive and old-fashioned but I am me and I am in love with the old mistress."

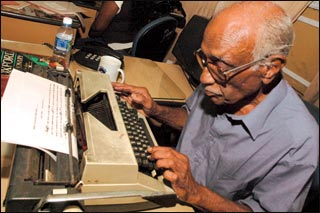
Ratnayake at Lake House (4 December 2009)

== Death ==
Ratnayake died on 10 April 2013, at the age of 80.

== Bibliography ==
Ratnayake wrote several books in his lifetime, four of which were published. One notable example was an autobiography of Lalith Athulathmudali.

=== War and Warriors (1996) ===
Ratnayake's first novel was published in 1996. The story follows Kumar Ranjana, a boy aged 10, and his life ordeals during World War II, following the Easter Sunday Raid, where Japanese forces attacked Ceylon on Easter Sunday.

=== The Third Person Note (1997) ===
His final novel, The Third Person Note was presented on 12 November 1997, at an event held at the National Library Services Board Auditorium, it was attended by Gamini Weerakoon, editor of The Island, and Dr. A. T. Ariyaratne, president of the Sarvodaya Shramadana Movement.

| Year | Book | Publisher |
|---|---|---|
| 1986 | Charisma: Lalith Athulathmudali, a fiftieth year volume | Premil Ratnayake |
| 1996 | War and Warriors | S. Godage & Bros |
| 1997 | Apostle of Peace : Gandhi Peace Prize winner, Sri Lankan Sarvodaya leader Ariyaratne : a narrative | S. Godage & Bros |
| 1997 | The Third Person Note : (a novel) | Sarvodaya Vishva Lekha Publications |
