= Keith Noyahr =

Sri Lankan journalist

Keith Noyahr is a Sri Lankan journalist. He was the associate editor of The Nation. He often wrote critical analyses of Sri Lanka’s security situation in his column "Military Matters". He was abducted by a white van and was severely beaten for hours before being released in May 2008. Later he fled to Australia.

== See also ==
- Human rights in Sri Lanka
- List of kidnappings
- Enforced disappearances in Sri Lanka
