= Hana Ibrahim =

Sri Lankan journalist and editor

- Education: Master's degree in Journalism
- Occupations: Journalist, editor
- Known for: Editor-in-chief of Daily Express and Weekend Express

Hana Ibrahim is a Sri Lankan journalist and editor. She is the editor-in-chief of the Daily Express and Weekend Express and has more than 30 years of experience in local and international journalism.

Ibrahim is the founding editor of Ceylon Today and has previously served as editor of the Sunday Standard, senior associate editor of the Sunday Observer, and editor of friday, a weekly tabloid that she conceived and launched.

== Career ==
Ibrahim has worked in journalism in Sri Lanka and internationally. She worked as a journalist in the United States and subsequently spent several years in the United Arab Emirates with Gulf News, where she covered international events including the wars in Somalia and Bosnia and Herzegovina, the Iraqi invasion of Kuwait and the subsequent Gulf War. She has also interviewed a number of world leaders.

She later held senior editorial positions in Sri Lanka. She was the founding editor of Ceylon Today and subsequently served as editor of the Sunday Standard and senior associate editor of the Sunday Observer. She also created and edited friday, a weekly tabloid.

In June 2012, Ibrahim became editor of Ceylon Today following the dismissal of editor-in-chief Lalith Alahakoon. Her appointment became the subject of controversy involving media organisations and the Free Media Movement, and she subsequently resigned from the movement.

The International Federation of Journalists has documented Ibrahim's work as a senior woman editor in Sri Lanka in discussions concerning gender equality and the representation of women in newsrooms.

== Media freedom ==
Ibrahim has been involved in organisations concerned with media freedom and journalism in Sri Lanka. She served as convener of the Free Media Movement for the 2024–2025 term.

The Government Information Department's Guide to Media 2025 also listed Ibrahim as President/Convener of the Free Media Movement.

In May 2025, Ibrahim was elected to the executive committee of the Free Media Movement for the 2025–2026 term.

The Committee to Protect Journalists has interviewed and quoted Ibrahim on press freedom in Sri Lanka. In 2015, she discussed expectations that a change of government would improve conditions for independent media.

In 2020, Ibrahim, then editor of the Daily Express and Weekend Express, told the Committee to Protect Journalists that newspaper management had cautioned her against being too critical of the Rajapaksa family. She described an environment in which journalists were reluctant to write critically.

== South Asian Women in Media ==
Ibrahim was a founding member of the Sri Lankan chapter of South Asian Women in Media (SAWM-SL), which was launched in Colombo in 2009. The organisation's Sri Lankan chapter was established with Sharmini Boyle as founding president and Ibrahim as secretary.

She has subsequently served as a trustee of SAWM-SL. The organisation describes itself as an independent, non-profit and non-partisan organisation concerned with gender equality, media freedom and the professional advancement of women in journalism.

== Journalism organisations ==
Ibrahim is a director of the Media Law Forum. The organisation describes her as a career journalist with a master's degree in journalism and more than 25 years of local and international experience in the media sector.

She has also been involved with the Sri Lanka College of Journalism. In 2024, she served as deputy chairperson of the college and delivered opening remarks at its graduation ceremony.

Ibrahim was also a director and chairperson of Transparency International Sri Lanka. The organisation's board records describe her as editor-in-chief of the Daily Express and Weekend Express and document her professional background in journalism and media.

== Later career ==
Ibrahim has continued to participate in public discussions concerning journalism, press freedom and media regulation in Sri Lanka.

In 2026, she participated in discussions concerning proposed media legislation and its implications for press freedom and editorial independence. Ceylon Today published an interview with Ibrahim in June 2026 in which she discussed the proposed legislation and its potential effect on the journalism profession.
