= Gamini Weerakoon =

Sri Lankan editor and journalist (died 2023)

- ගාමිණී වීරකෝන්
- Born: March 19, 1941; Ceylon
- Died: 11 November 2023 (aged 82)
- Education: S. Thomas' College, Mount Lavinia
- Occupations: editor, journalist

Gamini Weerakoon (born March 19, 1941) was a Sri Lankan journalist and newspaper editor. He was a founder member of The Editors’ Guild of Sri Lanka. He was regarded as one of the most influential journalists in Sri Lanka.

== Career ==
Weerakoon pursued his primary and secondary education at the St. Thomas College, Mount Lavinia. He initially entered the Science Faculty of the University of Ceylon for his Higher education. He was later transferred to the Law Faculty of the University of Ceylon. However, he did not fully complete his undergraduate studies as he decided to join the Lake House (Associated Newspapers of Ceylon) in the mid-1960s. He began his career in journalism in contrast to the subject faculty he had chosen at the University of Ceylon.

One of the prominent editors of that time, Denzil Peiris, recruited Gamini Weerakoon as the news editor for The Observer. He was invited to take up the position as the news editor of The Island during the inauguration of the Island newspapers, which was launched by prominent business tycoon Upali Wijewardene in 1981. He was promoted as the deputy editor of The Island in 1985.

Weerakoon also worked as a consultant editor for The Sunday Leader for a brief stint. During his stint with The Sunday Leader, he was predominantly engaged in commenting about world affairs on a daily basis, and he also wrote a weekly column about world affairs for the newspaper. He also joined The Sunday Times as a newspaper editor and wrote weekly columns under the title 'Double speak'. He received a Special Award during the 2003 Sri Lanka Journalism Awards for Excellence which was organised by the Editors' Guild of Sri Lanka at the Empire Ballroom of the Mount Lavinia Hotel.

== Death ==
Weerakoon died on 11 November 2023. His remains were kept for public viewing at A.F. Raymonds Funeral Parlour. His body was cremated on 12 November, at the Borella Public Cemetery.
