= Iqbal Athas =

Sri Lankan journalist (1944/1945–2026)

- ඉක්බාල් අතාස්
- Born: 1944 or 1945
- Died: 13 January 2026 (aged 81)
- Occupation: Journalist
- Organization(s): Sunday Times; Jane's Defence Weekly; CNN
- Known for: Reporting on armed forces
- Awards: International Press Freedom Award (1994)

Iqbal Athas (Sinhala: ඉක්බාල් අතාස්; 1944 or 1945 – 13 January 2026) was a Sri Lankan journalist. He was a defence columnist for The Sunday Times, and also contributed to Jane's Defence Weekly, CNN, and The Times of London. He was threatened for his investigative reporting which uncovered scandals in the purchase of the arms by Sri Lankan Defence personnel, particularly the Sri Lanka Air Force. He won several international journalism awards for his work, and in 2000, The New York Times described him as "the country's leading military correspondent."

== Early life ==
Athas was born in 1944 or 1945.

== 1998 attack ==
In 1997 and 1998, Athas wrote a series of articles for The Sunday Times detailing the disappearance of 70,000 mortar shells purchased by the Sri Lankan government from Zimbabwe. The shells first appeared to have been hijacked by the rebel group Tamil Tigers, but experts later concluded the communique allegedly from the Tigers had been faked. For his reporting, Athas was "verbally and physically attacked by both Government officials and thugs".

In 1998, Athas wrote another series of articles on irregularities in aircraft purchases by the Sri Lanka Air Force. That year, a group of armed men entered his home, threatened Athas's wife and seven-year-old daughter, and held an automatic pistol to Athas's head. The government then ordered protective security placed around Athas's home, which would remain until 2007.

In 2002, two Air Force officers were convicted of having participated in the attack, and were each sentenced to nine years' imprisonment. The judge stated, "In a democratic country like Sri Lanka, newspapers have a right to expose the corruption of anyone. If crime is used to suppress it, then stern action should be taken." Athas praised the verdict, but also called for investigations into unsolved attacks on other journalists.

== 2005 Official Secrets Act threat ==
On 26 July 2005, President Chandrika Kumaratunga told a meeting of 1,000 military officials that she was considering charging Athas under the Official Secrets Act after Athas wrote a column describing the purchase of a British logistics landing craft as a waste of money. The law carried a maximum charge of fourteen years' imprisonment. The Committee to Protect Journalists protested the remark, stating, "We're appalled by these threatening remarks against our colleague Iqbal Athas who is being targeted for doing his job as a journalist by promoting debate on matters of public interest."

== Reporting on MiG purchase ==
In two articles in August 2007, Athas reported on the purchase of second-hand MiG-27 jet fighters from Ukraine, suggesting that the deal had been corrupt. The first, on 12 August, was titled "MiGs loaded with millions in mega frauds; The Sunday Times investigation reveals shocking double-deals and wheeler-dealings; While Lanka remains hush-hush, Ukraine Govt. orders full probe". Athas traced the purchase to "Belimissa Holdings", a company ostensibly based in the UK but not listed in the UK Company Register.

After the report, his security was withdrawn by the government, leading Reporters Without Borders (RSF) and the Committee to Protect Journalists to issue statements of concern for his safety. A protest was held outside Athas's house on 27 August by government supporters, which RSF described as a "parody of a demonstration, clearly organised by the authorities and putting Athas in serious danger." The Sri Lanka Working Journalists Association criticised it as "systematic intimidation". W. G. Gunaratne, a journalist who translated Athas's articles into Sinhala for the newspaper Lankadeepa, also reportedly received a death threat from an Air Force officer.

The Parliament of Sri Lanka later launched a probe into the purchase.

== Death ==
Athas died on 13 January 2026, at the age of 81. His funeral was held in Dehiwala on the same day.

== Awards ==
In 1994, Athas was awarded the International Press Freedom Award of the Committee to Protect Journalists, which recognises journalists who show courage in defending press freedom despite facing attacks, threats, or imprisonment. In 2007, he received the Alfred I. duPont–Columbia University Award for his work with a CNN team covering the 2004 Indian Ocean earthquake and tsunami.

== See also ==
- Sampath Lakmal de Silva
