= Rajpal Abeynayake =

Sri Lankan newspaper editor

Rajpal Abeynayake was the Editor in Chief of the Daily News (Sri Lanka), assuming duties in October 2012 until January 2015. He has been working as a journalist since 1984 and is an attorney-at-law.

Abeynayake was a former editor of the Sunday Observer (Sri Lanka) and the founder Editor of Sunday Lakbima News, which he developed into an award-winning national newspaper during a span of five and half years. He has been adjudged Editor's Guild columnist of the year.

He was educated at S. Thomas' College, Mount Lavinia, The University of Missouri and the Sri Lanka Law College where he received the prestigious Hector Jayewardene gold medal for address to the jury.
