= Daily FT =

English-language newspaper in Sri Lanka

- Type: Daily newspaper
- Format: Broadsheet
- Owner: Wijeya Newspapers
- Editor-in-chief: Nisthar Cassim
- Founded: 2010
- Language: English
- Headquarters: Colombo, Sri Lanka
- Price: Rs. 20
- Website: ft.lk

The Daily FT or the Daily Financial Times is a daily English-language newspaper published in Colombo, Sri Lanka, by Wijeya Newspapers.

Its sister newspaper The Daily Mirror (Sri Lanka) and its Sunday counterpart Sunday Times are among the important newspapers in Sri Lanka.

== See also ==
- Lankadeepa, Sinhala-language sister newspaper
- Tamil Mirror, Tamil-language sister newspaper
