= Tamil Mirror =

Tamil-langage news website in Colombo, Sri Lanka

- Type: News website
- Owner: Wijeya Newspapers
- Political alignment: Progressive
- Language: Tamil
- Headquarters: No. 48, Park Street, Colombo 2, Sri Lanka
- Website: tamilmirror.lk

The Tamil Mirror is a Tamil-language news website in Colombo, Sri Lanka. It is published by Wijeya Newspapers. Its sister newspapers are, The Daily Mirror, The Sunday Times, Lankadeepa and Daily FT.

== See also ==
- List of newspapers in Sri Lanka
