= Mervyn de Silva =

Sri Lankan journalist (1929–1999)

- Born: 5 September 1929
- Died: 22 June 1999 (aged 69)
- Education: Royal College, Colombo; University of Ceylon
- Occupation: Journalist
- Spouse: Lakshmi née Fernando
- Children: Dayan Jayatilleka

Mervyn de Silva (5 September 1929 – 22 June 1999) was a Sri Lankan journalist. He was the editor in chief of Lake House and of The Times of Ceylon, editor of the Ceylon Daily News and the Lanka Guardian.

== Early life and family ==
Mervyn de Silva was born on 5 September 1929. He was educated at Royal College, Colombo, and University of Ceylon (Peradeniya), where he was a contemporary of Felix Dias Bandaranaike. He edited the university newspaper between 1949 and 1953.

De Silva married Lakshmi Sylvia née Fernando on 20 August 1955. They had one child, Dayan Jayatilleka, who is a politician and diplomat.

== Career ==
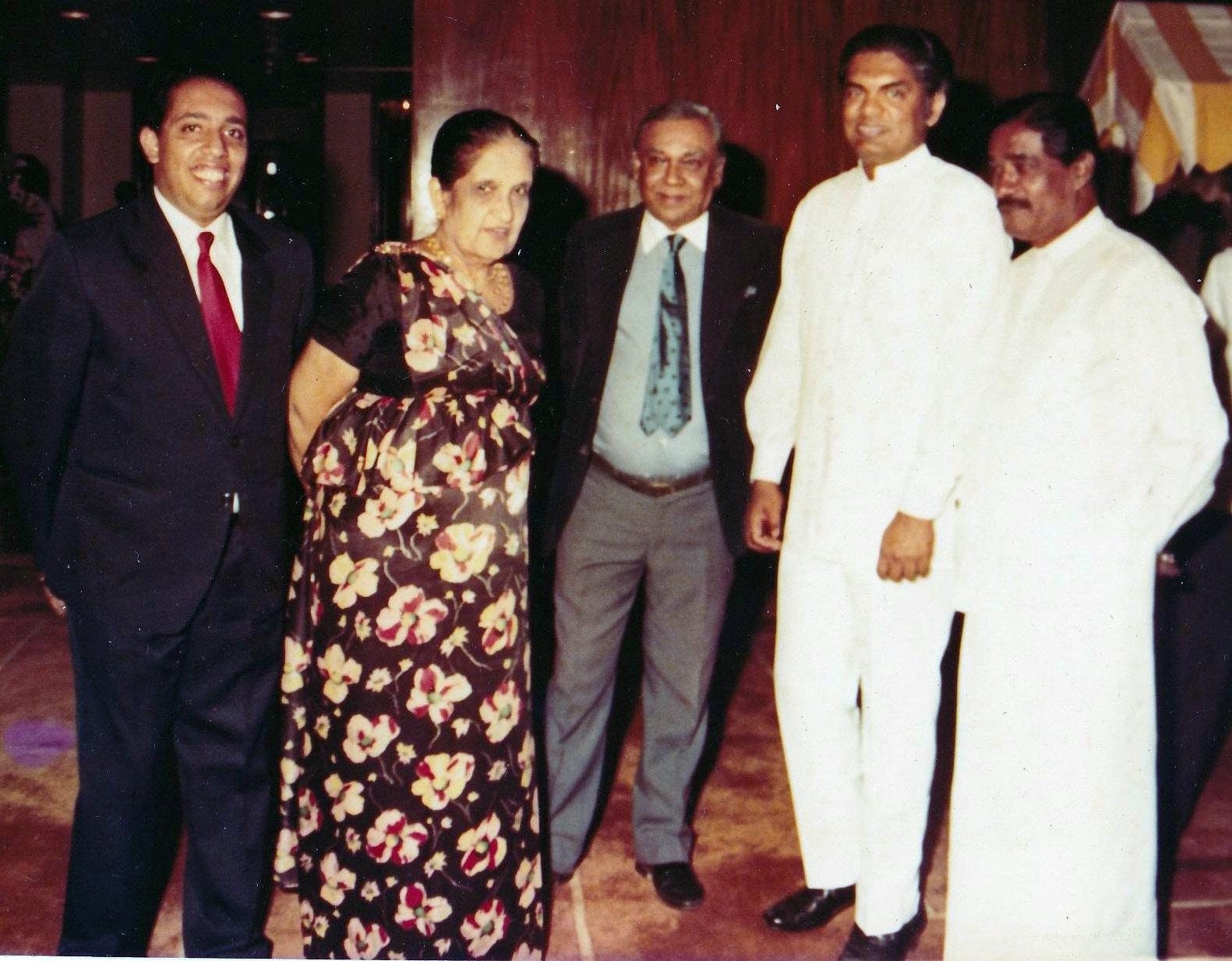
Mervyn de Silva with Lalith Athulathmudali, Hon.Sirimavo Bandaranaike and Anuradha Dullewe Wijeyeratne

Whilst studying law, de Silva joined Associated Newspapers of Ceylon Limited, popularly known as Lake House, in 1954 as a part-time parliamentary reporter. He became a permanent member of staff at Lake House in 1960 and in 1965 he was appointed deputy editor of The Observer. In 1970 he was appointed editor of the Ceylon Daily News, the country's leading English-language daily newspaper. He was appointed editor-in-chief of the Lake House group of newspapers in 1972. Lake House was nationalised in 1973 and in 1976 de Silva was sacked by the government. He became editor-in-chief of the Times of Ceylon group of newspapers in 1976. The Times of Ceylon group was itself nationalised in 1977 and in 1978 de Silva was sacked by the government again. De Silva founded the Lanka Guardian journal in May 1978 which he continued to edit until his death. During his tenure at the Lake House, Mervyn worked alongside the likes of Willie de Alwis, Premil Ratnayake, D. B. Dhanapala and Christie Seneviratne.

During his career de Silva also worked for numerous foreign media including the BBC, Financial Times, The Economist, The Times of India, The Deccan Herald, New York Times, International Herald Tribune, Newsweek, Le Monde Diplomatique, The Guardian, The Christian Science Monitor and Far Eastern Economic Review.

He was involved in the establishment of the Council of World Affairs with Major General Anton Muttukumaru and initiated the Foreign Affairs Advisory Group along with Gamani Corea, Lakshman Kadirgamar, Stanley Jayewardene and Gamini Wijesinghe.

== Death ==
De Silva died on 22 June 1999 aged 69.
