= Ceylon Today =

Sri Lankan English language newspaper

- Type: Daily / Sunday newspaper
- Format: Print, online
- Owner: Tiran Alles
- Publisher: Ceylon Newspapers (Private) Limited
- Editor: Vindya Amaranayake
- Associate editor: Gagani Vidwa Weerakoon
- Founded: 18 November 2011
- Language: English
- Headquarters: 101 Rosmead Place, Colombo 7, Sri Lanka
- Sister newspapers: Mawbima
- Website: www.ceylontoday.lk

Ceylon Today is an English language Sri Lankan daily newspaper published by Ceylon Newspapers (Private) Limited. It was founded in 2011 and is published from Colombo. Its sister newspaper is the Mawbima. Ceylon Newspapers (Private) Limited is owned by politician Tiran Alles. The first edition of the newspaper was published on 18 November 2011.

Editor in chief Lalith Alahakoon was sacked on 13 June 2012. His replacement was Hana Ibrahim. Ibrahim is a past treasurer of the Free Media Movement (FMM) and tried to prevent the FMM from reacting to Allahakkoon's sacking. Ibrahim later resigned from the FMM.
