= Subramaniam Chettiar =

PPR Subramaniam Chettiar
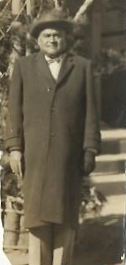
- Chettiar during his world tour in 1955
- Born: 21 September 1901; Avanipatti, Tamil Nadu, India
- Died: 23 January 1975 (aged 73)

PPR Subramaniam Chettiar (1901-1975) was an Indian journalist, entrepreneur, and philanthropist.

== Early life ==
Chettiar was born on 21 September 1901 in Avanipatti, a village in Tamil Nadu's Sivaganga district. He was the third of five children to PR Periannan Chettiar and Visalakshi Aachi. His passion was journalism and he was a writer for several newspapers in India. In his early 20s, he decided to leave the Sivaganga district, where his father was a wealthy local businessman, in order to explore new territories. He traveled to British Ceylon (modern-day Sri Lanka), where he saw the conditions of the Indian labourers for whom he decided to promote justice and equality by establishing a newspaper.

== Founding Virakesari ==
Chettiar established a newspaper in 1930 and named it Virakesari, meaning "victorious lion". The first edition was published on 6 August 1930 in Colombo. He acted as the paper's editor-in-chief and guided the publication for over 20 years. After Ceylon obtained its independence from British dominance, the Parliament of Ceylon enacted the Ceylon Citizenship Act. Rather than taking up Ceylonese citizenship in order to continue running the business, Chettiar chose to return to India and sold his interests in Virakesari in 1965. Today, this newspaper is the most widely circulated and read newspaper by the entire Tamil speaking population in Sri Lanka.

== Business expansion ==
Chettiar purchased assets and established businesses in Malaysia and Singapore in the 1950s. In Singapore, he set up a money lending business under the name of "SVSP Money Lending", which was a part of the Nattukottai Chettiars business houses.

Chettiar invested in real estate in and around Singapore. He purchased estates in Malaysia and established the Veerakesari Rubber Estates in Gelang Patah, Malacca, which was the first Asian plantation in Malacca. While a majority of the estates were owned and run by expatriate planters of British origin, Veerakesari Plantations was the first to be run by an Asian.

== Consolidation ==
After running his overseas businesses for over three decades, Chettiar eventually decided to hive them off and consolidate interests in his native village in India, where he spent the latter part of his life. He planned to bring Virakesari Newspapers to India by setting up an Indian publishing operation based out of Karaikudi in the Sivaganga district. However, this plan was shelved in the final stages of execution. Eventually, he established Kesari Brothers & Co, a limited holding company registered at Alagapuri, Sivaganga district, under which a multitude of companies was set up and run with operations across the southern districts.

With business interests in multiple countries, Chettiar decided to embark on a six-month world tour in 1955, for business and pleasure. With the aid of a personal assistant who accompanied him, Chettiar visited most of the Asian countries including Japan, China, Hong Kong, Korea, Burma, Thailand, Cambodia, Vietnam, Indonesia and a few other Western nations.

== Public life and philanthropy ==
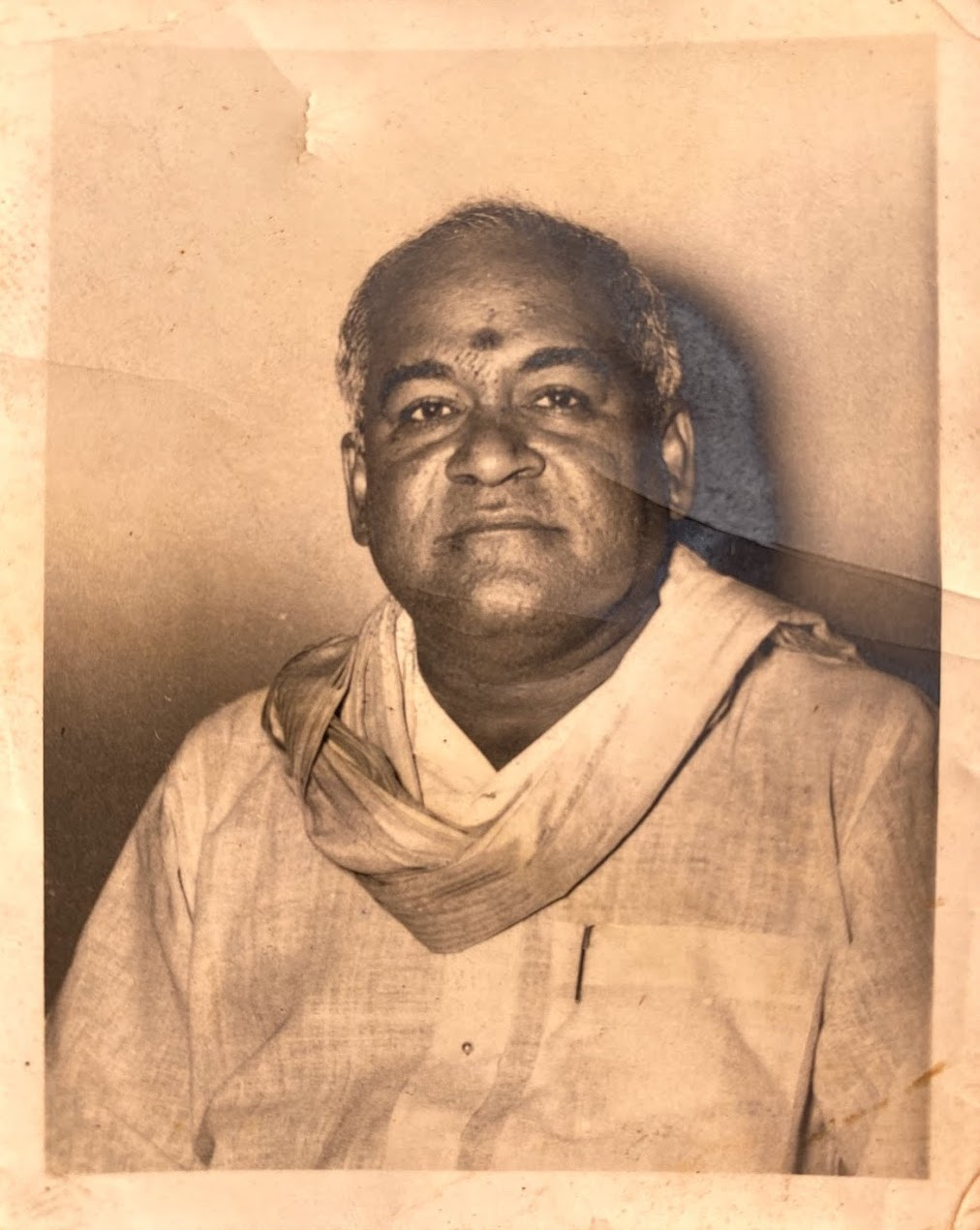
Profile picture of PPR Subramaniam Chettiar

Chettiar headed several public trusts and initiatives. As a philanthropist, he built temples and water tanks and contributed to various charities and public institutions in the Sivaganga district. His contributions include funding and managing the construction of the Sri Sundara Vinayagar Temple in Avanipatti in 1938, construction of the central water tank on Kuruvikondanpatti's main road, and setting up of the Visalakshi Padasalai School to provide free elementary school education to children. He served as the managing trustee of several temples in the Sivaganga region including the Sri Kailasanathar Nithyakalyani Amman Temple at Ilayathangudi, which is the first of the clan of nine temples of Nagarathars.

Subramaniam Chettiar was an influential public figure in the Sivaganga district, hence was often requested to mediate and settle public disputes. He did this on a voluntary basis, often traveling to far-flung places in the region to help resolve familial and civic conflicts in an amicable manner. Thanks to the many neutral and successful outcomes, this service was often sought after and he helped avoid expensive litigations that could have taken years to resolve through the standard legal procedures.

== Family ==
He was married to Kuppal Aachi with whom he had three children. After Kuppal Aachi's death at an early age, he married Ponnammal Aachi with whom he had eight children. He died on 23 January 1975, at the age of 75.
