= Tiran Alles =

Sri Lankan politician (born 1960)

Hon. Tiran Alles
- ටිරාන් අලස් திரான் ஆலஸ்

Minister of Public Security
- In office 20 May 2022 – 23 September 2024
- President: Gotabaya Rajapaksa; Ranil Wickremesinghe
- Prime Minister: Ranil Wickremesinghe; Dinesh Gunawardena
- Preceded by: Prasanna Ranatunga
- Succeeded by: Vijitha Herath

Member of Parliament for National List
- In office 20 August 2020 – 24 September 2024
- In office 22 April 2010 – 26 June 2015

Personal details
- Born: 3 June 1960 (age 66)
- Party: United People's Party
- Other political affiliations: Sri Lanka People's Freedom Alliance; Democratic National Alliance
- Parent: R. I. T. Alles (Father)
- Education: Royal College, Colombo
- Occupation: Politician
- Profession: Businessman

Tiran Alles is a Sri Lankan businessman and politician. He is a former member of Parliament of Sri Lanka and former Minister of Public Security. Alles entered politics as an ally of former General Sarath Fonseka and a member of parliament for Fonseka's Democratic National Alliance in 2010. Leaving parliament in 2015, he returned as a member of former president Mahinda Rajapaksa's Sri Lanka Podujana Peramuna and the leader of the United People's Party in 2020 and became a minister in 2022.

He was the former chairman of Airport and Aviation Services.

== Early life ==
The eldest son of the late leading educationists R. I. T. Alles, he was educated at the Royal College Colombo.

== Business career ==
In 1988, he launched the company Communication & Business Equipment (CBE) with 10 employees. He also acted as the chairman of the Bandaranaike International Airport and launched a major expansion program of the airport. CBE also launched 2 newspapers: Mawbima and The Sunday Standard.

In 2002, he started a mobile telephony business in Sri Lanka after securing exclusive distribution rights, which led to a political controversy a few years later.

== Political career ==
Tiran Alles worked for Mangala Samaraweera when he became the campaign manager for president Mahinda Rajapaksa of the Sri Lanka Freedom Party in the 2005 presidential elections. He was later accused of fomenting a pact with the Liberation Tigers of Tamil Eelam, where the LTTE would enforce a boycott of the elections in the north and east of the country, thus diminishing votes for UNP candidate Ranil Wickremesinghe and allowing for Rajapaksa's victory.

In 2010, he supported the electoral campaign of the Janatha Vimukthi Peramuna (JVP) and took part in General Sarath Fonseka's presidential campaign against Rajapaksa. After Fonseka's loss, he became the chairman of Fonseka's new alliance, the Democratic National Alliance (DNA), for the 2010 parliamentary election, of which the JVP had been a part. Although the alliance won very few seats in the election, he subsequently became a member of parliament for the DNA through a national list seat.

In 2020, he was reappointed to the parliament through the national list of Sri Lanka Podujana Peramuna, led by new prime minister Mahinda Rajapaksa. In May 2022, when Rajapaksa resigned, he was appointed the minister of Public Security in the new government.

Starting in December 2023, Alles had been heavily involved in Operation Yukthiya, an anti-drug effort conducted by Sri Lankan Police where over 38,525 suspects were arrested as of 17 January 2024. He has dismissed criticism from groups such as the United Nations Human Rights Council and reaffirmed his commitment to the operation.

In January 2024, Alles presented the Online Safety Act despite criticism from local and international activists, governments and technology companies. Opposition parties in parliament claimed that the act was presented without Supreme Court recommendation. Many activists claimed the act was presented by Alles to help the government's steadily dwindling popularity. In February, Alles made 47 amendments to the act only after 13 days after its passing.
