= Ravaya =

Sri Lankan Sinhala language newspaper

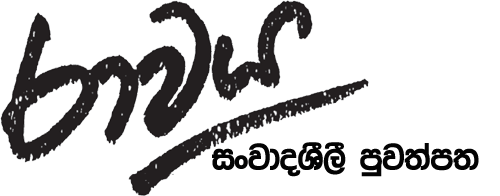
- Type: Weekly newspaper
- Format: Print, online
- Owner: Ravaya Publications
- Editor: Wimalanath Weeraratne
- Founded: 1987
- Language: Sinhala
- Headquarters: 83, Piliyandala Road, Maharagama, Sri Lanka
- Website: ravaya.lk

Ravaya (Sinhala: රාවය) was a Sri Lankan Sinhala newspaper published by Victor Ivan. Established in 1987, it was known for its radical political views. Ravaya was a staunch supporter of Chandrika Kumaratunga in 1994. Ravaya is an intellectuals forum for non traditional analysis of social, political, cultural and judicial views of Sri Lanka. Victor Ivan had taken the path of Mahathma Gandhi and was in the process of applying Gandhism to Sri Lanka.

== See also ==
- List of newspapers in Sri Lanka
