= Thinakkural =

Sri Lankan Tamil language newspaper

- Type: Daily newspaper
- Format: Print, online
- Owner: Asian Media Publications (Pvt) Ltd.
- Founded: 1997
- Language: Tamil
- Headquarters: No. 68, Ellie House road, Colombo, Sri Lanka
- Website: thinakkural.lk

Thinakkural (Tamil: தினக்குரல், romanized: tiṉakkural) is a Tamil newspaper published in Sri Lanka. It was founded by Pon Rajagobal, former editor of Virakesari in 1997. There have reported number of attempts to force the paper to stop its distribution in recent times.

== See also ==
- List of newspapers in Sri Lanka
