= Lakbima News =

Sri Lankan English-language news publication

- Logo of Lakbima News
- Type: Digital publication
- Format: Online
- Owner: Ravidu Mario Weerakoon
- Editor: Ravidu Mario Weerakoon
- Founded: 2007
- Language: English
- Sister newspapers: Lakbima
- Website: lakbimanews.lk

Lakbima News is a Sri Lankan English-language news publication. It was established in 2007 as an English-language sister publication of the Sinhala newspaper Lakbima. The original newspaper was published by Sumathi Newspapers (Pvt) Ltd.

== History ==
Lakbima News began publication in 2007 as the English-language sister newspaper of Lakbima. It was part of the newspaper group operated by Sumathi Newspapers (Pvt) Ltd.

The Sri Lankan Department of Government Information's Guide to Media 2017 lists Lakbima Newspaper (Pvt) Ltd and records lakbimanews.lk as its website.

In June 2008, BBC Sinhala reported on a meeting between Sri Lankan newspaper editors and owners and President Mahinda Rajapaksa. The editor-in-chief of Sunday Lakbima News told the BBC that the president had asked media heads not to criticise government military activities, including arms procurement and promotions within the armed forces.

== Digital operation ==
In 2026, Lakbima News began operating as an independently run digital publication. The digital operation is separate from the earlier newspaper operation while continuing to use the Lakbima News name.

Ravidu Mario Weerakoon is the owner and editor-in-chief of the digital publication.

In September 2026, Daily Excelsior included Lakbima News in an article examining the growth of independent digital newsrooms in Sri Lanka. It described the publication as a digital news platform covering Sri Lankan and international developments.

== See also ==
- Lakbima
- The Sri Lanka Gazette
- List of newspapers in Sri Lanka
