= The Nation (Sri Lanka) =

Defunct Sri Lankan English-language newspaper

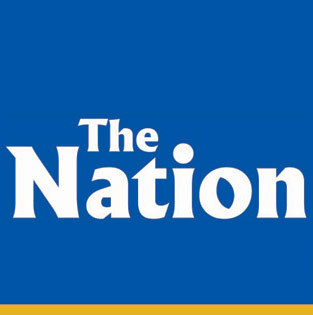
- Type: Weekly newspaper
- Format: Print, online
- Owner: Rivira Media Corporation (Pvt) Ltd
- Founded: 2006
- Ceased publication: December 2017
- Language: English
- Headquarters: 742, Maradana Road, Colombo 10, Sri Lanka
- Circulation: 132,000 (February 2012)
- Sister newspapers: Rivira

The Nation was a Sri Lankan English-language weekly newspaper published by Rivira Media Corporation (Pvt) Ltd. Established in 2006, it was a sister newspaper of Rivira and was published on Sundays. The newspaper ceased publication in December 2017 following weeks of interrupted printing.

At the time of its publication, The Nation had a reported circulation of 132,000 copies per issue and an estimated readership of 662,000 in 2012. The newspaper included supplements covering areas such as politics, sports, business, features and international news. Its editor-in-chief at the time was Malinda Seneviratne. It also had a weekend edition entitled Weekend Nation.

== See also ==
- List of newspapers in Sri Lanka
