= Wijeya Newspapers =

Sri Lankan media company

Wijeya Newspapers Ltd
- Type: Private
- Industry: Mass media
- Founded: 1979; 47 years ago
- Founder: Ranjit Wijewardene
- Headquarters: Colombo, Sri Lanka
- Area served: Sri Lanka
- Key people: Ranjit Wijewardene (Chairman) Sujan Wijewardene (Deputy Chairman)
- Website: wijeyanewspapers.lk

Wijeya Newspapers Limited (WNL) is a Sri Lankan media company which publishes a number of national newspapers and magazines. Formerly known as Wijeya Publications Limited, WNL was founded in 1979 by Ranjith Wijewardene, son of media mogul D. R. Wijewardena. Ranjith Wijewardene had been chairman of Associated Newspapers of Ceylon Limited before it was taken over by the government in July 1973.

Ranjith Wijewardene bought the trade names and library of the Times of Ceylon Limited (TOCL) group after it closed down in January 1985. He subsequently started various newspapers using the names of former TOCL publications: Irida Lankadeepa (1986), Sunday Times (1987), Lankadeepa (1991) and Midweek Mirror (1995). The Midweek Mirror became the Daily Mirror in 1999. Other newspapers, magazines and web sites owned by WNL include Ada, Bilindu, Daily FT, GO: Guys Only, Hi!! Magazine, LW (Lanka Woman), Mirror Sports, Pariganaka, Sirikatha, Tamil Mirror, Tharunaya, Vijey and Wijeya.
