= Victor Ivan =

Sri Lankan writer (1949–2025)

- Born: Majuwana Kankanamage Victor Ivan; 26 June 1949
- Died: 19 January 2025 (aged 75)
- Education: St. Aloysius' College, Galle
- Occupation: Journalism
- Known for: Editor of the newspaper Ravaya

Majuwana Kankanamage Victor Ivan (Sinhala: මාජුවානා කන්කානම්ගේ වික්ටර් අයිවන්; 26 June 1949 – 19 January 2025) was a Sri Lankan journalist. He was a Marxist rebel in his youth and later became the Editor of the controversial Sinhalese newspaper Ravaya. He served as the Editor of Ravaya for 25 years consecutively from its inception.

Ivan was the seventh accused in the main court case arising from the Youth Insurrection in 1971. He was sentenced to five years imprisonment at the end of the inquiry. During his imprisonment he abandoned the doctrine of the JVP as well as that of Marxism and became an ardent follower of Mahatma Gandhi.

== Background ==
Ivan was born on 26 June 1949. He was educated at St. Aloysius' College, Galle and St. Anthony's College, Kandy. Ivan died on 19 January 2025, at the age of 75.

== Insurrection ==
Ivan was a member of the 1971 insurrection of the Janatha Vimukthi Peramuna (JVP) and used the nom-de-guerre Podi Athula (as opposed to "Loku Athula" the former minister Athula Nimalasiri Jayasinghe). He was unable to take part in the insurrection as he was badly wounded months before while making bombs for it and had to undergo surgery at a private hospital in Colombo.

The leaders' prosecution at the 1971 April insurrection trial began on 12 June 1972, at the Queen's Club, located at the Baudddhaloka Mawatha, before the Criminal Justice Commission composed of Chief Justice H. N. G. Fernando (Chairman) Justice A. C. A. Alles, Justice V. T. Thamotheram, Justice H. Dheragoda and Justice T. W. Rajaratnam. Those pleading not guilty were brought in batches before the commission. The main case consisted of 41 suspects which included Ivan. They were considered to be the main architects of the uprising and the youth rebellion. Ivan and several other rebels were found guilty and were punished with imprisonments.

In 1977 he was released with others on an unconditional pardon given by the Jayawardena Government. Later he joined LSSP and unsuccessfully contested the Galle by-election. He later recalled that the insurrection had been a "foolish dream".

While in prison, Victor Ivan wrote two books: the first was entitled "The Challenge of Tenant Farming" (අඳ ගොවිතැනේ අභියෝගය; published in 1979), which explored the feudal character of taxation on cultivations and the tenant farming system in Sri Lanka, and its adverse impact on productivity.

The other was on the History of the JVP and the 1971 Insurrection. In that he claimed that the prevailing discriminatory caste system in Sri Lankan society had been an important contributory factor to the 1971 insurrection. Later, he wrote another book titled "Social background of Youth Rebels of Sri Lanka" in which he argued that the caste system, apart from being a major factor in the youth insurrections in the Sinhala South, had equally become a crucial factor in the youth insurrections triggered by Tamil youths in the North as well.

Ivan in his book "Pansale Viplawaya" published in Sinhala in 2009, which has been translated into English titled "Revolt in the Temple-The Buddhist Revival up to Gangodawila Some Thera –" has made an analysis of this proposition explaining the impact of caste discrimination on Buddhist political trends that emerge intermittently in Sri Lanka. In another book written by him on "Caste, Family & Politics", he analyses on how the caste system has impacted the politics of Sri Lanka since independence to date.

== Journalism & Activism ==
Victor Ivan entered journalism in 1986 and founded the monthly magazine Ravaya, which gained readership for its critical coverage of political and social issues. During the 1987–1989 JVP insurrection, the magazine reported on abuses committed by both the insurgents and government security forces, at a time when media organisations faced threats and restrictions from both sides. Ivan also publicly encouraged citizens to participate in the 1988 presidential election despite the JVP's campaign of intimidation and boycott orders. He warned that the government's military response to continued insurgent violence would result in the destruction of the JVP.

Ivan challenged the application of the Parliamentary Privileges Act after several proceedings were initiated against him under its provisions. He contested the authority of parliamentary committees to adjudicate and impose punishments without procedures established by law. However, there is insufficient evidence to establish that the Act itself was repealed as a consequence of his challenge.

Ivan also faced 11 cases under Sri Lanka's criminal defamation laws. He subsequently filed a fundamental rights application challenging the Attorney General's use of criminal defamation proceedings against him. Although the Supreme Court dismissed his application, he later petitioned the United Nations Human Rights Committee under the International Covenant on Civil and Political Rights. In August 2004, the Committee found that his rights under the Covenant had been violated and recommended that the State provide him with an appropriate remedy (Communication No. 909/2000).

Ravaya published investigations into allegations of misconduct within the judiciary, including a case involving a magistrate accused of raping a woman who had appeared before his court. Ivan also investigated allegations concerning then Attorney General Sarath N. Silva, relating to his personal relationship with the wife of a close associate and the handling of subsequent matrimonial proceedings. The publications raised questions about the conduct of Silva and members of the judiciary. Following complaints and investigations into allegations against judicial officers, the Chief Justice appointed committees to examine the conduct of the magistrate and the district judge involved. Ivan also petitioned the Supreme Court seeking disciplinary action against Silva in connection with the allegations. Silva was subsequently appointed Chief Justice by President Chandrika Kumaratunga, an appointment that attracted criticism, including from UN Special Rapporteur on the independence of judges and lawyers, Dato' Param Cumaraswamy.

== Personal Life ==
Ivan admired Bertrand Russell, so his son is named Athula Russell. Russell was a six-time Sri Lanka chess champion from 2003 to 2010.

== Controversies ==
Ivan and his newspaper, Ravaya, contributed to the political campaign that facilitated Chandrika Kumaratunga's return to active politics and her eventual election as President in 1994. Following her election, Ivan sought a position in the new government, which Kumaratunga declined to offer him. He subsequently became a vocal critic of her administration, writing a book titled "Chaura Rajina" in Sinhala about Kumaratunga and the period of her rule. The English translation of it was published under the title "The Queen of Deceit". More than 50,000 copies of it were sold.

On 3 January 2000, President Chandrika Kumaratunga publicly criticised Ivan during an interview broadcast on state television, making a series of allegations concerning his dealings with her administration. She claimed that, following her election in 1994, Ivan had sought government appointments, including the position of her political consultant, and had subsequently requested Rs. 20 million in financial assistance to purchase the printing press and premises of Ravaya and settle outstanding bank loans. Kumaratunga further alleged that, after she offered him financial assistance, Ivan approached individuals associated with the Maharaja Group and subsequently received financial support from the company, allegedly in return for intensifying his criticism of her government. She also accused him of conducting a sustained campaign against her administration, without giving those concerned an opportunity to respond.

=== Ravaya-gate and Misappropriation of Funds ===
In June 2015, Colombo Telegraph accused Ivan of stealing funds raised through a public appeal to save Ravaya, reporting that he had taken Rs. 5 million out of the Rs. 12.7 million collected. The newspaper alleged that Ivan had used the fundraising campaign to obtain payment for his personal stake in the publication without disclosing this arrangement to contributors. It further accused him of demanding Rs. 20 million for a 40% stake in the newspaper and argued that the payment was impermissible under the legal structure of Ravaya Publishers, which was registered as a company limited by guarantee. The publication also questioned the absence of receipts or share certificates for some contributors.

The controversy drew criticism from former colleagues and contributors to Ravaya. Upali Colombage, a founding director and former deputy editor of the newspaper, publicly challenged Ivan's explanation of the transaction, stating that he had received only Rs. 1,000 for his 100 shares upon retirement. He also disputed Ivan's claim to the publication's assets, arguing that its articles of association required them to be transferred to a non-profit institution in the event of dissolution. Other former employees raised allegations concerning unequal remuneration, salary calculations and irregularities in EPF and ETF contributions. In 2018, veteran journalist and former Ravaya columnist Gamini Viyangoda also publicly criticised Ivan's handling of the fundraising controversy, accusing him of misrepresenting the contributions of those involved in the campaign and intervening to prevent the publication of his response in the newspaper.

The controversy also prompted demands for the return of donations from members of the public who had contributed to the fundraising campaign. Colombo Telegraph reported the case of a 73-year-old widow of a retired school principal, who donated Rs. 10,000 despite living on a monthly pension of Rs. 12,500. She demanded that Ivan return her contribution, stating that she had not received an acknowledgement of her donation and that family members who had collectively contributed approximately Rs. 150,000 had likewise received neither receipts nor shares in the company. In July 2015, lawyer and public-interest activist Nagananda Kodituwakku lodged complaints with the Police Fraud Bureau and the Registrar of Companies over the handling of the funds. In December 2016, Colombo Telegraph reported that the investigation had been obstructed by political pressure, quoting a senior police officer as saying that investigators were unable to proceed. The publication implicated the offices of President Maithripala Sirisena and Prime Minister Ranil Wickremesinghe in the alleged interference. It further reported that Ravaya had begun returning contributions to donors, including Rs. 100,000 returned to Kodituwakku approximately two years after his donation, following police complaints.

=== Allegations of Harassment, Intimidation and Editorial Interference ===
Ivan's management of Ravaya also attracted harsh criticism from former colleagues and journalists. In January 2018, Colombo Telegraph reported that editor-in-chief K.W. Janaranjana had resigned following pressure from Ivan, who continued to exercise influence over the newspaper despite having retired from the editorship. The following month, the publication reported that Ivan had intervened to prevent the newspaper from publishing a right-of-reply letter by columnist Gamini Viyangoda, after the new editor had initially agreed to carry it.

In a July 2015 report, Colombo Telegraph stated that a senior lawyer and legal academic had requested anonymity because she feared receiving abusive emails and a defamatory attack from Ivan. An unnamed former Ravaya employee also asked the publication to withhold his identity, stating that Ivan would attack him if he spoke openly about the matter. These accounts reflected concerns among some of Ivan's critics about possible retaliation for speaking publicly against him.

== Bibliography ==
Ivan was the author of several books including;

- The challenge of tenant farming (Sinhala) 1979 – අඳ ගොවිතැනේ අභියෝගය 1979
- The insurrection of '71 (Sinhala) 1979 – 71 කැරැල්ල 1979
- Sri Lanka in crisis (Sinhala and English) 1989 – අර්බුදයේ ගමන් මග 1988
- The Tamil challenge (Sinhala) 1989 – දෙමළ අභියෝගය 1989
- The social background of the young rebels of Sri Lanka (Sinhala) 1993 – ශ්රී ලංකාවේ නූතන කැරලිකරුවන්ගේ සමාජ පසුබිම 1993
- From the peace pact to the impeachment (Sinhala) 1993 – සාම ගිවිසුමේ සිට දෝෂාභියෝගය දක්වා 1993
- Principles and Techniques of Chess (Sinhala) 1994 – චෙස් මූලධර්ම හා තාක්ෂනය 1994
- Violence, Non-Violence and Revolution (Sinhala) 1999 – ප්රචණ්ඩත්වය, අවිහිංසාව හා විප්ලවය 1999
- Freedom, national integration, and family struggle in politics (Sinhala) 1999 – නිදහස, ජාතික ඒකාග්රතාව හා දේශපාලනයේ පවුල් පොරය 1999
- An unfinished struggle (Sinhala and English) 2003 – නොනිමි අරගලය 2003
- Sri Lanka: A lost paradise (Sinhala and English) 2006 – කදුළු සලන පාරාදීසය 2006
- The revolution in the temple (Sinhala) 2006 – පන්සලේ විප්ලවය 2006
- The queen of deceit (English and Sinhala) 2006 – චෞර රැජින 2006
- Innocence of the Pen Questioned (Sinhala and English) 2010 - පෑන අහිංසකද? 2009
- චෞර රාජ්යය 2010
- ප්රභාකරන් පරාජය කිරීම 2010
- මට පෙනෙන හැටි 2010
- දේශපාලනයේ පවුල හා කුලය 2011
- ලංකාව ගලවා ගැනීම 2011
- දෙමළ අභියෝගය 2012
- අවසානය කුමක්ද? 2012
- ජීවිතයේ ප්රබෝධය, මරණයේ අසිරිය 2013
- අර්බුදයේ අන්දරය, 1815 - යටත් විජිත යුගයේ සිට 2009 - ඊලාම් යුද්ධයේ අවසානය දක්වා
