= Rivira =

Defunct Sri Lankan Sinhala-language newspaper

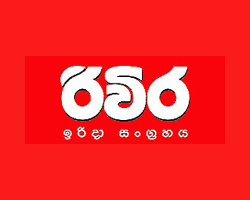
- Logo of Rivira
- Type: Weekly newspaper
- Owner: Rivira Media Corporation (Pvt) Ltd
- Founded: 2006
- Ceased publication: January 2018
- Language: Sinhala
- Headquarters: 742, Maradana Road, Colombo 10, Sri Lanka
- Circulation: 265,000 (February 2012)
- Sister newspapers: The Nation

Rivira was a Sri Lankan Sinhala newspaper published by Rivira Media Corporation (Pvt) Ltd. Founded in 2006, it was a sister newspaper of The Nation. The publication printed both daily and Sunday editions before ceasing publication in January 2018.

At the time of its publication, Rivira had a reported circulation of 265,000 copies per issue and an estimated readership of 1.6 million in 2012. The newspaper covered areas including news, politics, health, sports and international affairs.
