= Daily Mirror (Sri Lanka) =

English-language newspaper in Sri Lanka

- Type: Daily newspaper
- Format: Broadsheet
- Owner(s): Wijeya Newspapers
- Editor-in-chief: Jamila Husain
- Editor: Jamila Husain
- Founded: 1999
- Political alignment: Progressive
- Language: English
- Headquarters: No. 8, Hunupitiya Cross Road, Colombo 2, Sri Lanka
- Website: dailymirror.lk

Daily Mirror is a daily English-language newspaper published in Colombo, Sri Lanka, by Wijeya Newspapers. Its Sunday counterpart is the Sunday Times. Its sister newspaper on financial issues is the Daily FT.

== Daily supplements ==
Mondays through Saturdays

- Mirror Business
- Life

Tuesdays

- W@W – Women at work

Thursdays

- Junior Mirror

== See also ==
- Lankadeepa, Sinhala-language sister newspaper
- Tamil Mirror, Tamil-language sister newspaper
