= Lakbima =

Sri Lankan Sinhala language newspaper

- Type: Weekly newspaper
- Format: Print, online
- Owner(s): Sumathi Newspapers (Pvt) Ltd
- Founded: 1994
- Language: Sinhala
- Headquarters: 445/1, Sirimavo Bandaranaike Mawatha, Colombo 14, Sri Lanka
- Sister newspapers: Lakbima News
- Website: lakbima.lk

Lakbima was a Sri Lankan private Sinhala language newspaper which was owned by the Sumathi News Papers Limited. Chairmen of the organization is Mileena Sumathipala, wife of the late D.W. Sumathipala. The English version of this newspaper was called Lakbima News. "Lakbima Irida Sangrahaya" was a weekend newspaper published on Sunday. It is established in 1994.

The newspaper includes local, foreign, sports and entertainment news. Lakbima News Papers is the main sponsor of the annual Sumathi Teledrama Award Ceremony.

== See also ==
- List of newspapers in Sri Lanka
