= Lankadeepa =

Sri Lankan Sinhala language newspaper

- Type: Daily newspaper
- Format: Broadsheet
- Owner: Wijeya Newspapers
- Founded: 1991
- Political alignment: Centrist
- Language: Sinhala
- Headquarters: 8 Hunupitiya Cross Road, Colombo
- Circulation: 285,000 (Daily Lankadeepa); 580,000 (Sunday Lankadeepa)
- Website: http://www.lankadeepa.lk

Lankadeepa (Sinhala: ලංකාදීප) is a daily Sri Lankan Sinhala language newspaper which is owned by Wijeya Newspapers. They were established in 1991. The chairman of the organisation is Ranjith Wijewardene, the son of D. R. Wijewardena. The newspaper's coverage includes politics, sports, entertainment and military. The weekend newspaper, named Irida Lankadeepa, is published on Sundays.

The newspaper has received the SLIM-Nielsen People's Award for most popular newspaper on multiple occasions. In 2014, Daily Mirror reported that Lankadeepa had won the award for the eighth consecutive time, followed by a ninth consecutive win in 2015 and a tenth in 2016. Its sister newspapers are The Sunday Times, The Daily Mirror and Tamil Mirror. Daily Lankadeepa has an average circulation of 285,000 while its Sunday edition 580,000.

== See also ==
- List of newspapers in Sri Lanka
