= The Sunday Times (Sri Lanka) =

Sri Lankan English language newspaper

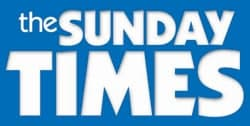
- Type: Weekly newspaper
- Format: Broadsheet
- Owner(s): Wijeya Newspapers
- Founded: 1991; 34 years ago
- Political alignment: Centrist
- Language: English
- Headquarters: No. 48, Park Street, Colombo 2, Sri Lanka
- Circulation: 330,000
- Website: sundaytimes.lk

The Sunday Times is a weekly Sri Lankan broadsheet initially published by the now defunct Times Group, until 1991, when it was taken over by Wijeya Newspapers. The paper features articles of journalists such as defence columnist Iqbal Athas and Ameen Izzadeen. The daily counterpart of the Sri Lankan Sunday Times is the Daily Mirror.

== History ==
The first Times newspaper, Ceylon Times was established in 1846. The Times of Ceylon Ltd, which existed for 131 years, was taken over by the Sri Lankan government in 1977. Ranjith Wijewardena, the son of D. R. Wijewardena, and the chairman of Wijeya Newspapers Ltd, purchased the company which was under liquidation, in 1986. However, the newspaper The Sunday Times came into being in 1991.

== See also ==
- List of newspapers in Sri Lanka
