= Mawbima =

Sri Lankan Sinhala language newspaper

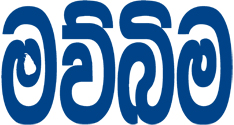
- Type: Weekly newspaper
- Format: Print, online
- Owner: Tiran Alles
- Publisher: Standard Newspapers (Private) Limited
- Founded: 2006
- Language: Sinhala
- Country: Sri Lanka
- Website: mawbima.lk

Mawbima (lit. Motherland) is a weekly Sinhala language newspaper that publishes news, letters, articles, and features related to Sri Lanka.
