= Assassination of Lasantha Wickrematunge =

2009 murder in Colombo, Sri Lanka

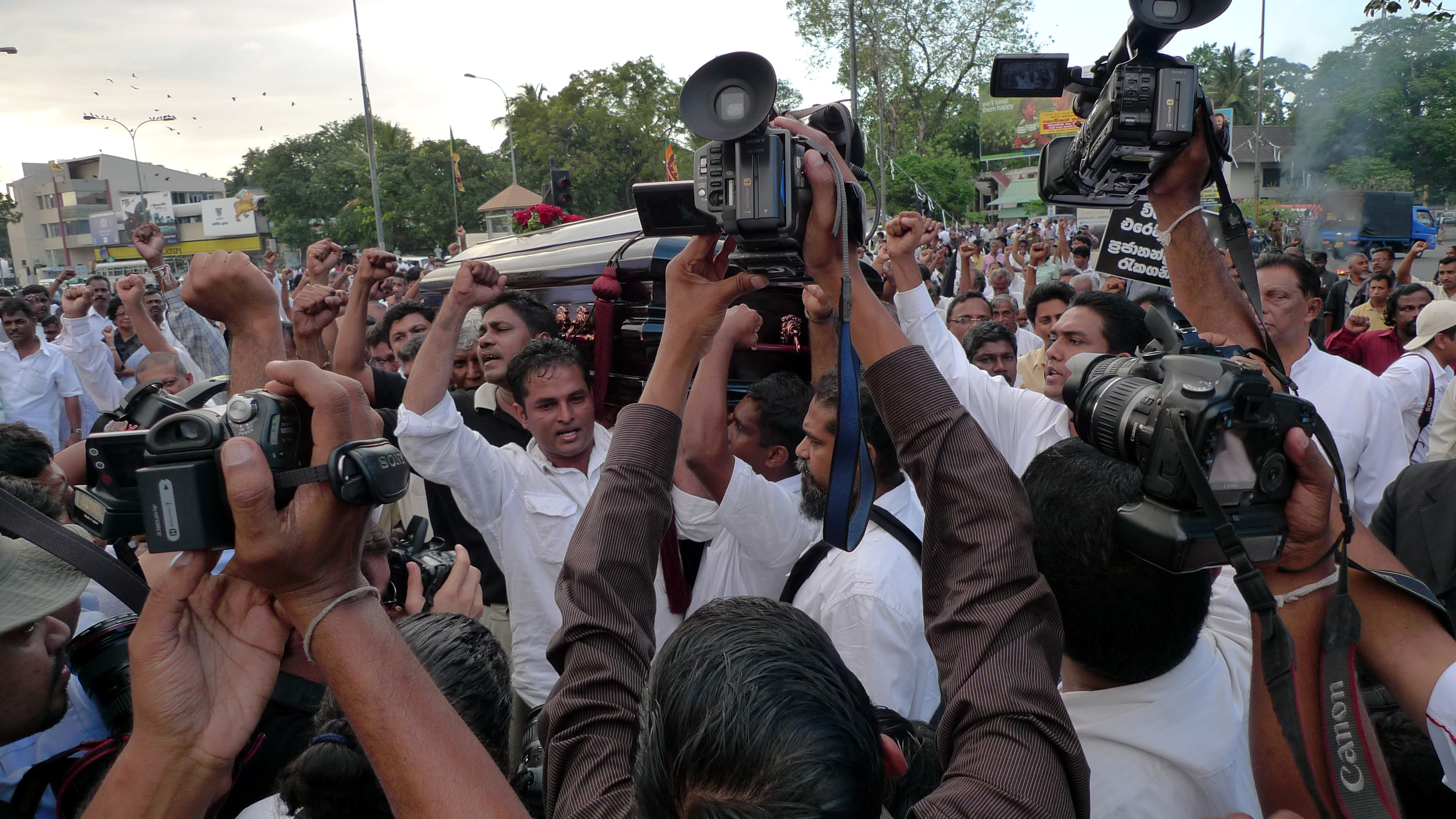
- Location: Ratmalana; Colombo, Sri Lanka
- Date: January 8, 2009; 17 years ago
- Target: Lasantha Wickrematunge
- Attack type: Sniper assassination
- Deaths: Lasantha Wickrematunge

Lasantha Wickrematunge, a Sri Lankan journalist, politician and human rights activist, was fatally shot and assassinated in Colombo, Sri Lanka on January 8, 2009. It is believed that he was killed due to his journalistic work critical of Sri Lankan politicians. His murder was widely condemned across the world. The Government of Sri Lanka also expressed shock at the killing, pledging to do everything in its power to catch his killers.

== Background ==
Due to his work as an investigative journalist, Wickrematunge faced a number of threats and attacks leading up to his assassination. In 1995, masked assailants pulled Wickrematunge and his first wife, Raine, out of their car and attacked them with clubs. Raine later stated that death threats had become part of the routine of their lives: "There were so many threatening calls. 'We are going to kill you. We are going to kill your children.'" In 2002, Wickrematunge's then-wife left Sri Lanka due to the constant threats against their family, taking their three children to Australia.

On September 5, 2000, Lasantha Wickrematunge was found guilty of criminally defaming Sri Lankan President Chandrika Kumaratunga in a 1995 article in The Sunday Leader. Wickrematunge was sentenced to two years in jail, suspended for five years.

Wickrematunge was threatened by President Mahinda Rajapaksa with whom he had a close personal friendship with for over 20 years. Wickrematunge was allegedly abused in a profanity-laden telephone call on January 11, 2006. According to Wickrematunge the President had threatened to "destroy him" over a publication in his newspaper which discussed then First Lady Shiranthi Rajapaksa. Wickrematunge was briefly detained at Bandaranaike International Airport on February 21, 2006, as he arrived for a flight to Geneva. Airport officials had claimed that Wickrematunge required "special permission" to leave Sri Lanka.

In late December 2006, an unsuccessful attempt was made to arrest Wickrematunge for "endangering national security" after he published a report exposing an Rs. 500 million luxury bunker to be built in the presidential complex. Criminal Investigation Department personnel had consulted Sri Lanka's then Attorney General, on the possibility of detaining Wickrematunge under Emergency Regulations. Wickrematunge addressed the media and a large gathering of supporters outside the premises of The Sunday Leader and stated that he will not seek safe passage overseas and will face all political oppression levelled against him and "stand unbowed and unafraid". Due to the public outcry and pressure on the Government by the country's Opposition Party and local and international Human Rights organisations, he was not arrested.

On December 5, 2008, a judge ordered Leader Publications not to publish any reports about Gotabaya Rajapaksa for two weeks.

== Assassination ==
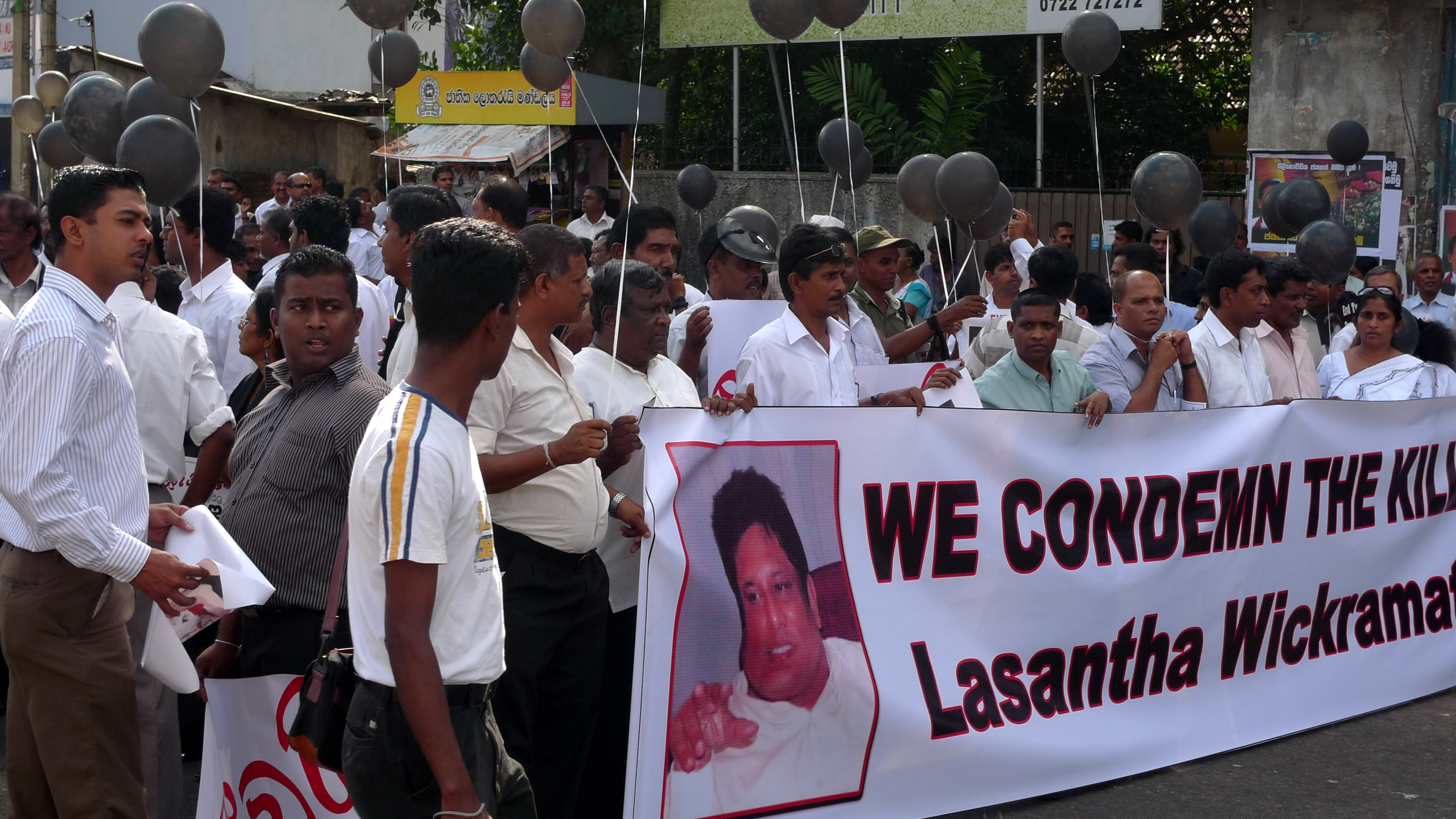
Lasantha Wickrematunge Funeral Protests January 2009.

On the 6th of January 2009, fifteen assailants stormed the studio and transmission complex of MTV MBC and destroyed the main control room and their media equipment. Evidence showed a Claymore mine was used for the attack. Lasantha Wickrematunge who had worked as a broadcaster and hosted Good Morning Sri Lanka at Sirasa arrived at the location and condemned the attack as an act of terrorism in his final public appearance.

Two days later on Thursday, January 8, 2009, Lasantha was at his residence in Nugegoda Colombo. At 8:00 AM, Wickrematunge received a phone call from his wife Sonali Samarasinghe. Samarasinghe had asked Wickremtuange to stop by her home in Battaramulla on his way to work to help her resolve a domestic issue. Samarasinghe had informed Wickrematunge that a domestic aid working for her was unwell and Wickrematunge set off to Battaramulla at 8.20 Am. Wickrematunge had voiced his suspicions of being followed on the days leading up to the 8th of January.

As Wickrematunge left his home in Nugegoda, he began to notice suspicious activity and received a phone call from one of his staff members at The Sunday Leader who informed him that they had been alerted to a threat of danger and warned him that he was being followed. Wickrematunge's driver Dias Karunaratne, who was at his home in Nugegoda had just washed Wickrematunge's car and had forgotten to take his cell phone off the car's wiper blades. Karunaratne had tried to contact Wickrematunge about retrieving his phone but was unable to reach him. Karunaratne then headed off to buy some cigarettes at a nearby boutique and was then warned by one of his friends, a "three wheeler driver", of danger to wickrematunge. The three wheeler driver had reportedly seen two men on motorbikes parked outside the boutique smoking a cigerrete. He told Karunaratne they had been acting "suspicious" and that he had overheard one of the men put out his cigarette and say "he has left now" as Wickrematunge's car drove past them.

Soon after being alerted to the suspicious activity by his friend, Karunaratne drove off to The Sunday Leader office to warn Wickrematunge of the threat brought to his attention. Upon arrival at the premises of Leader Publication, Karunaratne was informed that Wickrematunge had not yet arrived to work.

At this time, Wickrematunge had been in Battaramulla attending to Samarasinghe's domestic issues and both he and Samarasinghe left for a nearby pharmaceutical store to buy some medical items. As they were driving, Samarasinghe and Wickrematunge noticed they were being followed by some men on motorbikes. As they were returning to the Battaramulla home, two of the men on the black motorcycles sped past them. The men on the motorbikes were described as "wearing helmets and black fatigues" and allegedly stared Wickrematunge down as he and Samarasinghe exited the vehicle. Samarasinghe reported that she quickly pulled Wickrematunge into her home and locked the doors. After some time, Samarasinghe said Wickrematunge was determined to go back to work. Since it was a Thursday, Wickrematunge was in a hurry to head off as this was usually a vital production day for him.

As Wickrematunge left Battaramulla, he phoned Karunaratne and asked him to meet him in Nugegoda so he could hand over some documents and return his phone back to him. Wickrematunge then proceeded to drive to the Sunday Leader office.

As Wickrematunge was getting closer to the Leader building, he saw that he was still being followed by the men on the motorcycles and he proceeded to write down the license plates of the bikes whilst driving and started making phone calls. Wickrematunge telephoned President Mahinda Rajapaksa who was in a meeting and had then called some friends who asked him to drive to a police station.

President Rajapaksa had been attending multiple meetings at Temple Trees on the morning of January 8, 2009 and had been in the middle of a meeting with four associations related to Sri Lanka's issues facing exporters. The former president had been in discussions with industrialists on the country's economic scenario. The meeting was attended by the Coconut Product Exporters Association, the Coir Products Association, the Horticultural Exporters Association and the Poultry Association.

As Wickrematunge was driving, Eight helmeted men on four motorcycles forced Wickrematunge's car to the side of a busy street and shot him in a commando-style operation. One of the onlookers, was a delivery man who was delivering a stock of printing goods when he witnessed the assassination and rushed to his aid. The delivery man told investigators that he had just come out of his office on Attidiya Road and described the streets being filled with chaos. According to reports, Wickrematunge was attacked at approximately 10.45 am by four unidentified gunmen riding motorcycles in close proximity to the Ratmalana military base. The Witness reported that he saw motorcycles speeding off and the car of Wickrematunge being surrounded by people. As he walked towards the car and saw that the window on one side of the vehicle was smashed and wickrematunge injured, he asked some onlookers to help rush him to the nearest hospital.

At this time Rajapaksa who was still in his meeting, received a phone call and was reported to have been listening attentively and only interrupted the telephone exchange to respond ‘oluwatada wedune?’ (Did they hit the head?) before terminating the call. One of the exporters making the presentation to the president noticed Rajapaksa's demeanor change and had asked the president if he should continue to proceed at which time, Rajapaksa told him to continue with the presentation.

The delivery man who was rushing Wickrematunge to hospital said that Wickrematunge's mobile phone had started to ring as they were driving and since he was holding onto Wickrematunge, he asked the person next to him to answer the phone and inform the caller that if he knew the owner of the phone, to come to the Kalubowila Hospital immediately. The men rushing Wickrematunge to the hospital stated that it was only when they reached the hospital that they were shocked to realise that the injured person in the vehicle was Lasantha Wickrematunge. The witness said in an interview, "We have always admired him as a fearless man who stood for the rights of the people. We were all sad to find out that it was this man who was shot,"

Upon arrival at the Kalubowila, hundreds of people had started to crowd the hospital upon hearing of Wickrematunge's attack. Wickrematunge died in hospital after nearly three hours of emergency surgery to head wounds at approximately 2.10 pm.

== Response ==
=== National ===
President Mahinda Rajapaksa described the assassination as an attempt to discredit the government, and said he was both grieved and shocked. He also said he had ordered a thorough police inquiry, and called the assassination an "international conspiracy". The Opposition Leader Ranil Wickremesinghe responded, calling the assassination part of an anti-democratic conspiracy, and accused the government of attempting to silence its critics.

The United National Party, Sri Lanka's main opposition party, also staged a demonstration in parliament on January 9 to protest his assassination.

=== International ===
Wickrematunge's assassination caused an international outcry. Reporters Without Borders said that "Sri Lanka has lost one of its more talented, courageous and iconoclastic journalists," and that "President Mahinda Rajapaksa, his associates and the government media are directly to blame because they incited hatred against him and allowed an outrageous level of impunity to develop with regards to violence against the press". The assassination was condemned by Norway, the United States, the United Kingdom, the European Union, India and Japan, and the United Nations strongly condemned the assassination while the World Bank expressed its concerns over the attack.

The British Secretary of State for Foreign and Commonwealth Affairs, David Miliband, said that the British government condemned the killing of Wickrematunge and said that it was the duty of the authorities to take prompt action into these incidents:

We condemn such brazen attacks. Of particular concern was the murder, on 8 January, of the Chief Editor of The Sunday Leader newspaper, Lasantha Wickrematunge. The Sri Lankan authorities have a duty to take prompt action to ensure that a thorough and independent investigation is carried out.

Lindsay Ross, former executive director, Commonwealth Press Union, London condemned the assassination and said,

His death marks a true low point in the history of a country that has such a long-established and notable media. I have watched the situation deteriorate so badly over the last few years that we are now at the point where many respected journalists go in fear of their lives, many have left the country and some of the most distinguished have remained but are under constant threats and intimidation.

In a statement ahead of World Press Freedom Day Ban Ki-moon called on the government of Sri Lanka to ensure that those responsible for Lasantha Wickrematunge's murder were found and prosecuted.

An editorial in Time magazine called his death "A personal loss to Time".

Wickrematunge's widow of 13 days, Sonali Samarasinghe Wickrematunge, fled the country a month after Wickrematunge's death and now calls herself an editor in exile.

== Funeral ==
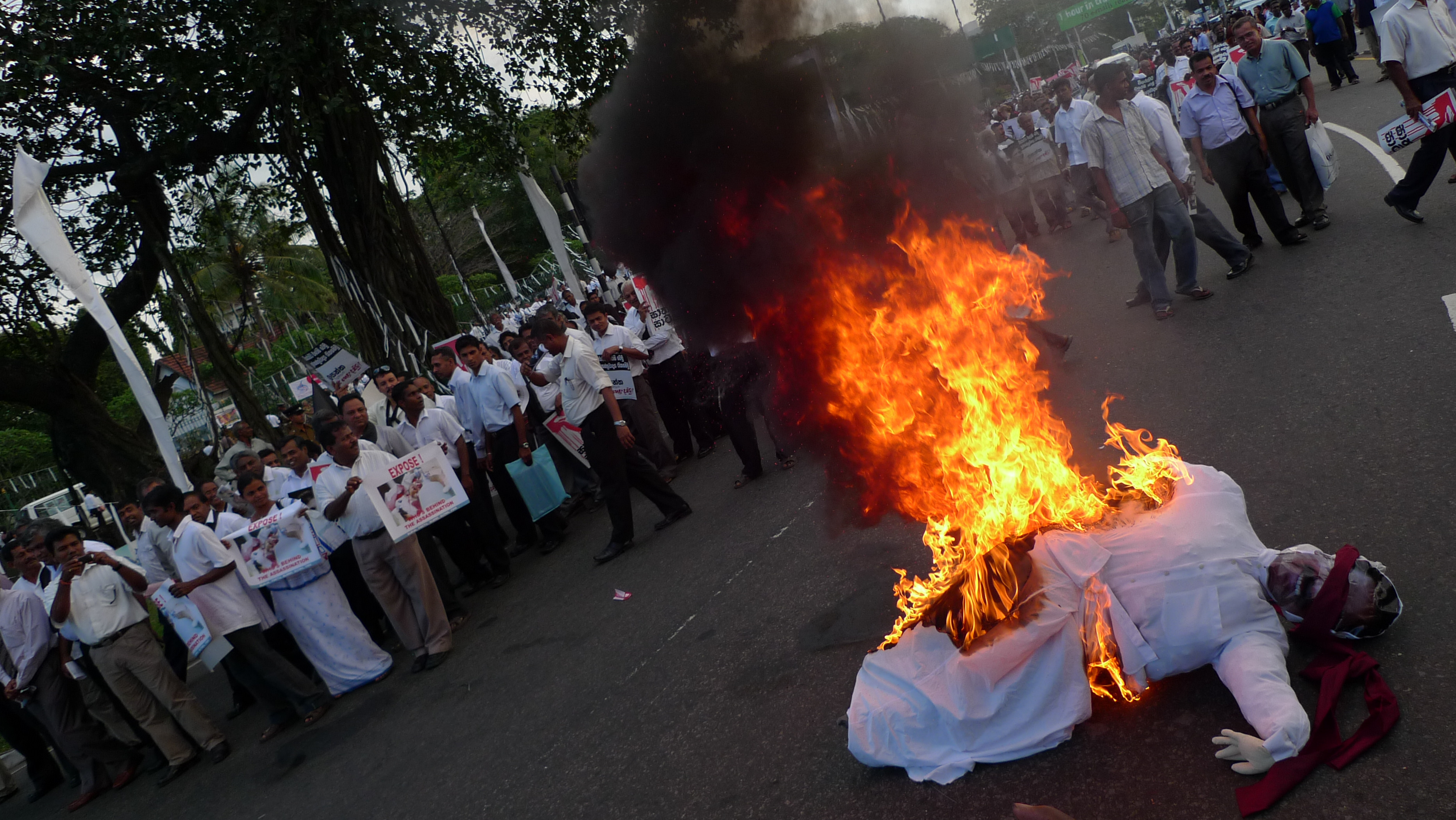
Supporters at the funeral of Lasantha Wickrematunge burn an effigy of the Sri Lankan President, Mahinda Rajapaksa

The funeral of Lasantha Wickrematunge was one of the largest public funerals held in Sri Lanka. Wickrematunge's funeral was open to the public. Opposition leaders, human rights activists and diplomats demonstrated in protest of his killing.

== Investigation ==
After denying all responsibility for the attack the Rajapaksa government called for an investigation. Despite intense media pressure, no one was arrested, and Sri Lankan media speculated that the murder investigation may "end up as a cover-up", and that safeguards for an independent media appeared bleak.

After Mahinda Rajapaksa's defeat at the presidential election in 2015, the new government of President Maithripala Sirisena reopened the investigation over allegations that former Defence Secretary Gotabhaya Rajapaksa ordered the assassination.

Ranil Wickremesinghe, the former Prime Minister, accused Sarath Fonseka, the former army commander, of the murder of Lasantha Wickrematunge in 2008 and 2009. In 2011, the former MP Rajiva Wijesinha told the BBC Sinhala Service that the British High Commission in Colombo had told him it possessed evidence that Fonseka was involved in the assassination of Wickrematunge. According to Fonseka, the order for the assassination was given by Gotabaya.

In October 2016, a retired intelligence officer committed suicide and left a note claiming he was the killer of Wickrematunge and that the intelligence officers that were arrested and under investigation were innocent. The intelligence officer's family reported to police that they did not believe the officer's death was a suicide.

Investigation done by the CID revealed that the Sri Lankan military had abducted two Tamil youths named Balraj Ram Prakash and Kumarasingham Vishnukumar riding a motorcycle in Vavuniya on 18 January 2009, murdered them and stole their motorcycle in an attempt to frame the LTTE for Wickrematunge's assassination.

== See also ==
- Lasantha Wickrematunge
- The Sunday Leader
- Gotabaya Rajapaksa
