= Shani Abeysekara =

Sri Lankan police officer and former Director of Criminal Investigation Department

- Police career
- Country: Sri Lanka Police
- Allegiance: Sri Lanka
- Department: Special Task Force, Criminal Investigation Department
- Service years: 1986 - 2021 2025- Now
- Rank: Deputy Inspector General
- Other work: Secretary to the Ministry of Public Security

Shani Abeysekara is a Sri Lankan senior police officer. A Deputy Inspector General, Abeysekara is the former and current director of Criminal Investigation Department and current Director of the Criminal Intelligence Analysis and Prevention Division.

== Police career ==
Abeysekara joined the Sri Lanka Police on 10 February 1986 as a Probationary Sub Inspector of Police undergoing training at the Sri Lanka Police College, Kalutara. He served in the VIP Security Division of Special Task Force and the President's Security Division. He was transferred to the Criminal Investigation Department (CID) in 1999 on a special request made by the DIG Punya de Silva. Abeysekara was appointed Director CID in 2017 and was served in that capacity till he was transferred on 21 November 2019 as the Personal Assistant to the Deputy Inspector General of Police in Galle range following the 2019 Presidential election and was interdicted from the Police service on 7 January 2020.

He has investigated several high-profile crimes including the Attempted assassination of President Kumaratunga in 1999, Bandaranaike Airport attack in 2001, Udathalawinna massacre in 2001, Royal Park murder in 2005, attempted assassination of General Sarath Fonseka, Angulana double murder, the disappearance of Prageeth Eknaligoda, the killing of Lasantha Wickrematunge and the 2019 Sri Lanka Easter bombings. He received a commendation from the Secretary-General of INTERPOL for his support to the Response Team that responded to the Easter Sunday attacks in Sri Lanka. He had been the key prosecution witness in over 100 trials including over 20 murder trials that led to convictions.

The Government of President Gotabaya Rajapaksa accused Abeysekara of carrying out a political agenda, while the opposition the Rajapaksa government took revenge on Abeysekara, having transferred him from the CID soon after its election. In January 2020, he was suspended from the Service of Sri Lanka Police after his leaked telephone conversations with Ranjan Ramanayake which was termed as a discredit to the police services of the country. On 25 November 2020, he was tested positive for COVID-19 and was transferred to a different prison. On 16 June 2021, he was granted bail by the Court of Appeal after spending jail term for nearly one year. Abeysekara retired from the police in 2021.

In June 2024, he joined the Retired Police Collective of the National People's Power (NPP) at its first meeting.

Following the election of Anura Kumara Dissanayake as President in September 2024, Abeysekara has been appointed to Director the newly created Criminal Intelligence Analysis and Prevention Division with the National Police Commission having approved the reappointment on a contract basis for one year. He was thereafter appointed Director of the CID in July 2025. He led the investigation into misuse of state funds by former President Ranil Wickremesinghe, leading to his arrest in August 2025.

== Controversies ==
His telephone conversations with politician Ranjan Ramanayake and some high-profile figures including judges were leaked in the media. Other several telephone conversations involving him were also leaked to the public and the recordings suggested that he used the law in unlawful manner to favour Ranjan Ramanayake's request. Several audio recordings were found during a raid at his house and was also accused of causing disruption to police investigations during the raid.

Shani Abeysekara was also blamed for the escape of Nishantha de Silva with his family in order to seek asylum following the conclusion of the 2019 Sri Lankan presidential election where Gotabaya Rajapaksa emerged victorious.

In November 2019, Shani Abeysekara's name was also mentioned in a mafia to tarnish the image of SLPP formed government in a scenario related to the abduction of a Sri Lankan Swiss embassy staff member who claimed that she was investigated nearly for one hour. She was released on the same day after two hours of inquiry. The Swiss government immediately requested the Sri Lankan authorities to conduct inquiry regarding the probe. The local embassy employee was dragged into a car by a gang of unknown men to obtain information related to the Swiss embassy and information about Silva.

Investigations on mobile phones found that she was in contact with the former CID Director Shani Abeysekara, former Lake House Chairman Krishantha Cooray and Darisha Bastian, the former Editor in Chief of the Sunday Observer days before she claimed to have been abducted. Krishantha Cooray traveled to Malaysia in December as investigation happened while Dharisha Bastian travelled to Switzerland before the "abduction".

On 31 July 2020, he was arrested by the Colombo Crime Division for allegations regarding fabricating false evidence with regard to a court case against former police officer Vass Gunawardane in connection with the murder of businessman Mohammed Siyam in 2013. He was remanded until 7 August 2020. However, he was further remanded up until October 2020. In December 2020, Shani filed petition against his arrest at the Galle High Court but his plea was rejected. In August 2023, he was acquitted on a charge of fabricating false evidence by the Gampaha Magistrate on the Attorney General’s instructions.

In October 2024, Pivithuru Hela Urumaya (PHU) leader, former parliamentarian Udaya Gammanpila, stated that Abeysekara should be removed from his police appointment since a secret report of the Presidential Committee into the 2019 Sri Lanka Easter bombings stated that the State Intelligence Service (SIS) had informed Seneviratne, in his capacity as director of the Criminal Investigation Department, of the imminent attacks and he failed to take action.
