= Sonali Samarasinghe =

Sri Lankan investigative reporter and editor

Sonali Samarasinghe Wickrematunge is a Sri Lankan lawyer and an investigative reporter and editor. She worked as a columnist for the Sunday Leader. She was the founding editor of the weekly Morning Leader. She did her LLB from the University of London and attended Sri Lanka Law College and she was admitted to the Supreme Court of Sri Lanka as an attorney at law. She was a Neiman Fellow at Harvard University and an international journalist in residence at the City University of New York's Graduate School of Journalism.

She was the wife of journalist Lasantha Wickrematunge who was assassinated in 2009. She had to flee Sri Lanka to the United States after threats to her life after Wickrematunge's assassination. She is the editor of the website Lanka Standard. She was awarded the Global Shining Light Award for Investigative Journalism by the Global Investigative Journalism Conference in 2008 and the Pen International awarded her the Oxfam Novib/PEN Award for Freedom of Expression in 2009.
