= Eliyantha White =

Sri Lankan spiritual healer (1971–2021)

Eliyantha Lindsay White (1971 – 22 September 2021) was a Sri Lankan shaman who used traditional herbs.

He treated several world leaders and many cricket players.

Despite claiming to have developed a cure for COVID-19, White died of the virus on 22 September 2021, at a private hospital in Colombo.

== Early life ==
Eliyantha White is of British heritage. He appears to have grown up in the town of Kalubowila, Sri Lanka and began his treatments at the age of 12 by treating someone who was suffering from an incurable cancer. He claimed to be able to materialise medicine through spirits of Rishis, which he then used to cure people. He studied traditional medicine in both Sri Lanka and India.

== Rise to fame ==
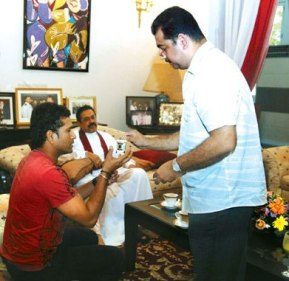
Eliyantha White giving medications to Sachin Tendulkar

White initially started treating people at Eeyamporuwa Temple in Madiwela. From here, his popularity rose to a point where he was apparently hounded in the streets and was treating over a thousand patients a day. He was always committed to treating people free of charge.

In March 2010, Eliyantha invited David Beckham to Sri Lanka for treatment of an injury. He claimed to be able to put Beckham back on the field in three days. It is unclear whether Beckham took up this offer.

== Controversies ==
Some of White's treatments have been the subject of intense controversy.

In May 2011, Upul Tharanga, a Sri Lankan cricketer failed a dope test conducted by ICC and it was rumoured that Tharanga had been treated by White and the medication given by White contained the banned substance, due to which Tharanga failed the dope test. However, Tharanga has not officially confirmed that he was treated by White. But Sri Lankan sports minister confirmed that White treated Tharanga. However Tharanga had been treated by other doctors as well.

On 15 July 2011, the International Cricket Council's Independent Anti-Doping Tribunal decision in the case of Tharanga discussed in some detail the question whether Eliyantha White's medicine may have contained banned substances.

Despite claims that Eliyantha was also the Sri Lankan president's personal physician, this fact was sometimes disputed.

== Political status ==
In April 2012, during an adjournment debate in Parliament on legal recognition to alternative systems of treatment, members were unanimous in complimenting the physician’s performance. Several opposition parliamentarians praised White for his abilities and requested more security for him. MP A. H. M. Azwer tabled in the House letters of appreciation from many persons including Minister Lakshman Seneviratne and Bandula Gunawardena, Lal Wickrematunge, national cricketers Kumar Sangakkara and Tilakaratne Dilshan.

== Public figures treated by White ==
- Himeth Thewmika
- Harsha de Silva
- Bipasha Basu
- Salman Khan
- Sachin Tendulkar
- Ashish Nehra
- Ian Chappell
- Lasith Malinga
- Lakshman Senewiratne
- Bandula Gunawardena
- Kiribathgoda Gnananada Thero
- Lasantha Wickrematunge
- Lal Wickrematunge
- 'Bothale Gamini', the elephant
- Latha Walpola, singer

Although some public figures seem to have had well publicised success with Eliyantha White's treatments, it is unclear whether regular patients enjoy the same. It is said that he has successfully treated thousands of people in the past at Eeyamporuwa temple at Madiwela.
