= The Morning Leader =

Sri Lankan English-language newspaper

- Type: Newspaper
- Owner: Leader Publications (Pvt) Ltd
- Language: English
- Headquarters: No. 24 Katukurunduwatte Road, Ratmalana, Sri Lanka
- Website: The Morning Leader

The Morning Leader was a Sri Lankan English-language newspaper. It is published by Leader Publications (Pvt) Ltd. Its sister publications are The Sunday Leader and Iruresa. The Morning Leader was refounded by Lasantha Wickrematunge who was assassinated in January 2009. It is known for its independent news coverage and it has faced arson attacks from men with complicity from the Sri Lankan authorities.
