= Frederica Jansz =

Sri Lankan journalist)

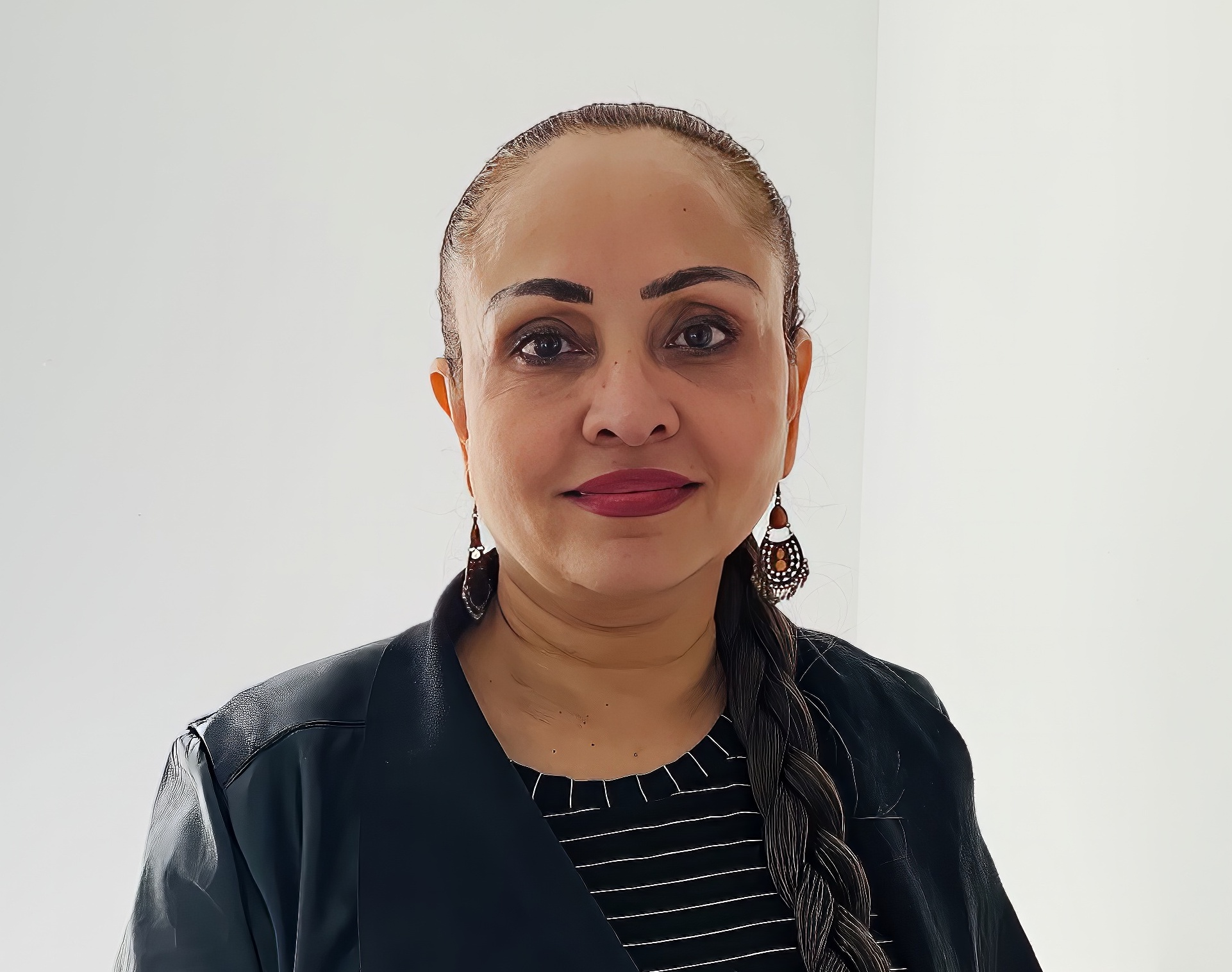
- Jansz in 2023
- Born: Colombo, Sri Lanka
- Occupation: Journalist
- Children: 2

Frederica Jansz is a Sri Lankan journalist and former editor of The Sunday Leader.

During her time at The Sunday Leader, she was highly critical of Sri Lanka's government. Jansz became editor of the paper after her predecessor Lasantha Wickrematunge was assassinated, and fell subject to frequent intimidation and harassment, including numerous death threats.

After being dismissed from her position at the newspaper in September 2012 by its new, government-friendly owner, Jansz emigrated to the US, where she now lives.

== Personal life ==
Jansz is a Burgher of Dutch origin. She has two children.

== Media and journalism ==
Jansz "began her career as a war reporter for Visnews, the television arm of Reuters, during the Sri Lankan Civil War." She conducted interviews with government soldiers and guerilla forces, and also served as an investigative journalist covering the Sri Lankan parliament. "As one of the only female journalists in Sri Lanka, she established herself as a respected political reporter and became the anchor of a morning news show."

=== The Sunday Leader ===
She joined The Sunday Leader, which has been described as a “politically fueled investigative newspaper” and as Sri Lanka’s “lone independent voice,” in 1994. She was subsequently asked by Lal Wickrematunge to become its editor in January 2009 following the assassination of editor-in-chief Lasantha Wickrematunge, under whom she had trained. Wickrematunge "was ambushed by men on motorbikes who shot him through the head." Like Wickrematunge, Jansz received threats due to her work, including death threats. She has stated that she began receiving these threats shortly after becoming editor. "I received one letter in red ink, saying 'I will chop you up if you don't stop writing this,'" she told the Telegraph. The handwriting was the same as in a threatening letter that had been sent to Lasantha three weeks before his murder.

On 22 October 2009 Jansz and News Editor Munza Mushtaq were sent hand written death threats through the post. "We will slice you up if you do not stop your writing," the letters threatened. Jansz told Reporters Without Borders that Wickrematunge had received the same letter, which his secretary had filed away. Jansz said the letters were compared by a graphologist who confirmed, "all three letters were authored by the same palm.' In October 2010 the Sri Lanka Guardian magazine reported that Sri Lankan military intelligence was plotting to assassinate Jansz. Jansz was threatened and insulted by Defence Secretary Gotabhaya Rajapaksa in a phone call on 6 July 2012. According to Jansz the Defence Secretary said, "Yes I threatened you. Your type of journalists are pigs who eat shit!...I will put you in jail!... People will kill you!!! People hate you!!!".

At the end of the Sri Lankan civil war, in 2009, Jansz had written an article suggesting that Sri Lanka's defence secretary, Gotabaya Rajapaksa, "shared a similar psychological profile to that of the leader of the Tigers (a sworn enemy)." In the winter of 2010, “Jansz interviewed the opposition candidate” in the presidential elections, “a former army commander in the Sri Lankan army,” who confirmed rumours “that the army had shot a group of Tamil Tiger rebel leaders as they attempted to surrender at the end of the war.” When Jansz ran the story, it led to the opposition’s election loss, thus making the newspaper “an enemy out of both the government and the opposition.”

In 2012, Jansz learned that Rajapaksa had arranged for SriLankan Airlines to bump a flightload of passengers, in order to transport a puppy from Switzerland to Sri Lanka for his wife. When Jansz called for his comment he said angrily: “If you and I were at the same function together and I were to point you out…90 percent of people there would want to see you dead…they will kill you.” He went on to scream at her, "You are a f.... pig who eats shit," repeatedly. She printed the full transcript of his tirade under the headline “Gota Goes Berserk.” Jansz said that the article caused “a huge backlash against him” for which he reportedly “would never forgive” her. “People were saying there was a good chance I was going to go the same way as Lasantha had. The writing was on the wall.” After she ran the story, she “was followed by motorbikes” and “received death threats.” The groups Article 19 and PEN International expressed concern for her safety and called for an investigation into the threats.

=== Dismissal ===
In September 2012, Asanga Seneviratne, an ally of Sri Lankan President Mahinda Rajapaksa, bought a 72% stake in The Sunday Leader and its sister newspaper, Iruresa. He bought the paper with financial help from the government. According to Jansz, Seneviratne asked her stop publishing articles critical of the Sri Lankan government and the Rajapaksa family. She refused, and on 21 September 2012 she was sacked as editor. She was replaced by Sakuntala Perera. "The new management appointed a new editor even as I was sitting in the office," Jansz said in July 2013. Seneviratne disputed Jansz’s account of her dismissal.

== Resettlement in US ==
Prior to her sacking, Jansz had applied via the Australian High Commission in Colombo for a humanitarian visa to resettle in Australia, citing death threats. Her application was turned down in October 2012 "on the grounds that she was not out of Sri Lanka at the time of making the claim." The US Ambassador to Sri Lanka, however, “befriended Jansz and gave her and her sons entry into the United States.” The US visa issued by the ambassador allowed her to flee with her two sons to Seattle in October 2012. She applied for asylum, and initially settled in Puyallup, Washington. She chose Washington State because of its proximity to Canada, where she has a cousin.

In 2014, she moved to Seattle, and enrolled at the Art Institute of Seattle (AIS). She majored in Applied Arts and Interior Design, graduating in 2017. She has since worked in both residential and commercial interior design. In an interview with David Blair, of The Telegraph newspaper, she said it was, "starting from scratch – all over again."

In November 2012 she said that she would never return to Sri Lanka. "There's no going back for me, absolutely not. I feel lucky that I got out of this alive." In June 2013 Jansz said that it gave her "terrible pain" to think about Sri Lanka. "It's the mundane things that I miss—I dream of this one sandy, gravel road in Sri Lanka. I desperately miss my home. I loved my country and I never wanted to leave, but I had to force myself to put it all behind me….As long as I look back, I cannot move forward. And every day, I get a little stronger."

Jansz was a guest speaker at the Oslo Freedom Forum in May 2014, where she spoke about the lack of media freedom in Sri Lanka and the continuing harassment and threats to journalists.

== Honors and awards ==
Jansz won the Editor's Guild of Sri Lanka Journalist of the Year Award in 2004, and the Editors Guild Prof. K. Kailasapathy award for Reporting Under Special Circumstances, in 2009.

Media offices
Preceded by Lasantha Wickrematunge	Editor of The Sunday Leader; 2009–2012	Succeeded by Sakuntala Perera
