= Asanga Seneviratne =

Sri Lankan entrepreneur and investor (born 1965)

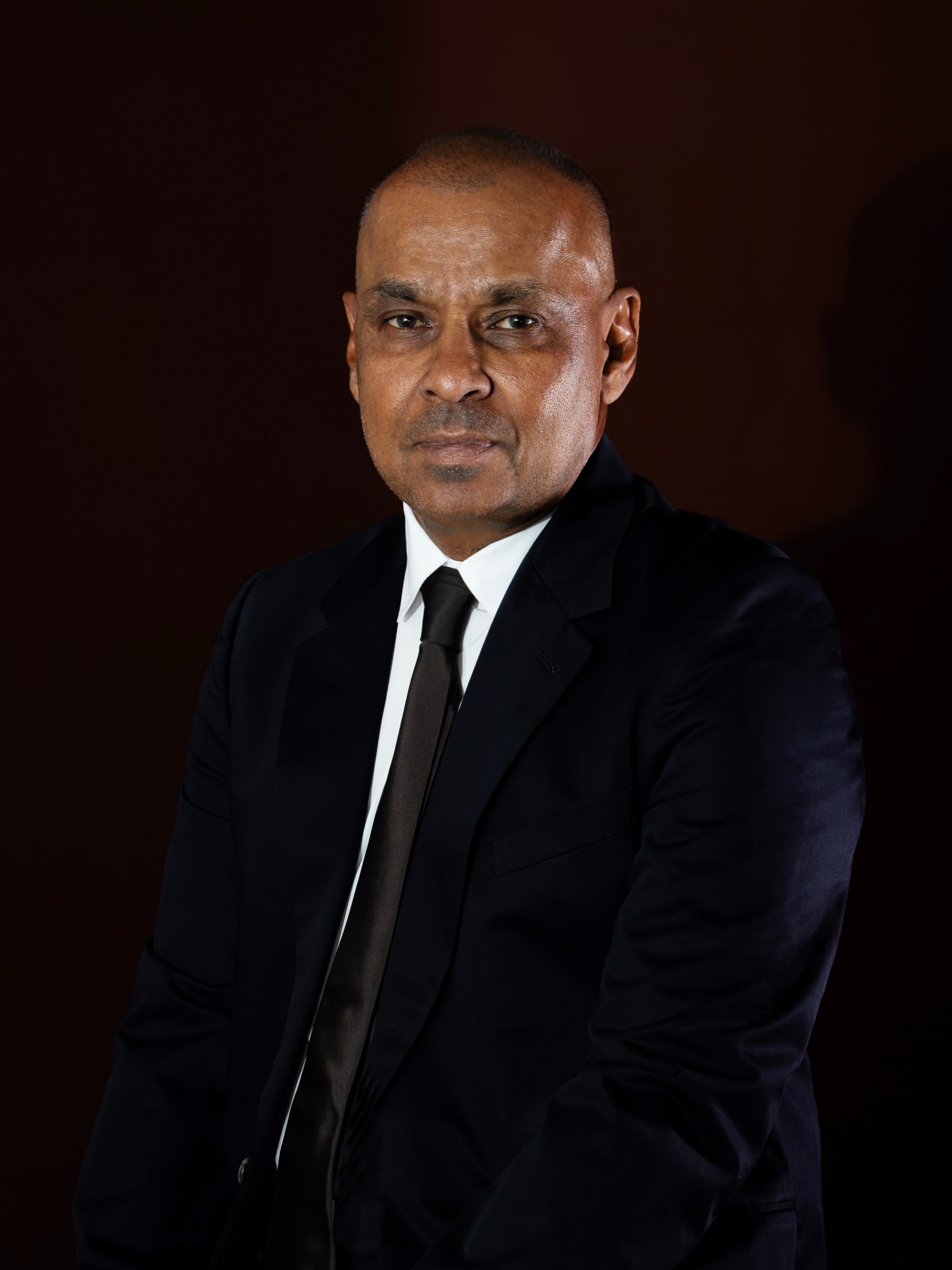
- Seneviratne in 2024
- Born: May 21, 1965 (age 61); Colombo
- Education: St. Thomas' College, Mount Lavinia
- Occupations: Investor, Businessman, Sportsman
- Spouse: Manjula Seneviratne
- Children: 2

Asanga Chandana Seneviratne (born May 1965) is a Sri Lankan entrepreneur, investor and former national sportsman. He is the founder and managing director of Anilana Hotels & Properties PLC, a leading hotel and resort chain in Sri Lanka. He currently serves as the principal of ACS Capital, a capital markets operator in Sri Lanka. Asanga has been the head of 14 different companies, according to The Wall Street Journal. He was elected twice to the board of directors of the Colombo Stock Exchange. A sportsman by nature, he served as vice president to the Board of Control of Sri Lanka Cricket, served as president of Sri Lanka Rugby Football Union, serves on the executive committee of Asia Rugby, and serves as president of Sri Lanka Baseball.

== Early life ==
Asanga was born and raised in Colombo Sri Lanka, where he received his early education at St. Thomas' College, Mount Lavinia. During his school years, he represented the school in both rugby and cricket. His interest in sports stemmed from his father, Asoka Seneviratne, who was an enthusiastic promoter of cue sports. Although his ambition was to become a professional cricketer, the tumultuous period in Sri Lanka in the 1980s from both the civil war and the JVP insurgency led to a general decline in cricket activity in the country. This led to his only being able to play for the under-23 cricket team. He then moved overseas to play cricket in Australia and the United Kingdom for the next five years.

== Career ==
=== Investment and capital markets ===
After playing overseas for five years, Asanga returned to Sri Lanka beginning his professional career as a stockbroker for Forbes & Walker Tea Brokers, a brokerage firm in business since around 1881. Having been approached by his friend Rusi Captain, the former national champion of table tennis in Sri Lanka, Asanga joined Asia Securities, an independent stockbroking and research firm. Later, together with Captain, Asanga founded Asia Capital PLC, which is currently the largest investment bank to be listed on the Colombo Stock Exchange. It went public in 1994. He was instrumental in expanding the client base and enhancing the firm's capabilities in equity trading and investment advisory services. This was done by partnering with international brokerage firms such as WI Carr from Hong Kong, and the New York-based Auerbach Grayson. Asanga was the chief executive officer of Asia Securities from 1991 to 2010 and board member from 1994 to 2010. At Asia Capital PLC, he was the chief executive officer from 2001 to 2010.

By 2010, Asanga had sold his shares at Asia Capital PLC and stepped down from the board. This was mainly because of a potential internal share exchange that would have resulted in Asanga becoming a minority shareholder with another partner becoming the controlling shareholder. Asanga is also quoted stating that he wanted to do something new as he had been with the Asia group for around 20 years at this point. In 2011, Asanga emerged as non-executive director of Nation Lanka Finance PLC, another major finance company in the country. He was also a shareholder in the company. During his directorship at Nation Lanka, Asanga helped revive Ceylinco Investment Corporation Ltd (CICL), a subsidiary of Nation Lanka that had faced financial troubles after the Ceylinco crisis in the late 2000s. He did this through investments from another company of his, Investor Access Equities (Pvt) Ltd. During his time with the Investor Access group, Asanga is known to have pioneered the CDAX system, which was the first online trading system in Sri Lanka, which enabled direct access to the stock market from the client's computer. In 2015, Asanga sold his entire stake in Nation Lanka Finance PLC, including his stake in the company through Investor Access Equities, which amounted to around 33% ownership in Nation Lanka. In 2016, Asanga purchased Nation Lanka Equities (Pvt) Limited, a subsidiary of Nation Lanka Finance PLC for LKR 160 million.

In 2013, he was elected as a board member of the Colombo Stock Exchange. By this time, Asanga had already served on the boards of multiple investment companies. He had already been involved with the stock exchange, especially as chairman of the Stock Brokers' Association between 2005 and 2006. He served on the board of the Colombo Stock Exchange until 2017. He was re-elected to the board in 2021 for the second time serving until 2023. In 2012, Asanga purchased The Sunday Leader newspaper, gaining a 72% stake in the company. In 2024, he rebranded his firm Nation Lanka Equities to ACS Capital, a licensed stockbroking firm.

=== Hospitality ===
Since the mid-2000s, Asanga sought to tap into the Sri Lankan property and hospitality market, especially as the civil war was ending. To do this, Asanga served as the director of Taru Villas Holdings (Pvt) Limited, a boutique hotel chain in Sri Lanka. He then moved on to found Anilana Hotels and Properties Ltd in May 2010. The Anilana brand would go on to become a reputed hotel name in Sri Lanka, especially for its hotels in the country's east, namely in Pasikudah and Trincomalee. Asanga sought to be take first mover advantage of opening hotels in the east coast after the war, and he was successful. Since the ceasefire agreement between the government and the LTTE in the 2000s, Asanga had begun investing in property in attractive locations in the island. By 2013, Anilana went public, issuing an initial public offering of LKR 960 million, becoming Anilana Hotels & Properties PLC.

=== Sport ===
Asanga has a distinguished history in sports, both as an athlete and an administrator. During his time at St. Thomas' College, he played both cricket and rugby between 1982 and 1984. He later played club rugby for Ceylonese Rugby & Football Club (CR&FC) and Colombo Hockey and Football Club (CH&FC). At CR&FC, he scored over 100 first class points in rugby. He then played rugby for the Sri Lankan national team for 2 years from 1988. Initially playing in the position of fly half, Asanga later moved to center. During this same period, Asanga also kept his foot in cricket, where he played for the Colombo Cricket Club (CCC). He played for the premier trophy (now known as Major League Tournament) until 1995, during which time he captained the CCC from 1992 to 1994. He also represented the Sri Lankan national team led by Arjuna Ranathunga in under-23 cricket when they played against the Pakistan team led by Saleem Malik in 1985. In cricket, he played as a left handed batsman and slow left arm orthodox bowler.

In addition to playing sports on national level, Asanga also functioned as a coach and then administrator for the sports. In the early 2000s, Asanga coached the national under-19 rugby team. He also coached the St. Thomas' College team. In 2007, he was elected to be the deputy president of the Sri Lanka Rugby Football Union (now known as Sri Lanka Rugby). In 2009, at the resignation of top officials at Sri Lanka Rugby, Asanga was set to take the top post of president. However, an intervention by the then-Minister of Sports Gamini Lokuge, resulted in Sri Lanka Rugby leadership going to the hands of an interim committee. Later in 2012, Asanga was elected uncontested to the post of president at Sri Lanka Rugby. At the same time as this, he was also elected the vice president of Sri Lanka Cricket in 2012, giving him simultaneous leadership of the two largest sports bodies in the country.

From 2013 to 2015, Asanga served as the honorary secretary general to Asia Rugby. In 2021, Asanga was elected to serve in the executive committee of Asia Rugby, filling the vacancy after the resignation of Gondo Gambiro. He also chaired the Sri Lankan Rugby Advisory Committee in the same year. In 2021, Asanga was elected as the president of Sri Lanka Baseball. In the same year, he was also elected to chairman of the Competitions and High-Performance Sports committee of the National Olympic Committee of Sri Lanka. He also serves as the vice president of the National Olympic Committee.

== Controversies and criticism ==
Despite his successes, Asanga's career has seen its share of controversies and criticisms.

=== Anilana Hotels ===
In 2016, it was reported that business mogul Dhammika Perera was to purchase Anilana. However, it was later revealed that this deal had fallen through. In 2017, Anilana was said to be in debt mainly to Sampath Bank PLC. However, according to The Wall Street Journal, in 2023, Anilana reported a positive cash & short-term investments growth figure of 158.10% with a total liabilities to assets ratio of 66.66%. As managing director of Anilana, Asanga had allegedly executed a land sale which was unauthorized by the board in 2024.

=== Purchase of The Sunday Leader ===
Asanga's purchase of The Sunday Leader newspaper in 2012 was criticized as a politically motivated move, especially after the controversial 2009 assassination of its editor Lasantha Wickremathunge. After his emergence as owner, the then-editor Frederica Jansz, a Wickremathunge loyalist was fired from the company. Jansz later sought asylum from Australia claiming to have received death threats from the political leadership. However, her asylum was rejected by the Australian authorities after it was found that she was not facing persecution. In response to the claims that Jansz was fired, Asanga had responded that she had willingly resigned after he placed more oversight on what was published, after repeated violations from her part. These violations had reportedly opened up the company to several lawsuits, which the new ownership wanted to resolve.

=== Rajapaksa sons in rugby ===
It was alleged that after Asanga was elected into leadership positions in Sri Lanka Rugby, he gave prominence to Yoshitha Rajapaksa, a son of former president Mahinda Rajapaksa, for the post of rugby captain. This resulted in boycotts of the national team by certain players who were allegedly overlooked for captaincy. Asanga had maintained that no favoritism had taken place and that those who were refusing to represent the national team could face bans in local rugby. Later in 2013, President Rajapaksa's eldest son Namal Rajapaksa was also made captain after the former had an injury.

=== Concerns against cricketers ===
In 2020, Asanga reportedly berated former top national cricket players including Mahela Jayawardene for opposing the construction of a new cricket stadium in Homagama. The SLC and the Sri Lankan government had announced plans to build a new international cricket stadium, which was then opposed by former national players including Jayawardena and Roshan Mahanama. This later led to the plans being terminated by the government. The national players, namely Jayawardena, were of the view that Sri Lanka Cricket had not done much for school-level cricket for the previous 10 years. Asanga responded stating that Sri Lanka has one of the best junior cricket programs worldwide. Asanga further commented criticizing the former Sri Lankan players stating that they "have played just a minor role after their retirements to contribute to any meaningful manner in Sri Lanka cricket". He stated that they should "do the work necessary and not just offer plans that no one will follow". Asanga was of the view that Sri Lanka needed a larger stadium of around 50,000 capacity as the R. Premadasa Stadium in Colombo could only hold 24,000 which was later upgraded to 34,000.

== Personal life ==
Asanga is married to Manjula Seneviratne, a co-founder and shareholder of Anilana Hotels. They have two children.
