= Wijesundera =

Wijesundera or Wijesundara (Sinhala: විජේසුන්දර, romanized: Vijēsundara) is a Sinhalese surname. Notable people with the surname include:

== Wijesundara ==
- Isitha Wijesundara (born 1997), Sri Lankan cricketer
- Isuri Wijesundara, Sri Lankan-American actress
- Menaka Wijesundara, Sri Lankan puisne justice of the Supreme Court
- Rohana Bandara Wijesundara (born 1977), Sri Lankan politician

== Wijesundera ==
- Deepali Wijesundera, Sri Lankan judge of the Court of Appeal
- Stanley Wijesundera (1923–1989), Sri Lankan academic
