= White Flag case =

The White Flag Case is a court case in which the former Sri Lankan Army chief Sarath Fonseka was prosecuted for an interview which he gave to Frederica Jansz, editor of the Sunday Leader, in which he is stated to have said that surrendering Liberation Tigers of Tamil Eelam (LTTE) cadres were executed and not allowed to surrender on the orders of Gotabaya Rajapaksa. He was convicted and jailed for 3 years imprisonment for that interview. A three bench court, in which Deepali Wijesundera was one of three judges of Colombo High Court trial-at-bar, delivered the verdict.
