= Iruresa =

Newspaper in Sri Lanka

- Type: Weekly newspaper
- Owner(s): Asanga Seneviratne (72%); Lal Wickrematunge (28%)
- Publisher: Leader Publications (Private) Limited
- Founded: 1994
- Language: Sinhala
- Headquarters: No. 24 Katukurunduwatte Road, Ratmalana, Sri Lanka
- Sister newspapers: The Sunday Leader

Iruresa is a Sinhala language Sri Lankan weekly newspaper published by Lithira Publications (Private) Limited, part of Leader Publications (Private) Limited. It was founded in 1994 and is published from Colombo. Its sister newspapers are The Sunday Leader. Founded by brothers Lasantha Wickrematunge and Lal Wickrematunge, the newspaper is known for its outspoken and controversial news coverage.

Iruresa was founded under the Irudina name. The Irudina name was registered by President's Counsel Nalin Ladduwahetty.

On the night of 16 October 2005 armed men entered the printing press of Leader Publications, threatened the manager with "dire consequences" if the newspapers continued to be printed and then set fire to bundles of newspapers. The attack came after The Sunday Leader had published an article which alleged that Prime Minister Mahinda Rajapaksa had misappropriated tsunami relief funds.

The printing press of Leader Publications in Ratmalana was burnt down on 21 November 2007 by a group of armed masked men who entered the building, poured petrol on the printing machines and set fire to them. The attack came after The Morning Leader had been critical of the Asian Tribune's relationship with a government backed paramilitary group.

Irudina journalist Dileesha Abeysundera was the target of a kidnapping attempt on 28 September 2009 when a group of unidentified men tried to force their way into her home in Borella.

After Lasantha Wickrematunge's assassination in 2009 Ladduwahetty demanded Rs. 3 million from Lal Wickrematunge for use of the Irudina name. Lal Wickrematunge renamed the newspaper Iruresa.

In September 2012 Asanga Seneviratne, an ally of President Mahinda Rajapaksa, bought a 72% stake in the Iruresa and its sister newspaper The Sunday Leader. Seneviratne is managing director of Asia Fort Asset Management (Pvt) Ltd and vice president of Sri Lanka Cricket. He is also president of Sri Lanka Rugby Football Union and controversially appointed President Rajapaksa's son Yoshitha Rajapaksa as captain of the Sri Lanka national rugby union team. The Sunday Leader had published a number of reports exposing Seneviratne's property developments and investment deals.

After buying the Iruresa, Seneviratne bought the Irudina name from Ladduwahetty for Rs. 2 million. The Iruresa is to be renamed Irudina.
