= Leader Publications =

Sri Lankan newspaper publisher

Leader Publications (Pvt) Ltd
- Format: Broadsheet
- Language: English
- Headquarters: Ratmalana, Sri Lanka

Leader Publications is a Sri Lankan newspaper publisher. Its publications are The Sunday Leader, Morning Leader and Iruresa It was founded by Lal Wickrematunge and Lasantha Wickrematunge. It is known for its independent news coverage and it has faced arson attacks from men with complicity from the Sri Lankan authorities.
