= Deepali Wijesundera =

Deepali Wijesundera දීපාලි විජේසුන්දර

Judge of the Court of Appeal of the Democratic Socialist Republic of Sri Lanka

Deepali Wijesundera is a judge of the Court of Appeal of the Democratic Socialist Republic of Sri Lanka.

Wijesundera completed her primary and secondary education from Visakha Vidyalaya, Colombo. She attended the Sri Lanka Law College and was also selected to enter the University of Colombo. In February 1980, she enrolled as an Attorney-at-Law, and also worked as a junior to President's Counsel, VSA Pullenayagam. In 1984, Wijesundera joined the judiciary as a Magistrate

Deepali Wijesundera father was Justice TAD Wijesundera who had served as a judge of the Supreme Court in Sri Lanka and her sister Menaka Wijesundera is a High Court Judge of Sri Lanka.

== Work ==
Wijesundera was one of three judges of Colombo High Court trial-at-bar, who had delivered the verdict, of White Flag case, in which former Army Commander Sarath Fonseka was given three years of imprisonment.
