= Lasantha Wickrematunge =

Sri Lankan journalist (1958–2009)

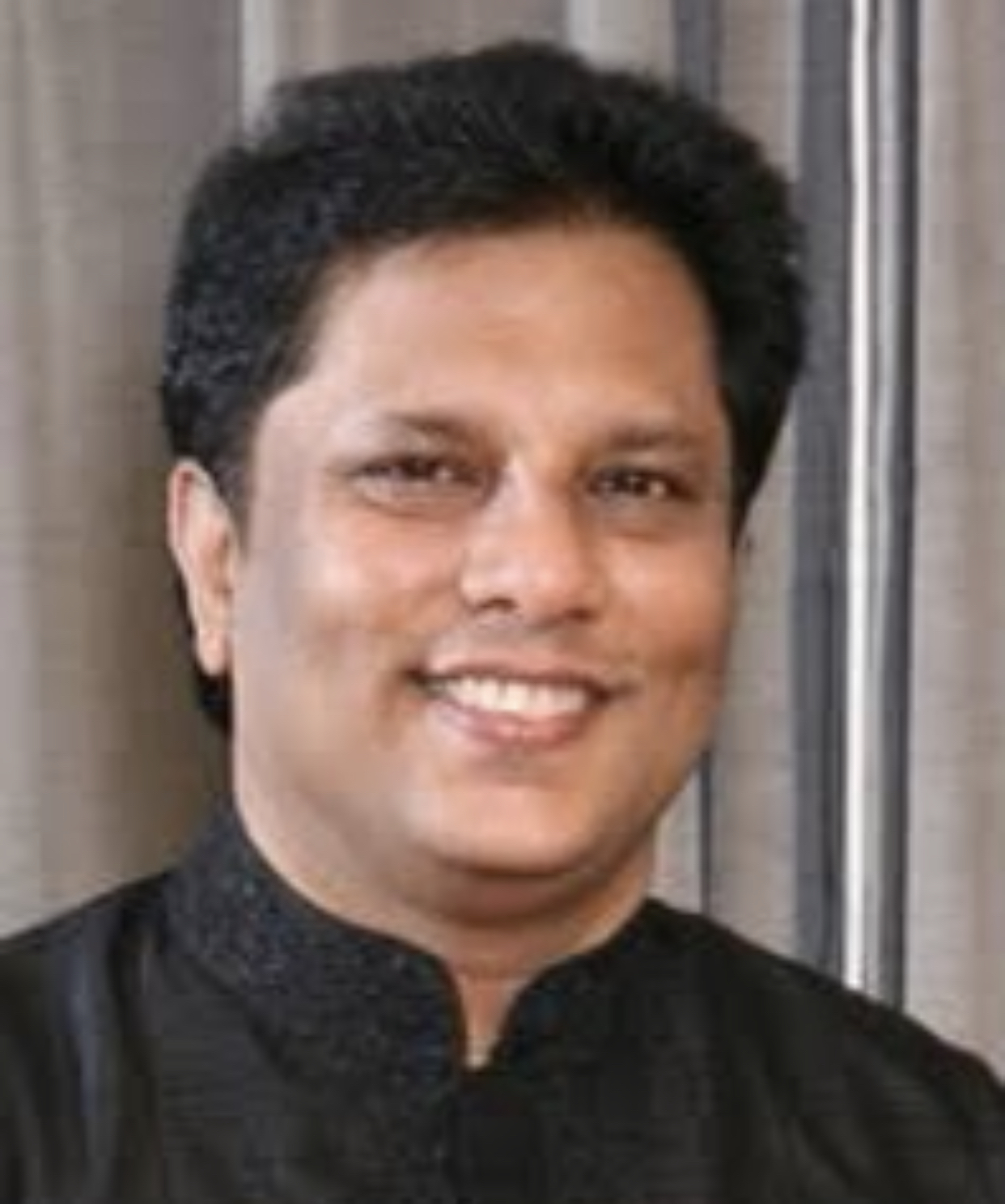
- Born: Lasantha Manilal Wickrematunge; 5 April 1958; Colombo, Sri Lanka
- Died: 8 January 2009 (aged 50); Colombo, Sri Lanka
- Cause of death: Assassination by gunshot
- Resting place: Kanatte Cemetery
- Other name: Suranimala
- Education: St. Benedict's College, Colombo
- Alma mater: Law, University of Colombo
- Occupations: Journalist and politician
- Political party: United National Party
- Other political affiliations: Sri Lanka Freedom Party (until 1992)
- Spouse(s): Raine Wickrematunge (1985–2007); Sonali Samarasinghe (2008–death)
- Children: Avinash Wickrematunge; Ahimsa Wickrematunge; Aadesh Wickrematunge
- Awards: Transparency International Integrity Award (2000); UNESCO/Guillermo Cano World Press Freedom Prize (2009); Harvard University Nieman Foundation for Journalism Lyons Conscience and Integrity Award (2009); James Cameron Memorial Trust Award (2010); National Press Club (United States) John Aubuchon Press Freedom Award (2010)
- Website: www.thesundayleader.lk

Signature
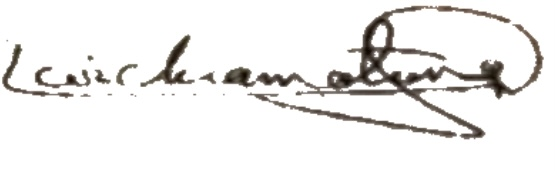

Lasantha Manilal Wickrematunge (Sinhala: ලසන්ත වික්‍රමතුංග, Tamil: லசந்த விக்கிரமதுங்க; 5 April 1958 - 8 January 2009) was a high-profile Sri Lankan journalist, politician, broadcaster, and human rights activist who was assassinated in January 2009.

Wickrematunge was the founder of The Sunday Leader newspaper and Leader Publications and was a virulent critic of the Mahinda Rajapaksa government, and had been locked in a legal battle with Gotabaya Rajapaksa, who was defense secretary at the time and was spearheading the battle against the LTTE rebels. His assassination sent shockwaves across the country, as he was one of the nation's most influential journalists and most-well-known political figures and raised questions about freedom of expression in the country. Wickrematunge's murder was widely condemned across the world. The Daily Mirror called it the "biggest blow" to media freedom in Sri Lanka, and the Editors Guild held the government responsible for the killing for its failure to stop attacks against media personnel. The government also expressed shock at the killing, pledging to do everything in its power to catch his killers. Wickrematunge had been on Amnesty International's endangered list since 1998, when anti-tank shells were fired on his house by unidentified assailants in a van.

== Early life ==
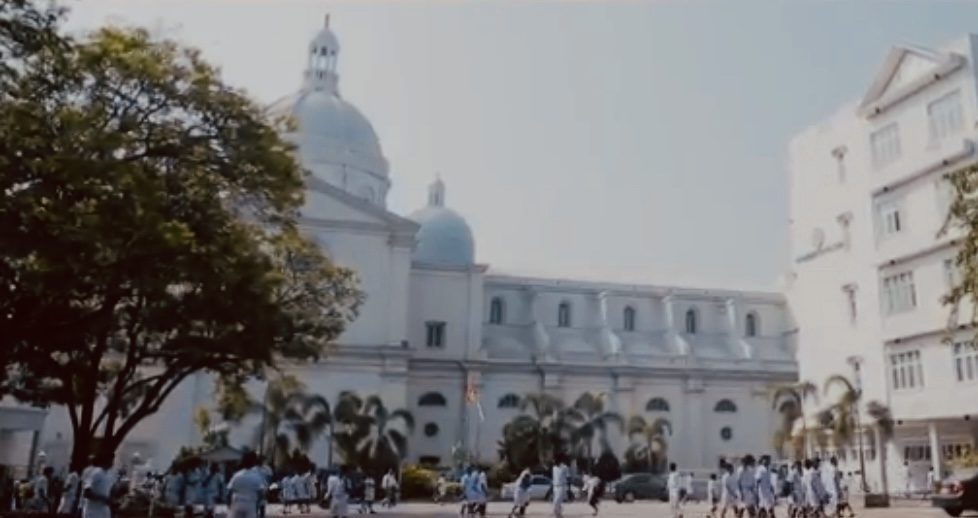
St Benedict's College, the school of Lasantha Wickrematunge

Lasantha Wickrematunge was the youngest of six children born in Kotahena Colombo, to Chandra and Harris Wickrematunge, a prominent politician, who had served as a Municipal Councillor for 30 years and was a former Deputy Mayor. Wickrematunge was the grandnephew of George E. de Silva and Agnes de Silva, cousin of Minnette de Silva, Fredrick de Silva and Desmond de Silva. In his childhood, Wickrematunge attended St Benedict's College. He spent his adolescence in Britain, where he graduated high school and eventually returned to Sri Lanka, where he started law school.

== Career ==
=== Political career ===
Wickrematunge began his career as a lawyer, practicing as a defense attorney for eight years under Ranjit Abeysuriya. Whilst practicing law, Wickrematunge made his way into the political scene before entering into Journalism starting with The Island and Sun newspapers. Wickrematunge contested the 1989 Parliamentary election from a Colombo seat with the Sri Lanka Freedom Party and then became the private secretary to the world's first female prime minister, Sirimavo Bandaranaike. Wickrematunge then crossed parties, moving to the United National Party and was advisor to Ranil Wickremasinghe.

=== Journalism ===
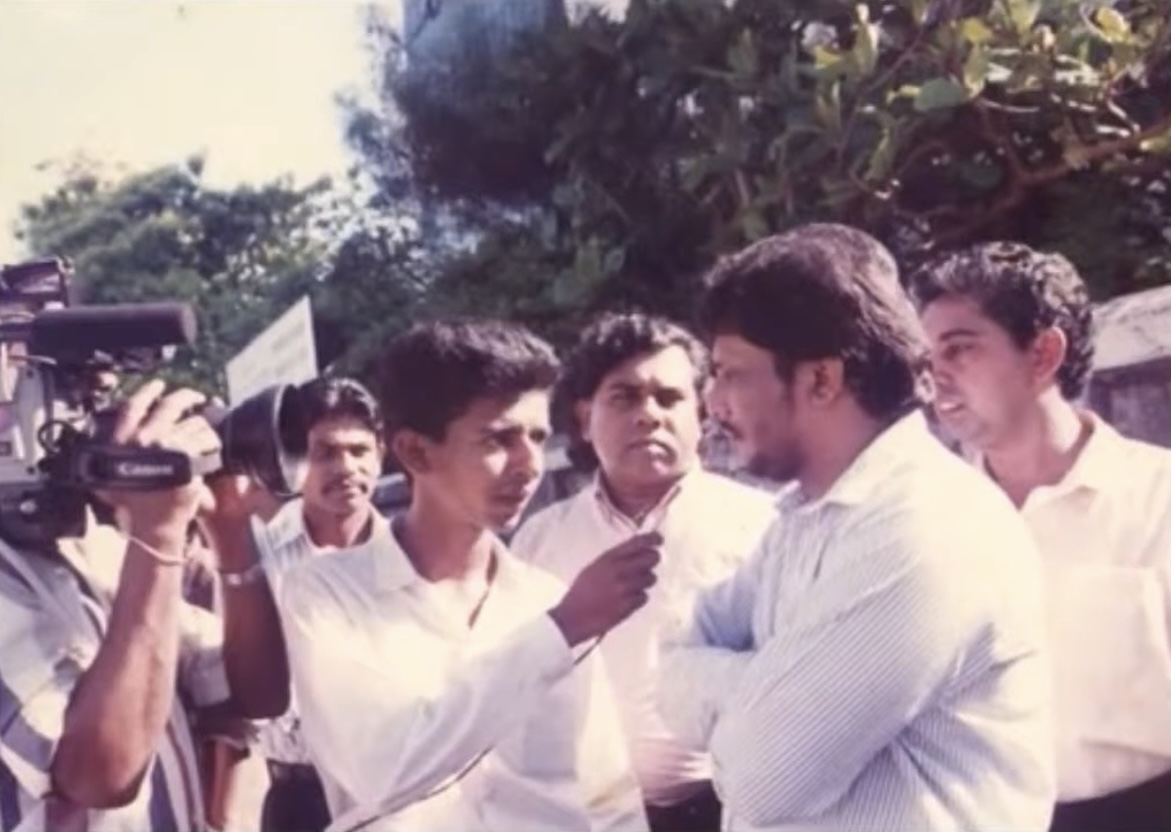
Lasantha Wickrematunge c.1995

In 1994 Wickrematunge started the Sunday Leader with his brother Lal Wickrematunge. In addition to Sunday Leader, Wickrematunge was the Editorial Board Director for the Sinhalese Sunday newspaper Iruresa (launched 2004) and the Wednesday English paper Morning Leader (launched 2005). All three were severely critical towards the government. He reported critically on both the government and the Tamil Tiger (LTTE) rebels, and the Leader soon became "well known as the island's best independent newspaper". He later stated that once the paper was started, he had intended to return to law, but found himself unwilling to give up journalism's excitement. He was also a writer for Time magazine at this time and was a political commentator while he hosted his broadcast programs including Good Morning Sri Lanka.

At the height of his career Wickrematunge was feared by senior ministers and the most powerful in the nation and political leaders on both sides at various times sought to persuade Wickrematunge into accepting political positions by offering him ministries of his choice. The paper quickly drew threats and attacks for its reporting on corruption by government ministers.

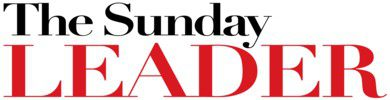

From 1994-2005, Wickrematunge was an ardent critic of the Chandrika Kumaratunga government. In 2000, Wickrematunge conducted an investigation into Kumartunga's education qualifications. Kumaratunga's curriculum vitae had stated that she was an alumna of the Sorbonne University. Wickrematunge challenged Kumaratunga to release her documentations of certification and went on to publish a letter from the university that stated Kumaratunga was never registered as a student. In May 2000, the government of Kumaratunga closed down the Sunday Leader after military setbacks in the war against LTTE in the north of the country. Wickrematunge filed a fundamental rights application with the Supreme Court, fought the closure and secured a court victory striking down the law allowing government to curb the fourth estate. In 2006, after Kumaratunga was ousted as President, she went on to form a friendship with Wickrematunge.

In the final stages of the civil war, Wickrematunge was a key figure in the human rights movement. Wickrematunge was known for his trademark phrase "unbowed and unafraid" inspired from the Invictus poem by William Ernest Henley which he used as his motto and philosophy. Wickrematunge was vocal about his frustrations by the issues faced by vulnerable populations and expressed his agitation against state terrorism. In addition to his contributions to marginalized communities, Wickrematunge actively spoke out against Sri Lanka's poverty and economic inequality. Wickrematunge largely impacted his Tamil audience who felt he supported and articulated their issues.

The Leader was particularly critical in its coverage of President Mahinda Rajapaksa. In 2008, Mahinda Rajapaksa, furious over the paper's reporting, called Wickrematunge and shouted at him that "I will destroy you" if the paper's coverage did not change; the president had also described him as a "terrorist journalist".

In the weeks before Wickrematunge's death, a funeral wreath was delivered to him, as well as a copy of the newspaper reading "If you write you will be killed" in red paint. Wickrematunge was quoted as saying "The word fear is not in my vocabulary." Not wanting to endanger anyone else, Wickrematunge continuously refused to hire a bodyguard.

After the assassination of Wickrematunge, Leader Publications was sold over to a Rajapaksa associate and an unconditional apology was made to Gotabaya Rajapaksa for publishing a series of reports suggesting that he had made corrupt arms deals.

=== Broadcasting ===
During the early 1990s Wickrematunge hosted several popular broadcast television talk shows. Wickrematunge worked for TNL TV where he hosted his own nightly political debating segment. Several years in to his political programs with TNL, Wickrematunge was asked by MTV Channel (owned by the Maharajah Group) to host Good Morning Sri Lanka which he hosted till 2007.

=== Suranimala ===
In the late eighties, Lasantha Wickrematunge while working for Sirimavo Bandaranaike started a whistleblower column in The Sunday Times (Sri Lanka) using the pseudonym "Suranimala".

Wickrematunge concealed his identity as Suranimala and soon it became the most widely read political column in any newspaper in Sri Lanka for its explosive, investigative revelations and Suranimala quickly became a thorn in the flesh of the Ranasinghe Premadasa government. Suranimala wrote on issues that were current and was known for his ability to publicize content and documents beyond the control of the government and for publishing intimate details such as what the president was served for dinner. On one occasion, he wrote of President Premadasa's proposals on devolution which had been submitted confidentially. In Wickrematunge's investigation's he had uncovered that "President Premadasa used four different colours of ink" to trace for leaks. Suranimala intentionally mentioned the colour of the ink used in the file copy which led to a crisis in the Presidential Secretariat.

At its inception there was a lot of intrigue in Sri Lanka of the identity of Suranamila. Both Wickrematunge as well as his editor therefore maintained confidentiality.

Wickrematunge took Suranimala with him when he started The Sunday Leader in 1994.

== State surveillance and political coercion ==
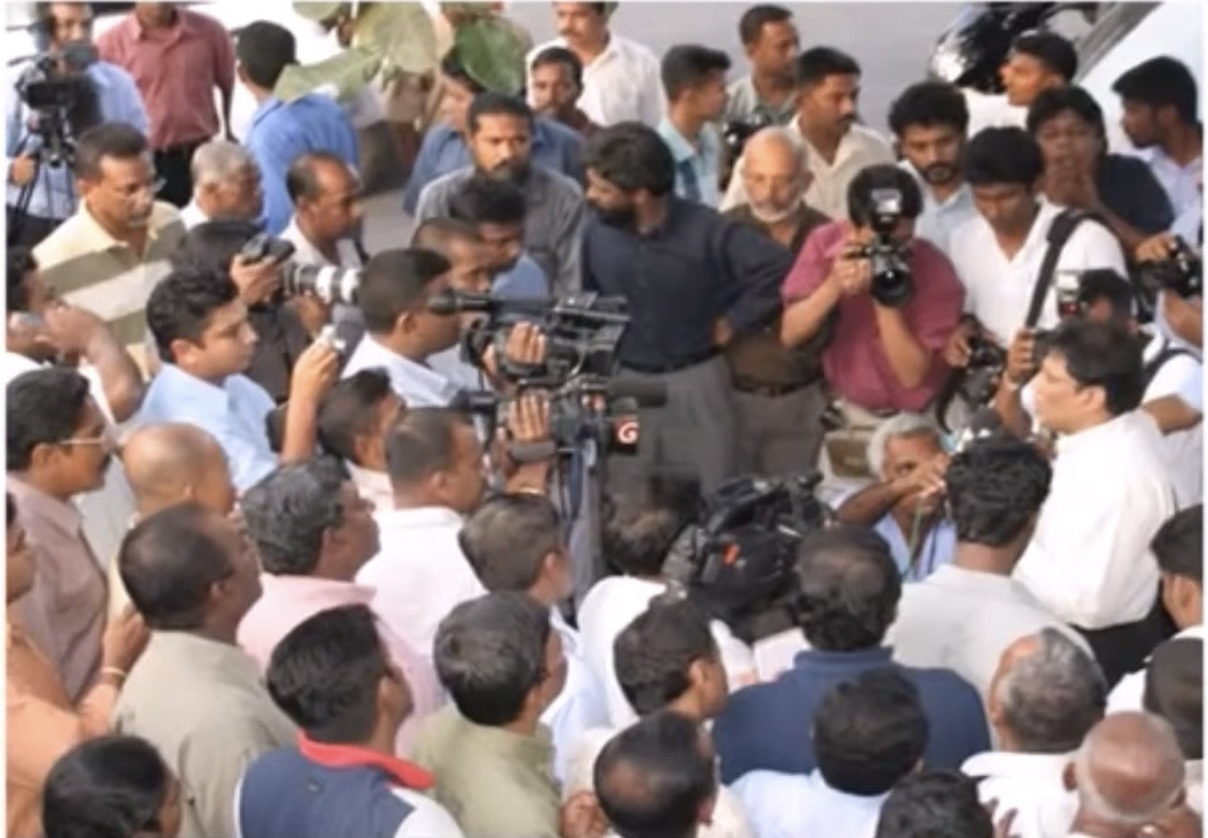
Lasantha Wickrematunge addresses media before attempted arrest in 2006

During the Rajapaksa regime and the final stages of the Sri Lankan Civil War, Wickrematunge was the country's leading critic of the government and war effort and was the target of ongoing political persecution. Wickrematunge was subjected to government sponsored media scrutiny and campaigns depicting him as a "traitor". Wickrematunge condemned and spoke out against the treatment and oppression of the Sri Lankan Tamils and opposed Gotabaya Rajapaksa's war strategies and continually called for a diplomatic solution to the conflict.

Wickrematunge investigated corrupt military procurement deals and spoke out strongly for a negotiated settlement to the ethnic conflict and continued to debunk what he saw as "government propaganda" on the war. Wickrematunge exposed governmental waste, corruption and excess. Wickrematunge felt that while it was important to eliminate the Liberation Tigers of Tamil Eelam it was important also to respect the lives and rights of Tamil civilians. Wickrematunge was one of the country's only leading figures to speak out against the Sri Lankan government during the time of war and began to be viewed as "the single biggest stumbling block to all out massacre in the north".

=== State intelligence surveillance ===
Throughout the course of his career, Wickrematunge was under frequent surveillance by the Sri Lankan government's intelligence and was subject to phone tapping and regularly being trailed. Speaking to a media outlet, Wickrematunge said, "I consider these incidents an occupational hazard. They only strengthen my resolve to continue with my work". In 2008 Wickrematunge's name was added to a "Traitor list" that was published on the Defense Ministry's official website and State Intelligence Service (Sri Lanka) began surveilling Wickrematunge's phone lines. Intelligence Service documents leaked to media outlets alleged that Gotabaya Rajapaksa ordered the tapping of phones including that of several high-ranking politicians in the opposition and the phone of Wickrematunge on the basis of "National Security".

=== Allegations of espionage ===
Allegations that Wickrematunge had worked as an espionage agent for Indian intelligence outfit the Research & Analysis Wing, circulated after it was reported that Wickrematunge had been seen meeting a diplomat attached to the Indian High Commission in Colombo at 1:00 in the morning where he had been followed by Sri Lanka's intelligence services. The claim alleged Wickrematunge was followed and seen entering the home of a foreign agent after his meeting with then president Mahinda Rajapaksa. The government had suspected Wickrematunge of revealing information disclosed to him by the president to intelligence agents of a foreign government from this visit. The indications of Wickrematunge working as an espionage were however unsubstantiated and there has never been any evidence presented that supported the allegation and Wickrematunge's close coterie of friends and colleagues have denied this claim.

=== Timeline of attacks ===
In November 1982, Wickrematunge's friendship with Vijaya Kumaratunga led to the Criminal Investigation Department interrogating him for possible Naxalite connections. During the J. R. Jayewardene Government, several political activists who had supported the opposition candidate during the election were arrested and detained under various charges. Kumaratunga who had played a leading role in the election supporting Presidential candidate Hector Kobbekaduwa, was wrongfully arrested on false charges and on conspiracy of being a Naxalite and kept in solitary confinement for a period of three months in prison. Wickrematunge who was working at the Sun newspaper as a sub editor, was brought in for questioning by the Criminal Investigation Department over his close ties with Kumaratunga. During interrogation, Wickrematunge was accused of being a Naxalite based on his relationship with Kumaratunga. The interrogation led Wickrematunge to quit his job at the Sun newspaper.

On 7 February 1995, masked assailants pulled Wickrematunge and his first wife Raine out of their car and attacked them with clubs. Wickrematunge's wife jumped over his body as he was being assaulted to protect him and they were both injured in the attack. Raine later stated that the death threats became part of the routine of their lives: "There were so many threatening calls. 'We are going to kill you. We are going to kill your children.'" In 2002, Wickrematunge's then wife left Sri Lanka due to the constant threats against their family, taking their three children to Australia. Years later after the assault, when the hit men who were subsequently apprehended, Wickrematunge asserted that both he and his wife did not wish for the assailants to be punished and asked his lawyer to drop any charges. However Wickrematunge's lawyers had advised him against it because they told him it would be setting a bad precedent.

In June 1998, Wickrematunge began to notice that his home was under surveillance. Wickrematunge reported that a white van with tinted windows was regularly parked outside his family residence. On the night of 17 June 1998, after returning from dinner with his wife and children, Anti-tank bullets were fired at Wickrematunge's residence while his family were inside their home. Many local and international organisations including the committee to protect journalists, condemned the incident calling it an "attack on free media". Members of the media and many United National Party members and parliamentarians including then Opposition Leader Ranil Wickremasinghe, visited Wickrematunge's home to stand in solidarity with him. Mangala Samaraweera, addressing the weekly cabinet press briefing, condemned the shooting on Wickrematunge's home. A total of 40 spent T56 anti-tank cartridges were also found outside the residence. Wickrematunge said that receiving threats was not unusual for him, and that such threats would come in often times during his TV programme telecast on TNL TV which he hosted.

On 5 September 2000, Lasantha Wickrematunge was found guilty of criminally defaming Sri Lankan President Chandrika Kumaratunga in a 1995 article in The Sunday Leader. Wickrematunge was sentenced to two years in jail, suspended for five years.

In January 2005, Wickrematunge exposed the ‘Helping Hambantota’ scandal in The Sunday Leader. The relationship between Wickrematunge and Mahinda Rajapaksa was strained.

Wickrematunge was threatened by President Mahinda Rajapaksa with whom he had a close personal friendship with for over 20 years. Wickrematunge was allegedly abused in foul language in a telephone call on 11 January 2006. According to Wickrematunge, the President had threatened to "destroy him" over a publication in his newspaper involving then First Lady Shiranthi Rajapaksa. Wickrematunge was detained briefly at Bandaranaike International Airport on 21 February 2006 as he arrived for a flight to Geneva. Airport officials had claimed that Wickrematunge required "special permission" to leave Sri Lanka.

In December 2006, an unsuccessful attempt was made to arrest Wickrematunge for "Endangering National Security" after he published a report exposing a Rs. 500 million luxury bunker to be built in the presidential complex in his newspaper. Criminal Investigation Department personnel had consulted Sri Lanka's then Attorney General, on the possibility of detaining Wickrematunge under Emergency Regulations. Wickrematunge addressed the media and a large gathering of supporters outside the premises of The Sunday Leader and stated that he will not seek safe passage overseas and will face arrest and all political oppression levelled against him and "stand unbowed and unafraid". Due to the public outcry and pressure on the Government by the country's Opposition Party and local and international Human Rights organisations, an arrest was not made.

The printing press of Leader Publications was destroyed in 2007 by an armed gang who stormed the building on the outskirts of Colombo and set the printing press machines on fire. At least 12 masked men carrying T-56 automatic weapons threatened the staff at the building and set it on fire.

In 2008, Rajapaksa asked his physician Eliyantha White to speak to Wickrematunge in hopes of a reconciliation. In October 2008, Mahinda Rajapaksa called Wickrematunge a "terrorist journalist" in an interview. Rajapaksa made these comments to Reporters Without Borders.

On 6 January 2009 just two days before Wickrematunge's assassination, armed assailants broke into the Sirasa television studio complex and destroyed equipment. Wickrematunge arrived at the location with other UNP politicians to condemn the attacks. Wickrematunge made his last public appearance and statement as he condemned the attack on Sirasa and called it an "act of terrorism".

=== Relationship with Mahinda Rajapaksa ===
Wickrematunge and Mahinda Rajapaksa first met in the early eighties. During the presidency of Chandrika Kumaratunga, Rajapaksa was a minister of the Kumaratunga government. Wickrematunge would meet with Rajapaksa in secret, late at night and in the early hours of the morning when he knew he would not be followed. Wickrematunge and Rajapaksa would have several intimate meetings weekly. Rajapaksa claimed that Wickrematunge was "one of his very good friends" and that they met often, usually around "midnight". President Kumaratunga who later became aware of these meetings referred to Rajapaksa as a "Reporter for Wickrematunge" and alleged that he leaked many government and cabinet secrets to him.

When Rajapaksa was declared as Leader of the Opposition in Parliament on 6 February 2002 following the appointment of Ranil Wickremasinghe as prime minister, Wickrematunge welcomed him warmly. Rajapaksa, climbed the rungs of the Sri Lanka Freedom Party with struggle, and had to work hard to draw support from the party's grassroots level. Wickrematunge was among those who helped Rajapaksa come up in to power during this difficult phase in his political career.

After Wickrematunge's assassination in 2009, an ally of Rajapaksa said that "It was Lasantha, and Maithripala Sirisena who worked hard to make him Prime Minister in 2004, when President Kumaratunga tried to give it to Lakshman Kadirgamar."

In late 2004, Basil Rajapaksa had approached Wickrematunge to join and help him run the 2005 Sri Lankan presidential election campaign for Rajapaksa which Wickrematunge declined.

In January 2005, Wickrematunge exposed the ‘Helping Hambantota’ scandal and his newspaper continued to cover the scandal for weeks after Wickrematunge investigated and unearthed evidence of Prime Minister Rajapaksa's alleged involvement in transferring over Rs. 80 million of the 2004 Indian Ocean earthquake and tsunami relief funds into a private bank account. Wickrematunge's investigation resulted in the Criminal Investigation Department (Sri Lanka) inquiry being brought to a standstill by Chief Justice Sarath Silva, who made an apology to the citizen's of Sri Lanka for ordering the halt of the investigation and allowing Rajapaksa to be elected as president. Relation's between Rajapaksa and Wickrematunge were affected.

After Rajapaksa was elected president in November of that year, the hostility between Wickrematunge and Rajapaksa increased after the President was wrongly informed by a diplomat that "The Sunday Leader was most likely to be the newspaper that would carry a story regarding an alleged visit by the President and his wife to a Hindu temple in India". Wickrematunge filed a police complaint against Rajapaksa and published Rajapaksa's threats to him. Rajapaksa and Wickrematunge were from then on sworn enemies and Leader Publications continued week after week to splash investigative stories of alleged corruption in Rajapaksa's government.

In 2008, Rajapaksa desired to reconcile with Wickrematunge and requested his physician Lindsay Eliyantha White to help bring both Wickrematunge and himself back together again. The two had then met and spoken. It was also stated at this time that both Wickrematunge and President Rajapaksa had discussed coming together after the war in order to work towards "national unity".

After Wickrematunge's assassination, a political figure connected to both President Rajapaksa and Wickrematunge stated that "President Rajapaksa was deeply stunned and affected by the death of Wickrematunge for several days and still displays a unique discomfort when discussing him".

=== Legal dispute with Gotabaya Rajapaksa ===
In August 2007, The Sunday Leader reported on a military contract involving the purchase of Mikoyan MiG-27 Ukrainian fighter aircraft between Gotabaya Rajapaksa, his cousin Udayanga Weeratunga and the Sri Lanka Air Force. On 18 October 2007, attorney-at-law Ali Sabry and lawyers representing Rajapaksa wrote to Wickrematunge threatening to sue him for defamation for LKR2 billion (€14 million) in damages. On 22 February 2008, Rajapaksa filed a lawsuit for defamation against Wickrematunge and Leader Publications, charging that the allegations made by Wickrematunge against Rajapaksa were defamatory. Rajapaksa asserted that his role of Defense Secretary "had been adversely affected due to Wickrematunge, creating adverse consequences to the war against the rebels in the battlefield."

On 5 December 2008, a judge ordered Leader Publications not to publish any reports about Gotabaya Rajapaksa, for two weeks. Several weeks later, Wickrematunge was assassinated days before he was to testify and give evidence in court.

== Assassination ==
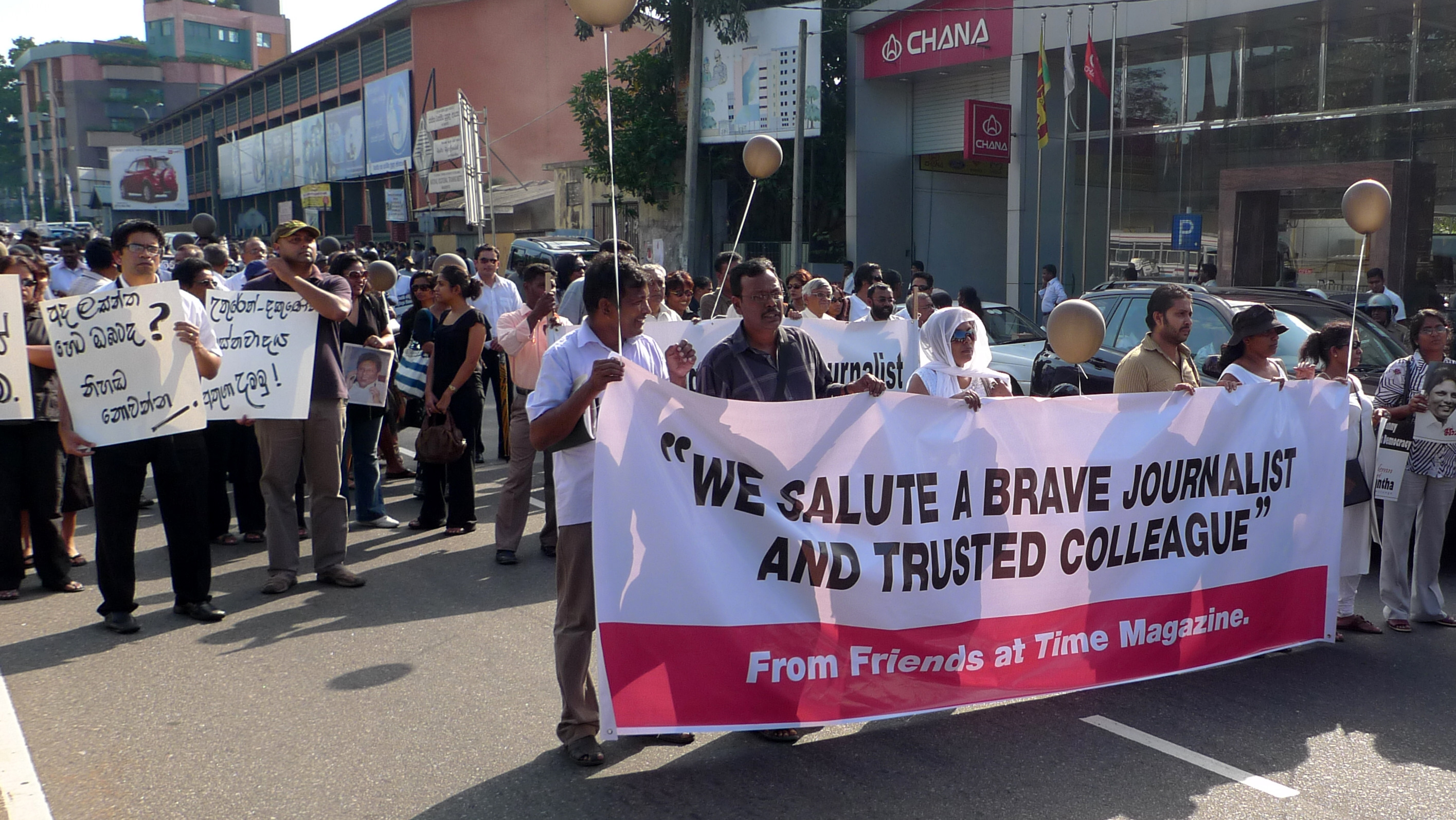
Journalists from Time display a banner during the funeral procession of Lasantha Wickrematunge, January 2009.

Wickrematunge was shot while he was on his way to work around 10:30 a.m on 8 January 2009, a few days before he was supposed to give evidence against Gotabaya Rajapaksa's alleged corruption in arms deals before a judge. Four armed assassins riding motorcycles blocked Wickrematunge's vehicle before breaking open his window and shooting him. He was taken to the Colombo South Teaching Hospital. It was initially planned with a helicopter on standby to transfer him to the Colombo National Hospital. A specialist team of 20 medical personnel were called in for the surgery. Despite surgery lasting nearly three hours, Wickrematunge died from his head wounds.

=== Reaction ===
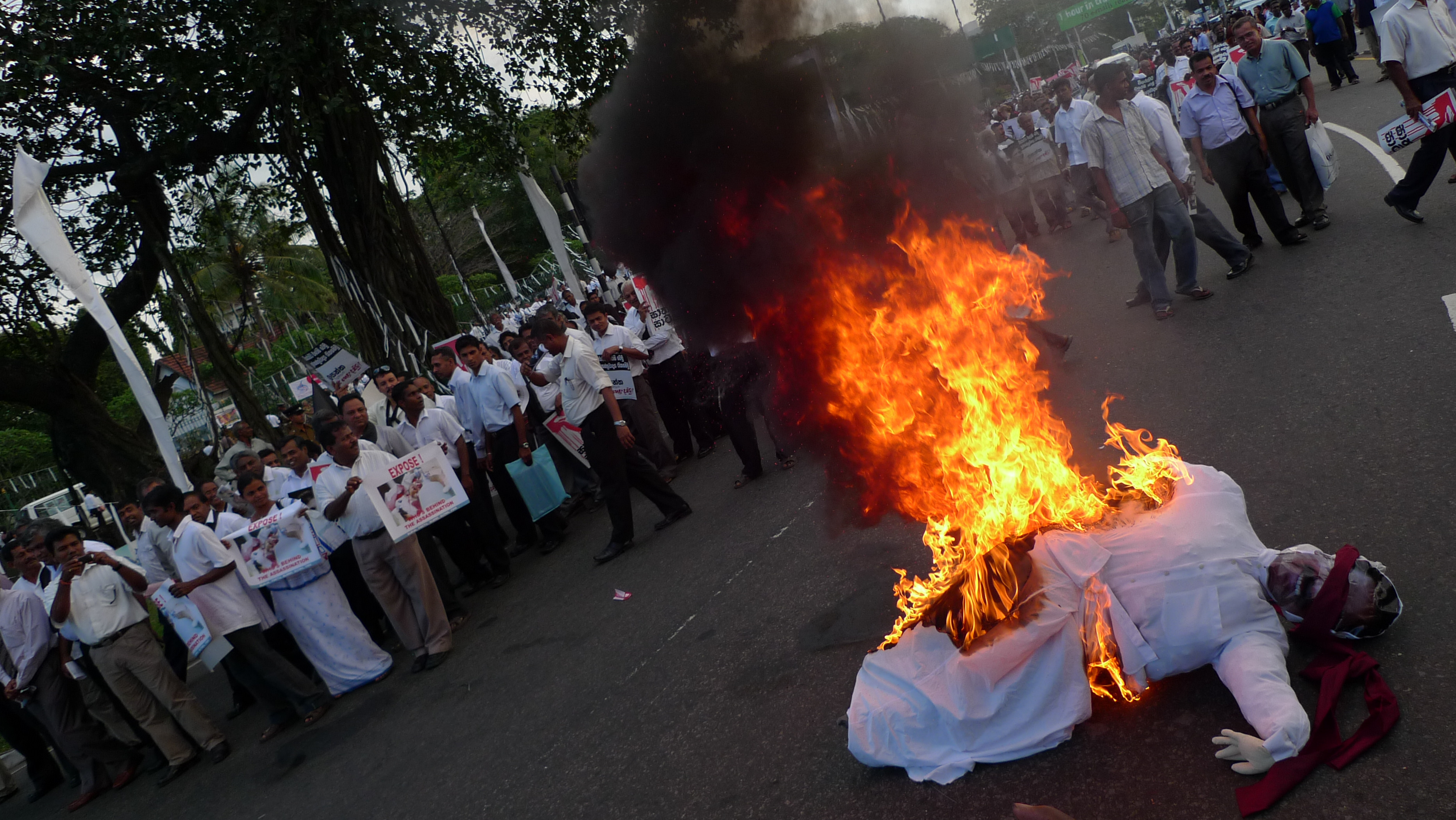
Supporters at the funeral of Lasantha Wickrematunge burn an effigy of the Sri Lankan President, Mahinda Rajapaksa

Wickrematunge's assassination caused an international outcry. Reporters Without Borders said that "Sri Lanka has lost its more talented, courageous, and iconoclastic journalists", and said that "President Mahinda Rajapaksa, his associates and the government media are directly to blame because they incited hatred against him and allowed an outrageous level of impunity to develop as regards violence against the press". President Mahinda Rajapaksa described the assassination as an attempt to discredit the government and said he was both grieved and shocked and stated that he had instructed a thorough police inquiry and called the assassination an "International Conspiracy".

The Opposition Leader Ranil Wickremesinghe observed that it was part of an anti-democratic conspiracy and accused the government of attempting to silence its critics. On 9 January, Wickremesinghe stated in Parliament that elements of the state intelligence apparatus were responsible for Wickrematunge's murder, claiming that the military units that carried out the assassination were effectively not under the control of the Cabinet. Wickremasinghe went on to say that military forces members were shocked and felt the reputation of the country was being ruined by the assassination of Wickrematunge. The United National Party, Sri Lanka's main opposition party, staged a demonstration in parliament on 9 January to protest his assassination and Mangala Samaraweera called Wickrematunge's murder an "insoluble bloodstain in our national history" and apologized to Sri Lanka for "bringing this dark regime into power," The assassination was condemned by Norway, the United States, the United Kingdom, the European Union, India and Japan, the United Nations strongly condemned the assassination while the World Bank expressed its concerns over the attack. President Mahinda Rajapaksa told Time about Wickrematunge: "He was a good friend of mine. He had informed somebody to inform me that he was in danger. But unfortunately, I didn't get that message. I would have told him to go to the nearest police station. No one knows what happened."

Lord Malloch-Brown Minister of State at the Foreign and Commonwealth Office, said in a statement to the UK Parliament that the British government condemned the killing of Wickrematunge and said that it was the duty of the authorities to take prompt action into these incidents:

We condemn such brazen attacks. Of particular concern was the murder, on 8 January, of the Chief Editor of The Sunday Leader newspaper, Lasantha Wickrematunge. The Sri Lankan authorities have a duty to take prompt action to ensure that a thorough and independent investigation is carried out.

Sri Lankan church leaders voiced their concerns over the attack and the ethnic violence in the Island nation. Anglican Bishop Duleep de Chickera of Colombo said in a statement, "The assassination of Lasantha Wickrematunge, in broad daylight on a public road, has sent shock waves of anger, fear and desperation through the country. This deliberate and senseless act ... is part of a wider and worsening strategy to suppress and silence the media."

In a statement ahead of World Press Freedom Day former United Nations Secretary-General Ban Ki-moon called on the government of Sri Lanka to ensure that those responsible for Lasantha Wickrematunge's murder are found and prosecuted.

=== Investigation ===
After denying all responsibility for the attack the Rajapaksa government called for an investigation. Despite intense media pressure, no one was arrested, and Sri Lankan media speculated that the murder investigation may "end up as a cover-up", and that safeguards for an independent media appeared bleak.

In January 2010, the Criminal investigation department identified a member of the Tripoli platoon as a suspect. The Tripoli platoon is a Sri Lankan army platoon that was being accused of several crimes during the time of Gotabaya Rajapaksa's term as defense secretary. Inspector General of Police ordered the Criminal investigations department to halt the investigation and transfer the case to the Terrorist investigation division.

In February 2010, The Terrorist investigation division arrested 17 military intelligence officers on suspicion of Wickrematunge's assassination. All 17 suspects were released without charges and the terrorist investigation division took into custody one member of the Tripoli platoon who was released shortly afterwards without being charged.

Soon after Wickrematunge's murder, police searched for his cell phone but did not recover it from his possessions as it had been reported as stolen. In November 2010, police recovered the phone and a suspect was in remand prison for over a year for having Wickrematunge's phone in his possession.

Ranil Wickremesinghe, accused Sarath Fonseka, the former army commander, of the murder of Lasantha Wickrematunge in 2008 and 2009. In 2011, the former MP Rajiva Wijesinha told BBC Sinhala Service that the British High Commission in Colombo had told him it possessed evidence that former military chief Gen Sarath Fonseka was involved in the assassination Lasantha Wickremetunge. According to Sarath Fonseka the order for the assassination was given by Gotabaya

On 26 February 2010, Pitchai Jesudasan, a garage mechanic from Nuwara Eliya was arrested and remanded on the charges that it was his National Identity Card that was used to obtain multiple SIM cards used by the Army Intelligence to communicate with each other in Wickrematunge's murder. Evidence of Jesudasan led to the arrest of Kandegedara Piyawansa an Army Intelligence officer who had been accused of having imbibed the mechanic with alcohol to steal his ID card. Both suspects were in remand custody when Jesudasan died mysteriously inside the prison on 13 October 2011 and Piyawansa was set free to resume work in his previous unit.

After Mahinda Rajapaksa's defeat at the presidential election in 2015, the new government of President Maithripala Sirisena reopened the investigation over allegations that former Defense Secretary Gotabhaya Rajapaksa ordered the assassination.

After the elections, Rajapaska requested his departure to be postponed claiming an urgent matter regarding national security. Investigations on assassinations, abductions and assaults on journalist after the fall of the Rajapaksa government revealed that Gotabaya directed a death squad to attack journalists that was outside the Army command structure during this time 17 journalists and media workers were killed and others were either assaulted or abducted.

In July 2016, it was revealed by investigators that Dias, who worked as a Chauffeur for Wickrematunge had been blindfolded and abducted by an Army Intelligence officer. Dias, told investigators he was often intoxicated and had been openly alleging that Gotabaya Rajapaksa was behind the assassination of his boss.

Dias was traced and questioned by police. He agreed to identify the person who abducted him in a lineup. Dias told the Criminal Investigation Department (Sri Lanka) that the assailant "looked just like his Uncle". After working with a sketch artist, a key suspect was traced and soon identified by Dias.

On 17 February 2016, The Criminal investigations department released composite sketches of two suspects who they believed to have carried out the murder to the public.

In 2016, Criminal investigations department reported that two Tamil youth were killed to cover up Wickrematunge's murder. On 27 January 2009, the Mt Lavinia police had reported they recovered two motorcycles from among bushes on the banks of the Attidiya canal which was reported to have been used in Wickrematunge's murder operation. In 2016, Parents of two Tamil men who had gone missing from the North of Sri Lanka had been desperately searching for their sons for some time. The two young men named Balraj Ram Prakash and Kumarasingham Vishnukumar had been seen by eye witnesses being stopped by Sri Lanka's security forces in Vavuniya while they were travelling to Chettikulam before they were allegedly blind folded and abducted. On 10 October 2016, the Criminal investigations department got the family members of the Tamil youths to identify their remains using pictures of the charred bodies which DNA tests proved were of the two men. Their bodies were found in an area in Anuradhapura.

=== Exhumation ===
On 27 September 2016, an Exhumation of Wickrematunge's remains took place under a court order, after police investigators sought permission for a new examination due to contradictory medical and post mortem examination reports. Wickrematunge's grave in Colombo was under armed guard after a new autopsy request was announced earlier in the month, two months after a Military Intelligence official was arrested in connection with the killing of Wickrematunge. The officer who carried out the autopsy reported that the death occurred due to gunshot wounds while the surgeon said the wounds were not from bullet.

=== Further investigation (2016–present) ===
In October 2016, a retired intelligence officer committed suicide and left a note claiming he is the killer of Wickrematunge and that the intelligence officers that were arrested and under investigation were innocent. The intelligence officer's family reported to Police that they did not believe the officer's death was a suicide.

In December 2016, Investigators travelled to Australia to interview and record statements from Wickrematunge's family. The Criminal Investigation Department presented facts pertaining to Wickrematunge's assassination to the Mount Lavinia Magistrate's court. According to court documents filed, Wickrematunge's daughter told investigators her father warned her he would be killed because of his investigations into the MiG deal.

In February 2018, former Deputy inspector general of police Prassana Nanayakkara was arrested under suspicions of concealing evidence over Wickrematunge's murder.

In November, during the 2018 Sri Lankan constitutional crisis, Nishantha Silva one of the lead investigators in Wickrematunge's case was transferred from the Criminal Investigation Department to the Negombo Police division on a service requirement. Wickrematunge's daughter Ahimsa Wickrematunge, condemned the move to transfer Silva in an open letter addressed to President Maithripala Sirisena. The Transfer was stopped upon Wickrematunge's daughters letter.

On 14 August 2019, Wickrematunge's daughter accused Ranil Wickremesinghe of using her father's name to win votes during the election and failing to do enough to prosecute Wickrematunge's killers and accused Wickremesinghe of protecting Gotabaya Rajapaksa in an open letter.

After the 2019 Sri Lankan presidential election, Nishantha Silva left Sri Lanka reportedly seeking asylum in Switzerland after Gotabaya Rajapaksa was elected as president. In July 2020, Shani Abeysekara former senior superintendent of police who headed the Criminal Investigation Department and was leading the investigation into Wickrematunge's death was arrested by the Colombo Crimes Division. His family stated they believed he was being targeted for exposing human rights abuses implicating top politicians. Abeysekara was released on bail in June 2021.

In January 2020, Gotabaya Rajapaksa appointed a commission on political victimisation to exonerate officials implicated in Wickrematunge's murder.

In June 2020, Wickrematunge's daughter appealed to the National police commission to block the appointment of Prassana Alwis as director of the Criminal investigations department claiming that the department had caught him tampering with important evidence.

In July 2020, Criminal investigations department brought a news editor into questioning over a 2017 news report covered on Wickrematunge's murder demanding the editor reveal his sources.

In June 2021, Abeysekara wrote to the Sri Lankan Inspector General of Police and the Human Rights Commission of Sri Lanka, requesting protection because he was facing consistent threats of assassination and physical harm due to the work and investigations he carried out.

=== Hague people's tribunal trial ===
On 12 May 2022, The People's Tribunal in the Hague held a trial producing facts and testimonies in the unsolved assassination of Wickrematunge and two other journalists from Syria and Mexico. The tribunal opined that the Sri Lankan Government as well the governments of Mexico and Syria had also violated a number of other conventions, treaties and other international, regional and national legal instruments which they had undertaken to uphold. The Peoples tribunal at the Hague announcing its verdict indicted the Sri Lankan Government of human rights violation allegations against the murder of Wickrematunge.

=== U.S lawsuit ===
In April 2019, Wickrematunge's daughter Ahimsa Wickrematunge filed a civil lawsuit against Gotabaya Rajapaksa in the state of California. Wickrematunge's daughter's lawsuit alleged that Rajapaksa was behind his death. Rajapaksa, who was visiting the U.S. to renounce his citizenship, was served legal documents outside a Trader Joe's parking lot in Pasadena.

Rajapaksa arrived back to Sri Lanka from the United States and was greeted by his supporters and members of the Buddhist Clergy who came to the Bandaranaike International Airport to stand in solidarity with Rajapaksa. Due to the case filed against him, Rajapaksa's ability to renounce his citizenship was stalled. Rajapaksa alleged that the case filed against him by Wickrematunge's daughter was "politically motivated" by the United National Party to stop him from contesting the Presidential Election that year. Rajapaksa took to social media and shared a message later that day that said,

"Touched by the warm welcome. Greatly appreciate your love and support. No one can obstruct me from fulfilling my obligations to our beloved nation. Ready to serve my country again if and when duty calls."

=== United Nations case ===
On 8 January 2021, on the 12th anniversary of Wickrematunge's death, Wickrematunge's daughter filed a complaint with the United Nations's Human Rights Committee against the Government of Sri Lanka, seeking accountability for the regime's role in the extra judicial killing of her father. In the 29-page complaint, Ahimsa Wickrematunge appealed to the UN to observe the human rights state of affairs in Sri Lanka, particularly the treatment of its journalists, especially during the periodic review of the country at the UN Human Rights Council that year.

== Personal life ==
=== Marriage and family ===
Wickrematunge met his wife Raine Wickrematunge in 1981 when he started working at the Sun newspaper. Wickrematunge had been recruited to the subs news desk by his boss who had asked his wife-to-be, to train Wickrematunge and other new interns in the art of sub-editing. Soon after they began a relationship and married in the late 1980s and had three children, Avinash, Ahimsa and Aadesh. In 1994, Wickrematunge, his brother Lal, and wife started the Sunday Leader together. Wickrematunge's brother had worked for Multi-Packs, a company that printed Sinhala cartoon periodicals. Haris Hulugalle, the Chairman of Multi-Packs, had been considering starting a national, English language newspaper. In 2008, Wickrematunge and his wife divorced.

Wickrematunge married his second wife Sonali Samarasinghe less than two weeks before his assassination at the end of 2008. After Wickrematunge's death, Samarasinghe fled Sri Lanka and called herself an "editor in exile".

When the United National Party were elected back into power after the 2015 Sri Lankan presidential election, Samarasinghe was appointed by the government as Sri Lanka's ‘Minister Counsellor’ at the country's mission in the UN Headquarters, in New York, until 2019.

In his private life, Wickrematunge was a teetotaller.

=== Religion ===
Wickrematunge was a Christian. Themes of religion and spirituality appear in much of Wickrematunge's writing. He said: "As for me, it is with a clear conscience that I go to meet my Maker. I wish, when your time finally comes, you could do the same. I wish".

Wickrematunge's faith as a Christian was credited as being his main source of strength and inspiration. Friends and co-workers that were close to Wickrematunge described him as a devout Christian and said it was his faith that provided him solace.

== Legacy ==
=== Public image ===
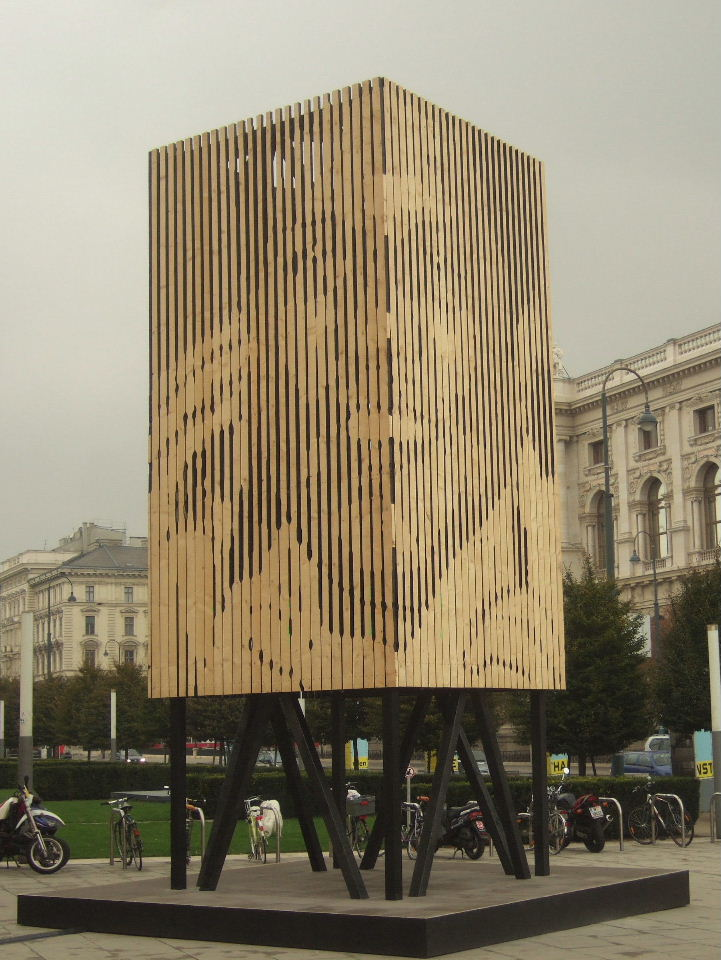
Monument of Lasantha Wickrematunge outside the Museum of Modern Art in Vienna.

Lasantha Wickrematunge won the hearts of the nation for his courage and commitment to Sri Lanka's advancement. During his career, Wickrematunge led the frontal resistance against the tyranny of successive regimes and many in authority feared his rise and controlling power in politics. Wickrematunge's legacy has had a significant influence on the media and the political and human rights movement in Sri Lanka and was regarded as a giant in the media landscape. Wickrematunge used his influence to propose and mainstream an alternative media narrative unpopular with those in power but a vivid reflection of the times. Internationally, Wickrematunge is an icon to practitioners of freedom of the press and an inspiration to journalists worldwide. Wickrematunge openly advocated parity, peace and a negotiated settlement to the ethnic strife. Wickrematunge's investigations led to hundreds of military intelligence officers, generals, businessmen, corporations, politicians and officials being exposed in corrupt deals in Sri Lanka. Wickrematunge regularly exposed atrocities for which security forces were suspected. He condemned the government as "perhaps the world's only administration to bomb its own people". To many, Wickrematunge was a symbol of the only true democratic opposition and his brand of journalism, propelled him to national eminence. A symbol of resistance against autocratic regimes, even after his assassination, Wickrematunge's death is a symbol in Sri Lanka today which continues to be used to drive the resistance against tyranny. To Sri Lankans, Wickrematunge was viewed as "a voice for the voiceless", "The backbone of the free media", "An outstanding member of the Fourth Estate". Throughout his career, he spoke out against the systematic ethnic cleansing in the north of the country and a prevalent culture of silence and paranoia. He editorialized and persistently exposed colossal tax evasions and kickbacks from defense deals and cabinet ministers "organizing fake travel documents for assassins and renegade rebel leaders" and kept the nation well informed on corruption and governmental malpractice. Everything publicized was backed by his incontrovertible investigated evidence. Wickrematunge championed and spoke out especially in favor of Tamil and Muslim minorities and the rights of the LGBT community in Sri Lanka and is lauded in the Tamil community for his consistent calls for equality and a non violent, peaceful resolution between the Tamil and Sinhalese people.

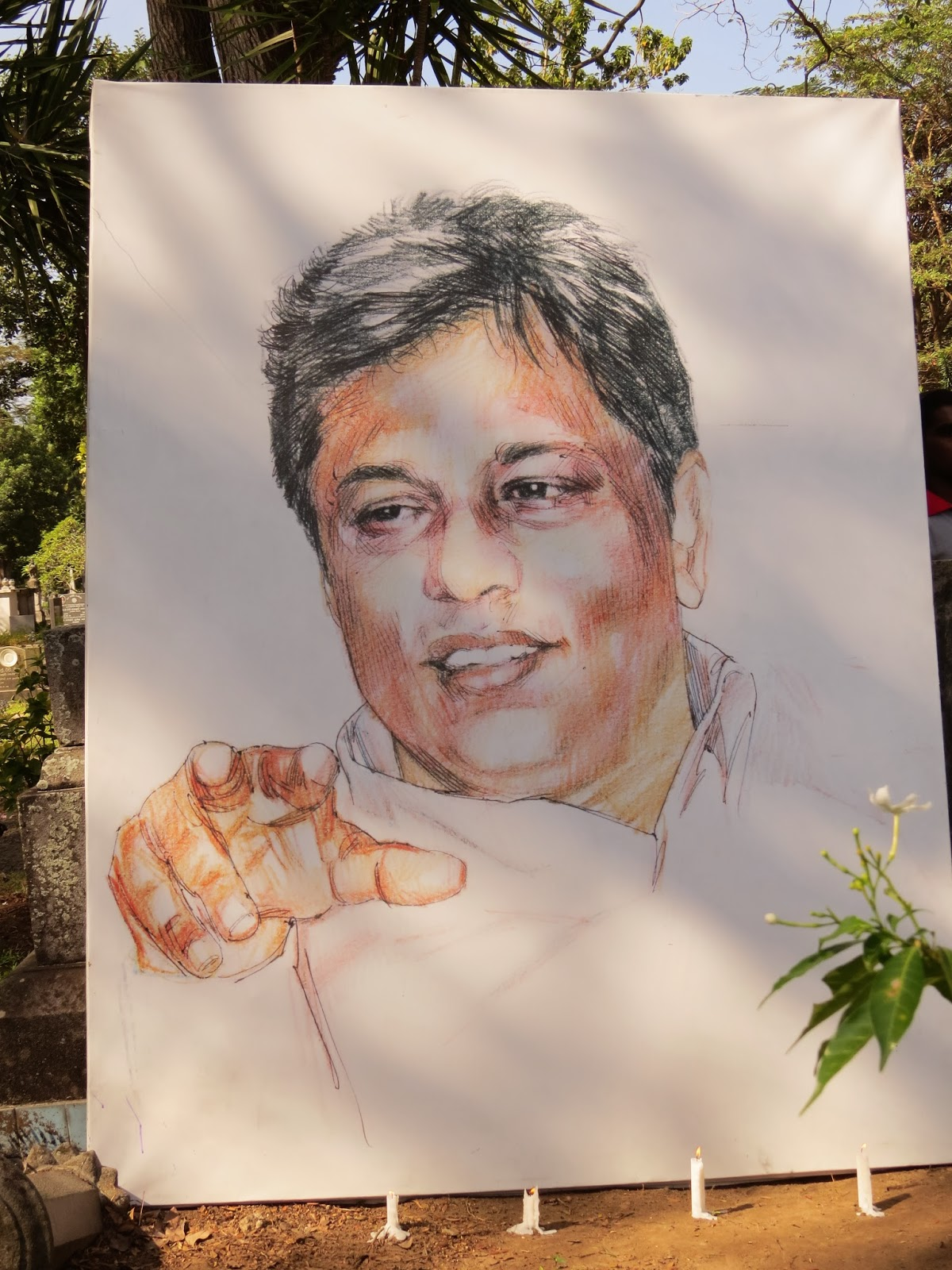
Portrait of Wickrematunge

=== Memorials ===
In 2009, a monument of Wickrematunge titled "Unbowed and Unafraid" by the sculptor Peter Sandbichler stood displayed outside the Museum of Modern Art in Vienna. In 2011 St Benedict's College the school of Wickrematunge, announced their Media Unit will be renamed as the ‘Lasantha Wickrematunge Media Unit,’ in memory of Wickrematunge and "loyal old Ben". In January 2019, Sajith Premadasa and the Ministry of Housing development announced the construction of a new village in honour of Wickrematunge. Lasantha Wickrematunge Anusmaranagama, the new village for Public Servants hosts 28 houses in honor of Wickrematunge.

During the 2022 Sri Lankan protests many protested to demand accountability and to bring justice for Wickrematunge. Banners and imagery depicting Wickrematunge and quotes by him were used and heavily featured during the protests.

== Influences, ideas and political views ==
=== Stance on Sri Lanka's civil war ===
Though Wickrematunge was from the majority Sinhalese he was vocal about his disdain for what he believed was prejudice of the minority Tamil citizens by the government during the civil war in Sri Lanka. Wickrematunge laid bare in his human rights advocacy the brutality of the 30-year civil war between the Sri Lankan government and the separatist Tamil Tigers. Wickrematunge espoused that while the LTTE had to be eradicated, it was more important to diplomatically address the root causes of terrorism and urge the government to view Sri Lanka's ethnic strife in the context of the country's history and not through the telescope of terrorism.

Wickrematunge was one of the most persistent and loudest critics of the Rajapaksa government and criticised the regime over the conduct of the war and lack of safety for its civilians trapped by the fighting. Wickrematunge saw the military's occupation of the country's north and east, as treating the Tamil people of those regions to live "eternally as second-class citizens". Wickrematunge predicted that development and reconstruction on the Tamil citizens in Sri Lanka's post-war era would not erase the scars of war and that Sri Lanka would eventually have an even more "bitter and hateful diaspora" to contend with.

Wickrematunge had a specific empathy for the Tamil plight. Throughout his career, Wickrematunge was known distinctively for being an advocate for social, ethnic and religious minorities. These standpoints were frequently reflected in his style of journalism and the general editorial drive of his newspaper. The Sunday Leader was valiantly critical of majoritarian hegemony and boldly supported the aspirations of the Tamil citizens.

As a human rights activist, Wickrematunge exposed many of the alleged human rights abuses that took place during the period of the civil war in Sri Lanka. Wickrematunge regarded that the Sri Lankan government were themselves resorting to terrorism by bombing LTTE targets from the air and viewing civilian hospitals in LTTE controlled zones as targets.

Wickrematunge believed in "advocating peace as a matter of justice" and believed in "hearing the voice of the underdog". Wickrematunge believed in the practice of standing for the kind of free and equal country he felt Sri Lanka should be. Wickrematunge's human rights activism defended ideals, and stood against what he viewed as "corrupt causes". He condemned both the LTTE and the military's occupation of the north and east of Sri Lanka in its final days of completion of the conflict.

Wickrematunge's advocacy on behalf of minorities labeled him as a traitor by the government.

"Government politicians and government websites had branded us traitors even as we uncovered corruption in government and graft in military procurements. Lasantha and I had always maintained that the LTTE (Tamil Tigers) were a ruthless, bloodthirsty terrorist organization that had assassinated countless leaders including India's Rajiv Gandhi and had systematically eliminated the political leadership of the Sri Lankan Tamils and wiped out the entire moderate Sinhala majority leadership. They had prevented Tamils from voting in elections and had committed indiscriminate violence against civilians. They had to be wiped out militarily. Lasantha's gand my grouse with the military solution was the colossal civilian cost. Any military conflict can be won if you use indiscriminate and unlimited violence against the other side. That is what happened in Hiroshima and Nagasaki. And that is also what happened in Sri Lanka. What Lasantha and I felt was that while it was important to eliminate the LTTE, it was important also to respect the lives of Tamil civilians." “I Will Destroy You, President Rajapakse.” Lanka Standard, 5 May 2011, www.lankastandard.com/2011/05/i-will-destroy-you-president-rajapakse/.

Wickrematunge openly stated that his concerns for the violations of the Tamil citizens should not hide his disdain for the LTTE. Wickrematunge asserted that if speaking out for the welfare of minorities labeled him as a "traitor" it was a label he wore proudly. Wickrematunge condemned the LTTE and stated that he believed them to be "among the most ruthless and bloodthirsty organisations ever to have infested the planet".

Before his assassination, Wickrematunge had predicted that he believed the military's potential victory over the region of Kilinochchi would be when he would likely be assassinated. Wickrematunge had told multiple friends, "when Kilinochchi falls, they will kill me." Wickrematunge explained that "the impact and consequences of killing him would be lessened in the war victory euphoria over Kilinochchi." Kilinochchi was captured six days before Wickrematunge's assassination on 2 January 2009.

=== Politics ===
Wickrematunge backed the United National Party and the party's policies. Wickrematunge's political work and journalism both served to make Wickrematunge a glaring threat and target for the Rajapaksa government. Wickrematunge's commitment and hope for Sri Lanka was to see the country be a transparent, secular, liberal democracy.

Wickrematunge voiced the need for equality and the urgency of the Sri Lankan people to live in peace and harmony during the country's conflict.

Wickrematunge described himself as an Idealist and was one of the country's few figures during his lifetime who spoke out and editorialized in support of gay rights and called for the decriminalisation of homosexuality in Sri Lanka. Wickrematunge spoke out for the rights of the Muslims, low-caste and the disabled in the country and would use his political standing to implement these views into action whilst in the thick of the policy-making and decision-making process of the United National Party.

During Wickrematunge's funeral, Ranil Wickremesinghe addressing the gathering on 12 January 2009 said, "Lasantha had to pay the high price with his life like all great leaders in the past who crusaded against corruption and malpractices, and who espoused the cause of democracy, freedom of the people and media rights".

=== Journalism style ===
By the time of his death, Wickrematunge was widely regarded as the finest journalist Sri Lanka had produced and the embodiment of journalistic values.

Wickrematunge's brand of journalism was at times regarded as controversial. Wickrematunge was viewed by his critics as being excessive in his anti-government criticism of excesses. He was respected as one of the first editors in Sri Lanka who gave importance to the coverage of humanitarian strife. Wickrematunge's style of writing was viewed by many as being shaped by his reaction and experiences to the war. He mirrored the "pain of a protracted conflict" and the lacking of space for dissent.

Wickrematunge's journalism style was uncovering what the powers that be wanted hidden. His brand of "fearless journalism" cast an exposing glare on the darkness of political and military power and uncovered to the public the corrupt secrets of those elected into government. He championed public-spirted journalism and sought to ensure the content was analytical, insightful, and humane.

Wickrematunge had many critics who were quick to condemn his methods of writing as "advocacy journalism". His investigations often obstructed abuse of power by political and military leaders. There were many supporters and an equal number of critics who felt that the Leader's brand of journalism was at times salacious. But the majority view within the journalist community was that Wickrematunge had brought something new and changed the scope of the Sri Lankan media.

== Honours and awards ==
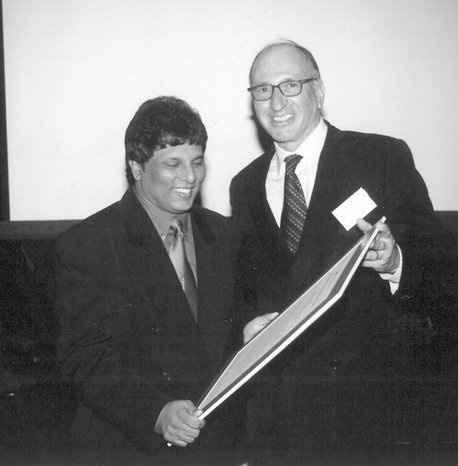
Lasantha Wickrematunge receiving the Transparency international award c.2000

In 2009, Wickrematunge was posthumously awarded the UNESCO/Guillermo Cano World Press Freedom Prize. He was also awarded the Louis Lyons Award for Conscience and Integrity in Journalism of Harvard University's Nieman Foundation the James Cameron Memorial Trust Award, and the American National Press Club's John Aubuchon Press Freedom Award. In 2010, Wickrematunge was declared a World Press Freedom Hero of the International Press Institute. In 2016 the East-West Center, Hawaii posthumously conferred the 2016 Courageous Journalism Award on Wickrematunge.

== Posthumous editorial ==
Wickrematunge predicted his own assassination and left a 2,500-word article to be printed in his paper when — not if — he was killed. The editorial was titled "And Then They Came For Me," with a reference to Martin Niemoller's famous Nazi-era poem First they came for. Foreseeing his own death and the responsibility of the state, Wickrematunge addressed president Mahinda Rajapaksa in the letter.

In "And then they came for me" which Wickrematunge had written shortly before his death, and that was to be published posthumously, he stated, "When finally I am killed, it will be the government that kills me." The Sunday Leader carried the posthumous editorial by Wickrematunge, in which he blamed the government directly for assassinating him and journalists in Sri Lanka as its "primary tool" for controlling the media. In the posthumous letter, Wickrematunge indicates the identity of those responsible for his murder from within the ranks of Sri Lanka's government, and lays out a detailed account of what he predicts in Sri Lanka's future and descent into persecution of its citizens.

== Bibliography ==
=== Books ===
- unbowed and unafraid Raine Wickrematunge
- Nar de dodar journalister Johan Mikaelsson
- To End a Civil War: Norway's Peace Engagement with Sri Lanka Mark Salter
- The Man Within My Head: Graham Greene, My Father and Me Pico Iyer'

== See also ==
- Notable assassinations of the Sri Lankan Civil War
