= T. V. Newton =

- Occupation: Police officer
- Status: In prison
- Conviction: Murder
- Criminal charges: Murder
- Penalty: Death

Thumbegedara Vittie Newton was a Sri Lankan police inspector, former OIC of the Angulana Police Station, who was sentenced to death for the murder of Dinesh Tharanga Fernando and Dhanushka Udayakantha Aponso.

== Murders ==
On the night of 12 August 2009 M. B. Dinesh Tharanga Fernando (22) and Dhanushka Udayakantha Aponso (26) were arrested by police officers from Angulana after a complaint from a woman. The two men were taken to Angulana police station where they were beaten and tortured by a number of police officers. The following day Fernando's body was found near a bridge one kilometre away and Aponso's body was found on the seashore. The post-mortem revealed that the two men had been shot several times.

Nine policemen were arrested - OIC T. V. Newton and police constables Galagamage Indrawansa Kumarasiri, Nihal Dhammika Jayaratne, Godapitiwatt Janapriya Senaratne, Gayan Chaturanga Thotawatte, Rohan Bandara Nawaratne, Anura Pradeep Kumara, Chamil Thushara Kulasinghe and Nissanka Dissanayake. The last five were released on the orders of the Attorney General.

== Case ==
Four policemen (OIC T. V. Newton, PC Galagamage Indrawansa Kumarasiri, PC Nihal Dhammika Jayaratne and PC Godapitiwatt Janapriya Senaratne) were charged with men's abduction and murder and tried at Colombo High Court. On 25 August 2011 all four policemen were found guilty of eight charges each - conspiring to abduct (x2); conspiring to murder and exposing the two men to danger (x2); abduction (x2); and murder (x2). All four policemen were sentenced to death for the murder and conspiring to murder. In addition, all four policemen were sentenced to 40 years rigorous imprisonment and fined of 100,000 rupees for the abduction and conspiring to abduct.
