= The Sunday Leader =

Sri Lankan weekly newspaper

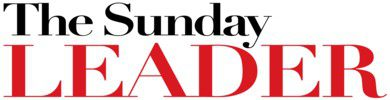
- Type: Weekly newspaper
- Owners: Asanga Seneviratne (72%); Lal Wickrematunge (28%)
- Publisher: Leader Publications (Private) Limited
- Editor: Easwaran Rutnam
- Founded: 19 June 1994
- Language: English
- Headquarters: No. 24 Katukurunduwatte Road, Ratmalana, Sri Lanka
- Sister newspapers: Iruresa (Irudina)
- Website: www.thesundayleader.lk

The Sunday Leader was an English-language Sri Lankan weekly newspaper published by Leader Publications (Private) Limited. It was founded in 1994 and is published from Colombo. Its sister newspapers are the Iruresa (Irudina). Founded by brothers Lasantha Wickrematunge and Lal Wickrematunge, the newspaper is known for its outspoken and controversial news coverage. The newspaper and its staff have been attacked and threatened several times and its founding editor Lasantha Wickrematunge was assassinated.

== History ==
The Sunday Leader was founded in 1994 by brothers Lasantha Wickrematunge and Lal Wickrematunge with the first edition being published on 19 June 1994. The newspaper was associated with silent partner and leading politician and presidential candidate Gamini Dissanayake who was assassinated on 24 October 1994.

The Sunday Leader was shut down by the Sri Lankan government on 22 May 2000 using the recently passed censorship law – the Emergency (Miscellaneous Provisions and Powers) Regulation No.1 of 2000. The government's chief censor Ariya Rubasinghe had ordered that the newspaper cease publication for six months (22 May 2000 to 21 November 2000) following an article in the paper which mocked the country's censorship of the military situation imposed after the embarrassing defeat in the Second Battle of Elephant Pass. The police locked Leader Publications' printing facility and installed armed guards outside the building. Editor Lasantha Wickrematunge subsequently filed a fundamental rights application with the Supreme Court challenging the closure. On 30 June 2000 the Supreme Court ruled that the ban on The Sunday Leader was illegal and ordered the police to re-open the newspaper immediately.

On 5 September 2000 Lasantha Wickrematunge was found guilty of criminally defaming Sri Lankan President Chandrika Kumaratunga in 1995 article in The Sunday Leader. Wickrematunge was sentenced to two years in jail, suspended for five years.

Government minister Mahinda Wijesekara threatened to kill Lasantha Wickrematunge in Parliament on 27 July 2003, saying: "Very soon I'll put him in a room and have him shot or he will be stabbed to death!" The threat followed the expose of corruption in Wijesekara's ministry.

Lasantha Wickrematunge was threatened by President Mahinda Rajapaksa using abusive language in a telephone call on 11 January 2006. According to Wickrematunge the president had threatened to destroy him saying "Fuck your mother, you son of a bloody whore!...I treated you well all this while. Now I will destroy you". Wickrematunge was detained briefly at Bandaranaike International Airport on 21 February 2006 as he arrived for a flight to Geneva. Airport officials had claimed that Wickrematunge required "special permission" to leave Sri Lanka. In late December 2006 an unsuccessful attempt was made to arrest Lasantha Wickrematunge for "endangering national security" after The Sunday Leader published a report exposing a Rs. 500 million luxury bunker to be built in the presidential complex.

Journalist Arthur Wamanan Sornalingam and his mother were arrested by the Criminal Investigation Department on 24 October 2007 following a complaint from government minister Mano Wijeyeratne. The arrest followed an article in The Sunday Leader which alleged that a government department had paid Wijeyeratne's wife's mobile phone bill. Investigative editor Dilrukshi Handunetti was forced to hand over documents relating to the article to the police. Sornalingam subsequently filed a fundamental rights application with the Supreme Court in relation to the arrest.

On 5 December 2008 a judge ordered Leader Publications not to publish any reports about Defence Secretary Gotabhaya Rajapaksa, brother of President Mahinda Rajapaksa, for two weeks. Gotabhaya had gone to the courts to sue Leader Publications for Rs. 2 billion (€14 million) in damages for publishing "slanderous" reports about him.

Editor Lasantha Wickrematunge was shot dead on 8 January 2009. Frederica Jansz became editor of the newspaper following Wickrematunge's murder. On 22 October 2009 Jansz News Editor Munza Mushtaq were sent handwritten death threats through the post. "We will slice you up if you do not stop your writing," the letters threatened. Jansz told Reporters Without Borders Wickrematunge had been sent an identical letter which was compared by a Graphologist who said all three letters were written by the same fist.

The Sunday Leader carried an article on 13 December 2009 entitled "Gota Ordered Them To Be Shot", alleging that Defence Secretary Gotabhaya Rajapaksa ordered the then commander of the 58 Division, Major General Shavendra Silva, to shoot down the surrendering LTTE leaders during the final days of the Sri Lankan Civil War. Sarath Fonseka, the former commander of the Sri Lanka Army, and candidate of the 2010 presidential election who was quoted in the article, initially denied the story, but The Sunday Leader subsequently refuted the denial. The story resulted in Fonseka being charged with ""propagating a false rumour", a violation of emergency regulations. In November 2011 Fonseka was found guilty and sentenced to three years in jail and fined Rs. 5,000.

President Mahinda Rajapaksa threatened Leader Publications chairman Lal Wickrematunge in a phone call on 19 July 2011 after the publication of an article that claimed the president and his son Namal Rajapaksa had received payments from China for use "at their discretion". According to Wickrematunge the president had said: "...if you attack me personally, I will know how to attack you personally too."

Editor Frederica Jansz was threatened and insulted by Defence Secretary Gotabhaya Rajapaksa in a phone call on 6 July 2012. According to Jansz the Defence Secretary said: "Yes, I threatened you. Your type of journalists are pigs who eat shit!...I will put you in jail!... People will kill you!!! People hate you!!!"

In September 2012 Asanga Seneviratne, an ally of President Mahinda Rajapaksa, bought a 72% stake in The Sunday Leader and its sister newspaper the Iruresa. Seneviratne is managing director of Asia Fort Asset Management (Pvt) Ltd and vice president of Sri Lanka Cricket. He is also president of Sri Lanka Rugby Football Union and controversially appointed President Rajapaksa's son Yoshitha Rajapaksa as captain of the Sri Lanka national rugby union team. The Sunday Leader had published a number of reports exposing Seneviratne's property developments and investment deals. According to editor Frederica Jansz, Seneviratne asked her stop publishing articles critical of the Sri Lankan government and the Rajapaksa family. She refused and on 21 September 2012 she was sacked as editor. Jansz was replaced by Sakuntala Perera as editor of The Sunday Leader. Seneviratne denies Jansz claims.

In 2015 May, The Sunday Leader tendered an unconditional apology to Gotabhaya Rajapaksa for a series of articles regarding the purchase of MIG 27 airplanes for the Sri Lanka Air Force.

In 2018 October, The Sunday Leader newspaper and website have suspended operation due to the political turmoil in Sri Lanka after the removal of the Prime Minister by the President.

== Attacks ==
The Sunday Leader and its employees have been subject to numerous attacks since its foundation in 1994. Lasantha Wickrematunge was assaulted on his way home in 1994. On 7 February 1995 Lasantha Wickrematunge and his ex-wife were pulled from their car and beaten. On the night of 18 June 1998 Lasantha Wickrematunge's house in Nugegoda was attacked with Type 56 assault rifles causing extensive damage and narrowly missing Wickrematunge's driver. The attack came after The Sunday Leader exposed irregular financial dealings between Minister of Posts, Telecommunication and the Media Mangala Samaraweera and Sri Lanka Telecom CEO Kamitsumo.

Two photographers for The Sunday Leader, Lakmal Spencer and Ashoka Fernando, were amongst a group of media personnel who were attacked by the police as they covered an opposition rally in Colombo on 15 July 1999. The two men filed a fundamental rights application with the Supreme Court and in October 2001 they were awarded damages of Rs. 86,625 and Rs. 72,750.

On the night of 16 October 2005 armed men entered the printing press of Leader Publications, threatened the manager with "dire consequences" if the newspapers continued to be printed and then set fire to bundles of newspapers. The attack came after The Sunday Leader had published an article which alleged that Prime Minister Mahinda Rajapaksa had misappropriated tsunami relief funds.

The printing press of Leader Publications in Ratmalana was burnt down on 21 November 2007 by a group of armed masked men who entered the building, poured petrol on the printing machines and set fire to them. The attack came after The Morning Leader had been critical of the Asian Tribune's relationship with a government backed paramilitary group.

Lasantha Wickrematunge was shot dead on 8 January 2009 in Colombo. Three days later an editorial appeared in The Sunday Leader written by Wickrematunge before his death in which he predicted his own murder, stating "it will be the government that kills me". Wickrematunge and his newspaper had been highly critical of the government and he had been attacked before. He had been assaulted twice before and his house had been sprayed with machine-gun fire. A number of people including seventeen army personnel were arrested in relation to Wickrematunge's murder but later released. To date no one has been brought to justice for Wickrematunge's murder.

On February 16, 2013 Sunday Leader's Faraz Shauketally, who holds dual British and Sri Lankan citizenship, was rushed to hospital after being shot in the neck. Shauketally was on the phone to a colleague at the Sunday Leader on Friday evening at his home in Mount Lavinia when the call was cut. Shortly afterwards he answered a call and said he had been shot in the neck by three intruders, who had then escaped. President Rajapaksa said he would investigate the incident but nobody was apprehended.

On the 24th of August 2013 Journalist Mandana Ismail Abeywickrema's house was invaded by five armed men who held her at knifepoint as they searched her home before police burst in and shot one of the intruders dead, officials said. Police spokesman Buddhika Siriwardena said three officers were injured when the intruders attacked them with knives. "One intruder was shot dead and the other four have been arrested," he said. Police described the pre-dawn intrusion as an attempted armed robbery but the island's main press freedom organisation, the Free Media Movement (FMM), said they suspected the attack was linked to her work.

== See also ==
- List of newspapers in Sri Lanka
