= Lal Wickrematunge =

- ලාල් වික්‍රමතුංග
- Born: 13 March 1950 (age 76); Colombo, Sri Lanka
- Occupations: Businessman & Media Mogul
- Organization: Leader Publications
- Website: www.thesundayleader.lk

Lal Wickrematunge (born 13 March 1950) is a Sri Lankan business man, media mogul and chairman of Leader Publications which he co-founded with brother Lasantha Wickrematunge. Wickrematunge is the son of Harris Wickrematunge former deputy mayor of Colombo.

== Life and career ==
Wickrematunge was born to Harris Wickrematunge former deputy mayor of Colombo and is the grand nephew of the late George E. de Silva. Wickrematunge worked in the Criminal Investigation Department (Sri Lanka) and worked as a business man before co-founding The Sunday Leader with his brother Lasantha Wickrematunge who was later assassinated in January 2009. Along with his brother Wickrematunge endured constant run-ins with the government for stories his publishing house would carry including a long-standing case made against Wickrematunge and Leader Publications by Gotabhaya Rajapaksa for which he is suing for 2 Billion Rupees (€14 million).
