= Criminal Investigation Department (Sri Lanka) =

Department of the Sri Lanka Police Service

The Criminal Investigation Department (known as CID) of the Sri Lanka Police Service is responsible for carrying out investigations throughout the island into serious crimes, including murders, rape and organized crime cases of a very serious nature that require special skills and complex detection. At times, the CID carries out investigations pertaining to national security.

It is the premier investigation arm of the Sri Lanka Police Department and was established in 1870.

It is headed by a director, who was of a Senior Superintendent of Police (SSP) Grade. However, since the late 1970s, the position of Deputy Inspector General of Police - CID (DIG/CID) was established.

The CID was modeled after the British Police Criminal Investigation Department and hence constitute the plain clothes detectives of the Sri Lanka police. The CID has the power to arrest any person from anywhere in Sri Lanka without getting approval from any Range DIG.

== Notable Directors and D.I.G/C.I.D/ASP Officers ==
- S.A. Dissanayake
- John Attygalle
- Frank de Silva
- W.K.S Weranga Srilal
- H.M Jazeer
- Bennet Perera
- Tyrrell Goonatilleke
- Punya de Silva
- Lionel Gunathilaka
- J. M Saparamadu
- O. K. Hemachandra
- Keerthi Gajanayaka
- Sisira Mendis
- Lal Wickrematunge
- A Bandula Wickramasinghe
- Rayan Steve Hardy.(ASP)
