= Upali Wijewardene =

Sri Lankan businessman

- උපාලි විජේවර්ධන
- Born: 17 February 1938; Kamburupitiya, Sri Lanka
- Disappeared: 13 February 1983 (aged 44); Straits of Malacca
- Education: Royal College, Colombo
- Alma mater: Queens' College, Cambridge
- Occupation: Businessman
- Known for: Founder of the Upali Group (Kandos Chocolate, Upali Air and Upali Newspapers)
- Spouse: Lakmini Ratwatte
- Relatives: Wijewardene family

Philip Upali Wijewardene (17 February 1938 – 13 February 1983: Sinhala: උපාලි විජේවර්ධන) was a Sri Lankan business magnate and entrepreneur. In 1983, Wijewardene had a net worth of US $50 million. He was the founder and chairman of Upali Group, the first multi-national business in Sri Lanka. Upali Group has businesses in the US, UK, Malaysia, Thailand, Singapore and Hong Kong. The Upali Group diversified from confectionery to electronics, automobile manufacturing, publishing, print media, leisure, and aviation. It developed many brands, including Kandos, Delta, Unic, Upali Air, Upali Mazda and Upali Newspapers, which Insight Magazine UK said was achieved "largely through bravado and wit."

Wijewardene was presumed dead on 13 February 1983, when his private Learjet disappeared over the Straits of Malacca soon after leaving Malaysia en route to Colombo.

== Early life and family ==
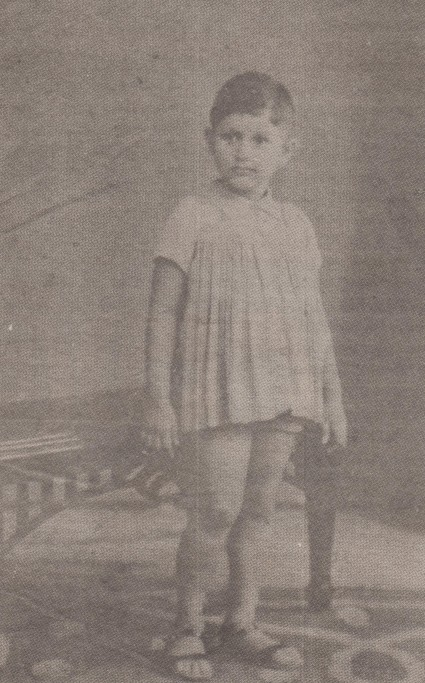
Upali Wijewardene as a young child.

Wijewardene was born on 17 February 1938, at his paternal grandmother's house in Sri Ramya, Colombo, to Don Walter Tudugalle Wijewardene and Anula Kalyanawathie Wijesinghe. The youngest and only son of his parents, he had two older sisters, Anoja and Kalyani. The Wijewardene family was from Kelaniya. His grandfather, Muhandiram Don Phillip Wijeywardene, a timber merchant, founded the family business. Wijewardene lost his father when he was eighteen months old, and was raised by his mother in the family home Sedawatte Walawwe in Kolonnawa.

The Wijewardene family had made its money by supplying timber for construction in the city of Colombo. They reinvested their profits in various ventures, including real estate, and became influential in local politics. Upali's paternal uncle, Don Richard Wijewardena, was a press baron, and his cousin J. R. Jayewardene became the second President of Sri Lanka, serving from 1978 to 1989. Ray Wijewardene, a cousin, was an engineer, aviator, inventor, and Olympic athlete. His sister Anoja married Stanley Wijesundera, a professor of chemistry and later the first vice-chancellor of the University of Colombo, while his other sister Kalyani married Dr. G.M. Attygalle.

On 7 November 1975, Wijewardene married Lakmini Ratwatte, daughter of Dr. Seevali Ratwatte, niece of Sirimavo Bandaranaike, and granddaughter of Barnes Ratwatte Dissawa. Wijewardene moved into a house on Thurstan Road, designed by Geoffrey Bawa, which included a helipad for his private helicopter. He also owned a country house, Sunnycroft Bungalow, in Nuwara Eliya. He held the position of Basnayake Nilame (chief lay custodian) at the Kelaniya Raja Maha Vihara, a temple that had been supported by his family. An amateur racing enthusiast, Wijewardene participated in races with his mother's Opel Kapitan at the Katukurunde Races in the early 1960s.

== Education ==
Wijewardene attended Ladies' College, Colombo, along with his two older sisters. Afterwards, he enrolled at Royal College, Colombo and later attended St John's School, Leatherhead. He studied economics at Queens College, Cambridge from 1956 to 1959, earning a BA degree. At Cambridge, he held the position of secretary of the Marshall Society.

== Early ventures ==
On his return to Ceylon in 1959, Wijewardene joined the British manufacturing company Lever Brothers as a management trainee and was assigned the responsibility of overseeing soap processing. However, he left Lever Brothers in 1961 due to a disagreement with the chairman.

Delta toffee

Wijewardene ventured into business by setting up a confectionary company and establishing a candy ball machine on his property on Bloemendaal Road. He later expanded the business and branded it 'Delta Toffee'.

Kandos chocolates

In 1970, after the passing of his maternal uncle, senator Sarath Chandradasa Wijesinghe, Wijewardene assumed control of the 'Ceylon Chocolates Company'. He expanded the 'Kandos chocolates' brand from a domestic to an international market, and with the help of a friend, Ratnam, he cultivated 14,000 acres of cocoa in Malaysia. During the transition of the business, he acquired cocoa plantations, processing plants, and factories in Malaysia, Singapore, and Thailand.

== Upali Group ==
Wijewardene founded the Upali Group of Companies in the mid-1960s, consolidating his holdings and forming a conglomerate of companies.

Manufacturing

Wijewardene began soap manufacturing, introducing the brands Crystal and Tingle Sikuru.

Aviation

In the aviation sector, he founded Upali Air in 1968. Flight operations started in the late 1970s with several aircraft for private, domestic and international flights.

Electronics

He started the Upali Electronic Company in the 1970s, introducing radios, calculators, wall clocks, air-conditioners and television sets. These were assembled locally under the import restrictions of the time.

Automotive

In 1970, Wijewardene founded the Upali Motor Company (UMC), which began assembly of Mazda Capellas under license in his Homagama plant These cars were known locally as the UMC Mazda or, more colloquially, Upali Mazda. Over 500 units were assembled. In 1978, UMC began the assembly of the Fiat 128, known locally as Upali Fiat.

Print media

In 1981, he started Upali Newspapers and published daily and weekly newspapers, including Divaina, The Island and Navaliya. He used his aircraft to deliver newspapers to remote areas such as Anuradhapura and Jaffna.

In February 1981, he published a comic, Chithra Mithra. Within a few months, the magazine reached a circulation of 200,000. The media initially described the magazine as "romance, booze, money, travel, dreams, adventure, and wild women," crammed into 16 pages. It expanded into 32 pages, with a different story on every page. Editor Janaka Ratnayake noted that the publication had "many topics—romance, detective, sci-fi, heroes, two pages built around movie stars, and almost a page of pen pals" (1993). All the stories were serialised and in black and white with a "spot" of one additional colour. The comic magazine fell apart after Wijewardene's death and ceased publication in 1986. Ratnayake attributed the magazine's failure to Wijewardene's early demise, the sub-standard printing quality of the paper and competition from other magazines.

In 1980, Wijewardene travelled to Silicon Valley and signed five agreements, including one with Motorola. The construction of chip plants started in 1983. However, with the start Sri Lankan civil war and bombing across the country, and some of the engineers assigned to the construction of the plants were killed, and the chip manufacturers left Sri Lanka for Malaysia.

== Horse racing ==
Wijewardene was influential in restarting horse racing at the Nuwara Eliya Race Course. He was the chairman of the board of stewards of the Sri Lanka Turf Club and raced in Sri Lanka and England, where his horse "Rasa Penang" won the Jersey Stakes at Royal Ascot, ridden by the world-famous jockey Lester Piggott.

In 1980, he won the Singapore Derby at the Bukit Timah Race Course and the Perak Derby at the Perak Turf Club in Malaysia with his horse "Vaaron.". He raced "General Atty" too, who won many races in England. He would fly to the races in his private aircraft, and made it a point to fly from Newmarket Racecourse in England to Nuwara Eliya Racecourse in Sri Lanka to watch his horses and ponies racing.

== Government ==
In 1978, Wijewardene was appointed by President J. R. Jayewardene as the first director general of the Greater Colombo Economic Commission (GCEC), which subsequently evolved into the Board of Investment of Sri Lanka. The Sri Lankan political establishment did not favour his arrival in politics. Wijewardene worked to attract foreign investment to develop local industries in the new open economy. He formed free trade zones in Katunayake, Biyagama and Koggala. He set up an organization called 'Ruhunu Udanaya' and worked to create opportunities for young people in Kamburupitiya and the surrounding areas to learn English and computer technology.

== Disappearance ==
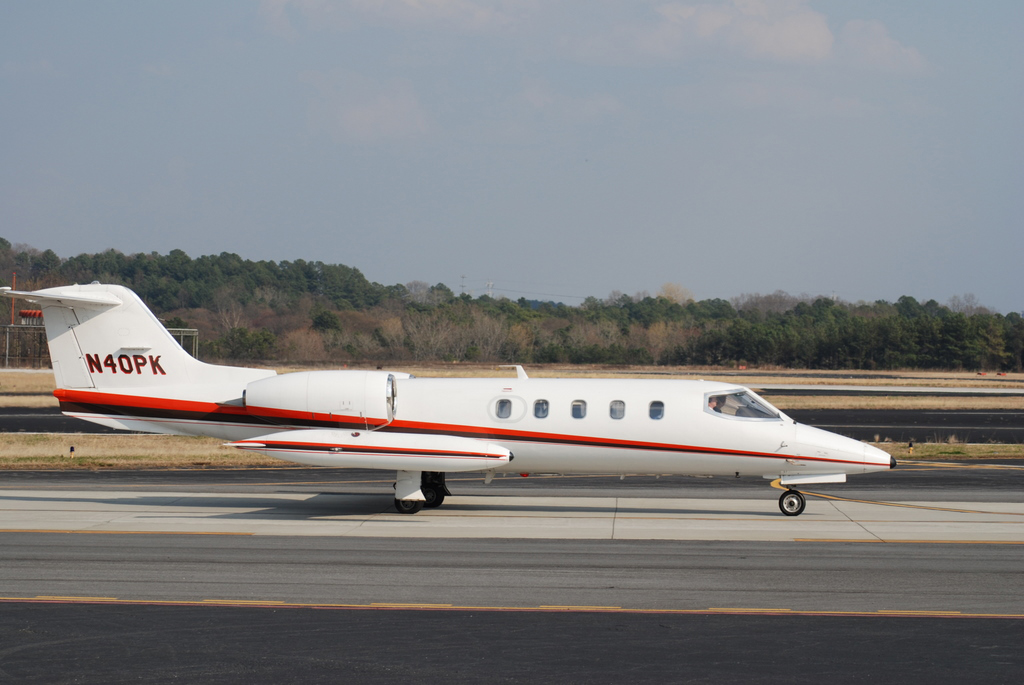
Learjet 35A

Wijewardene, a licensed pilot, travelled on a Sri Lankan diplomatic passport as chairman of the GCEC. He owned a private jet, a Learjet 35A, which he had modified with another controller for the rear body. His plane took off from Kuala Lumpur at 8:41 p.m. on 13 February 1983, bound for Colombo. On board with him were his Malaysian lawyer S.M. Ratnam, Upali Group Director Ananda Peli Muhandiram, pilot captain Noel Anandappa (ex-SLAF), co-pilot captain Sydney De Zoysa (former Air Ceylon Captain), and steward S. Senenayake. Fifteen minutes later, the aircraft disappeared while flying over the Straits of Malacca. Extensive search operations by air and naval units of Sri Lanka, India, the United States, the Soviet Union, Australia, Indonesia, and Malaysia failed to locate any evidence of a crash.

A wheel that was thought to be part of the disappeared plane was found on Pandang Island, leading the authorities to conclude that the plane had suffered a mid-air explosion. Later investigations revealed that the plane manufacturer did not make this wheel. According to K. Godage, former Malaysian High Commissioner, the government of Sri Lanka showed no interest in investigating the disappearance further. Rumours later circulated that Wijewardene was to have been named the minister of finance by president J. R. Jayewardene the next day, on his return to Colombo.

== See also ==
- List of people who disappeared
- Upali Air
- Upali Newspapers
