= Upali Newspapers =

Sri Lankan media company

Upali Newspapers (Pvt) Ltd
- Company type: Private
- Industry: Media
- Founder: Upali Wijewardene
- Headquarters: Colombo, Sri Lanka
- Area served: Sri Lanka

Upali Newspapers (Private) Limited (UNL) is a Sri Lankan media company which publishes a number of national newspapers and magazines. UNL was founded by Upali Wijewardene, nephew of media mogul D. R. Wijewardena. Upali Wijewardene started publishing two Sunday newspapers, Sunday Island and Divaina Irida Sangrahaya, in 1981. The two newspapers' daily counterparts - Divaina and The Island - started in 1982. Upali Wijewardene died in a mysterious air accident on 13 February 1983 and control of his newspapers passed to his widow Lakmini, and her father Sivali Ratwatte, brother of SLFP leader Sirimavo Bandaranaike. UNL also publishes Bindu, Navaliya, Randiwa and Vidusara.
