= The Island (Sri Lanka) =

English-language daily newspaper in Sri Lanka

- Official logo of The Island
- Type: Daily newspaper
- Format: Print, online
- Owner: Upali Newspapers
- Publisher: Upali Newspapers Private Limited
- Founded: 1981
- Language: English
- Headquarters: 223, Bloemendhal Road, Colombo 13, Sri Lanka
- Circulation: 70,000 (Daily Island); 103,000 (Sunday Island)
- Sister newspapers: Divaina
- Website: island.lk

The Island is a daily English-language newspaper in Sri Lanka. It is published by Upali Newspapers. A sister newspaper of Divaina, The Island was established in 1981 by businessman Upali Wijewardene. Its Sunday edition, Sunday Island, commenced publishing in 1991. The Island is currently owned by the Welgama family.

The newspaper publishes both print and online editions, with its digital operation providing news, business, sports, features, opinion and other content. The daily newspaper currently has a circulation of 70,000 and its Sunday edition, 103,000 per issue. Its political leaning is pro-Sri Lanka Freedom Party.

== See also ==
- List of newspapers in Sri Lanka
- Divaina
- Upali Newspapers
- List of newspapers in Sri Lanka
- Media of Sri Lanka
