= Upali Air =

Sri Lankan airline

IATA	ICAO	Call sign
—	—	UPALI
- Founded: 1968
- Commenced operations: 1978
- Ceased operations: 1996
- Hubs: Ratmalana Airport
- Headquarters: Colombo, Ceylon
- Key people: Upali Wijewardene

Upali Air was a Sri Lankan airline. It was the island's first domestic airline.

== History ==
Upali Air was founded at the end of the 1960s by Sri Lankan entrepreneur Upali Wijewardene. This businessman was well known for his skill in buying companies on the brink of bankruptcy and making them successful.

Upali Air began operating with a single 20-seat De Havilland Canada DHC-6 Twin Otter airplane. Later other small airplanes were added to its fleet.

This company ceased to exist not long after Wijewardene's disappearance and presumed death in a plane crash in February 1983. The Learjet 35A, in which Wijewardene crashed, was registered to the airline. Although other companies of the Upali group continued operating after the founder's death, the Sri Lankan Civil War between the LTTE and the government caused the airline to cease its operations. The increased controls and security measures, along with converting civilian airfields such as Ratmalana Airport into military bases for the Sri Lankan Air Force made Upali Air's operation no longer viable.

== Routes ==
Country-city	Airport code		Airport name	Notes	Refs
Country-city	IATA	ICAO	Airport name	Notes	Refs
Colombo	RML	VCCC	Ratmalana Airport	Terminated	

== Fleet ==
Aircraft	Fleet	Introduced	Retired
Bell 206 L	1	TBA	1996
Cessna 152 II	2	TBA	1996
Cessna U206G	1	TBA	1986
De Havilland Twin Otter	1	1980	1985
Cessna Citation II	1	TBA	1982
Learjet 35A	1	1982	1983

== Accidents and incidents ==
On 13 February 1983, a Learjet 35A took off from Kuala Lumpur at 8:41 pm, bound for Colombo. On board was Wijewardene, his Malaysian lawyer S.M. Ratnam, Upali Group Director Ananda Peli Muhandiram, pilot Capt. Noel Anandappa, co-pilot Capt. Sydney De Zoysa, and steward S. Senenakye. Fifteen minutes after takeoff, the aircraft disappeared while flying over the Strait of Malacca. Search operations by air and naval units of Sri Lanka, India, the United States, the Soviet Union, Australia, Indonesia, and Malaysia failed to locate evidence of a crash.
