= Fiat 128 =

Small family car

- Fiat 128 saloon (first series)

Overview
- Manufacturer: Fiat
- Also called: Nasr 128 GLS 1300 (Egypt); SEAT 128 (Spain); Zastava 101/128/Skala (Yugoslavia)
- Production: 1969–1985 (Fiat, Italy); 1971–1990 (Fiat, Argentina); 1976–1980 (3P, SEAT); 1971–2010 (Yugoslavia, Serbia and Montenegro, and Serbia)
- Assembly: Italy: Rivalta, Turin; Argentina: Buenos Aires (Sevel Argentina); Colombia: Bogotá (CCA); Egypt: Helwan (Nasr); Morocco: Casablanca (Somaca); South Africa: Rosslyn; Sri Lanka: Homagama (Upali); Zambia: Livingstone (Livingstone Motor Assemblers Ltd)

Body and chassis
- Class: Small family car (C)
- Body style: 2/4-door saloon; 3-door estate; 5-door estate (Argentina only); 2-door pickup (South Africa); 2-door coupé (128 Sport Coupé); 3-door coupé (128 3P)
- Layout: Front-engine, front-wheel-drive
- Related: Fiat X1/9

Powertrain
- Engine: petrol: 1116 cc 128 A I4; 1290 cc 128 A1 I4
- Transmission: 4-speed manual

Dimensions
- Wheelbase: 2,445 mm (96.3 in)
- Length: 3,850 mm (151.6 in)
- Width: 1,590 mm (62.6 in)
- Height: 1,340 mm (52.8 in)
- Kerb weight: 750–770 kg (1,653–1,698 lb)

Chronology
- Predecessor: Fiat 1100 R
- Successor: Fiat Ritmo; Fiat Regata

The Fiat 128 is a small family car which was manufactured and marketed by Fiat from 1969 to 1985. The bodystyles were a two- or four-door sedan, three- or five-door station wagon as well as two- or three-door coupé.

With engineering by Dante Giacosa and engine design by Aurelio Lampredi, the 128 was noted for its relatively roomy passenger and cargo volume—enabled by a breakthrough innovation to the transversely-mounted front-engine, front-drive layout which became the layout "adopted by virtually every other manufacturer in the world" for front-wheel drive. Fiat promoted in its advertising that mechanical features consumed only 20% of the vehicle's volume. The 128 running gear and engine, reconfigured for a rear mid-engine, rear-wheel-drive layout, were used in the Fiat X1/9 sports car.

Named European Car of the Year in 1970, over three million were ultimately manufactured.

In 2012 automotive journalist Jamie Kitman called the 128 a "pioneer of the small cars we drive today."

== Development ==
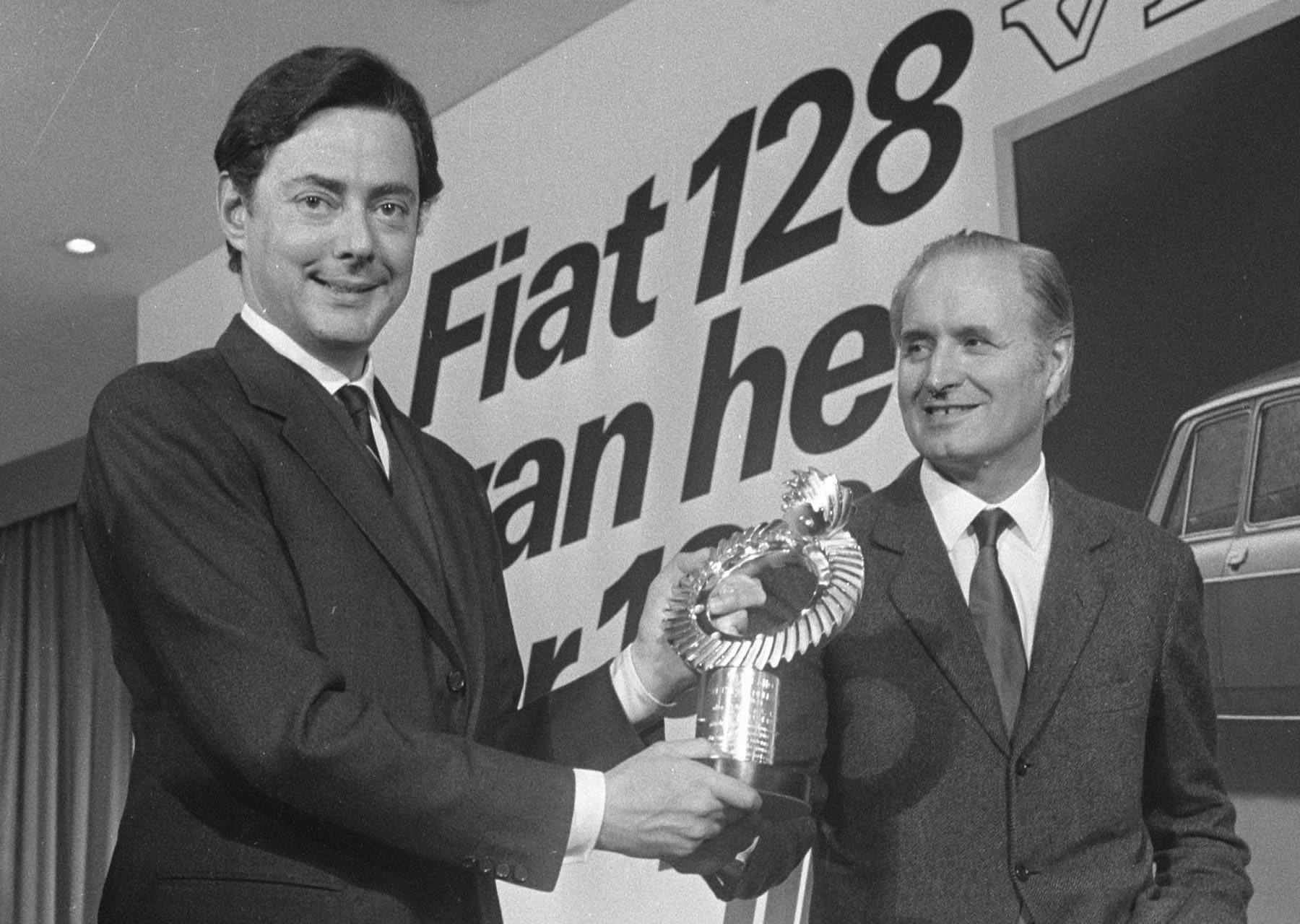
Umberto Agnelli and Dante Giacosa receiving the 1970 European Car of the Year at the Hilton Hotel in Amsterdam, 5 February 1970

With engineering by Dante Giacosa and engine design by Aurelio Lampredi, the 128 was noted for its relatively roomy passenger and cargo volume—enabled by a breakthrough innovation to the front-engine, front-drive layout which became the layout "adopted by virtually every other manufacturer in the world" for front-wheel drive. Giorgetto Giugiaro noted that in 1970, Volkswagen completely dismantled a Fiat 128, recognizing it as the reference for their forthcoming Golf.

Fiat promoted in its advertising that Enzo Ferrari drove a 128 as his personal vehicle."

Fiat built an entirely new plant in Rivalta di Torino, north-west of Turin, specifically to manufacture the new 128. In all, 2,776,000 sedans and wagons were built in Italy, plus 330,800 coupés and 3Ps.

== Front drive innovation ==
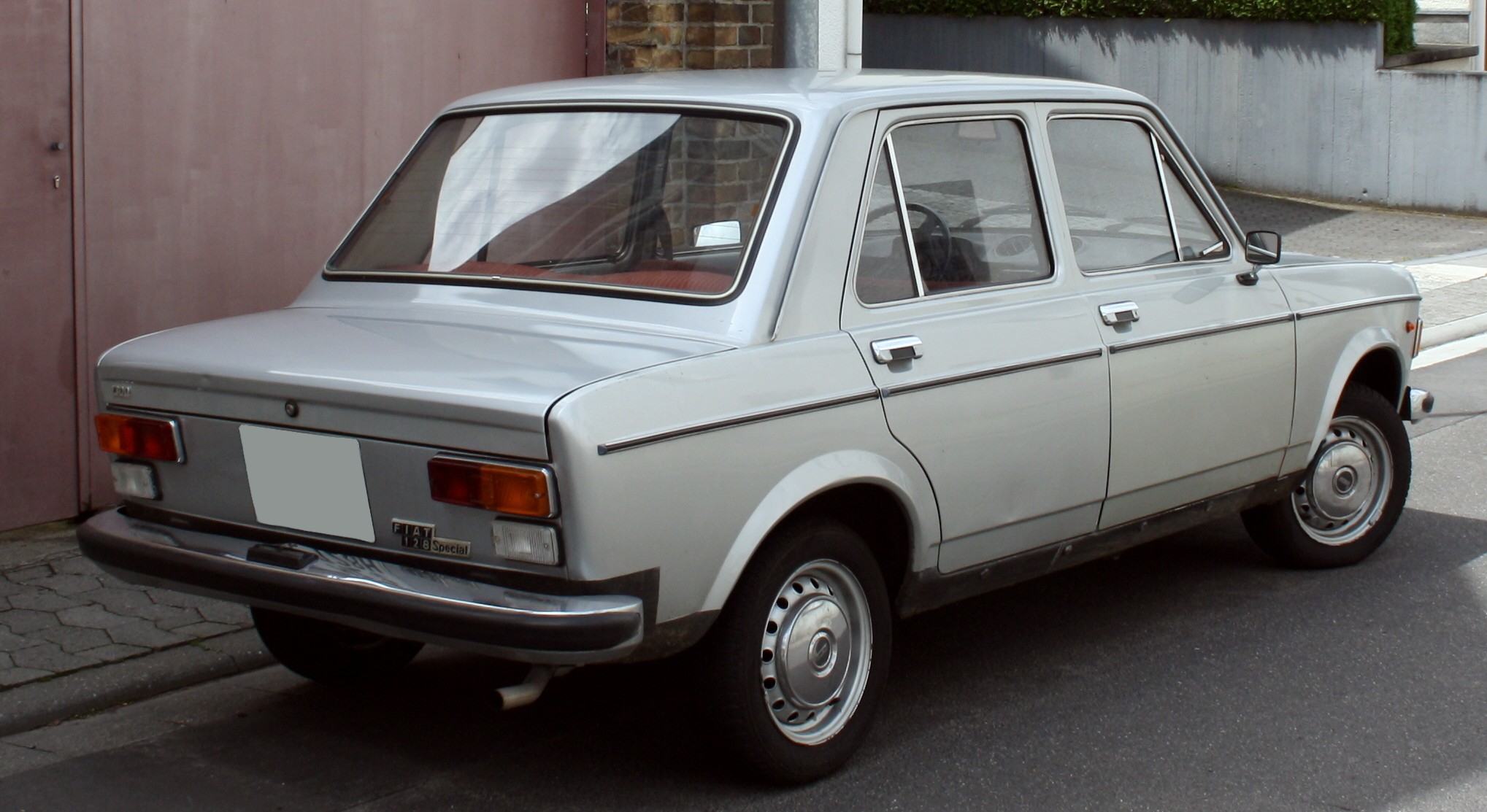
Fiat 128 Special sedan (rear view)

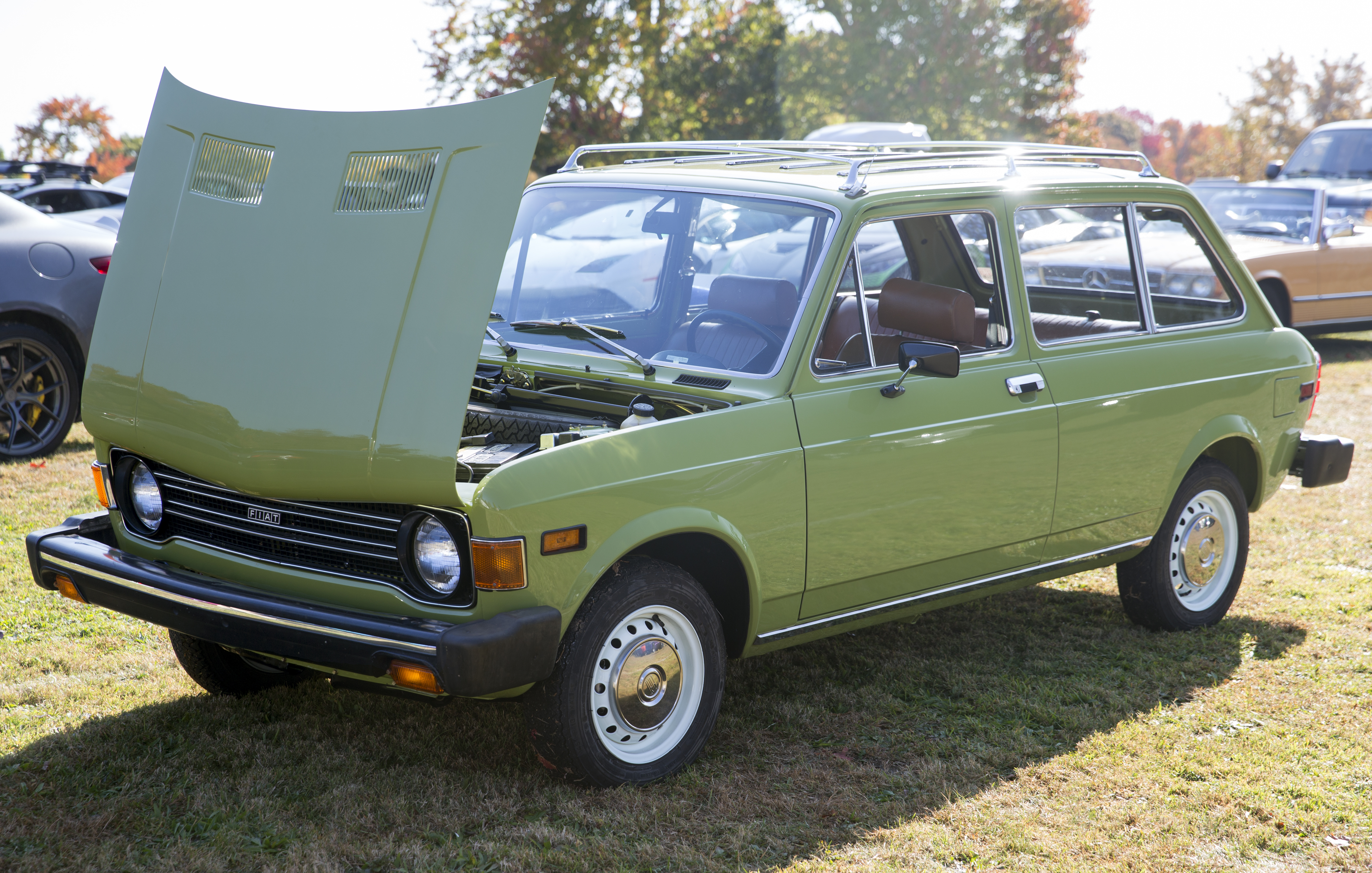
Fiat 128 Familiare 3-door station wagon (US-spec)

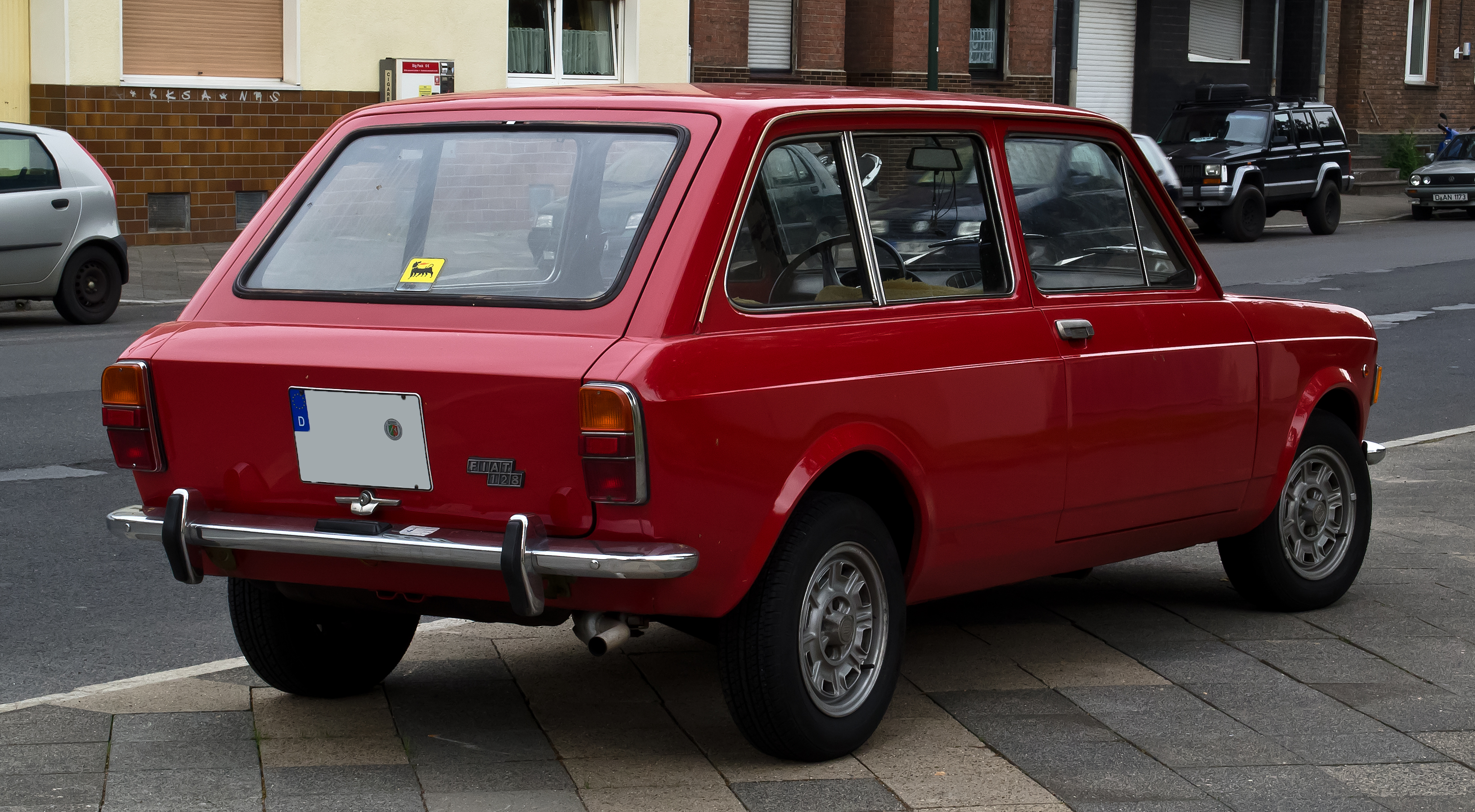
Fiat 128 Familiare (rear view)

Front-wheel drive had previously been introduced to small, inexpensive cars by BMC, firstly with the Mini in 1959 and then with the larger 1100/1300 series in 1962. During the mid-1960s, Fiat set about designing a new car to compete with the latter. The BMC design of Alec Issigonis had the transmission and engine sharing a single oil sump—despite disparate lubricating requirements—and located the engine's radiator at the side of the engine, away from the flow of fresh air and drawing heated rather than cool air over the engine. The layout often required the engine to be removed to service the clutch.

The Fiat 128's arrangement had numerous differences. As engineered by Dante Giacosa, it featured a transverse-mounted engine with unequal-length drive shafts and an innovative compact clutch release mechanism (designed by Ettore Cordiano)—an arrangement which Fiat had strategically tested on a previous production model for a full five years, the Primula from its less market-critical subsidiary, Autobianchi. The layout enabled the engine and gearbox to be located side by side without sharing lubricating fluid while orienting an electrically controlled cooling fan toward fresh air flow. By using the Primula as a test-bed, Fiat was able to sufficiently resolve the layout's disadvantages, including uneven side-to-side power transmission, uneven tire wear and potential torque steer, the tendency for the power of the engine alone to steer the car under heavy acceleration.

The compact and efficient layout—a transversely-mounted engine with transmission mounted beside the engine driving the front wheels through an offset final-drive and unequal-length driveshafts—subsequently became common with competitors and an industry standard.

The layout was sufficiently flexible that Fiat reconfigured the 128 drive-train as a mid-engined layout for the Fiat X1/9.

== Design ==
The all new 1.1 litre Fiat SOHC engine, engineered by noted engine designer Aurelio Lampredi, featured an iron block mated to an aluminum head along with a belt-driven single overhead camshaft.

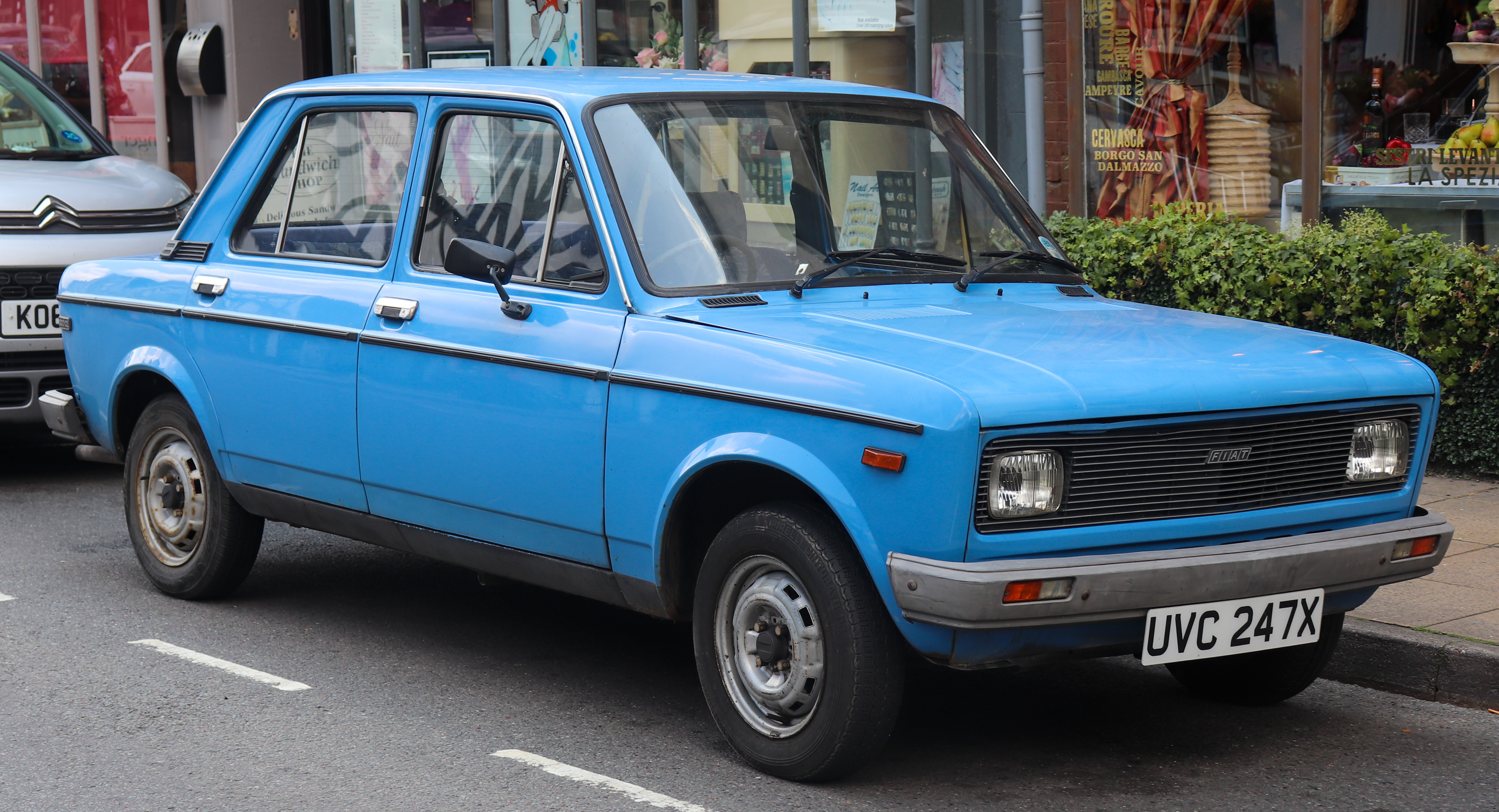
Fiat 128 second series (1976) with new rectangular headlights

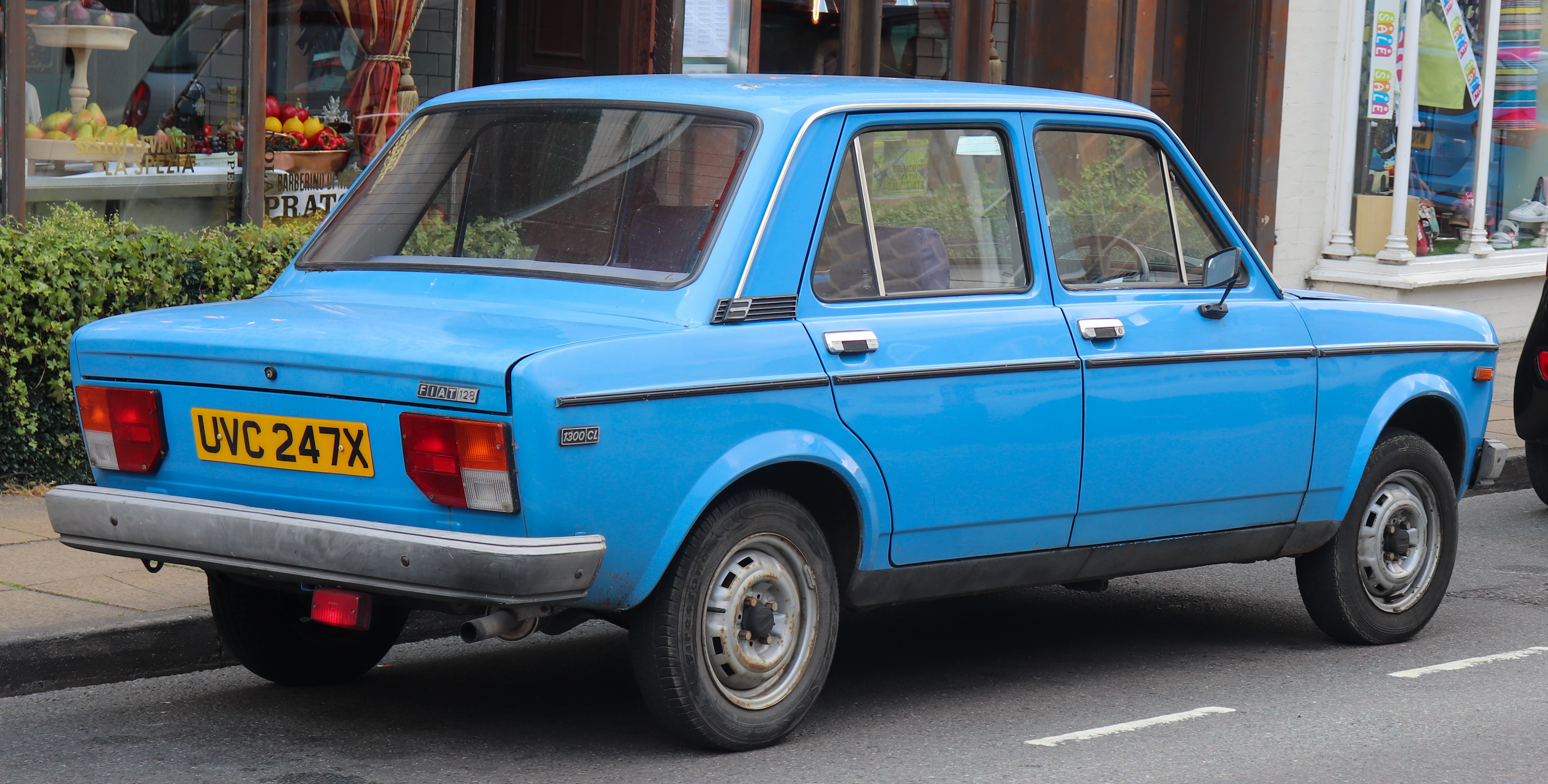
Second series (rear view)

The 128 was styled similarly to the 124 and 125 and featured rack-and-pinion steering, Pirelli 145R13 Cinturato or 145R13 Michelin ZX radial tyres, front disc brakes, independent rear suspension with a transverse leaf spring, and a strut-type front suspension with integral anti-roll bar.

Initially, the 128 was available as a two-door or four-door sedan. At the 1970 Turin Motor Show a three-door station wagon model called "Familiare" was added to the line-up. On launch, the car was only available with a 1116 cc engine with 55 PS (40 kW; 54 hp), or 49 hp (37 kW) in USA.

The 128 sedan and estate underwent a small refresh in 1972, featuring revisions on the grille, bumpers, dashboard and steering wheel plus addition of a brake servo. 1974 saw the launch of the 128 Special, with rectangular headlights, chrome accents, extra equipment, better seats and upholstery, plus availability of a 1290 cc engine, producing 60 PS (44 kW; 59 hp).

In 1976, the sedan and stationwagon received a proper facelift with a new front and rectangular headlights for all versions, new bumpers with incorporated indicators, redesigned tail lights for the sedan and a new dashboard, as well as modifications to the engines and gearbox in order to reduce the fuel consumption. At this time, the wagon was renamed "Panorama" and received a single rear side window of a somewhat smaller area than the earlier split unit.

Production of all 128s except that of the base 1,100 cc powered model ended in 1979 after the introduction of the Fiat Ritmo/Strada in 1978. In 1980 production of the small three-door station wagon Panorama was dropped from the range and 128 production finally ended in 1985.

== Road test ==
The British "Motor" magazine tested a Fiat 128 in April 1970, shortly after its UK launch. The car had a top speed of 85.4 mph (137.4 km/h) and accelerated from 0 to 60 mph (0 to 97 km/h) in 15.5 seconds. An "overall" fuel consumption of 27.5 miles per imperial gallon (10.3 L/100 km; 22.9 mpg_{‑US}) was recorded. This put it fractionally behind the contemporary Morris 1300 on maximum speed but usefully ahead on acceleration. The two were closely matched on fuel economy, where both were outrun by the Ford Escort 1300 Super also included in the comparison, here in its four-door version. The Fiat's £876 manufacturer's recommended price was not too far above the Morris 1300's £830 and the Escort's £838. The testers commended the Fiat's interior space and excellent performance. Wind and road noise were low, but engine noise was not. The 128 went on sale on the UK market around the same time as the Rootes Group's Hillman Avenger, and shortly before the Vauxhall Viva was transformed from its second generation to its third generation. The market leader in this sector at the time was British Leyland's 1100 and 1300 range. Sales of imported cars in the UK were in the first stages of a sharp rise in their market share at the beginning of the 1970s, with Fiat and likes of Datsun, Renault and Volkswagen being particularly successful.

== Variants ==
=== 128 Rally ===
Fiat 128 Rally
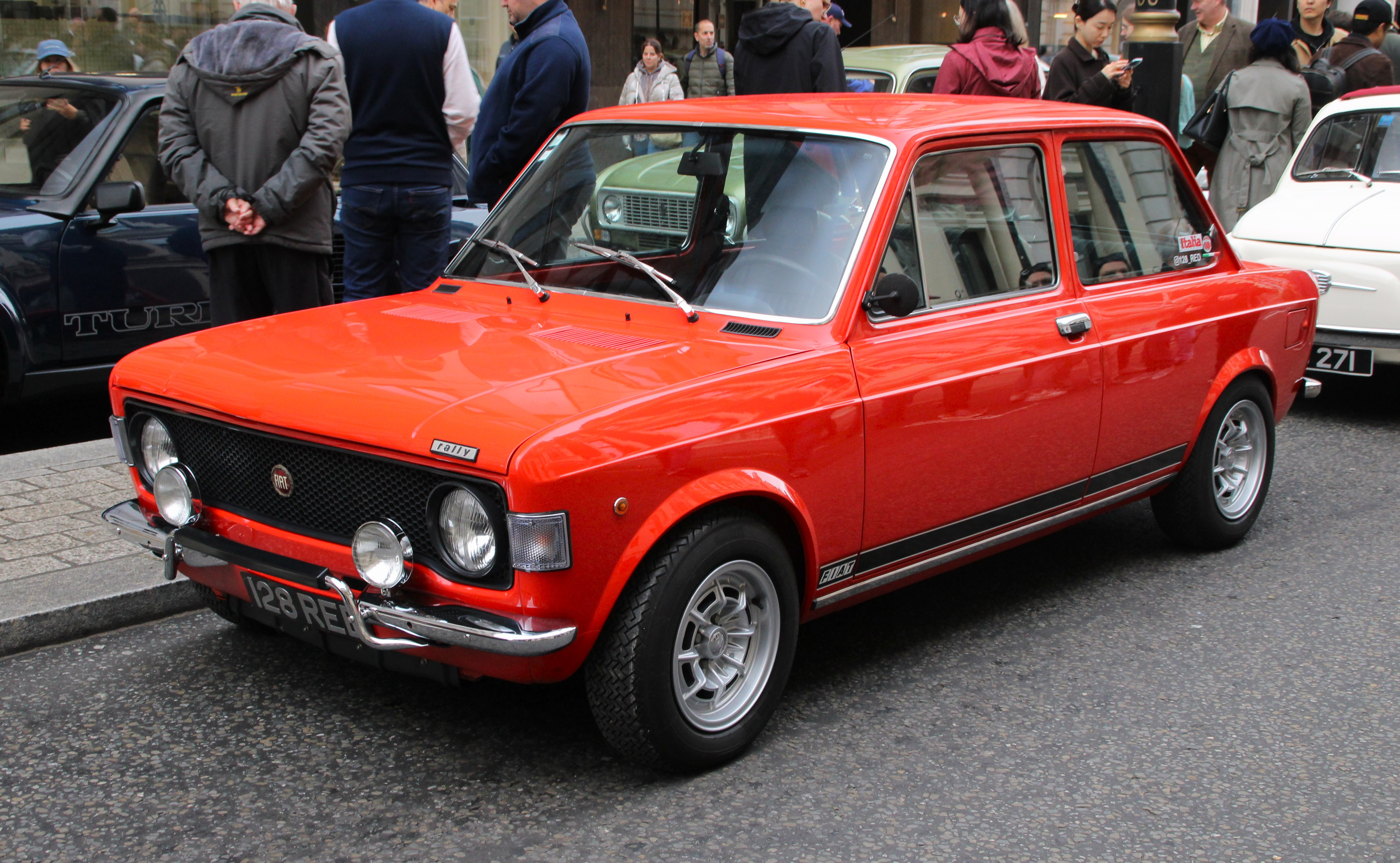
- 1972 Fiat 128 Rally

Overview
- Production: 1971–1974

Dimensions
- Wheelbase: 2,448 mm (96.4 in)
- Length: 3,876 mm (152.6 in)
- Width: 1,590 mm (62.6 in)
- Height: 1,390 mm (54.7 in)
- Kerb weight: 820 kg (1,808 lb)

The Fiat 128 Rally was a sporty, 1.3-litre-engined version of the 128 two-door saloon, introduced at the 41st Geneva Motor Show in March 1971 and produced up to 1974. However, the model, uniquely in the 4-door body style, was introduced to the South African market alongside the 2-door coupé from 1974 onward, as a locally-built model until its replacement in 1978 with the updated "South Africa-only" Rally model based on the 128 second series sedan. The 1978 South African update was based on the 4-door "Comfort" model (2nd series) but equipped with a twin choke carburettor and a redesigned inlet manifold to give it more power than the standard models, recording 53.4 KW (73 HP) power. In the interior, the model featured "sporty" bucket front seats with head restraints. Color-coordinated stripping accentuated the front seats as part of the "sporty" flair. Externally, the model came with three-color "waistline" stripes on either side of the vehicle, rectangular halogen spotlights fitted on the front bumper, front and boot spoilers, wider tires (165/70 SR3), and in three body colors, namely, bright red, yellow, and white.

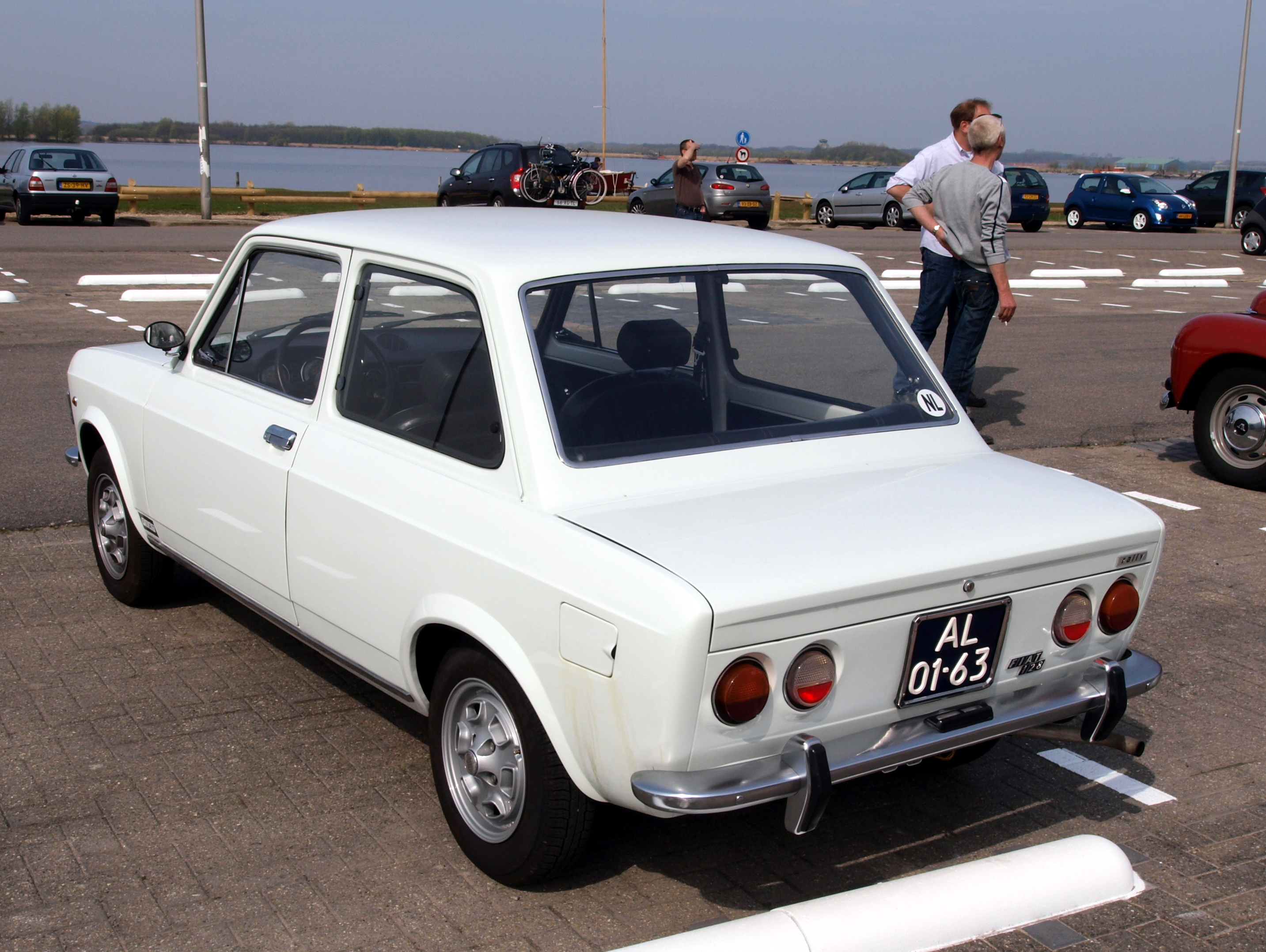
Quadruple round tail lamps were a peculiarity of the 128 Rally. This car is equipped with the factory-option alloy wheels.

Compared to the regular 128's 1,116 cc four-cylinder engine, the Rally's type 128 AR engine had been bored out 6 mm to 86 mm—while keeping the 55.5 mm stroke—for a total displacement of 1,290 cc (79 cu in). There was also a twin-choke Weber 32 DMTR carburettor, revised valve timing and a slightly higher 8.9:1 compression ratio. Engine output was now 67 DIN-rated metric horsepower (49 kW; 66 hp) at 6,200 rpm and 88 DIN-rated newton-metres (65 lb⋅ft) of torque at 4,000 rpm. Other mechanical improvements were the addition of a vacuum servo, an engine protection plate, better tyres, new gear ratios for the 4-speed transmission, a higher capacity battery and an alternator in place of the dynamo.

Several exterior features set the Rally apart from other 128s. At the front, there was a black radiator grille, carrying the round Fiat emblem typical of the marque's sports cars; split bumpers joined by a tubular steel bar; and halogen headlamps and bumper-mounted auxiliary lamps. A curious feature of the South African-specific 128 Rally was that it was based on the four-door sedan rather than the two-door. Otherwise, it was identical in appearance to the overseas model. At the rear of the 128 Rally, dual round tail lamps replaced the square ones found on the regular two-door 128. As part of the sporty look, stripes adorned the side sills, while "Rally" badging ornamented the front bonnet and boot lid.

The interior was upholstered in black leatherette, and the dashboard housed upgraded instrumentation: a tachometer was standard equipment, and water temperature and oil pressure gauges took the place of the ashtray, relocated to the centre console. Front sports seats with headrests and a two-spoke sports steering wheel replaced the standard items.

At the October 1972 update of the 128 model range, the Rally received new upholstery (leatherette with cloth seat centres) and a black plastic protection to the front bumper tube.

=== 128 Coupé and 3P Berlinetta ===
Fiat 128 Coupé Fiat 128 3P Berlinetta
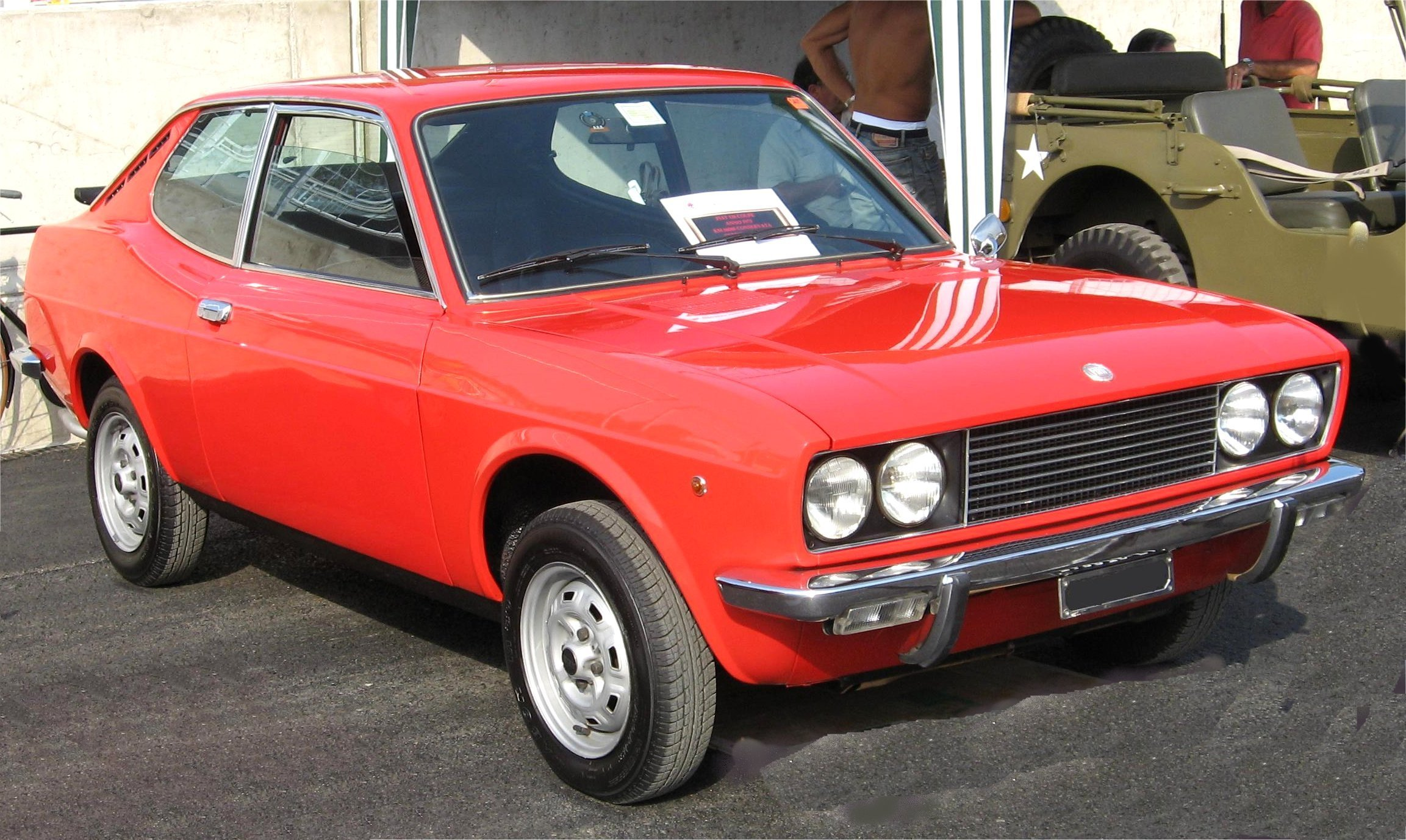
- 1972 Fiat 128 Coupé SL 1100

Overview
- Production: 1971–1975 (Coupé); 1975–1980 (3P)

Body and chassis
- Body style: 2-door coupé 3-door hatchback coupé (128 3P)

Dimensions
- Wheelbase: 2,223 mm (87.5 in)
- Length: 3,808 mm (149.9 in)
- Width: 1,560 mm (61.4 in)
- Height: 1,310 mm (51.6 in)
- Kerb weight: 810–820 kg (1,786–1,808 lb)

At the 53rd Turin Motor Show of November 1971 Fiat introduced the 128 Coupé, also called 128 Sport, a 2-door, 4-seat coupé designed in-house. Compared with the 128 saloon, the coupé had a 23 cm (9.1 in) shorter wheelbase (at 2,223 mm [87.5 in]), and tracks 20 mm wider at the front and 45 mm narrower at the rear.

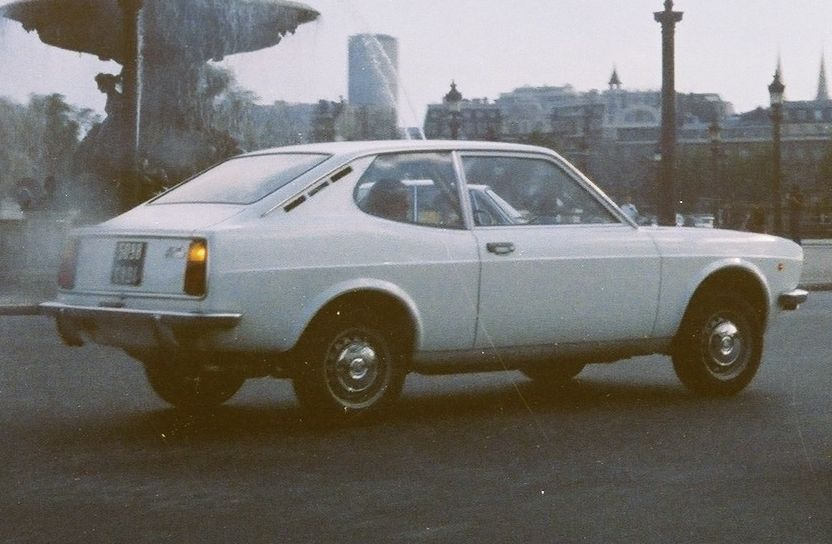
Fiat 128 Coupé SL (rear view)

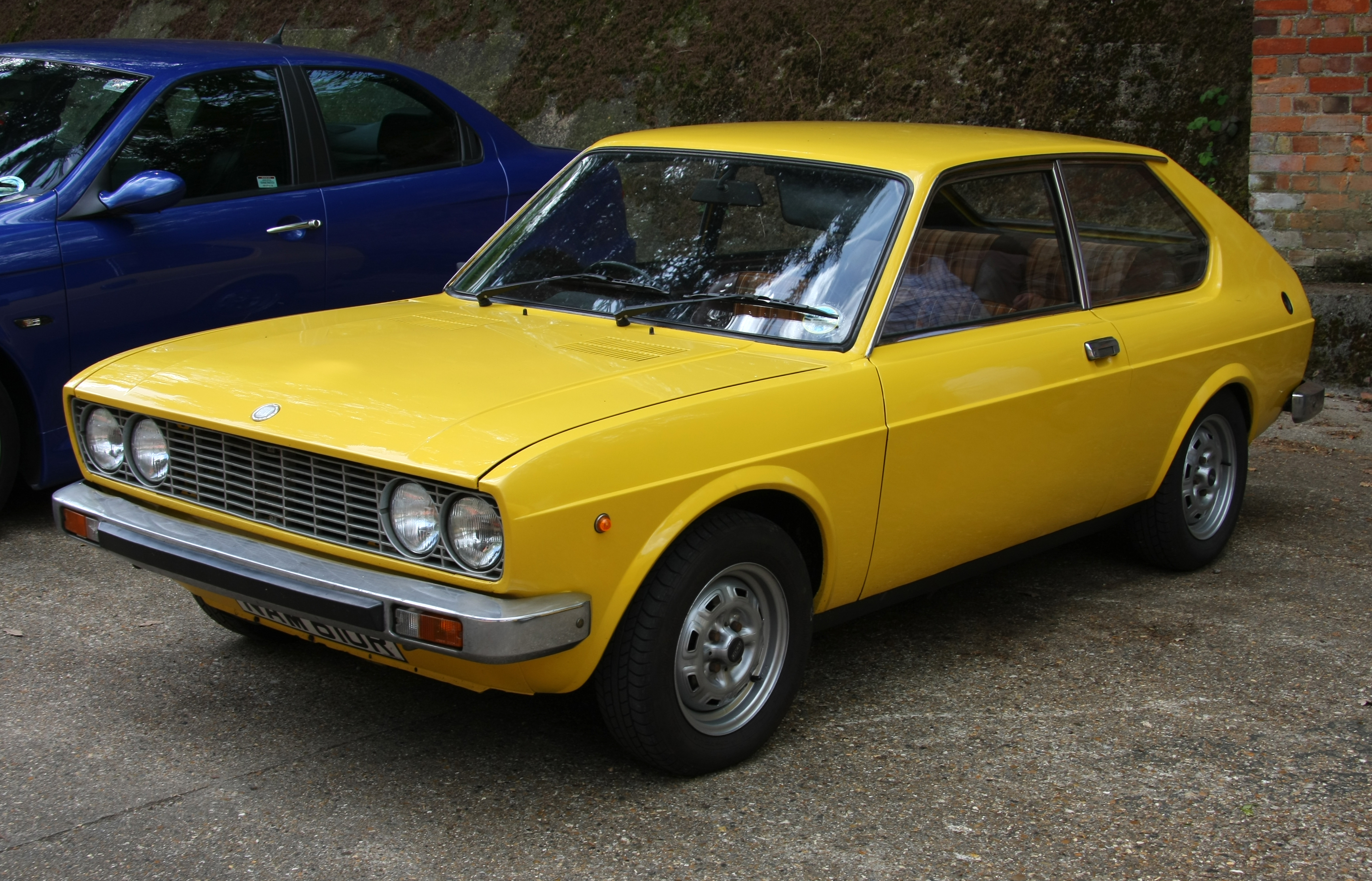
Fiat 128 3P "Berlinetta" (3-door coupé)

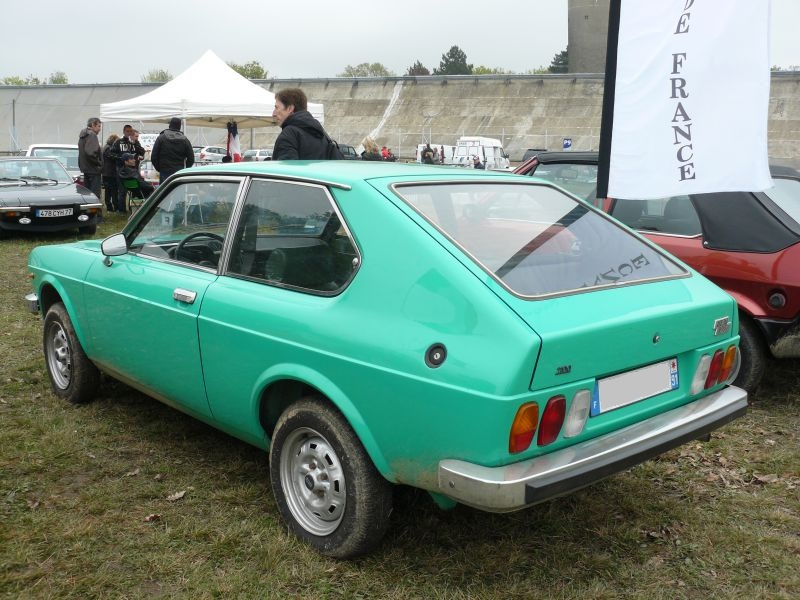
Fiat 128 3P (rear view)

The Coupé version was available with two different engines (1100 and 1300) and in two different trim levels (S and SL) for a total of four variants. In its base "S" trim, the coupé had single rectangular front headlamps, and wheels and hubcaps from the saloon. The pricier "SL" (for Sport Lusso) was distinguished by quadruple round headlamps, a specific grille, steel sport wheels without hubcaps, chromed window surround trim, door handles and fuel cap, and black decorative striping along the sills and across the tail panel. Inside it gained a leatherette-wrapped steering wheels, perforated leatherette upholstery, extended four-gauge instrumentation, loop pile carpeting and black headlining.

Suspension was the familiar all-independent 128 layout—save for the front anti-roll bar, which had been replaced by radius rods. The braking system consisted of discs at the front and drums at the rear; it was made more efficient by fitting smaller diameter front discs and the front and the vacuum servo first used on the 128 Rally.

The two engines were developed from the units found in the 128 saloon and 128 Rally respectively, and both were fitted with twin-choke carburettors and a two-piece exhaust manifold. The 1100 (1,116 cc) produces 64 PS DIN (47 kW; 63 hp) at 6,000 rpm and 81 N⋅m (60 lb⋅ft) at 3,800 rpm, while the 1300 (1,290 cc) produces 75 PS DIN (55 kW; 74 hp) at 6,600 rpm and 92 N⋅m (68 lb⋅ft) at 3,800 rpm. Top speed was over 150 and 160 km/h (93 and 99 mph) respectively.

The 128 Coupé was produced until 1975, but in latter years sales were dropping off considerably in favor of the mid-engined X1/9. Since Fiat had to pay a commission to Bertone for every X1/9, it was decided to provide some internal competition in the form of the updated hatchback coupé 128 3P Berlinetta. "3P" stands for Tre Porte, or "Three Doors" in Italian; it appeared in June 1975 and remained in production until 1980. Designed by Paolo Boano of Fiat Centro Stile, the 128 3P used the existing design back to the B-pillar, with some detail modifications to the grille and headlights.

Because of emissions regulations that became valid in October 1975, the 128 3P engines were changed. The 1100 engine now offered 65 PS DIN (48 kW; 64 hp) at 6,000 rpm and 87 N⋅m (64 lb⋅ft) at 4,100 rpm. For the 1300 engine, output was now 73 PS DIN (54 kW; 72 hp) at 6,600 rpm and 100 N⋅m (74 lb⋅ft) at 3,900 rpm.

The 128 3P was also assembled by SEAT in Spain as the SEAT 128. Spanish cars were fitted with engines from the 124.

== Licensed production ==
=== Argentina ===
In Argentina, the 128 was produced from 1971 to 1990 by Sevel Argentina as a four-door sedan or five-door wagon, the Fiat 128 Rural, the latter unique to Argentina. Several trims and versions were available, including the IAVA sport series. In 1983 the car received a facelift with new headlamps, tail lamps and front grille, which was marketed as the Fiat Super Europa.

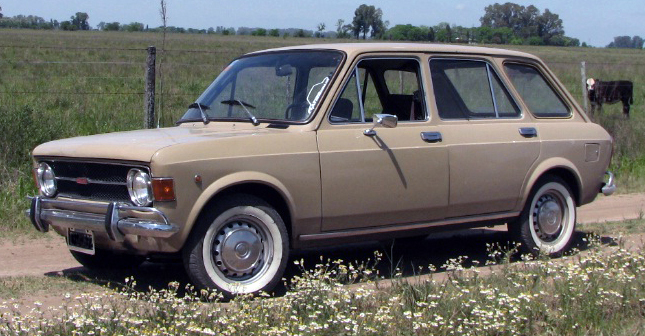
Fiat 128 Rural 5-door

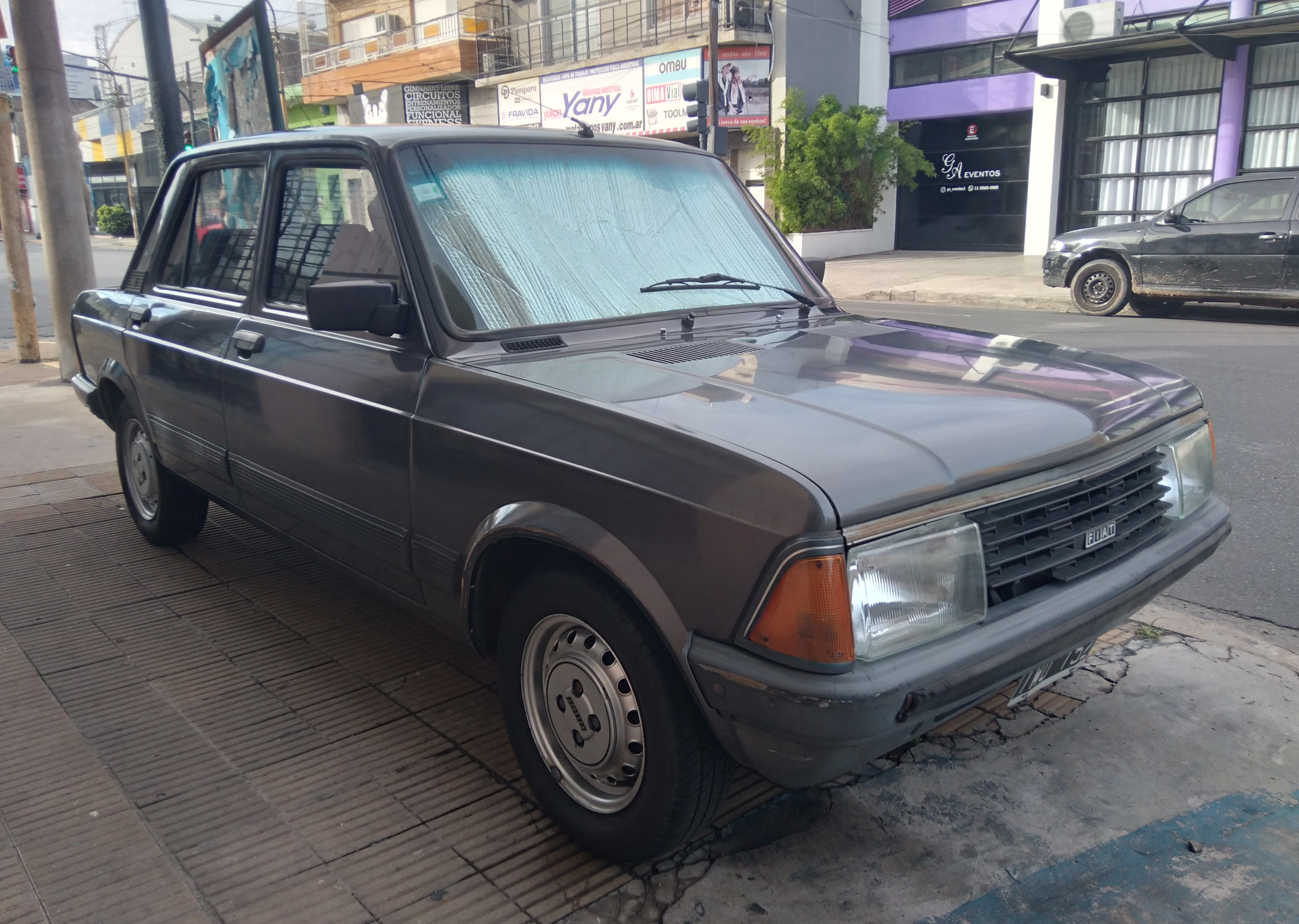
Fiat Super Europa

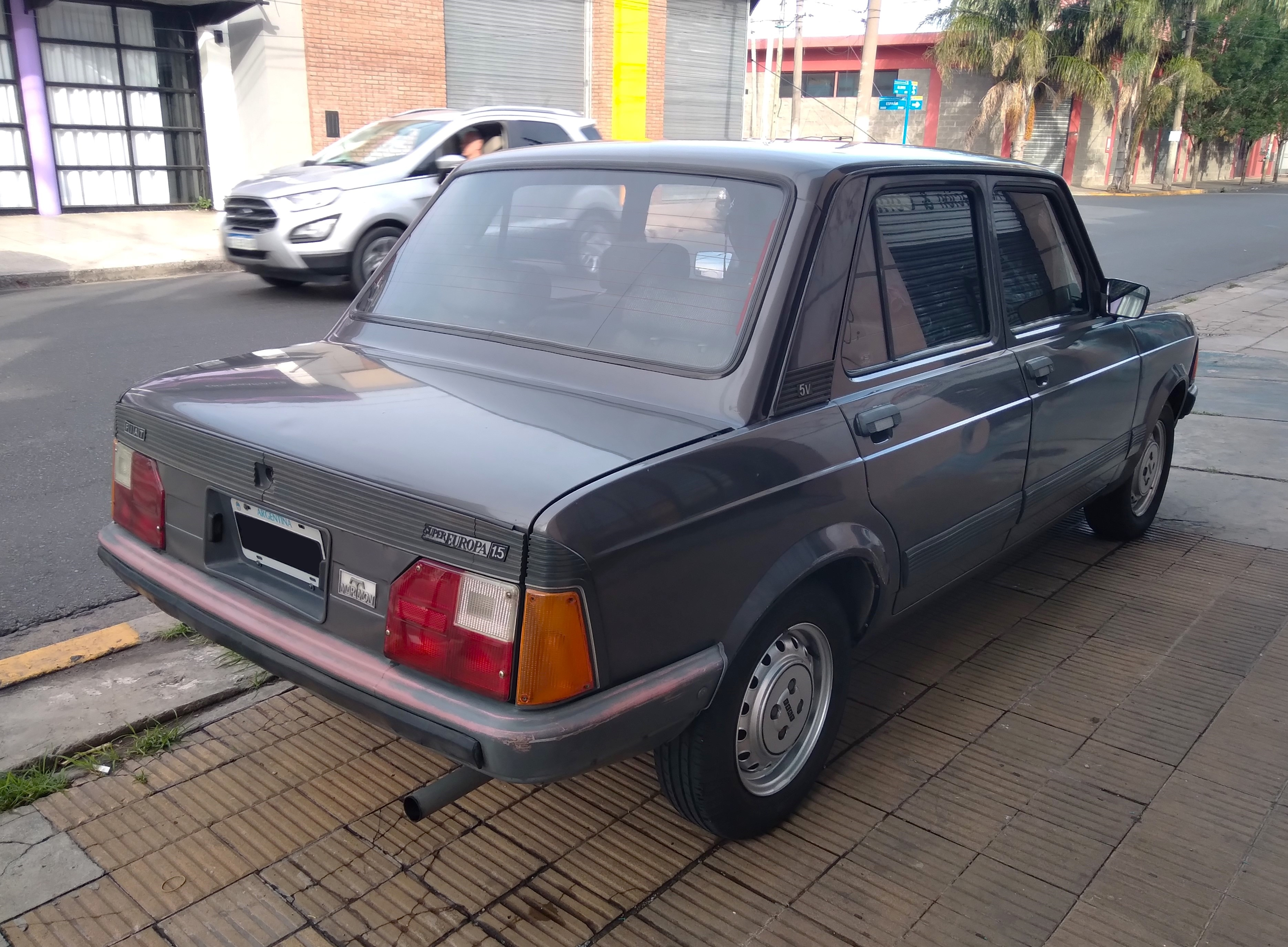
Fiat Super Europa (rear view)

=== Colombia ===
In Colombia, the Fiat 128 was produced by "Compañía Colombiana Automotriz" in Bogota between 1973 and 1980. It was only built as a 4-door sedan. Between 1973 and 1978, it was marketed as Fiat 128 L, with a 1.3-litre, 4-cylinder engine. Starting in 1978, a version with a 1.1-litre engine called the Fiat 128 San Remo was also offered.

=== Egypt ===
Until 2009, CKD kits from Zastava were manufactured by Egypt's Nasr car company as the Nasr 128.

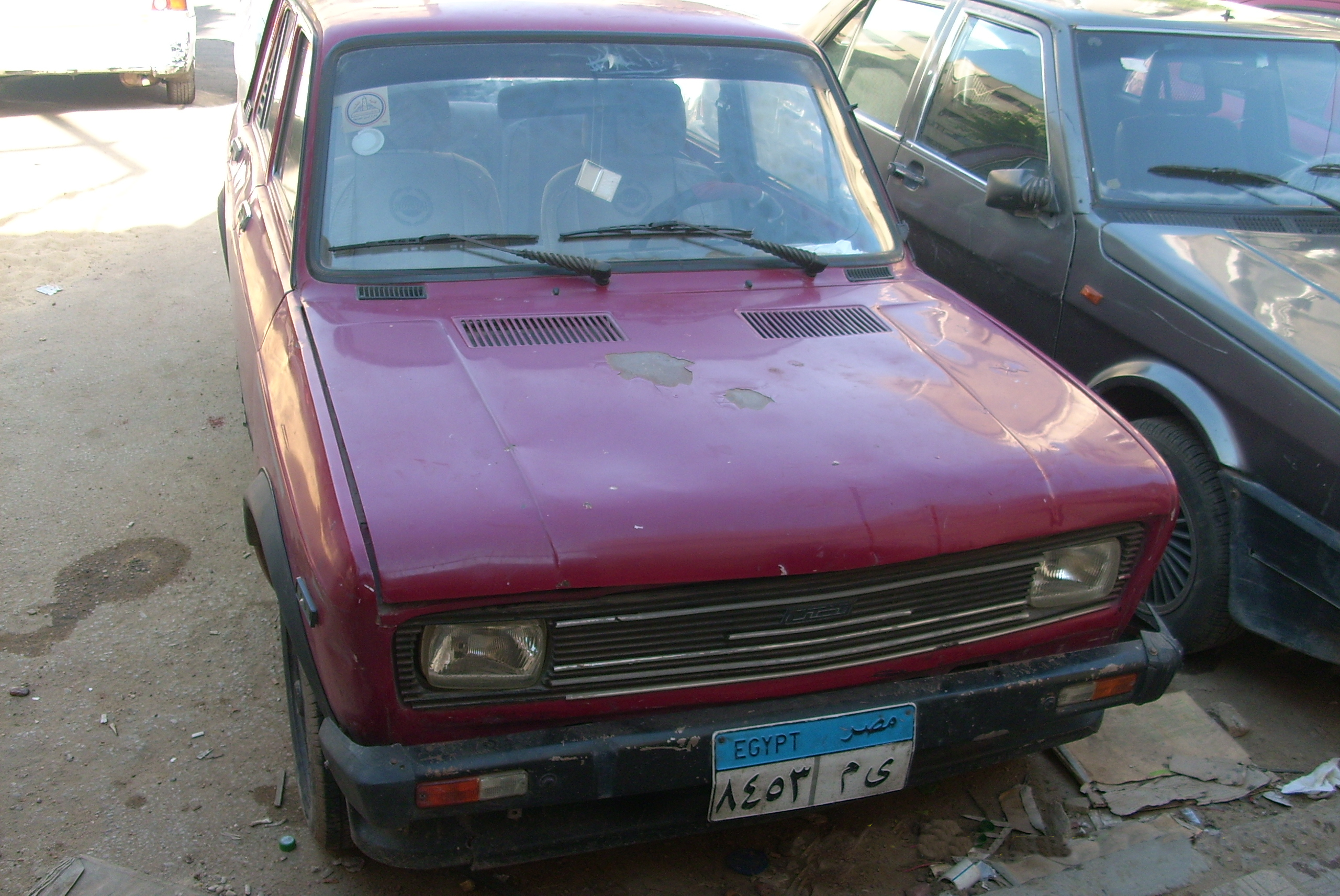
Nasr 128

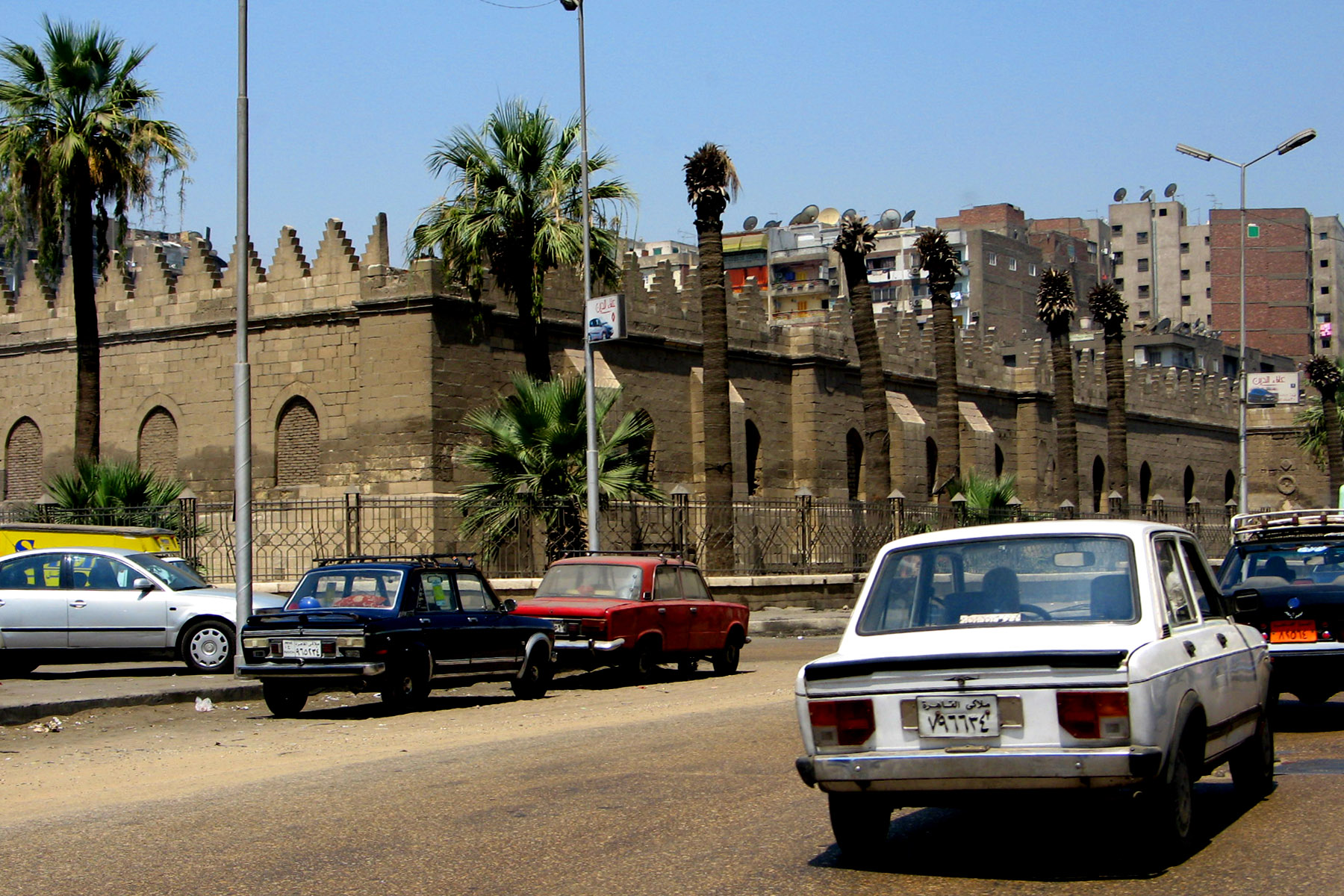
Two Nasr 128 in front of the Mosque of sultan al zahir baybars, El Cairo

=== Poland ===
The Yugoslavian hatchback variant of the 128, the Zastava 101, was assembled by FSO in Poland through CKD kits from Zastava and was marketed as the Zastava 1100p between 1973 and 1982. A total of 58541 cars were assembled in Poland.

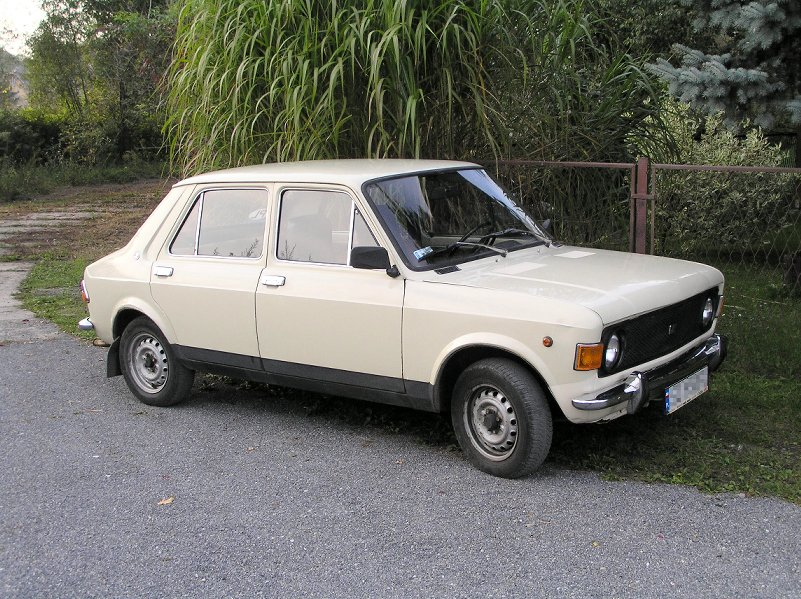
Zastava 1100p

=== Yugoslavia/Serbia ===
The 128 formed the basis of the Zastava 128 (four-door sedan) and Zastava 101 (three-door and five-door hatchbacks) ranges of cars manufactured by the "Zastava Automobili" company in Yugoslavia (later Serbia). The 128-based Zastavas were available throughout Europe in the '70s. In Britain, three variants were offered: a three-door hatchback (Zastava Yugo 311/313), four-door saloon (Zastava Yugo 411/413) and a five-door hatchback (Zastava Yugo 511/513). The car remained popular until the end of production and was the Yugoslav automaker's most affordable model.

Regular production ended in November 2008 after Fiat purchased the Zastava factory in Kragujevac, however production of the pick up variant Zastava Poly continued in very limited numbers at the Zastava Special Automobiles factory (156 cars built in the last year) until December 2010.

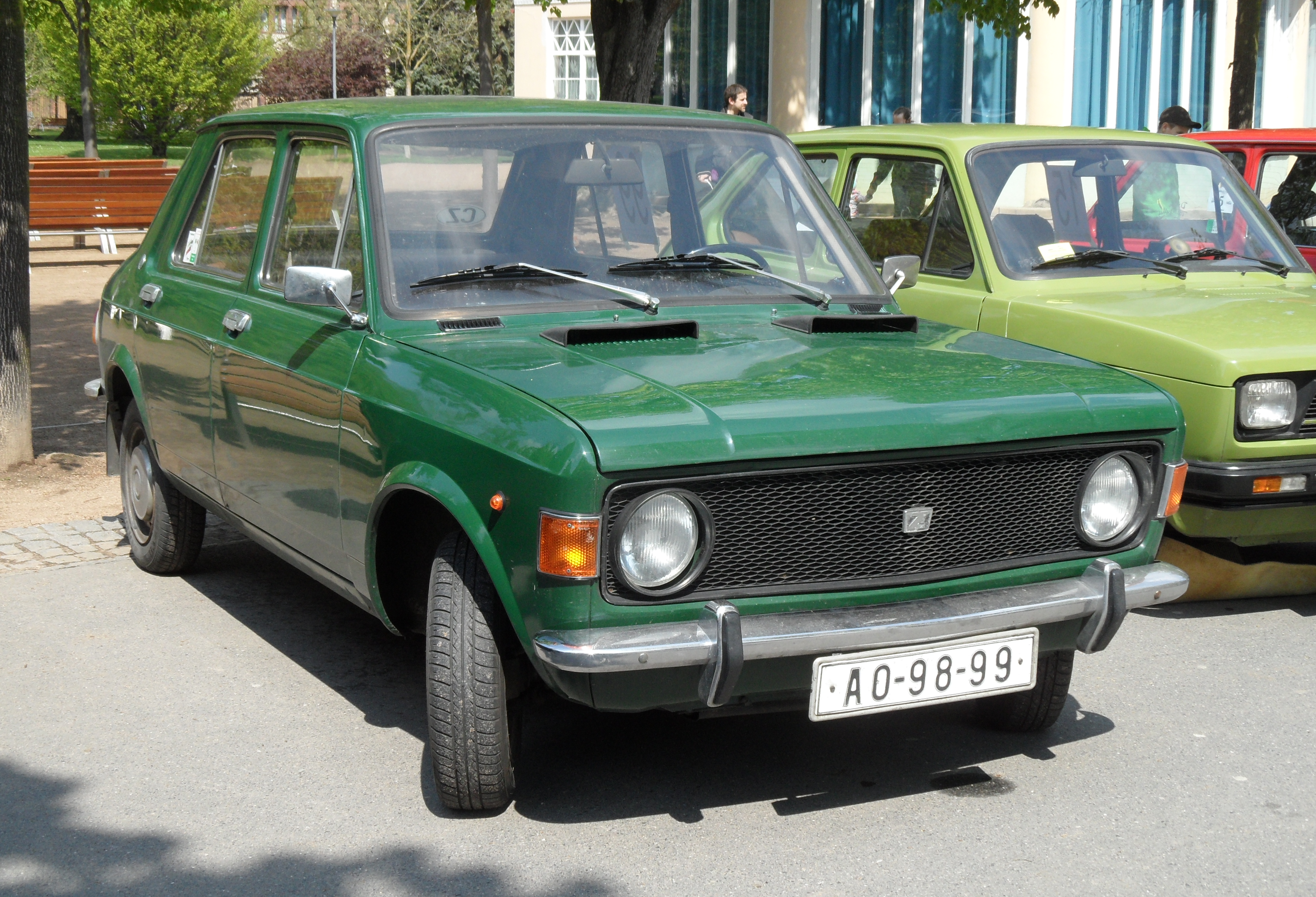
Zastava 101 (early model, front)

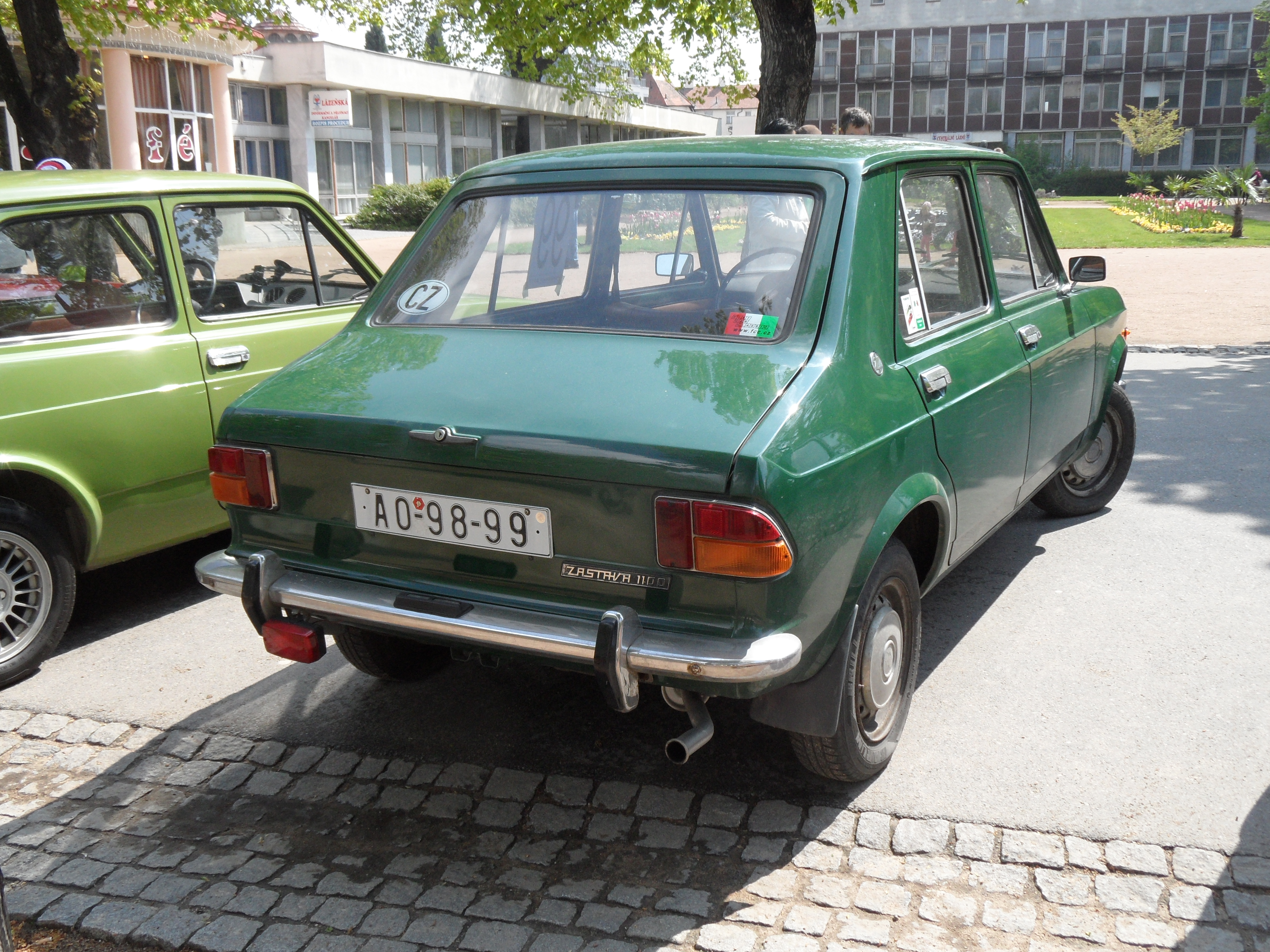
Zastava 101 (early model, rear)

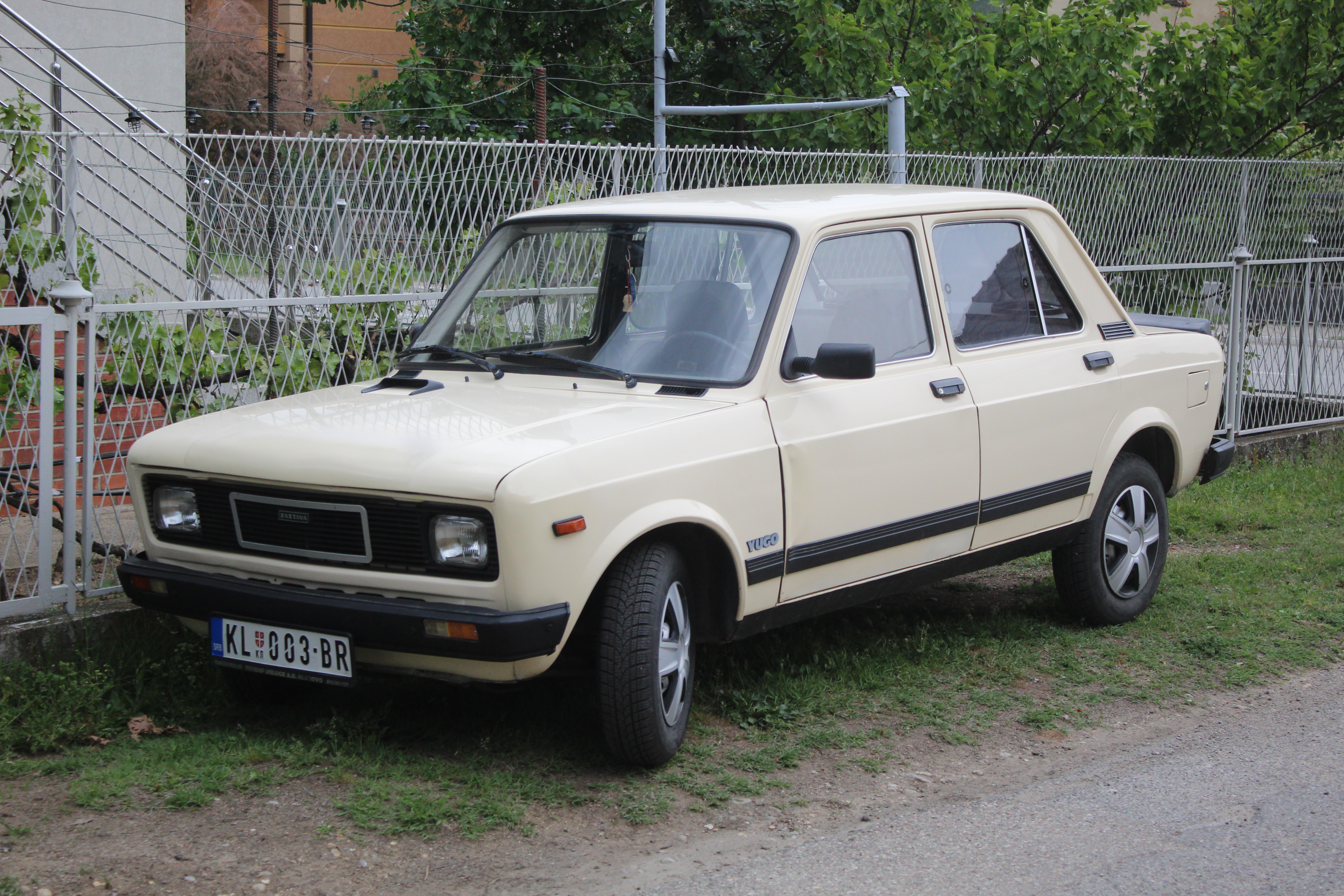
Zastava 128 (later model, front)

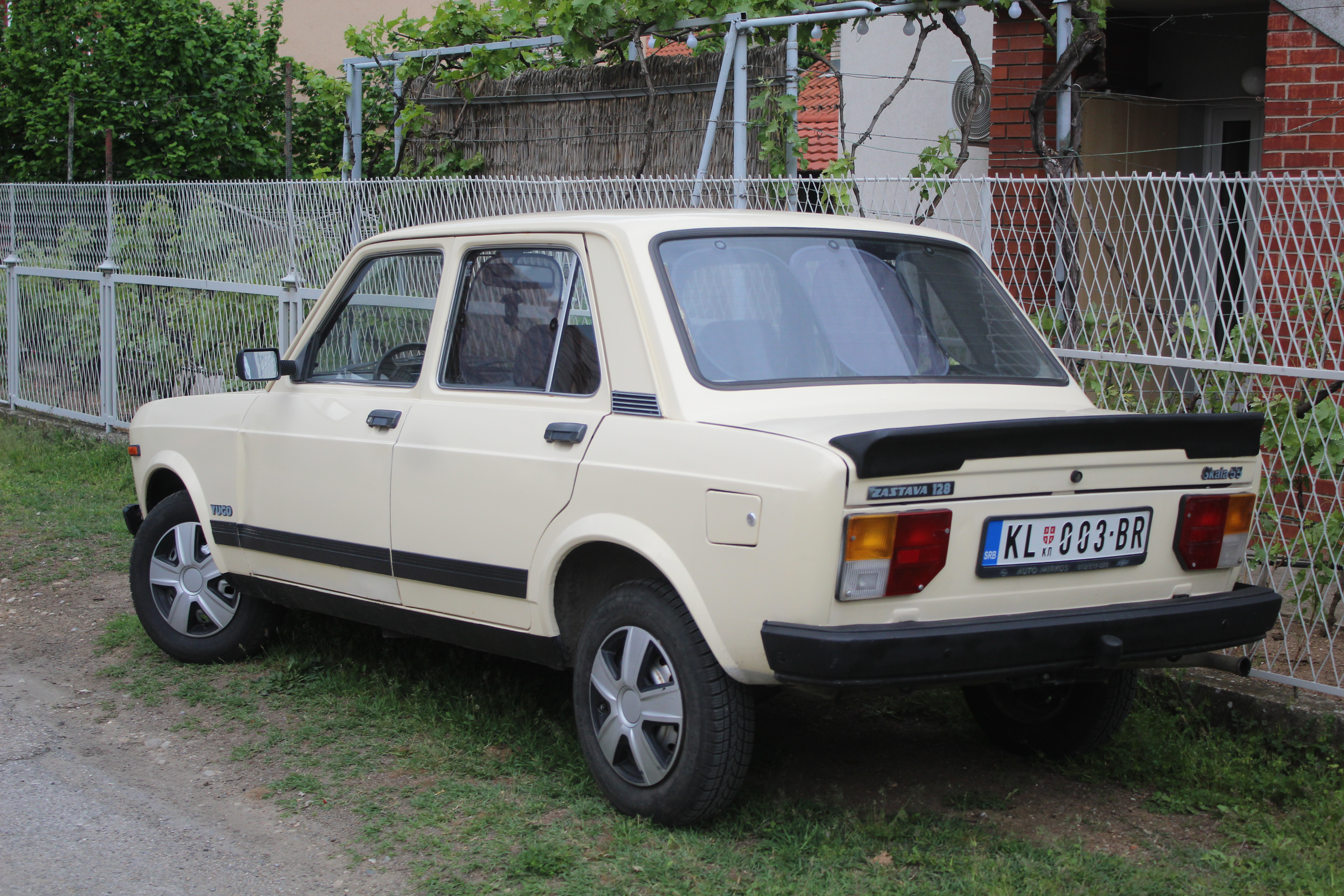
Zastava 128 (later model, rear)

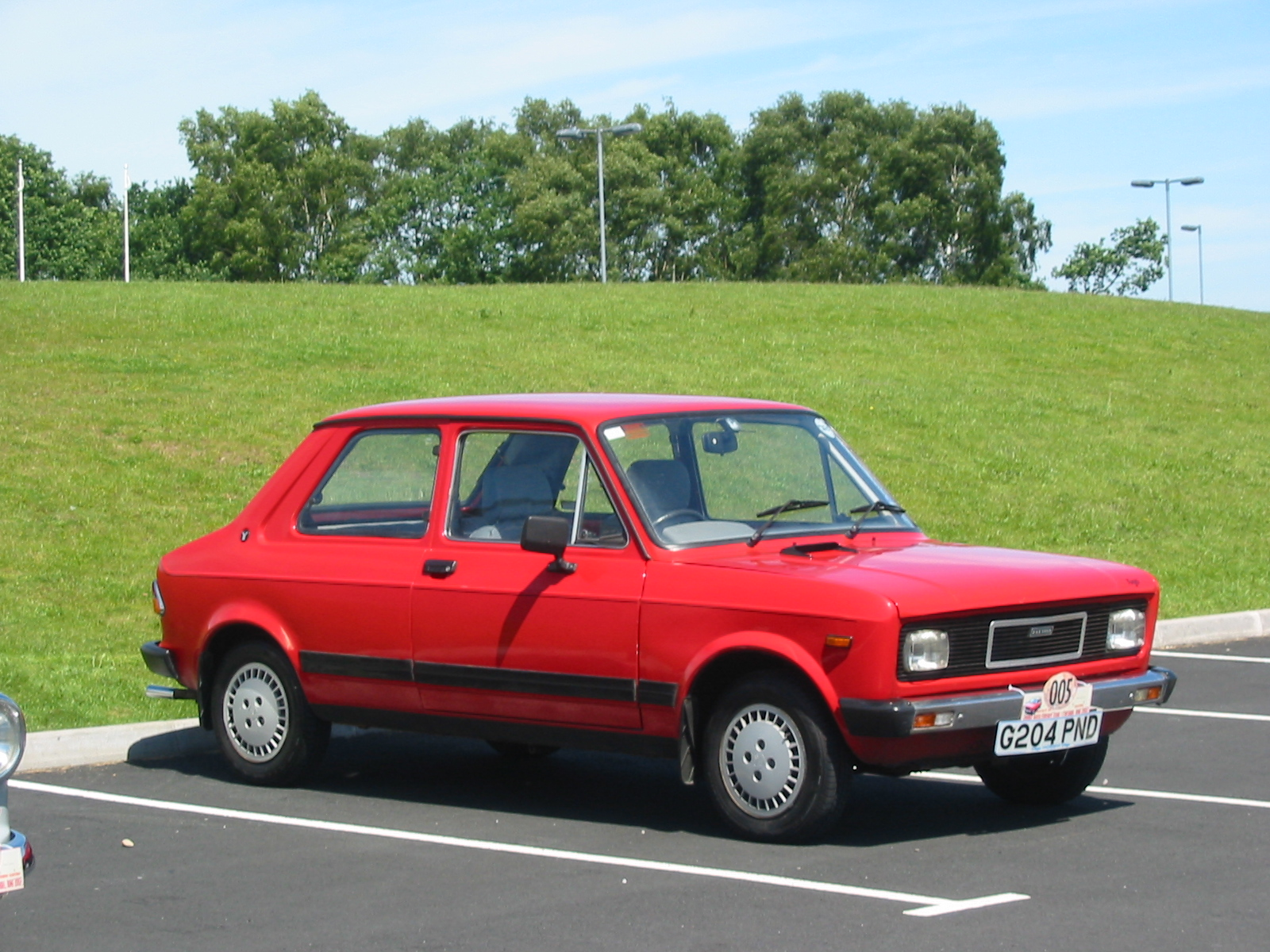
Zastava Yugo Skala 55 (known as 311/313 in the United Kingdom)

Zastava Skala Poly, made in Sombor

=== South Africa ===
The idea of a pickup version of the Fiat 128 first came to fruition on the recommendation of Fiat's local manufacturing operation in South Africa. The model was intended to be a "South Africa–only" model, but it soon inspired similar but distinct models overseas, like the Zastava variant in Yugoslavia. By Dr. Mario Barbieri's account, then managing director of Fiat South Africa, "Fiat South Africa put forward suggestions for the pick-up to Turin head-office, and development work began according to local specifications. The first prototype was ready in September 1977. During a recent visit to Italy, South African Fiat dealers examined this vehicle and contributed some ideas to its suitability for our market, such as a fuel tank capacity of over 50 litres."

The pickup was derived from the 128 station wagon and was rated for a payload of 500 kg (1,100 lb). As per dealer demands, the fuel tank was enlarged to 52 L (13.7 US gal).

=== Spain ===
In Spain, SEAT manufactured the 3P coupé as the SEAT 128 3P. It was available with two engine options from the 124 engine family, the 1.2-litre and the more powerful and well-known 1430 engine from the SEAT 1430. Was marketed as "Three Times SEAT" in order to underline its triple combination of sportiness, versatility, and design. The SEAT 128 never enjoyed great commercial success, however. 31,893 128s were made between 1976 and 1980.

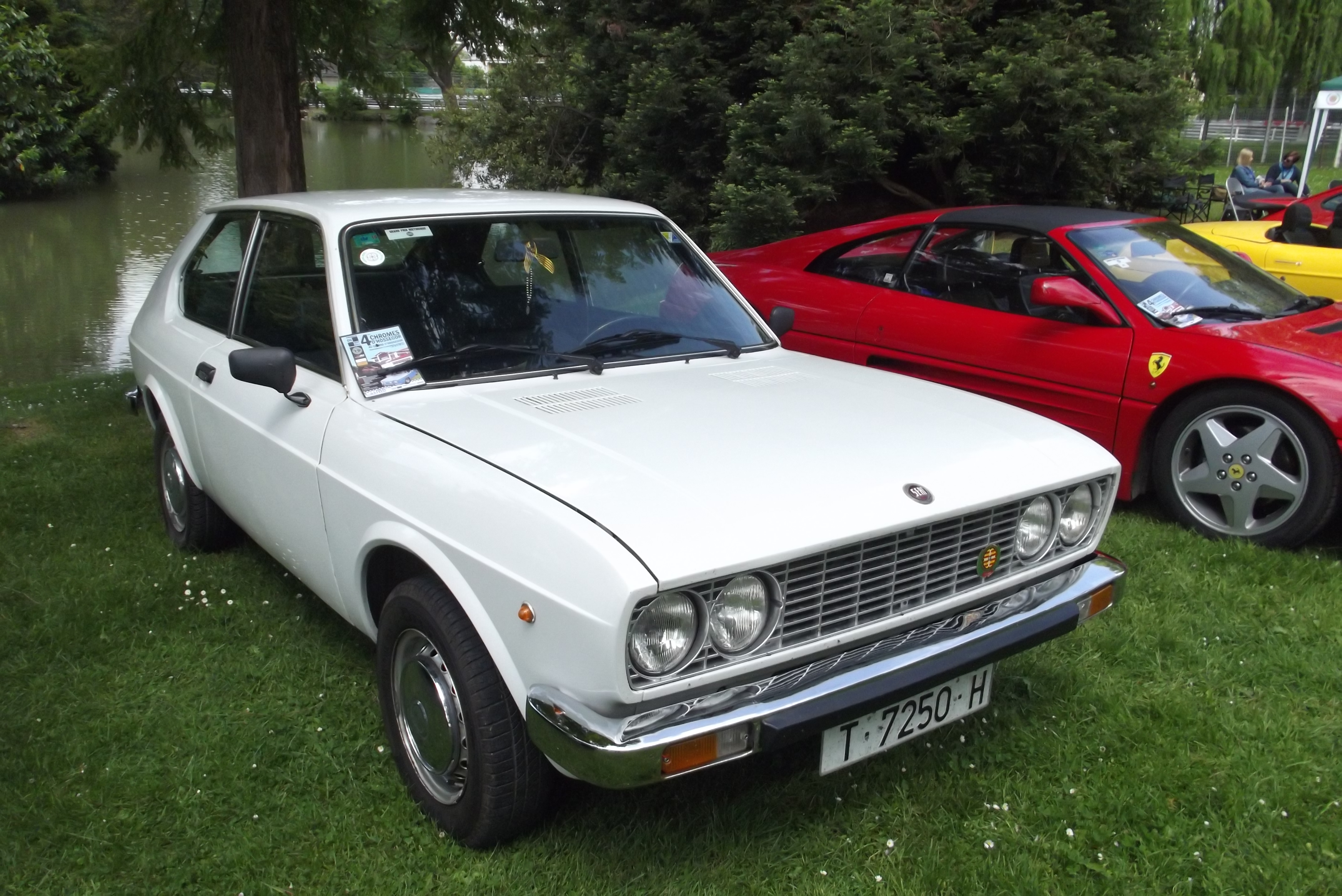
SEAT 128 3P

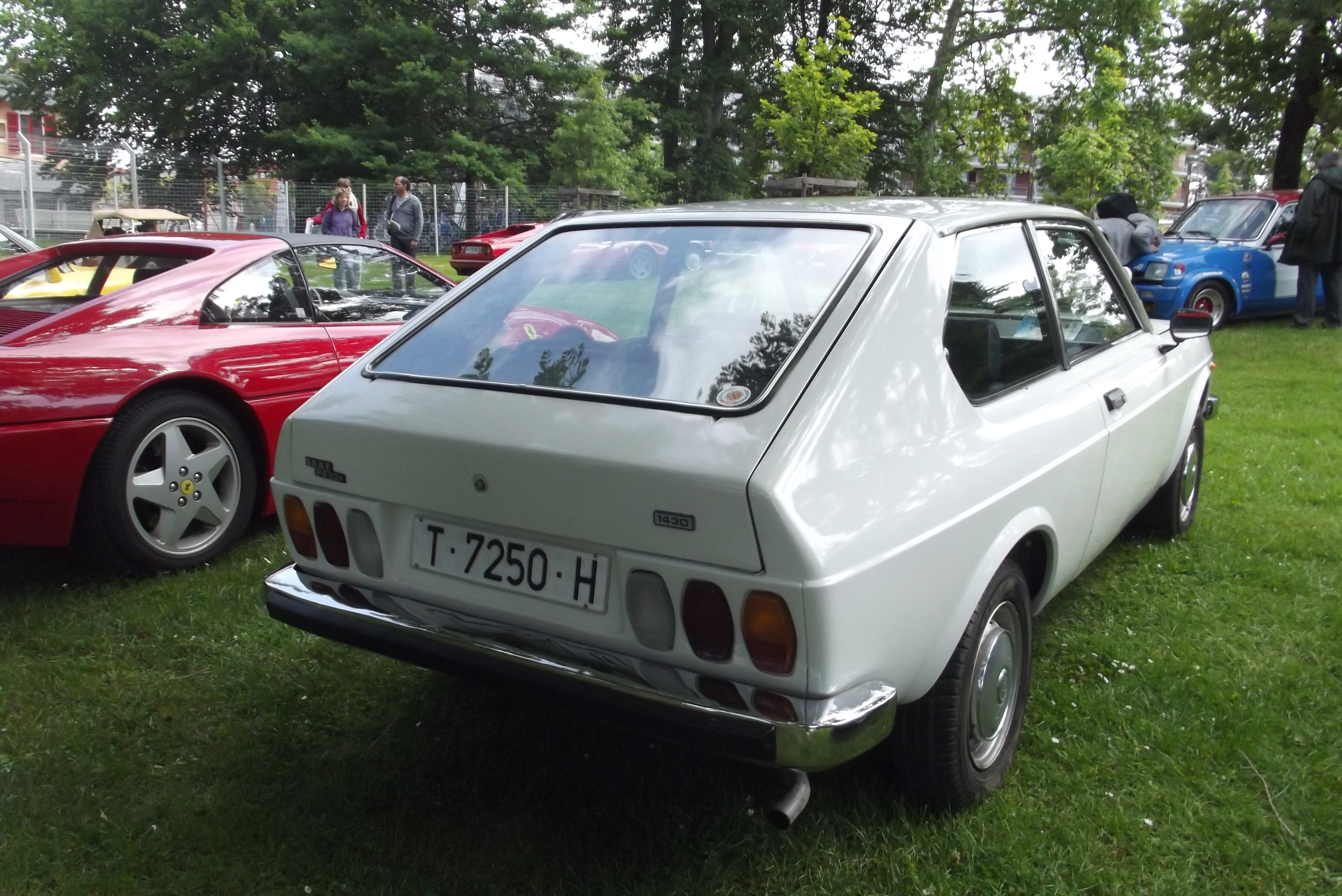
Rear view

=== Sri Lanka ===
In Sri Lanka, the Fiat 128 was manufactured by the Upali Motor Company until 1978. This car was commonly known as the Upali Fiat in Sri Lanka.

== Related models ==
=== Fiat X1/9 ===
The Fiat X1/9 is a two-seater mid-engined sports car designed by Bertone and manufactured by Fiat from 1972 to 1982 and subsequently by Bertone from 1982 to 1989.

Designed around the Fiat SOHC engine and transmission from the front wheel drive Fiat 128, the X1/9 relocated the transverse drive train and suspension assembly from the front of the 128 to the rear of the passenger cabin, directly in front of the rear axle, giving a mid-engined layout. With a transverse engine and gearbox in a mid-mounted, rear-wheel drive configuration, the X1/9 was noted for its balanced handling.

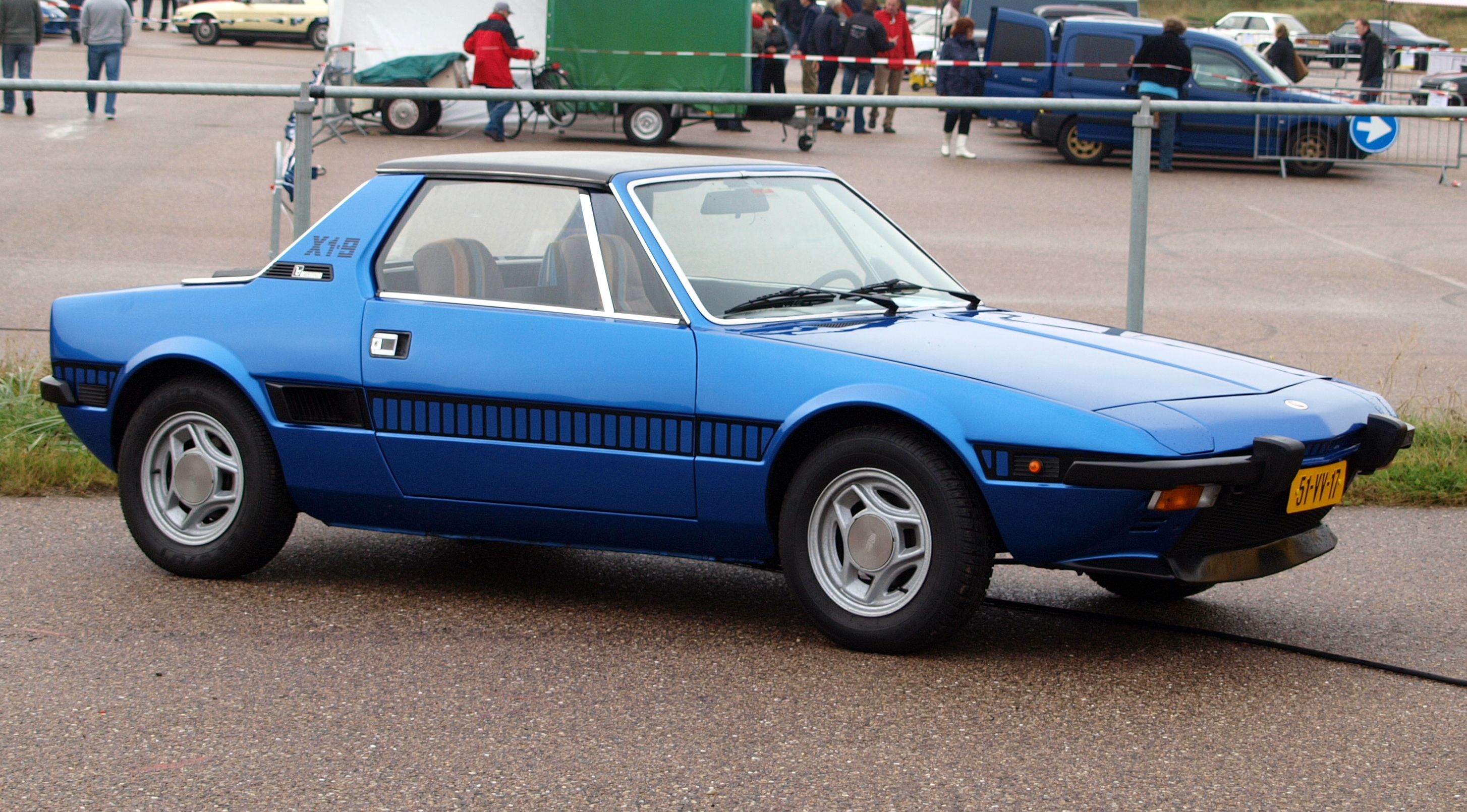
1978 Fiat X1/9 (Europe)

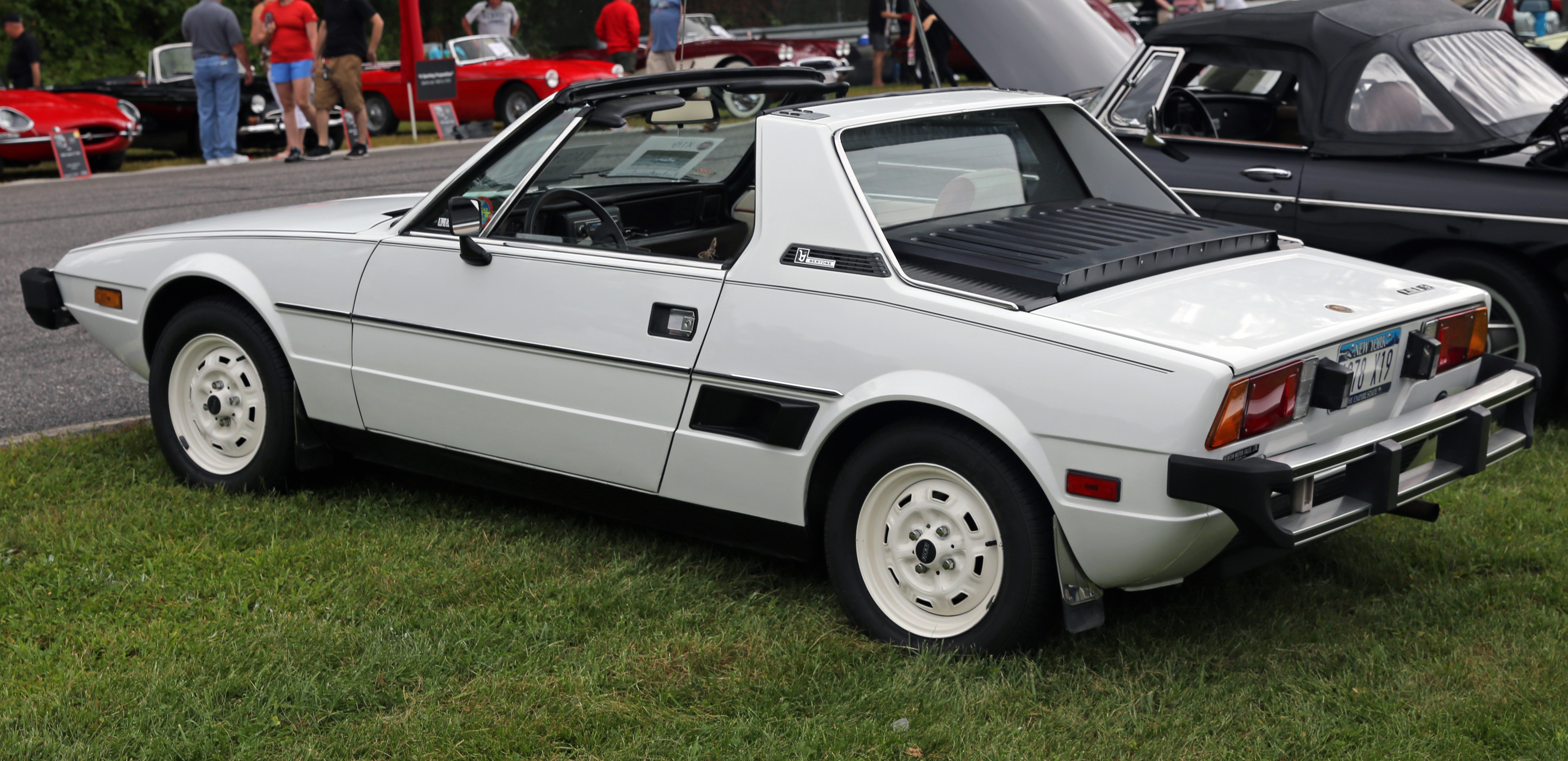
1978 Fiat X1/9 (US market)

=== Fiat ESV 2000 ===
The ESV 2000 is an Experimental Safety Vehicle that Fiat developed in 1972 based on its 128 model. It had a totally new 5-door hatchback design, with an extra strong passenger cell, but used the mechanicals of the standard 128 with the 1290-cc engine. The ESV 2000's weight was 360 kg (794 lb) higher than that of the original 128.

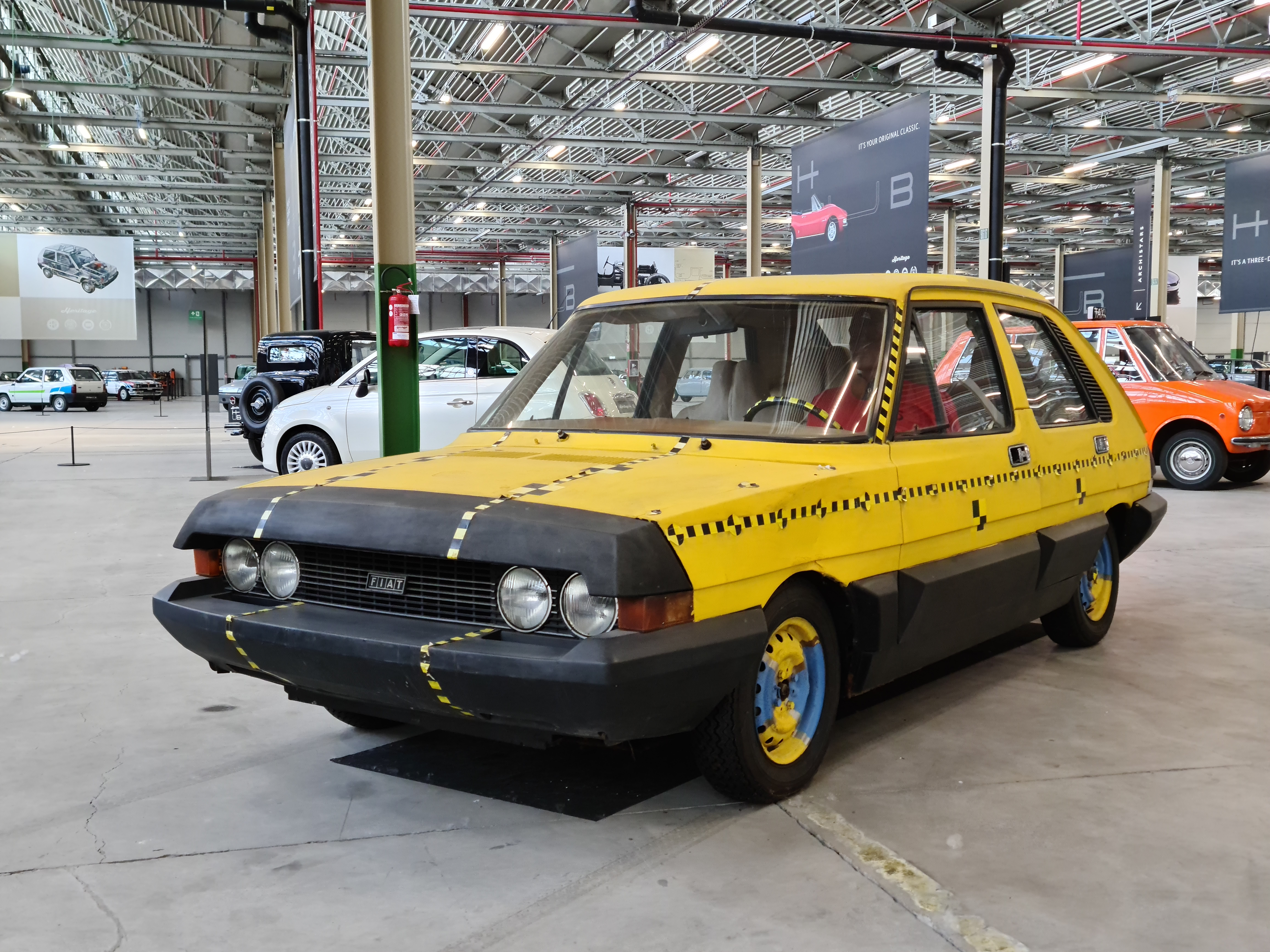
ESV 2000

=== Moretti 128 ===
The Moretti Motor Company of Turin, Italy produced the Fiat 128-based Moretti 128 in coupé and cabriolet versions.

Built in the plants of via Monginevro in a semi-handmade way (these custom-built cars were not assembled in a chain) and in a very limited number (less than a hundred), it cost about 1,500,000 lire in 1969. The interior was very neat and could be customized with many accessories (sports steering wheel, electric windows, leather upholstery ...). In 1975, the two models underwent a slight restyling (new black bumpers, wider) and equipped with the 60 PS (44 kW), 1290 cc engine of the contemporary Special sedan.

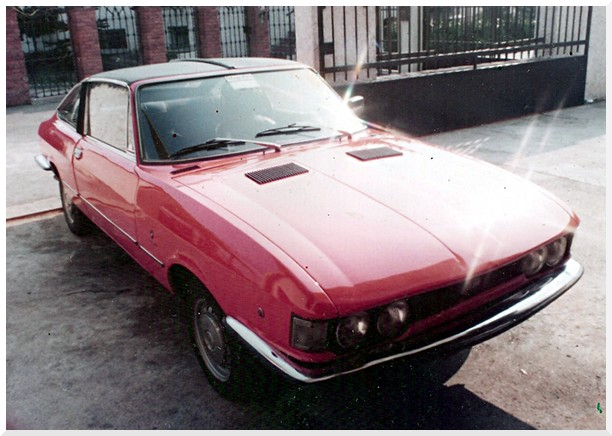
Moretti 128 Coupé

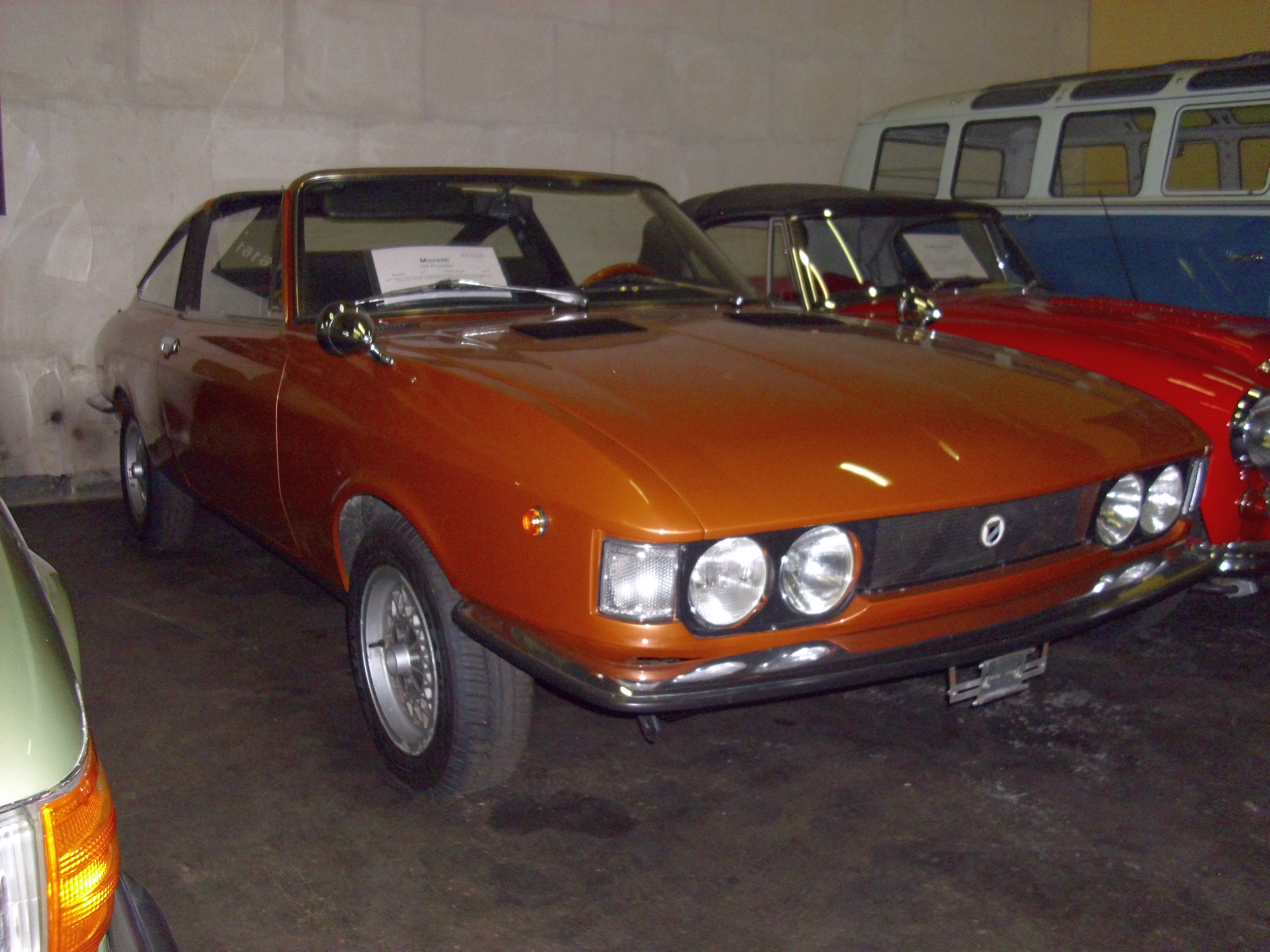
Moretti 128 Targa

=== Sears XDH-1 ===
Sears XDH-1 is an experimental electric car built for Sears, Roebuck and Company by their DieHard battery supplier Johnson Controls (Globe Union) in 1977 to celebrate the 10th anniversary of its DieHard brand of car batteries. The car was a Fiat 128 Coupé equipped with 20 DieHard (12-inch deep cycle marine) batteries, and an electric motor.
