= Divaina =

Sinhala language newspaper in Sri Lanka

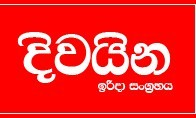
- Logo of Divaina
- Type: Daily newspaper
- Format: Print, online
- Owner: Upali Newspapers
- Founded: 1981
- Language: Sinhala
- Headquarters: 223, Bloemendhal Road, Colombo 13, Sri Lanka
- Circulation: 156,000 (Daily Divaina); 40,0000 (Sunday Divaina)
- Sister newspapers: The Island
- Website: divaina.com

Divaina (Sinhala: දිවයින) is a Sinhala language daily newspaper published by the Upali Newspapers in Sri Lanka. A sister newspaper of The Island, Divaina was established in 1981. Its Sunday edition is the Sunday Divaina. The daily newspaper currently has a circulation of 156,000 and its Sunday edition, 340,000 per issue. The paper was founded by Upali Wijewardene, and it takes a Sinhalese Buddhist nationalist editorial stance.

== See also ==
- List of newspapers in Sri Lanka
