= Navaliya =

- Categories: Women
- Frequency: Weekly
- Publisher: Upali Newspapers
- Founded: 1982
- First issue: August 1982
- Country: Sri Lanka
- Based in: Colombo
- Language: Sinhala
- Website: Navaliya website

Navaliya (English: New Woman) is a Sinhala language weekly for women. It is published in Colombo, Sri Lanka, by Upali Newspapers. It was established in August 1982.
