= List of Sri Lankan journalists =

The following is an alphabetical list of journalists from the Asian country of Sri Lanka.

== A–M ==
- Chathura Alwis
- M. H. M. Ashraff
- Iqbal Athas
- Nisthar Cassim
- Ernest Corea
- Premakeerthi de Alwis
- Harold de Andrado
- Edmund de Livera
- Mervyn de Silva
- Sampath Lakmal de Silva
- Armand de Souza
- Richard de Zoysa
- P. Devakumaran
- Prageeth Eknaligoda
- S. J. Emmanuel
- Basil Fernando
- Susitha R. Fernando
- Vijita Fernando
- Thevis Guruge
- Tim Horshington
- I. M. R. A. Iriyagolle
- Isaipriya
- Victor Ivan
- Balanadarajah Iyer
- K. Natesa Iyer
- Frederica Jansz
- Sirilal Kodikara
- Suresh and Ranjith Kumar
- Buddhika Kurukularatne
- Champika Liyanaarachchi
- Charles Ambrose Lorensz
- Ponniah Manikavasagam
- Mariathas Manojanraj
- S. P. Mylvaganam

== N–Z ==
- Aiyathurai Nadesan
- Manusha Nanayakkara
- Mylvaganam Nimalrajan
- Maunasami Parameswaree
- K. S. Raja
- Annalakshmi Rajadurai
- Selvarajah Rajivarnam
- Subramaniam Ramachandran
- Dushy Ranetunge
- Premil Ratnayake
- Elmo Rodrigopulle
- Relangi Selvarajah
- Seelaratna Senarath
- Thilak Senasinghe
- Regi Siriwardena
- Sinnathamby Sivamaharajah
- Taraki Sivaram
- Subramaniyam Sugirdharajan
- Chandrabose Suthaharan
- J. S. Tissainayagam
- Lal Wickrematunge
- Lasantha Wickrematunge
- Edwin Wijeyeratne

== See also ==
- List of Sri Lankan people
- List of Sri Lankan writers
- Lists of journalists
- Media of Sri Lanka
