= Freedom of the press in Sri Lanka =

Freedom of the press in Sri Lanka is guaranteed by Article 14(1)(a) of the Constitution of Sri Lanka which gives every citizen "the freedom of speech and expression including publication". But under some government's there was widespread suppression of the media, particularly those critical of those governments. Sri Lanka is ranked 146 out of 180 countries in Reporters Without Borders's Press Freedom Index for 2022

Freedom House has judged the Sri Lankan press to be Partly free.

== Introduction ==
Although the constitution guarantees free speech it places significant limits on the exercise of this right. Various laws and regulations, such as the Prevention of Terrorism Act 1979 brought in to deal with Tamil militants, have been used by successive governments to suppress freedom of expression. During the JVP insurgency of 1989 and the Sri Lankan civil war, many journalists were killed, assaulted or went missing. 25 journalists were killed between 1999 and 2011. Dozens fled abroad.

Much of the media in Sri Lanka is privately owned. Impunity for threats and violence against journalists and official censorship contributed to self-censorship by almost all media outlets.

The civil war ended in May 2009 and there was an origin of a safe place for journalists, but attacks on the media have reduced but journalists continue to be harassed and intimidated. In 2015, the new Government headed by UNP said that they will assure the Protection of freedom of Press, which had been reduced during the previous Rajapaksa government.

Reporters Without Borders reported in 2010 that, "of the world's democratically-elected governments, Sri Lanka's is the one that respects press freedom least."

== Assassinations of journalists ==
Thevis Guruge, chairman of the state-owned Independent Television Network, was killed on 23 July 1989. His murder had been believed done by Janatha Vimukthi Peramuna.

Premakeerthi de Alwis, a broadcaster for the state-owned Sri Lanka Rupavahini Corporation, was dragged from his house in Homagama and killed on the night of 31 July 1989. He was killed by Janatha Vimukthi Peramuna.

On the morning of 18 February 1990 Richard de Zoysa, a journalist for the Inter Press Service, was abducted by armed men from his home in Welikadawatte, Colombo. He was found dead the next morning on Koralawella beach in Moratuwa – he had been shot in the head and throat and his jaw broken. De Zoysa is believed to have been murdered by death squads set-up to kill JVP members and their supporters after exposing the killings of students by those death squads.

Rohana Kumara, editor of the Satana newspaper, was shot dead in Pangiriwatte, Colombo on 7 September 1999. The newspaper had been critical of the government and exposed personal and political scandals. Kumara had been harassed by successive governments. It is alleged that President Chandrika Kumaratunga shielded Kumara's murderers.

Atputharajah Nadarajah, editor of the Thinamurasu newspaper and EPDP Member of Parliament, was shot dead in Colombo on 2 November 1999. Thinamurasu is a newspaper published by the EPDP, a government backed paramilitary group. Nadarajah had criticised the EPDP in the newspaper and supported Tamil militants.

Indika Pathinivasan, a camera assistant for Maharaja Television Network, and Anura Priyantha a camera assistant for the state-owned Independent Television Network, were both killed by a suicide bombing at an election rally in Colombo on 18 December 1999. The bombing was aimed at President Chandrika Kumaratunga and is believed to have been the work of the LTTE.

Vasthian Anthony Mariyadas, a freelance radio reporter for the state-owned Sri Lanka Broadcasting Corporation, was shot dead outside St. Anthony's Church, Vavuniya on 31 December 1999. Vavuniya was inside government controlled territory.

Mylvaganam Nimalrajan, a journalist for the Virakesari newspaper, was shot dead at his home in Jaffna on 19 October 2000. Nimalrajan was one of the first journalists to write about the Chemmani mass graves and he exposed vote-rigging and intimidation by the Eelam People's Democratic Party (EPDP), a government backed paramilitary group, during the 2000 parliamentary election. Several EPDP members were arrested but no one has been brought to justice for Nimalrajan's murder due to interference by the government and the security forces.

Aiyathurai Nadesan, a journalist for the Virakesari newspaper, was shot dead in Batticaloa on 31 May 2004. Nadesan had written several articles criticising the government and paramilitary groups. The Karuna faction, a government backed paramilitary group, was blamed for Nadesan's murder.

Balanadarajah Iyer (a.k.a. Sinna Bala), who was on the editorial board of the Thinamurasu newspaper, was shot dead in Wellawatte, Colombo on 16 August 2004. Thinamurasu is a newspaper published by the EPDP, a government backed paramilitary group. It and its journalists had been attacked by the rebel Liberation Tigers of Tamil Eelam (LTTE) on several occasions. Iyer had criticised the LTTE's human rights abuses and had been threatened by the LTTE before his murder. The EPDP and others have blamed the LTTE for Iyer's murder.

Lanka Jayasundara, a photographer for Wijeya Publications, was killed by a grenade attack at a music concert in Colombo on 11 December 2004. The Temptation 2004 concert had been heavily criticised by Sinhala nationalists because they claimed it fell on the first anniversary of the death of Buddhist monk Gangodawila Soma Thero. The Sinhala nationalists, including members of the nationalist Jathika Hela Urumaya, launched a protest against the concert and much of their anger was aimed at individuals attending the concert.

On the night of 28 April 2005 Taraki Sivaram, an editor for the TamilNet news website, was abducted by four men in a white van in front of a restaurant metres from Bambalapitiya police station, Colombo. He was found dead the next morning in Himbulala inside a High Security Zone near the Parliament – he had been shot and beaten. Sivaram was a Tamil nationalist. He had also been critical of Colonel Karuna Amman's split from the LTTE. In 2000 a shadowy organisation had issued threats against Sivaram and other journalists, calling them traitors and spies. He had been branded a "terrorist journalist" by the nationalist Jathika Hela Urumaya. Sivaram's house had been raided by the police several times and pro-government media had accused him of being a spy for the LTTE. Sivaram had feared for his life, saying "My life is in serious danger". According to journalist D. B. S. Jeyaraj, Colonel Karuna may have personally murdered Sivaram. Arumugam Sri Skandharaja (a.k.a. Peter), member of People's Liberation Organisation of Tamil Eelam (PLOTE), a government backed paramilitary group, was arrested but the case against him was dropped. The case against Sri Skandharaja was later restarted and is currently postponed.

Relangi Selvarajah, a freelance journalist working for the state-owned Sri Lanka Rupavahini Corporation, and her husband Sinnadurai were shot dead in Bambalapitiya, Colombo on 12 August 2005. Relangi had hosted and produced programmes critical of the rebel LTTE at the behest of the EPDP, a government backed paramilitary group. She had been criticised by the LTTE several times for producing anti-LTTE programmes. Her husband was thought to have links with PLOTE, another government backed paramilitary group. The LTTE has been blamed for Relangi's murder.

Subramaniyam Sugirdharajan (Sugitharajah), a journalist for the Sudar Oli newspaper, was shot dead in Trincomalee near governor's secretariat on 24 January 2006. Sugirdharajan had provided photographic evidence to the media of the murder of five students by Sri Lankan security forces. The day before his death Sugirdharajan had written an article in the Sudar Oli exposing abuses committed by the EPDP, a government backed paramilitary group, in the Trincomalee area.

Suresh Kumar (B. G. Sahayathasan) and Ranjith Kumar, two employees of the Uthayan newspaper, were killed on 2 May 2006 when armed men burst into the newspaper's offices and opened fire indiscriminately. The attack followed the newspaper publishing a cartoon mocking Douglas Devananda, the leader of the EPDP, a government backed paramilitary group.

On the night of 1 July 2006 Sampath Lakmal de Silva, a freelance journalist working for Sathdina, received a telephone call at his parents' home in Boralesgamuwa, Colombo from a person called "Kumara" (believed to be Army Corporals Warnakumara and Wijeyakumara). After leaving home he was abducted and the next day he was found dead in Dehiwela – he had been shot three times in the head and once in the chest. De Silva had written several articles critical of all sides, including corruption in the military intelligence unit and financial irregularities and internal disputes in the Janatha Vimukthi Peramuna and Jathika Hela Urumaya. De Silva was also believed to be in possession of information linking police officers to several murders in Colombo and Avissawella. According to Srilal Priyantha, deputy editor of Sathdina, de Silva had been abducted and tortured by army personnel in October 2005 after he had written an article about the financial corruption of the military intelligence unit. Several people, including military personnel, were questioned about de Silva's murder but no action was taken against them.

S. Sivamaharajah, publisher of the Namathu Eelanadu newspaper, was shot dead at his house in Tellippalai on 20 August 2006. Namathu Eelanadu was considered to be pro-LTTE and Sivamaharajah was a member of the Tamil National Alliance, a political alliance with links to the LTTE. Sivamaharajah's house was inside the Valikamam North High Security Zone controlled by the Sri Lankan military and there was a curfew at the time of the murder.

Chandrabose Suthaharan (Subash Chandraboas), editor of the Nilam magazine, was shot dead at his home in Thirunavatkulam near Vavuniya on 16 April 2007. His home was inside government controlled territory and his murderers spoke both Tamil and Sinhala.

Selvarajah Rajivarnam, a journalist for the Uthayan newspaper, was shot dead in Jaffna close to a military checkpoint on 29 April 2007. The EPDP, a government backed paramilitary group, was blamed for Rajivarnam's murder.

Sahadevan Nilakshan (Sahathevan Deluxshan), editor of the student-run Chaalaram magazine, was shot dead outside his house in Kokkuvil on 1 August 2007. The killing occurred inside an area controlled by the Sri Lankan military and there was a curfew at the time of the murder.

Isaivizhi Chempiyan (Subajini), a broadcaster on the Voice of Tigers radio station, and technicians Suresh Linbiyo and T. Tharmalingam were killed when the Sri Lanka Air Force dropped dozens of bombs on the station in Thiruvaiaru near Kilinochchi on 27 November 2007. The bombing occurred shortly before the station was to broadcast LTTE leader Velupillai Prabhakaran's annual policy address.

P. Devakumaran, a journalist for News First, was hacked to death in Navanthurai near Jaffna on 28 May 2008. Devakumaran is believed to have been murdered by the LTTE after criticising the LTTE in his reports.

Rashmi Mohamed, a journalist for Sirasa TV, was killed by a suicide bombing at the opening of a new United National Party office in Anuradhapura on 6 October 2008. The bombing was aimed at Major General Janaka Perera and it was a work of the LTTE.

Lasantha Wickrematunge, editor of The Sunday Leader newspaper was shot dead on 8 January 2009 in Colombo. Three days later an editorial appeared in The Sunday Leader written by Wickrematunge before his death in which he predicted his own murder, stating "it will be the government that kills me". Wickrematunge and his newspaper had been highly critical of the government and he had been attacked before. He had been assaulted twice before and his house had been sprayed with machine-gun fire. A number of people including seventeen army personnel were arrested in relation to Wickrematunge's murder but later released. To date no one has been brought to justice for Wickrematunge's murder.

== Press Freedom Index ==
Sri Lanka's score (index) and rank in the annual Press Freedom Index produced by Reporters Without Borders:

Year	Index	Rank
2002	15.75	51
2003	24.83	89
2004	36.50	109
2005	33.25	115
2006	50.75	141
2007	67.50	156
2008	78.00	165
2009	75.00	162
2010	62.50	158
2011/12	87.50	163
2013	56.59	162
2014	59.13	165
