= Selvarajah Rajivarnam =

Tamil journalist of Sri Lanka

- Born: 1982; Jaffna, Sri Lanka
- Died: April 29, 2007, age 25; Jaffna
- Occupations: Journalist, Crime reporter

Selvarajah Rajivarnam (1982 – April 29, 2007) was a young minority Sri Lankan Tamil journalist from Jaffna, Sri Lanka. He was shot and killed by unknown assailants as part of the ongoing Sri Lankan civil war close to his place of work. Assailants came on a motorbike and shot him at close range.

He was a crime reporter working for the locally based Uthayan newspaper. His murder was the third in a series of murders of minority Tamil journalists to fall on an April 29.

== Incident ==
On April 29, 2007, Rajivarnam was riding his bicycle in the northern city of Jaffna. He was shot to death by assailants riding a motor bike. He was killed close to the offices of Uthayan, the daily that had employed him for the previous six months. It was not known whether he was going to or going away from his place of work when he was killed.

=== Series of murders ===
He was killed on the anniversary of two other murders of minority Tamil journalists in Sri Lanka. He died on the first anniversary of the murder of two other Uthayan journalists and he also died on the second anniversary of the murder of Tamilnet.com editor Sivaram Dharmeratnam.

Based on this coincidence of events, Reporters sans frontières in a report was quoted as saying:

”The people who murder journalists in Sri Lanka feel so well protected that they carry out fresh murders to mark the anniversaries of their preceding”.

== Career background ==
The 25-year-old journalist had been a reporter with Uthayan for the six months prior to his death, covering the crime beat. His job often took him to the police stations and hospital seeking information on the increasingly many murders and disappearances that had taken place in the recent past in Jaffna. He had also been taking an evening journalism course at Jaffna University.

Before joining Uthayan, Rajivarnam had worked for three years for the newspaper Namathu Eelanadu, whose managing editor, Sinnathamby Sivamaharajah, was murdered in August 2006, and for the daily Yarl Thinakural, one of whose journalists, Subramaniam Ramachandran, has been missing since February 2007.

Rajivarnam was killed in an area secured by the Sri Lankan Army. According to Reporters Without Borders, Jaffna journalists allege that a local paramilitary group known as the EPDP was involved in his murder as well as those of two other journalists from the same daily one year ago. the EPDP denied these allegations.

== Reactions ==
His murder was condemned by the media and by Human Rights organizations in Sri Lanka and around the world.

”We urge the Sri Lankan government to bring the killers to justice,”

South Asia Media Commission Chairperson Narasimhan Ram and Secretary General Najam Sethi said in a statement.

“Sri Lanka’s civil conflict cannot be used as an excuse to allow such deaths to occur with impunity,”

said the statement issued by SAMC Regional Coordinator Husain Naqi .

== Notes ==
- Extra Judicial killing: Sri Lankans have suffered a spate of extrajudicial killings since the beginning of the civil war. The UN and other international bodies have expressed grave concern over the spate of extrajudicial killings in Sri Lanka.
