= LankaeNews =

News website

LankaeNews.com
- Website type: Online Newspaper
- Available in: English, Sinhala, Tamil
- Editor: Athula Athulathmudali
- Website: www.lankaenews.com
- Current status: Active

LankaeNews.com is a Sri Lankan online News website that provides news and feature articles on current affairs in Sri Lanka. It is known and has been targeted for its independent reporting.

== Attacks and threats ==
LankaeNews.com was banned for several years under the Government of Mahinda Rajapaksa. Its office was set on fire in an arson attack in 2011 and its Editor Bennett Rupasinghe told BBC that he suspected the government’s hand in the crime as LankaeNews had written several articles critical of the Sri Lankan government. Later Bennett Rupasinghe was arrested. Earlier its previous editor, Sandaruwan Senadheera had to flee Sri Lanka after threats. It came under international limelight in 2010 when its correspondent Prageeth Eknaligoda disappeared while he was investigating the alleged use of chemical weapons by the Sri Lankan Army against Tamil rebels. The website was banned in November 2017 after it published news reports about alleged corruption in office of the President Maithripala Sirisena and other critical reporting of the government. The ban has been criticised by media organisations including Committee to Protect Journalists and Free Media Movement

== See also ==
- Freedom of the press in Sri Lanka
