= Disappearance of Subramaniam Ramachandran =

Disappearance of Sri Lankan journalist

Subramaniam Ramachandran
- Disappeared: Jaffna, Sri Lanka
- Status: Missing for 19 years, 1 month and 27 days
- Occupation: Journalist
- Employer(s): Yarl Thinakural and Valampuri

Subramaniam Ramachandran is a minority Sri Lankan Tamil journalist for the Tamil newspaper Yarl Thinakural and Valampuri. He also ran a private school. He has been missing since he was arrested in Vadamarachchi north of Jaffna. He was 37 years old. Eyewitness claimed that he was held in a Sri Lankan Army camp. Furthermore, Reporters Without Borders claimed that they are beyond any doubt that the Sri Lankan Army was involved in his disappearances. International Federation of Journalists lists his case in its campaign "Without a Trace" amongst the top 10 cases of enforced disappearances of media workers which still remains untraced in Asia Pacific.

== Background ==
This incident is part of acts of violence and intimidation against journalists and human rights activists taking place in areas controlled by the Sri Lankan government. Free Media Movement an International Federation of Journalists associate reported that newspapers like Sudor Oli and Thinakkural have received threats from government aligned para-military groups demanding that their distribution be stopped and there were attempts to unofficially censure Tamil media organizations His disappearance is part of a series of disappearances of Tamils in Jaffna which is under Army control. Ramachandran had written an article about illegal sand trafficking which included the license numbers of the vehicles involved and the businessman's connections with certain officers. Ramachandran was also threatened by the Tamil Tigers in the past for having good relations with members of the security forces. The LTTE intelligence services are said to have investigated him in November 2006 after he took photos of a gathering organised in honour of its leader, Velupillai Prabhakaran.

== Incident ==
Subramaniam Ramachandran left the school he runs in Karaveddy along with a friend. When he arrived at the Kalikai Junction military camp he was stopped for questioning by the Sri Lankan Army soldiers. Subramaniam Ramachandran was taken inside the camp for questioning. However, his friend was allowed to leave. Further eyewitness stated that Eelam Peoples Democratic Party (EPDP) cadres arrived in the army camp along with army informers. Several Jaffna based journalists confirm that he was being held in an army camp.

== Reaction ==
The RSF appealed for his release.

We appeal to the authorities to take action to locate and Ramachandran and have him released,

the press freedom organization added.

The fact that the government publicly acknowledges the participation of the security forces in kidnapping and forced disappearance is very worrying, but at the same time gives us hope that Ramachandran is still alive.

== Personal life ==
Ramachandran known to be as a minority Sri Lankan Tamil journalist for the Tamil newspapers Yarl Thinakural and Valampuri. He also ran a private school. He has been missing since February 15, 2007 when he was arrested by Sri Lankan army in Vadamarachchi, north of Jaffna. He was 37 years old. Eyewitness claimed that he was held in a Sri Lankan Army camp. Furthermore, Reporters Without Borders claimed that they are beyond any doubt that the Sri Lankan Army was involved in his disappearances. His parents died in 2023.

== See also ==
- List of people who disappeared mysteriously (2000–present)
