= Champika =

Champika is a Sinhalese given name. Notable people with the name include:

- Champika Liyanaarachchi (fl. 2003), Sri Lankan journalist
- Champika Premadasa (born 1948), Sri Lankan politician
- Champika Ranawaka (born 1965), Sri Lankan electrical engineer
