= Democratic Tamil National Alliance =

Sri Lankan Tamil political alliance

Democratic Tamil National Alliance ஜனநாயக தமிழ் தேசிய கூட்டணி
- Abbreviation: DTNA
- Secretary-General: Velayutham Nallanadar
- Founded: 2008 (as the Tamil Democratic National Alliance); 13 January 2023 (as the Democratic Tamil National Alliance)
- Split from: Tamil National Alliance (2023)
- Headquarters: 16 Haig Road, Bambalapitiya, Colombo
- Ideology: Tamil nationalism
- Parliament: 1 / 225
- Provincial Councils: 0 / 455
- Local Government: 106 / 8,327

Election symbol
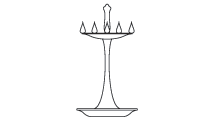
- Brass Lamp

The Democratic Tamil National Alliance (abbreviated DTNA; Tamil: ஜனநாயக தமிழ் தேசிய கூட்டணி, romanized: Jaṉanāyaka Tamiḻ Tēciya Kūṭṭaṇi), previously known as the Tamil Democratic National Alliance (abbreviated TDNA), is a political alliance in Sri Lanka that represents the country's Sri Lankan Tamil ethnic minority. The alliance is recognised by the Election Commission of Sri Lanka as registered political party with the brass lamp (kuthuvilakku) as its symbol.

== History ==
The Tamil Democratic National Alliance (TDNA) was formed in 2008 by the Democratic People's Liberation Front (Note: The Democratic People's Liberation Front is the political wing of the People's Liberation Organisation of Tamil Eelam (PLOTE).) (DPLF), the Eelam People's Revolutionary Liberation Front (Pathmanabha wing) (Note: Previously known as the Eelam People's Revolutionary Liberation Front (Varathar wing).) and the Tamil United Liberation Front to contest the 2008 Eastern Provincial Council elections. The TDNA secured 1.3% of the votes in the election, winning a single seat, R. Thurairatnam from the Batticaloa District.

Following the end of the Sri Lankan Civil War in 2009, the Sri Lankan Tamil diaspora began exerting pressure on Sri Lankan Tamil political parties to unite under a common front, thus the DPLF/PLOTE and the TULF joined the Tamil National Alliance (TNA), the largest political group representing Sri Lankan Tamils at the time. The EPRLF (Pathmanabha wing) led by T. Sritharan was not allowed to join the TNA due to opposition from the EPRLF (Suresh wing) led by Suresh Premachandran. The TDNA remained dormant thereafter.

In December 2022 the Illankai Tamil Arasu Kachchi, the main constituent party of the TNA, announced that it would contest the 2023 Sri Lankan local elections on its own. In response, the two remaining members of the TNA, the DPLF/PLOTE and the Tamil Eelam Liberation Organization, resurrected the TDNA, renaming it as the Democratic Tamil National Alliance (DTNA). The alliance was later joined by the Crusaders for Democracy, the EPRLF (Suresh) and the Tamil National Party. The DTNA is downplaying the "democratic" part of its name in a bid to suggest that it is the "real" TNA.

== Members ==
=== Current ===
Name	Leader	Parliament
Crusaders for Democracy	Sivanandan Navindra	0 / 225
Democratic People's Liberation Front (People's Liberation Organisation of Tamil Eelam)	D. Siddarthan	0 / 225
Eelam People's Revolutionary Liberation Front (Suresh)	Suresh Premachandran	0 / 225
Tamil Eelam Liberation Organization	Selvam Adaikalanathan	1 / 225
Tamil National Party	N. Srikantha	0 / 225

=== Former ===
Name	Leader
Eelam People's Revolutionary Liberation Front (Pathmanabha)	T. Sritharan
Tamil United Liberation Front	V. Anandasangaree

== Election results ==
=== Parliamentary ===
Election	Votes	Vote %	Seats won	+/–	Government
2024	65,382	0.59%	1 / 225	▼5	Opposition

=== Provincial ===
Election	Eastern Provincial Council						Northern Provincial Council						Nationwide				
Election	Votes	%	#	Seats	+/–	Government	Votes	%	#	Seats	+/–	Government	Votes	%	#	Seats	+/–
2008–09	7,714	1.30%	4th	1 / 37	—	Opposition	No election						7,714	0.09%	10th	1 / 417	New
