= Prageeth =

Prageeth is a given name. Notable people with the name include:

- Prageeth Eknaligoda (born 1960), Sri Lankan cartoonist
- Prageeth Rambukwella (born 1976), Sri Lankan cricketer.
