= Crusaders for Democracy =

Crusaders for Democracy is a Tamil political party led by Nadesapillai Vithyatharan a Journalist who was the Editor of the Uthayan and consists of former LTTE cadres. It was started the near the Nallur Kandaswamy temple where Thileepan fasted to death in a hunger strike against the IPKF. The party was started after the Tamil National Alliance refused to nominate them for political reasons. However, Crusaders for Democracy will contest as an independent group but will not campaign against the Tamil National Alliance and will contest only from Jaffna as it did not want to split Tamil votes in other areas.
