= Mariathas Manojanraj =

Mariathas Manojanraj <Ta>
- Died: 27 July 2006; Jaffna
- Occupation: Newspaper distributor for Thinakkural

Mariathas Manojanraj was a minority Sri Lankan Tamil distributor for the Tamil newspaper Thinakkural from Jaffna, Sri Lanka. He was killed by a mine which exploded when he went to collect newspapers for distribution on 27 July 2006 in Navakeeri near Jaffna.

== Background ==
Mariathas Manojanraj was part of a series of killing of Tamil media workers particularly those seen supporting the Tamil nationalist cause as the newspaper Thinakkural was seen to be doing. It was seen as part of the intimidation of Tamil media. Free Media Movement an International Federation of Journalists associate reported that newspapers like Sudor Oli and Thinakkural have received threats from anti-LTTE para-military groups demanding that their distribution be stopped and there were attempts to unofficially censure Tamil media organisations.

== Incident ==
Mariathas Manojanraj was killed while he was travelling by motorbike to collect newspapers by a mine blast. He had earlier registered at the Sri Lankan checkpoint. The Sri Lankan Army claims that he was a victim a mine meant for an Army Patrol however his relatives claim that the Tamil paramilitaries or the Sri Lankan is responsible for it .

== Government investigation ==
The international Press institute has called in for impartial government investigation.

== See also ==
- Sri Lankan civil war
- Human Rights in Sri Lanka
- Notable assassinations of the Sri Lankan Civil War
