= Rohana (name) =

Rohana is both a given name and a surname. Notable people with the name include:

- Rohana Bandara (born 1977), Sri Lankan politician
- Rohana Beddage (born 1935), Sri Lankan singer and actor
- Rohana Dissanayake, Sri Lankan politician
- Rohana Jalil (1955–2023), Malaysian singer
- Rohana Kumara, Sri Lankan journalist
- Rohana Muthalib (1900–1983), Indonesian beauty expert
- Rohana Pushpakumara, Sri Lankan politician
- Rohana Weerasinghe (born 1949), Sri Lankan musician
- Rohana Wijeweera (1943–1989), Sri Lankan political activist
- Rohana Yusuf (born 1956), Malaysian judge
- Anura Rohana (born 1973), Sri Lankan golfer
- Jayalal Rohana (1964–2021), Sri Lankan actor
- Sudath Rohana (born 1964), Sri Lankan filmmaker
- Vijitha Rohana (born 1965), Sri Lankan navy sailor
- Sanee Rohana Kodithuvakku (born 1961), Sri Lankan politician
