= Murasoli =

Murasoli may refer to:

- Murasoli Maran (1934–2003), Indian politician
- Murasoli (India), Indian newspaper
- Murasoli (Sri Lanka), Sri Lankan newspaper
- S. Murasoli, Indian politician
