= Senasinghe =

Senasinghe may refer to

- Sujeewa Senasinghe, Sri Lankan politician
- Thilak Senasinghe, Sri Lankan journalist
