= Sathasivam Baskaran =

- Died: August 15, 2006; Jaffna, Sri Lanka
- Occupation: Newspaper distributor for Uthayan

Sathasivam Baskaran was a minority Sri Lankan Tamil distributor for the Tamil newspaper Uthayan from Jaffna, Sri Lanka. He was shot and killed by unknown assailants on 15 August 2006 at Puthur junction near Atchchuveli while returning after delivering the paper after the curfew hours which are in force in Jaffna. He is fourth employee of the Uthayan newspaper to be killed.

== Background ==
Sathasivam Baskaran was part of a series of killing of Tamil media workers particularly those seen supporting the Tamil nationalist cause as the newspaper Uthayan was seen to be doing. It was seen as part of the intimidation of Tamil media. The office of Sudar Oli an associated newspaper with Uthayan was searched by the Sri Lankan army on the same day. Free Media Movement an International Federation of Journalists associate reported that newspapers like Sudor Oli and Thinakkural have received threats from anti-LTTE para-military groups demanding that their distribution be stopped and there were attempts to unofficially censure Tamil media organisations.

== Incident ==
Sathasivam Baskaran was killed during the relaxation of the strict curfew. Jaffna is under virtual martial raising questions as how assailants could kill him or a series of other journalists and escape. This led to accusations that the killing was carried out by Security forces or paramilitary allied with them.

== Reaction ==
The International Federation of Journalists (IFJ) has demanded an end to the continued and brutal targeting of Tamil media workers.

The IFJ President Christopher Warren said

““The IFJ is disgusted by the senseless killing of Baskaran, which is indicative of a disturbing trend of relentless targeting of the Tamil media. This latest murder raises further safety concerns for Tamil-language media workers in Sri Lanka, many of whom reportedly fear for their lives

== Government investigation ==
The International Press Institute has called in for impartial government investigation.

== See also ==
- Sri Lankan civil war
- Human Rights in Sri Lanka
- Notable assassinations of the Sri Lankan Civil War
