= Lalith Alahakoon =

Sri Lankan journalist

- Born: Sri Lanka
- Occupations: Journalist, newspaper editor
- Employer(s): Associated Newspapers of Ceylon Limited (former), Wijeya Newspapers (former)
- Known for: Founding editor of the Daily Mirror
- Notable work: Editorships at Daily Mirror, The Nation, Ceylon Today, Daily News

Lalith Alahakoon is a Sri Lankan journalist and newspaper editor who has served as editor of several prominent Sri Lankan English-language publications.

== Early career ==
Alahakoon began his journalism career in the early 1990s in The Sun, the precursor to The Sunday Times.

== Editorships ==
=== Daily Mirror ===
In January 1996, Alahakoon became the founding editor of the Daily Mirror, an English-language daily published by Wijeya Newspapers. He held this position until March 2006, overseeing the newspaper's launch and establishment.

=== The Nation ===
Following his tenure at the Daily Mirror, Alahakoon served as the chief editor of The Nation, an English-language weekly newspaper. During this period, in May 2008, one of the newspaper's columnists, Keith Noyahr, was abducted and severely beaten. Reports from WikiLeaks also indicated that Defence Secretary Gotabaya Rajapaksa expressed anger toward Alahakoon and another editor during this time.

=== Ceylon Today ===
Alahakoon later became the editor-in-chief of Ceylon Today, another English-language newspaper. His tenure ended abruptly on 13 June 2012, when he was sacked by the management of Ceylon Newspapers, reportedly due to his inability to adhere to the newspaper's editorial policy. The dismissal drew criticism from media advocacy groups, including the Free Media Movement, which expressed concern over the sacking of Alahakoon and a cartoonist.

=== Daily News and Lake House publications ===
In February 2015, following a change in government, Alahakoon was appointed editor of the state-owned Daily News. By April 2016, he was promoted to editor-in-chief of all English publications at the Associated Newspapers of Ceylon Limited (Lake House), including the Daily News and Sunday Observer.
