= Aiyathurai Nadesan =

Tamil journalist of Sri Lanka

- A Nadesan source Tamilnet.com

Aiyathurai Nadesan, a prominent and veteran minority Sri Lankan Tamil journalist was shot dead on 31 May 2004 on his way to work in eastern Sri Lankan town of Batticaloa by gunmen belonging to an armed paramilitary group widely believed to be so called Karuna Group.

== Biography ==
Nadesan, the father of four children and aged 50 at the time of his death, hailed from Nelliyadi, a town in North Jaffna District in Sri Lanka. He wrote under the pen name Nellai Nadesan.

Large crowds attended Nadesan's funeral on 3 June 2004 in his hometown. The normal life of Nelliyady, came to a standstill. Shops were closed. The hearse was taken to the Nelliyady Madhya Maha Vidiyalayam Thursday morning from his residence where funeral orations were delivered by Tamil National Alliance parliamentarians, LTTE activists and Sunanda Deshapriya of the Free Media Movement. A protest demonstration was held in Colombo on 9 June 2004, condemning Nadesan's killing, and a one-day shutdown was observed in the town of Trincomalee. Police have yet to make any arrests in his death.

== Career ==
He was the vice-president of the Sri Lanka Tamil Media Alliance and a recipient of the Best Journalist of 2000 Prize awarded by the Sri Lanka Editors' Guild. He was the Batticaloa based columnist for Virakesari, the country's leading Tamil language newspaper, for more than twenty years.

And also he was the local correspondent for Shakthi TV News and the London based International Broadcasting Corporation. For being a prominent member of the local press, Nadesan received the prize for the best Tamil journalist in 2000.

== Past incidents of intimidation ==
- On 3 April 2000 a bomb exploded at his home in Batticaloa. The United Nations Special Rapporteur on the Promotion and Protection of the Right to Freedom of Opinion and Expression reported to the UN Commission on Human Rights in February 2002. The report said;

"Those responsible for the incident were linked to pro-Government Tamil paramilitaries. Mr. Nadesan had received a telephone death threat after his paper ran an article in March 2000 about atrocities committed by a member of the People's Liberation Organization of Tamil Eelam or PLOTE, an armed paramilitary group that supports the Government's battle against LTTE separatists. Mr. Nadesan had not written the article, although he had regularly written about the activities of PLOTE and other pro-Government Tamil groups in Batticaloa."

In July 2001 the Commanding Officer of the 233 Brigade in Batticaloa, Col. Manawaduge warned and threatened Nadesan. He was summoned to the Commanding Officer's office and told that he writes only anti-government and anti-military news and articles and warned that if he continues in this fashion, action would be taken against him under the Prevention of Terrorism Act. This incident was the subject of an intervention by Free Media Movement on 24 July 2001. This incident was also reported by the United Nations Special Rapporteur on the Promotion and Protection of the Right to Freedom of Opinion and Expression in February 2002.

== See also ==
- Sri Lankan civil war
