= Ponniah Manikavasagam =

Sri Lankan journalist, reporter and writer

- பொன்னையா மாணிக்கவாசகம்
- Died: 12 April 2023; Vavuniya, Northern Province, Sri Lanka
- Occupations: newsreporter, journalist, editor and broadcaster
- Years active: 1983-2023
- Awards: Lifetime Achievement Award in Journalism

Ponniah Manikavasagam also known as P. Manikavasagam was a Sri Lankan news reporter, journalist, editor and broadcaster. During his career as a news reporter, he predominantly covered the Sri Lankan Civil War in his agenda. He was known for his affiliation with Virakesari and BBC Tamil.

== Career ==
He began his career as a reporter at Virakesari in 1980s and served as Virakesari's Vavuniya District correspondent. He also began working as a stringer for international news channels such as BBC and Reuters covering the Sri Lankan region. He was part of the BBC Tamil Radio Service for a duration of roughly 25 years until its suspension in 2016. He also reported stories for Asia Calling (Indonesia) and Free Speech Radio as its Sri Lankan correspondent.

He served as President of the Sri Lanka Tamil Media Alliance and the Vanni Journalists' Association for a brief stint. He faced imminent threats from the government for reporting on sensitive topics focusing on the Sri Lankan civil war. He faced charges for his reporting on the civil war on numerous instances and the most notable occasion came in 1990 when he was detained under police custody for nearly three months. In 2001, he apparently received death threats for having interviewed prominent LTTE cadre Anton Balasingham and the interview was broadcast by BBC Tamil.

In 2013, he was summoned for interrogation by the Terrorism Investigation Department after his telephone conversations he had with few Tamil prisoners at the Magazine prison in Colombo were traced by the officials of the Terrorism Investigation Department, who found the nature of the telephonic conversation to be suspicious. He published a book titled Memories and events are waves of thoughts crashing into the chest that focuses on the tragedies and sorrowful circumstances faced by Jaffna Tamils during the peak of the war.

== Awards ==
He won the Northeastern Provincial Governor's Award for journalism. In December 2022, he was conferred with the Lifetime Achievement Award from the Ministry of Cultural Affairs during the 23rd edition of the Journalism Awards for Excellence organised by The Editors’ Guild of Sri Lanka in collaboration with the Sri Lanka Press Institute.

== Death ==
He died on 12 April 2023 at the age of 76 at his residence in Vavuniya.

== See also ==
- List of Sri Lankan journalists
