= Maa Manithan =

Maa Manithan or Maamanithan may refer to:

- Maa Manithan (1995 film)
- Maamanithan (2022 film)

== See also ==
- Maamanithan, an honour awarded by the rebel Liberation Tigers of Tamil Eelam in Sri Lanka
