= Vigneswaran =

Vigneswaran is a Tamil male given name. Due to the Tamil tradition of using patronymic surnames, it may also be a surname for males and females.

- C. V. Vigneswaran, Sri Lankan Tamil politician
- Vanniasingham Vigneswaran, Sri Lankan Tamil politician
- Vigneswaran Sanasee, Malaysian Tamil politician
