= Sathasivam =

Sathasivam is a name. Notable people with the name include:

- Sathasivam Baskaran, Sri Lankan Tamil newspaper distributor
- Kumaahran Sathasivam (born 1996), Malaysian footballer
- Mahadevan Sathasivam (1915–1977), Sri Lankan cricketer
- P. Sathasivam (born 1949), Indian judge
- Subramaniam Sathasivam (born 1953), Malaysian politician
