= E. Saravanapavan =

Sri Lankan politician

Hon. E. Saravanapavan MP
- ஈ. சரவணபவன்
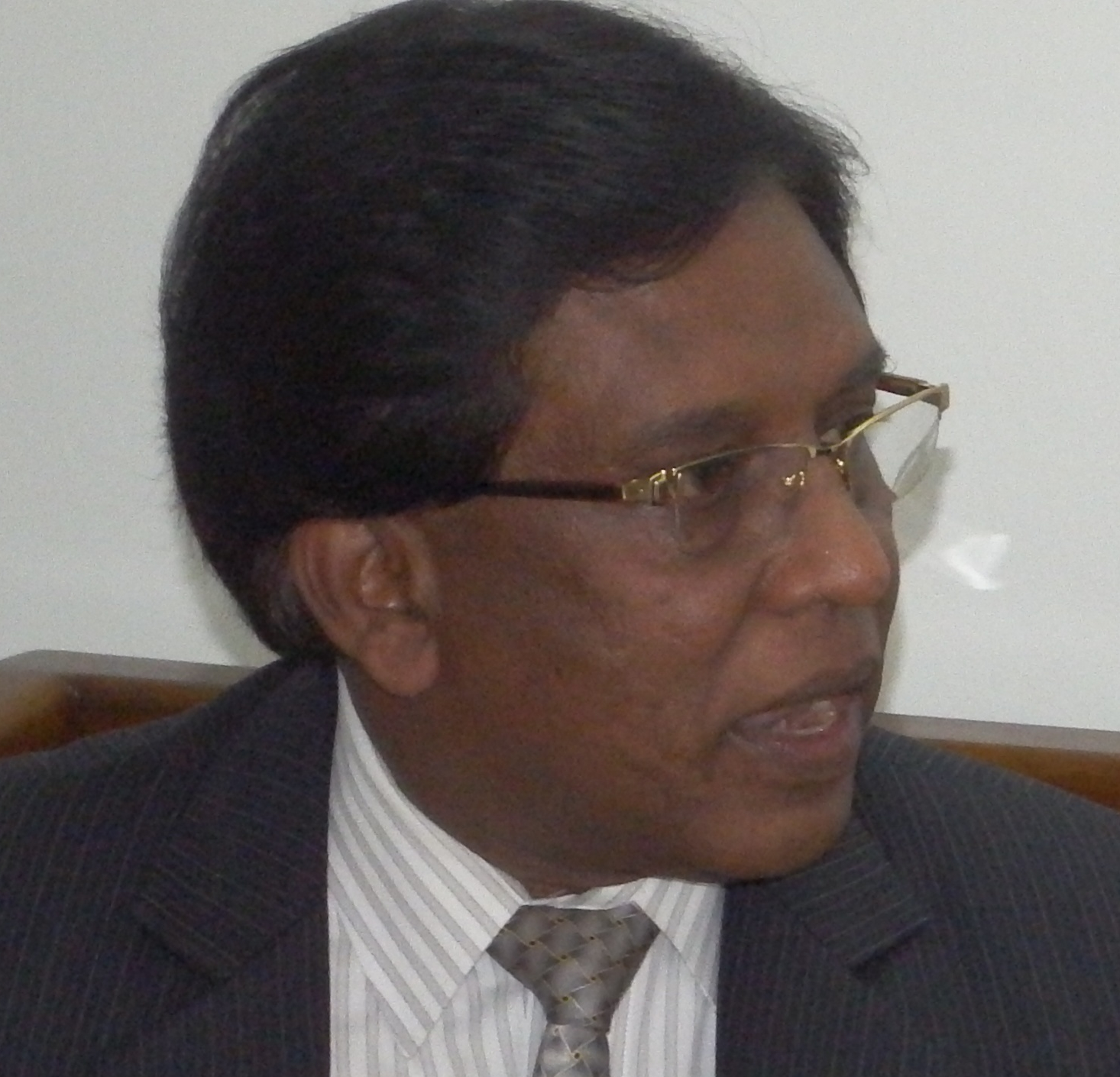

Member of Parliament for Jaffna District
- Incumbent
- Assumed office 8 April 2010

Personal details
- Born: 15 December 1953 (age 72)
- Party: Illankai Tamil Arasu Kachchi
- Other political affiliations: Tamil National Alliance
- Occupation: Publisher, industrialist
- Ethnicity: Sri Lankan Tamil

Eswarapatham Saravanapavan (Tamil: ஈஸ்வரபாதம் சரவணபவன்; born 15 December 1953) is a Sri Lankan Tamil newspaper publisher, politician and member of parliament.

== Early life ==
Saravanapavan was born on 15 December 1953. He was educated at Jaffna Hindu College. He has a Diploma in Business Administration.

== Career ==
Saravanapavan is the managing director of the Uthayan and Sudar Oli Tamil newspapers.

Saravanapavan was one of the Tamil National Alliance's candidates in Jaffna District at the 2010 parliamentary election. He was elected and entered Parliament. He was re-elected at the 2015 parliamentary election.

== Electoral history ==
Electoral history of E. Saravanapavan
Election	Constituency	Party	Votes	Result
2010 parliamentary	Jaffna District	TNA	14,961	Elected
2015 parliamentary	Jaffna District	TNA	43,289	Elected
