= Disappearance of Vadivel Nimalarajah =

Abduction in Sri Lanka

Vadivel Nimalarajah
- Disappeared: Jaffna, Sri Lanka
- Status: Missing for 18 years, 11 months and 12 days
- Occupation: Journalist
- Employer: Uthayan Newspaper

Vadivel Nimalarajah is a minority Sri Lankan Tamil proof reader for the newspaper Uthayan in Jaffna. He has been missing after being abducted on November 17, 2007, after working overnight in the Uthayan newspaper office. Uthayan has been specifically targeted for its independent reporting by the Sri Lankan military and the paramilitary group EPDP.International Federation of Journalists lists his case in its campaign "Without a Trace" amongst the top 10 cases of enforced disappearances of media workers which still remains untraced in Asia Pacific.

== Background ==
Nimalarajah lived in Kachcheari-Nalloor road in Jaffna which is about 2 kilometers from the Uthayan office.He was 31 years old and unmarried. This incident is part of acts of violence and intimidation against journalists and human rights activists taking place in areas controlled by the Sri Lankan government. Vadivel Nimalarajah was abducted by a paramilitary allied with the Sri Lankan Army earlier two journalists of Uthayan were killed after a cartoon mocking Douglas Devananda. His disappearance is part of a series of disappearances of Tamils in Jaffna which is under Army control.

== Incident and reaction ==
Vadivel Nimalarajah disappeared on November 17, 2007, after working overnight in the Uthayan newspaper office in what is termed as an enforced disappearance by human rights groups. A journalist working for Agence France-Presse describing the situation in Jaffna as terrible said

I have never seen anything like it. Even in Iraq under Saddam Hussein, foreign journalists had more freedom of movement".

== See also ==
- List of people who disappeared mysteriously (2000–present)
