= Gnanasundaram Kuganathan =

- Occupation: Editor of Uthayan

Gnanasundaram Kuganathan (Tamil: ஞானசுந்தரம் குகநாதன்) is the Editor of the Tamil newspaper Uthayan in Jaffna, Sri Lanka. He was attacked by two men on motorbikes with iron rods on 29 July 2011. He has lived inside the newspaper office as Uthayan has come under attack from pro government paramilitary groups. Kuganathan lived in the Uthayan office from 2006 to 2010 out of fear for his life but had recently moved back to his family home after assurances were given by the government
