= Sandya Eknelygoda =

Sri Lankan human rights activist

Sandya Eknalygoda
- சந்தியா எக்னெலிகொட
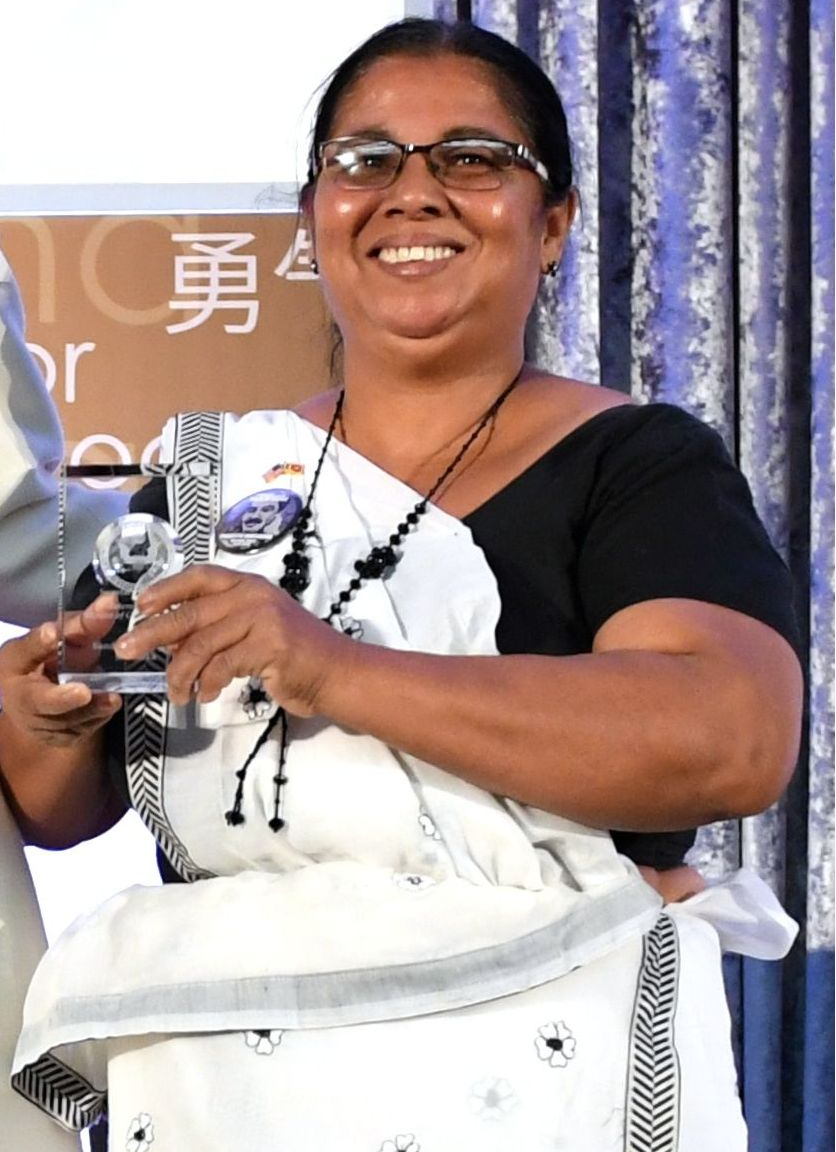
- Sandya Eknelygoda with Melania Trump at the International Women of Courage Award 2017
- Known for: Human rights activist
- Spouse: Prageeth Eknaligoda
- Children: two

Sandya Eknalygoda (Tamil: சந்தியா எக்னெலிகொட) is a Sri Lankan human rights activist. She became an International Women of Courage Award recipient in 2017. She has been campaigning for thousands of missing persons in Sri Lanka. She is married to missing journalist Prageeth Eknaligoda.

Her husband had told her that he was on a hit list and that he was receiving threats that warned him to stop writing. He was investigating corruption when he was kidnapped and returned in 2009. She became actively involved after her husband and prominent journalist Prageeth Eknaligoda disappeared in 2010 when he was investigating the alleged use of chemical weapons against civilians by the Sri Lankan army in the fight against the Tamil rebels.

== Award ==
In 2017, Eknaligoda was awarded with the International Women of Courage Award for her campaigns. She was recognized as one of the BBC 100 Women in December 2022.
