= Namathu Eelanadu =

Sri Lankan newspaper

- Type: Daily
- Founded: 1 October 2002
- Language: Tamil
- Headquarters: Jaffna, Sri Lanka
- Website: https://www.namathueelanadu.com/

Namathu Eelanadu is a Tamil language newspaper. It was founded in 2002. It was known for promoting a Tamil nationalist prospective. The paper's office in Jaffna was raided by the Sri Lanka Army on 15 December 2005 and its staff interrogated.Sinnathamby Sivamaharajah was the managing director of the newspaper. He was shot dead on 20 August 2006 at his temporary home in Tellippalai, which was located 300 meters inside the Valikamam North High security zone. S. Raveendran who was working as a printing machine operator in the newspaper was killed on 12 February 2007 in his house.
