= Maamanithar =

Sri Lankan honorary title

Maamanithar or Maamanithan (Tamil: மாமனிதர் Māmaṉitar; great human being or supremely great man) was an honour awarded by the rebel Liberation Tigers of Tamil Eelam in Sri Lanka. The honour was usually awarded to civilians posthumously.

== Recipients ==
- Kasi Ananthan (born 1938), poet.
- A. Chandranehru (1944–2005), politician; conferred 9 February 2005.
- C. J. Eliezer (1918–2001), academic; conferred 19 October 1997.
- Thillainadarajah Jeyakumar (died 2007); conferred March 2007.
- Joseph Pararajasingham (1934–2005), politician; conferred 25 December 2005.
- Kumar Ponnambalam (1940–2000), politician; conferred January 2000.
- Nadarajah Raviraj (1962–2006), politician; conferred 10 November 2006.
- V. Satchithananthasivam (Gnanatharan) (died 2006), journalist; conferred January 2006.
- Kalaignani A. Selvaratnam; conferred 1991.
- S. Sivamaharajah (1938–2006), politician and publisher; conferred 22 August 2006.
- K. Sivanesan (1957–2008), politician; conferred 7 March 2008.
- Taraki Sivaram (1959–2005), journalist; conferred 30 April 2005.
- Marusaleen Soosainayagam (Naavannan) (died 2006), poet; conferred 15 April 2007.
- A. Thurairajah (1934–1994), academic.
- Vanniasingham Vigneswaran (assassinated 2006); conferred April 2006.
