= C. J. Eliezer =

Ceylon Tamil mathematician, physicist, and academic

Maamanithar C. J. Eliezer AM FIMA
- சி. ஜே. எலியேசர்
- Born: Christie Jayaratnam Eliezer; 12 June 1918; Navatkuli, Ceylon (now Sri Lanka)
- Died: 10 March 2001 (aged 82); Melbourne, Australia
- Education: Ceylon University College; Christ's College, Cambridge
- Occupation: Academic

Christie Jayaratnam Eliezer (Tamil: கிரிஸ்டி ஜெயரத்தினம் எலியேசர், romanized: Kirisṭi Jeyarattiṉam Eliyēcar; 12 June 1918 – 10 March 2001) was a Ceylon Tamil mathematician, physicist and academic.

== Early life and family ==
Eliezer was born on 12 June 1918 in Navatkuli in northern Ceylon. He was the son of Jacob Richard Eliezer and Elizabeth Ponnammah Vairakiam. Both of his parents died when he was young. Eliezer was educated at the Wesleyan Mission School, Puloly and Hartley College, Point Pedro (1926–33) where he passed the Cambridge Local Examinations with honours and distinction. He then spent a year studying at St. Joseph's College, Colombo before joining Ceylon University College in 1935, graduating with a first class honours B.Sc. special degree in mathematics.

Eliezer married Ranee, daughter of Rev. John Handy. They had five children (Dhamayanthi, Ratna, Anandhi, Renuka and Tamara).

== Career ==
Eliezer worked at Ceylon University College as a visiting lecturer in 1938 before proceeding to Christ's College, Cambridge (1939–43) on a scholarship to study mathematics and theoretical physics. He received a first class mathematics tripos from Christ's College in 1941. He received a Ph.D. degree from Cambridge in 1946 after producing a thesis, supervised by Paul Dirac, on spinning electron and electromagnetic field. Returning to Ceylon Eliezer lectured at the University of Ceylon for a brief period before rejoining Christ's College as a fellow (1946–49). He received a D.Sc. degree in 1949. He was called to the bar at the Middle Temple in 1949.

Eliezer was appointed professor of mathematics at University of Ceylon in 1949. During his ten years at the university he was dean of the Faculty of Science from 1954 to 1957 and deputy pro-vice chancellor in 1955. Eliezer was a scholar at the Institute for Advanced Study from 1955 to 1956, working with J. Robert Oppenheimer. He spent some time at the University of Chicago. Following the passing of the Sinhala Only Act in 1956, Sinhalese nationalists at the University of Ceylon, led by vice-chancellor Nicholas Attygalle and chancellor Dudley Senanayake, attempted to remove Tamil as a medium of instruction at the university but this was thwarted by Eliezer and A. M. A. Azeez, a member of the university's council.

Eliezer was appointed foundation professor of mathematics at the University of Malaya in 1959. The appointment was only meant be for two years but the deteriorating situation in Ceylon meant that Eliezer decided to stay in Malaya. During his nine years at the university he was dean of the Faculty of Science from 1959 to 1963 and deputy principal and vice-chancellor for another three years. Eliezer became the first professor of applied mathematics at La Trobe University in 1968. During his 15 years at the university he was dean of the School of Physical Sciences (1969–71 and 1982–83) and deputy vice-chancellor for a period. After retiring in 1983 he was appointed emeritus professor at La Trobe.

Eliezer had been president of the Ceylon Association for the Advancement of Science. He was a Fellow of the Institute of Mathematics and its Applications. He received an honorary D.Sc.Inf. degree from the University of Jaffna in 1981. He was made a Member of the Order of Australia in 1996. He was awarded the Maamanithar (Great Man) honour by the rebel Liberation Tigers of Tamil Eelam on 19 October 1997.

Eliezer was vice-president of the Colombo branch of the Young Men’s Christian Association and a member of the Jaffna College board. He was president of the Ceylon Tamil Association of Victoria and chairman of the Australian Federation of Tamil Associations (1984-2001). Eliezer helped Tamil refugees fleeing to Australia following the 1983 anti-Tamil Black July riots. He co-hosted a Tamil language programme on the Special Broadcasting Service. Eliezer died on 10 March 2001 in Melbourne.

== Works ==
Eliezer wrote several books and articles including:

- Concise Vector Analysis (1963, Pergamon Press)
- A Modern Text-book on Statics: For Students of Applied Mathematics, Physics and Engineering (1964, Pergamon Press)
- Mathematics : Queen of the Arts, Handmaiden of the Sciences (1969, La Trobe University)
- The First Integrals of Some Differential Equations of Dynamics (1978, La Trobe University)
- Mechanics for Year Eleven (1988, co-author J. G. Barton)
