= N. Vithyatharan =

Sri Lankan journalist

- ந. வித்தியாதரன்
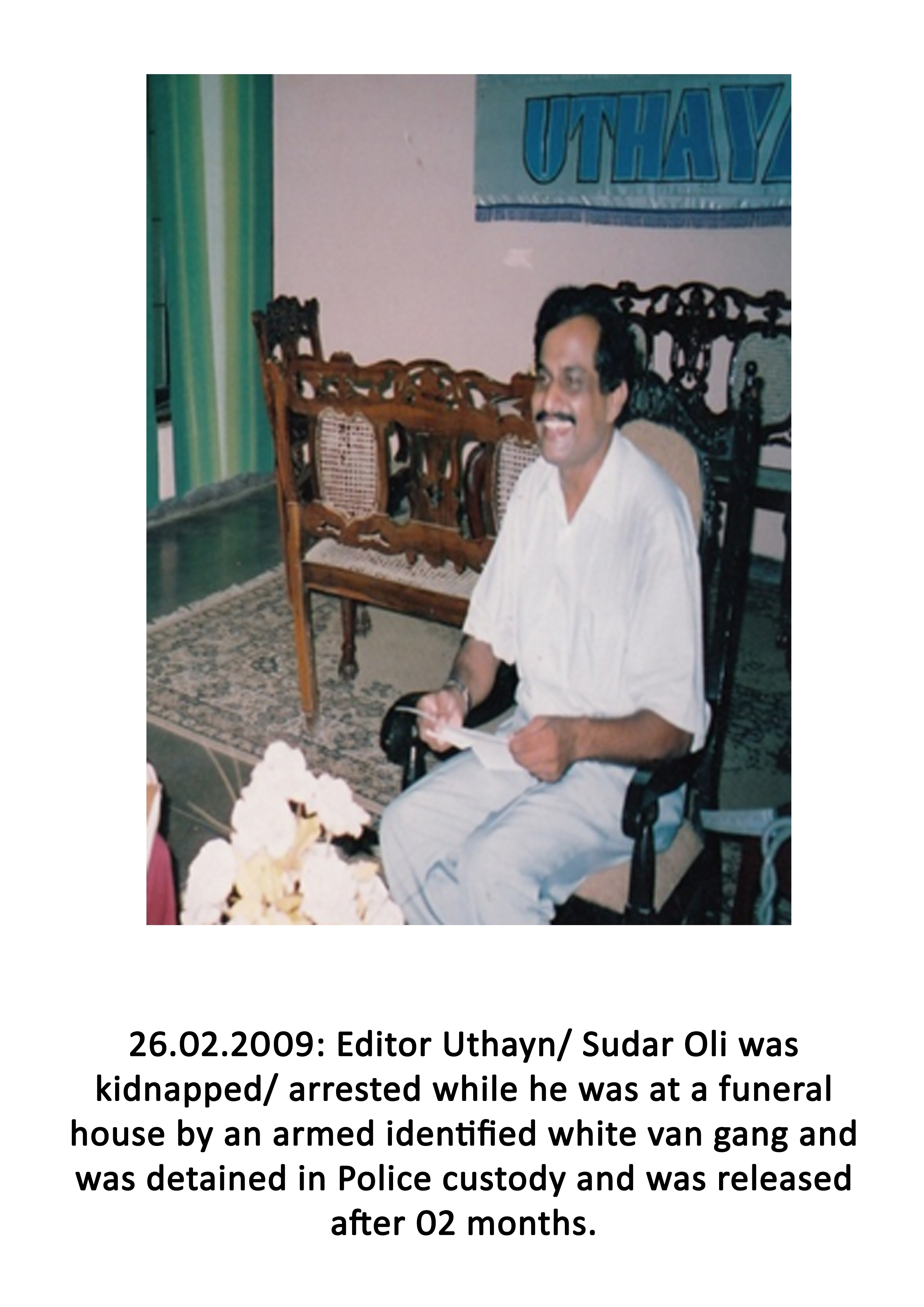
- Born: 1959 (age 66–67); Jaffna, Sri Lanka
- Occupations: Editor of Uthayan and Sudar Oli

Nadesapillai Vithyatharan (born 1959) is a Sri Lankan journalist. He is the editor of Uthayan and Sudar Oli. He has been arrested, threatened, abducted by Sri Lankan Government and backed paramilitary for his newspapers independent reporting. Uthayan has run despite severe difficulties.

== Biography ==
Vithyatharan was born in Jaffna and was student of Jaffna Hindu College and studied law in Colombo but had to discontinue it after the 1983 Black July riots and returned to Jaffna. He took up journalism and has been working in the Uthayan in 1985 since its inception. Uthayan has been attacked several times and its staff killed.

He has started his own news paper Kalaikathir on 2016 after he left from Uthayan News Paper.
