= Allegations of chemical weapon use in the Sri Lankan civil war =

Chemical weapons were reported to have been used by the Sri Lankan military and the rebel Liberation Tigers of Tamil Eelam (LTTE) during the Sri Lankan Civil War.

== Usage by the Sri Lankan military ==
=== Interview of an army officer ===
The 2014 documentary This Land Belongs to the Army aired an interview with a Sri Lankan soldier who confirmed that chemical weapons were used by the Sri Lanka Army in the final phase of the war. In this footage the Sri Lankan soldier points to a "chemical weapon", calling it "a very potent weapon" and describes in detail how it works. He further states: "When it hits the grounds it disintegrates into several pieces. The chemical in this burns the skin immediately, We used this in the last stages of the war." The documentary also broadcast images from the war which showed victims of these attacks suffering from chemical burns, and interviewed the wife of journalist Prageeth Eknaligoda, who disappeared after reporting on the army's usage of chemical weapons. The Indian news channel NewsX first broadcast the footage from the documentary.

=== Other accusations ===
The LTTE has accused the Sri Lankan military of obtaining and using chemical weapons against its combatants and Tamil civilians. In 2001 the LTTE claimed that the government had obtained banned chemical weapons, and warned of "dangerous consequences" should they be deployed on the battlefield. The accusation was made in relation to the government's purchase of RPO-A Shmel Thermobaric rocket launchers, which are neither banned nor are chemical weapons. The pro-LTTE politician Joseph Pararajasingham also referred to these as banned chemical weapons solely intended to annihilate the Tamil people.

In 2009 a senior LTTE commander claimed to have witnessed and escaped extensive chemical attacks against LTTE combatants. A 2009 United States diplomatic cable leak however indicates that the International Committee of the Red Cross and the High Commissioner of India in Sri Lanka reported that their medical teams treating the wounded during the final stages of the war came across no evidence of chemical weapons use by government forces as alleged by Tamil groups. The UN Secretary General's Panel of Experts on Accountability in Sri Lanka reported allegations that chemical agents were used against civilians, but stated that it could not reach a conclusion regarding their credibility.

In 2010 the wife of cartoonist Prageeth Eknaligoda has claimed that he went missing after he started researching the Sri Lankan military's use of chemical weapons in war and started publicizing his findings to diplomats outside Sri Lanka.

In January 2014, the Roman Catholic Bishops in the former war zone called for an international inquiry as to whether government forces used cluster munitions and chemical weapons in densely populated areas.

== Allegations against the LTTE ==
The Sri Lankan government has accused the LTTE of planning and carrying out chemical attacks. In 2007 the Sri Lankan Prime Minister Ratnasiri Wickremanayake claimed that security forces had intercepted rebels transporting large quantities of acid in preparation for a major attack. In 2009 the Sri Lankan military reported that they had captured a stock of gas masks and chemical resistant suits from an LTTE camp in Mullaithivu. The Defence Ministry claimed that the LTTE had been carrying out low impact chemical gas attacks during the course of the final Eelam war, and that this discovery was evidence of a plot for a massive chemical attack. Foreign Secretary Palitha Kohona stated that the government has requested an investigation from the Organisation for the Prohibition of Chemical Weapons into charges of chemical weapons use by the LTTE.

In 1990 the LTTE conducted a chemical attack using commercially obtained barrels of chlorine gas against a Sri Lanka army encampment in eastern Kiran, in the Batticaloa district. This was noted as the first non-state use of a chemical weapon in warfare. LTTE also used the non-lethal agent CS gas against advancing government troops but with little effect due to the troops being prepared for chemical warfare however several soldiers developed breathing difficulties. The aerosol version of CS gas is commonly used for tear gas in riot control but it is used in several variants some of which can cause severe burns. The symptoms reported by soldiers however were mild and limited to breathing difficulties, vomiting and skin rashes.
