= Maunasami Parameswaree =

Maunasami Parameswaree also spelt Manusamy Parameshwari is a minority Sri Lankan Tamil journalist for the newspaper Mawbima. She was arrested on 24 November 2006 under anti-terrorist legislation and later released after International human rights and Media organisation campaign for her release after being jailed for 4 months without charge.

== Background ==
This incident is part of acts of violence and intimidation against journalists and human rights activists taking place in Sri Lanka. These killings are part of a series of killing, abduction, and attacks on the Tamil Media in Sri Lanka. These killings, abductions, and threats are seen as part of the dirty war launched by Mahindra Rajapakse government.

== Incident ==
Maunasami Parameswaree was arrested when she went to interview a Tamil women whose brother had been abducted. She and the women were arrested. Her family members were assaulted in Gompala in Kandy. Mawbima was forced to close for carrying critical reports about the Rajapakse Government. Dushantha Basnayake the finance director of the financial director of Standard Newspapers Private Limited which publishes Mawbima was also arrested under the anti terrorism law. Sri Lankan government newspaper published a stories that explosives was recovered based on her confession however it turned that it was a fake story by the Sri Lankan officials and no explosives were recovered. She was a strong critic of human rights violations by the Sri Lankan Military.

== Release ==
Maunasami Parameswaree was released after no evidence could be found against her but the fate of the women arrested with her is unknown.
