= Uthayan =

Sri Lankan Tamil language newspaper

- Type: Daily newspaper
- Format: Print, online
- Owner: Uthayan Group of Newspapers
- Founder: E. Saravanapavan
- Publisher: New Uthyan Publication (Private) Limited
- Editor-in-chief: M. V. Kanamaylnathan
- Managing editor: E. Saravanapavan
- Founded: 27 November 1985
- Political alignment: Neutral
- Language: Tamil
- Headquarters: 361 Kasthuriyar Road, Jaffna, Sri Lanka
- Sister newspapers: Sudar Oli
- Website: uthayan.com

Uthayan (Tamil: உதயன், romanized: Utayaṉ, English: Morning) is a Tamil language Sri Lankan daily newspaper published by New Uthayan Publication (Private) Limited, part of the Uthayan Group of Newspapers. It was founded in 1985 and is published from Jaffna. Its sister newspaper is the Colombo-based Sudar Oli. Uthayan was the only newspaper published from Jaffna which did not cease publication due to the civil war. The newspaper has been attacked several times; a number of its staff have been murdered by paramilitary groups and other forces, and it regularly receives threats.

== History ==
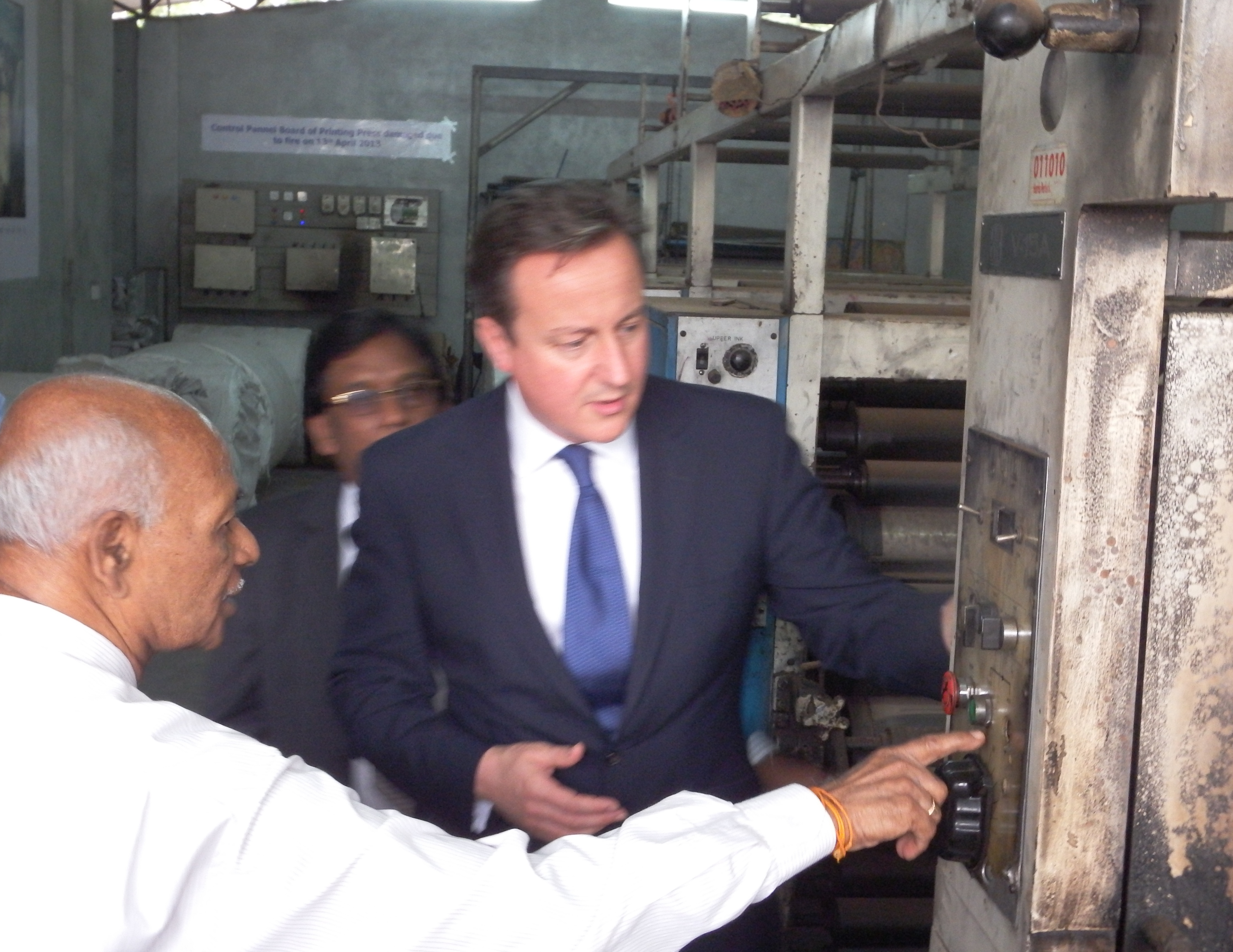
David Cameron, Prime Minister of the United Kingdom inspecting burnt down printing press of Uthayan newspaper in Jaffna on 15 November 2013 while M. V. Kanamaylnathan, the Editor of the newspaper explaining something to him. E. Saravanapavan, the Managing Director of the newspaper looking on.

Uthayan was founded in 1985 by E. Saravanapavan with the first edition being published on 27 November 1985. At that time there were two other newspapers published from Jaffna: the Tamil language Eelamurasu and Eelanadu. Murasoli began publishing from Jaffna in 1986.

As the civil war escalated newspapers published from Jaffna came under pressure from both government forces and the rebel militant groups. Eelamurasu and Eelanadu were taken over by the rebel Liberation Tigers of Tamil Eelam (LTTE) in 1987 and 1994 respectively.

In October 1995, as the Sri Lankan military launched a military offensive to recapture the Jaffna peninsula from the LTTE, virtually the entire population of the Valikamam region fled to other parts of the peninsula and the Vanni. Uthayan staff fled from their Jaffna offices, taking printing machine, a generator and newsprint on a truck. They set up a temporary office in Sarasalai, Thenmarachchi from where they published the paper until April 1996. Then the paper returned to Jaffna after the military had recaptured most of the peninsula including Jaffna city. By 1996 the Uthayan was the only newspaper published from Jaffna.

Uthayan was shut down by the Sri Lankan government on 19 May 2000 using the recently passed draconian law – the Emergency (Miscellaneous Provisions and Powers) Regulation No.1 of 2000. The Sri Lanka Army cut off the phone lines, locked the offices and took away the keys. The newspaper re-opened 45 days later on 4 July 2000 after the government lifted its ban.

Sub-editor N. Vithyatharan was interrogated by the police for two hours at his offices 20 January 2001 regarding an interview with Anton Balasingham, the LTTE's chief negotiator and political advisor.

After the civil war resumed the Sri Lankan military closed the A9 road which was the main road link between the Jaffna peninsula and the rest of the country. This resulted in an acute shortage of food, fuel, medicine and other supplies, including newsprint and printing ink, on the peninsula. Uthayan was forced to drastically cut its number of pages and the copies printed – it went from 20,000 copies of a 12-page paper to 7,500 copies of a 4-page paper.

Editor N. Vithyatharan was arrested by the police without a warrant on 26 February 2009 as he attended a funeral in Mount Lavinia without a warrant and allegedly beaten in custody. As international criticism of the arrest intensified the Sri Lankan government claimed Vithyatharan had been arrested in connections with the LTTE air raid on Colombo. Vithyatharan was released on 24 April 2009 after the Colombo Crimes Division informed the court that there was no evidence connecting him to the air raid. Vithyatharan alleged that he had been detained in order to prevent him highlighting the plight of the civilians in the Vanni.

== Attacks ==
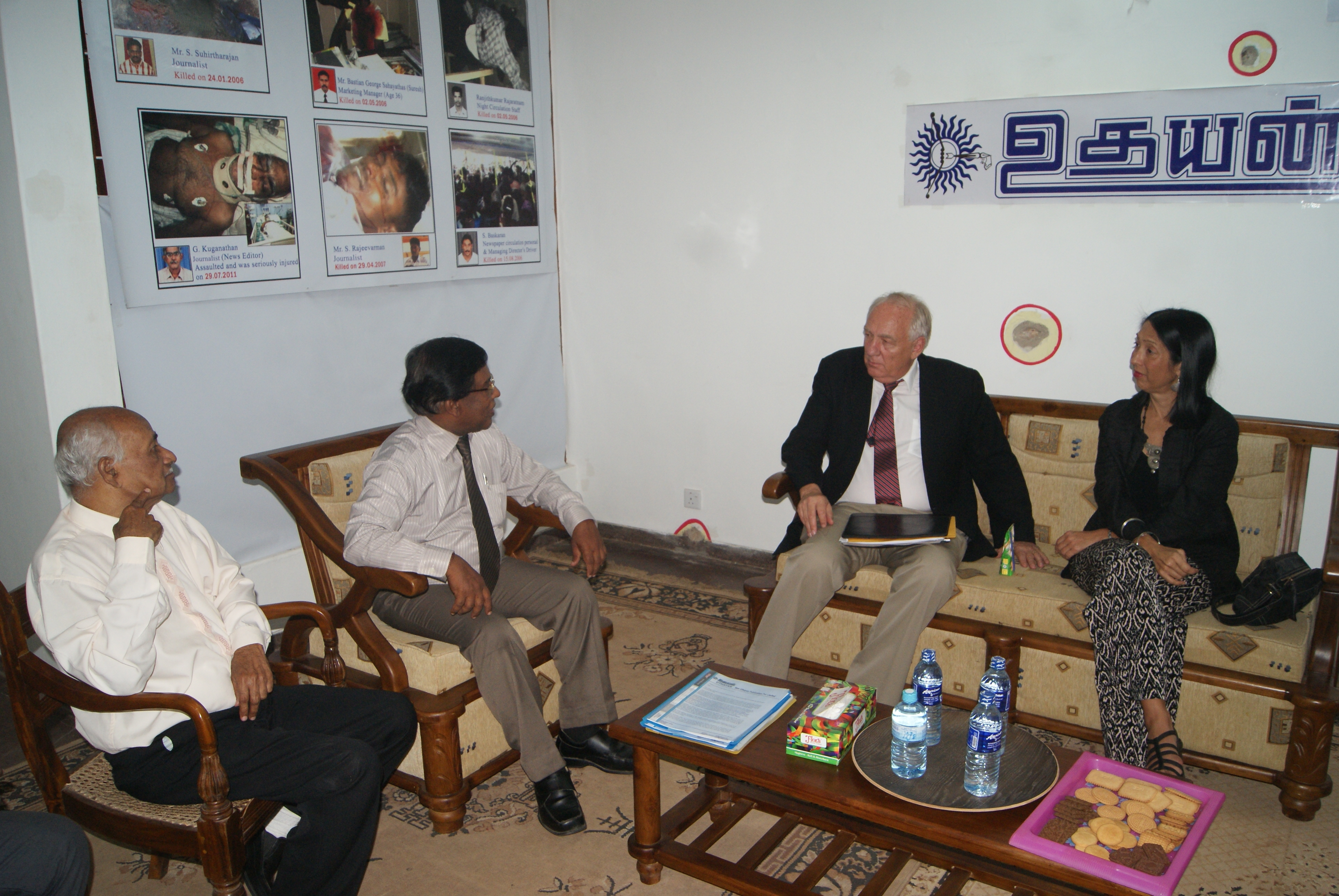
Stephen J. Rapp, the United States Ambassador-at-Large for War Crimes Issues and Michele J. Sison, US ambassador to Sri Lanka are discussing with E. Saravanapavan, managing director of the Uthayan newspaper and M. V. Kanamaylnathan, Editor-in-chief at Uthayan Newspapers's Office in Jaffna on 8 January 2014. Some of the bullet holes and portraits of slain staff are visible on the wall behind them.

The Uthayan and its employees have been subject to numerous attacks during its existence. In 1987, the Sri Lankan security forces attacked the Navalar Road in Jaffna, where the Uthayan offices were located, using artillery. Two Uthayan employees were injured and 40 others in the area were killed. In 1990, the Uthayan's offices were hit by an air raid killing one employee and injuring five.

A Journalist named Velupillai Thavachelvam was attacked on 29 August 1998 at his home in Sembianpattu, Vadamarachchi. Thavachelvam had written a report critical of the local authority. The following year, two grenades were thrown into the newspaper's offices, exploding near the printing machines and injuring security guard S. Selvarajah. The Eelam People's Democratic Party (EPDP), a government backed paramilitary group, was blamed for the attack. The Uthayan had recently criticised government-backed paramilitary groups.

On 20 August 2005, two grenades were thrown into the advertising office of the Uthayan and Sudar Oli in Wellawatte, but failed to explode.

Suresh Kumar (B. G. Sahayathasan) and Ranjith Kumar, two employees of the newspaper, were killed on 2 May 2006 when armed men burst into the newspaper's offices and opened fire indiscriminately. The attack followed the newspaper publishing a cartoon mocking Douglas Devananda, the leader of the EPDP.

A delivery driver and an agent named Sathasivam Baskaran was shot dead at the wheel of his delivery truck on 15 August 2006 at Puttur junction near Achchuveli. Baskaran was shot in an area controlled by the Sri Lankan military. Three days later, on 18 August 2006, a warehouse in Kopay was burnt down by armed men as a curfew was in place.

Armed men entered the Uthayan offices on 7 September 2006 and ordered staff to publish a statement urging Jaffna's students to call off their strike, threatening "severe reprisals" if the statement wasn't published. A few days later, on 10 September 2006, two armed men who entered into the Uthayan offices were arrested by the policemen who were guarding the building. But they were released within hours.

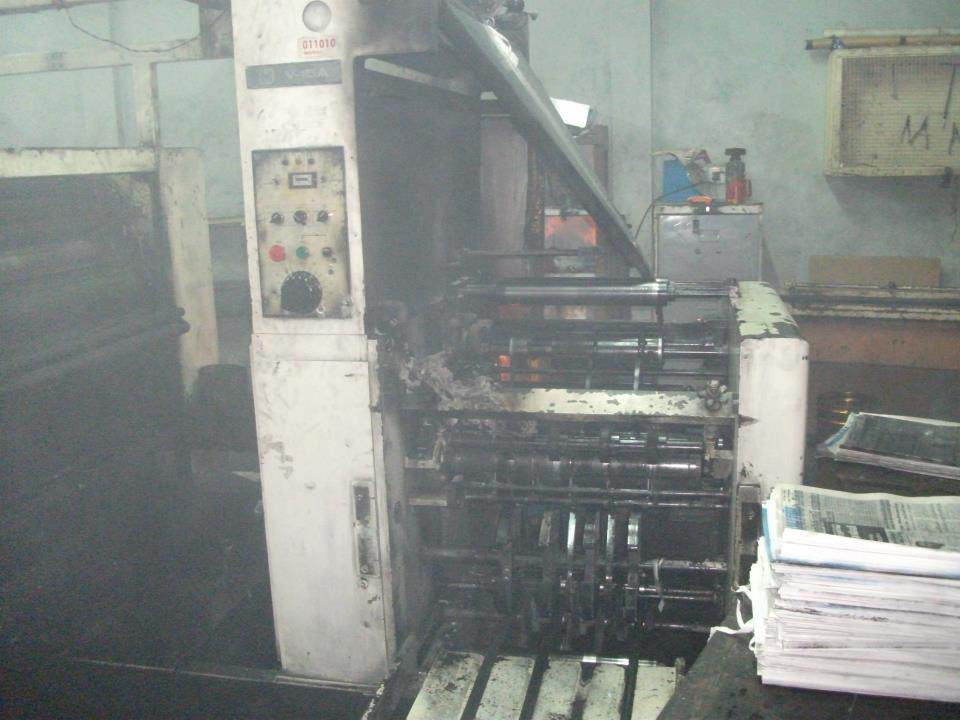
Damaged printing press after attack in Jaffna on 13 April 2013.

Journalist Selvarajah Rajivarnam, an Uthayan reporter for six months prior to his death, was shot dead in Jaffna close to a military checkpoint on 29 April 2007. The EPDP was blamed for Rajivarnam's murder. A proofreader, Vadivel Nimalarajah, was abducted on 17 November 2007 near Jaffna as he returned home after work.

A grenade was thrown into the newspaper's office in Jaffna on 24 March 2009 causing extensive damage and injuring a security guard. Same year, on 25 June, thousands of copies of the Uthayan, Thinakkural and Valampuri were burnt in the street by armed men, after the papers had refused to print a statement against the LTTE.

A staff correspondent of the newspaper, S. Kavitharan, was attacked by a group of men on 28 May 2011 as he cycled to work. Kavitharan had written articles critical of the security in Jaffna and the actions of government-backed paramilitary groups whose members had previously threatened Kavitharan. On 29 July, the same year, Uthayan's chief news editor Gnanasundaram Kuganathan was brutally attacked as he walked home from the office in Jaffna. The EPDP was blamed for the attack. Between 2006 and 2010 Kuganathan lived in the Uthayan offices out of fear for his life but had recently moved back to his family home after assurances were given by the government.

Nagesh Pratheepan and two other Uthayan distributors were attacked and newspapers torched by four men on two motorbikes on 10 January 2013 as they were distributing them in the Valvettithurai area.

The paper's office in Kilinochchi were attacked by a group of six masked Sinhala-speaking men on 3 April 2013. Five employees were injured, two seriously, and equipment and vehicles damaged. The newspaper blamed the security forces for the attack. The attack came after the paper published a series of articles highlighting seizure of Tamil owned land by the army. Ten days later, on 13 April 2013, three men came to the paper's office in Jaffna and threatened security guards before damaging equipment and setting the printing press ablaze.

=== Commentary on attacks by notable media/personalities/entities ===
- Committee to Protect Journalists

"These attacks on the offices of Uthayan have been going on for years and typify the threats faced by the Tamil press in Sri Lanka," said CPJ Asia Program Coordinator Bob Dietz.

- Reporters Without Borders

"At least five of its employees have been killed this year, two of them in an attack on the newspaper on the eve of World Press Freedom Day. The press that prints the Colombo edition was the target of an arson attack in September. In Jaffna, the newspaper has twice been forced to publish communiqués at gunpoint", RSF said.

- United States Department of State

"As we continue our free the press campaign we will highlight the case of Uthayan, a Tamil language newspaper in Sri Lanka. Uthayan has seen its personnel beaten, its newspaper shipments burned, its equipment destroyed and its offices set ablaze in the past month alone. The assault on a free press in Sri Lanka extends beyond Uthayan" Speaking at the US State Department's daily press briefing in Washington, the Department's Acting Deputy Spokesperson, Patrick Ventrell, expressed.

- Human Rights Watch

The Rajapaksa government has a long history of media harassment and attacks on journalists critical of the government, Human Rights Watch said. Publications − including electronic media − that oppose government policies have been subject to censorship, and some have been forced to close down. The leading Tamil opposition newspaper, Uthayan, has faced repeated physical attacks against its journalists and property.

- International Federation of Journalists

"The International Federation of Journalists (IFJ) joins partners and affiliates in Sri Lanka in unequivocally condemning the repeated targeting of the Tamil newspaper Uthayan.......... The effort to silence Uthayan after the country’s long civil war was formally declared over in May 2009, 'is seen as a direct attack on post-war democracy and media freedom in the country, aimed at suppressing the dissemination of important information and diverse views among the public'.

- The Wall Street Journal

"The newspaper has supported self-rule for Tamils and its staff has repeatedly faced threats and violence, the most serious in 2006 when gunmen stormed its offices and killed two staffers."

- The Globe and Mail

".....I also saw the bullet holes above the sofa in the office of the editor of a Tamil language newspaper in Jaffna. Days after we visited the paper, its offices were trashed and employees beaten." – Hugh Segal.

== Awards and recognition ==
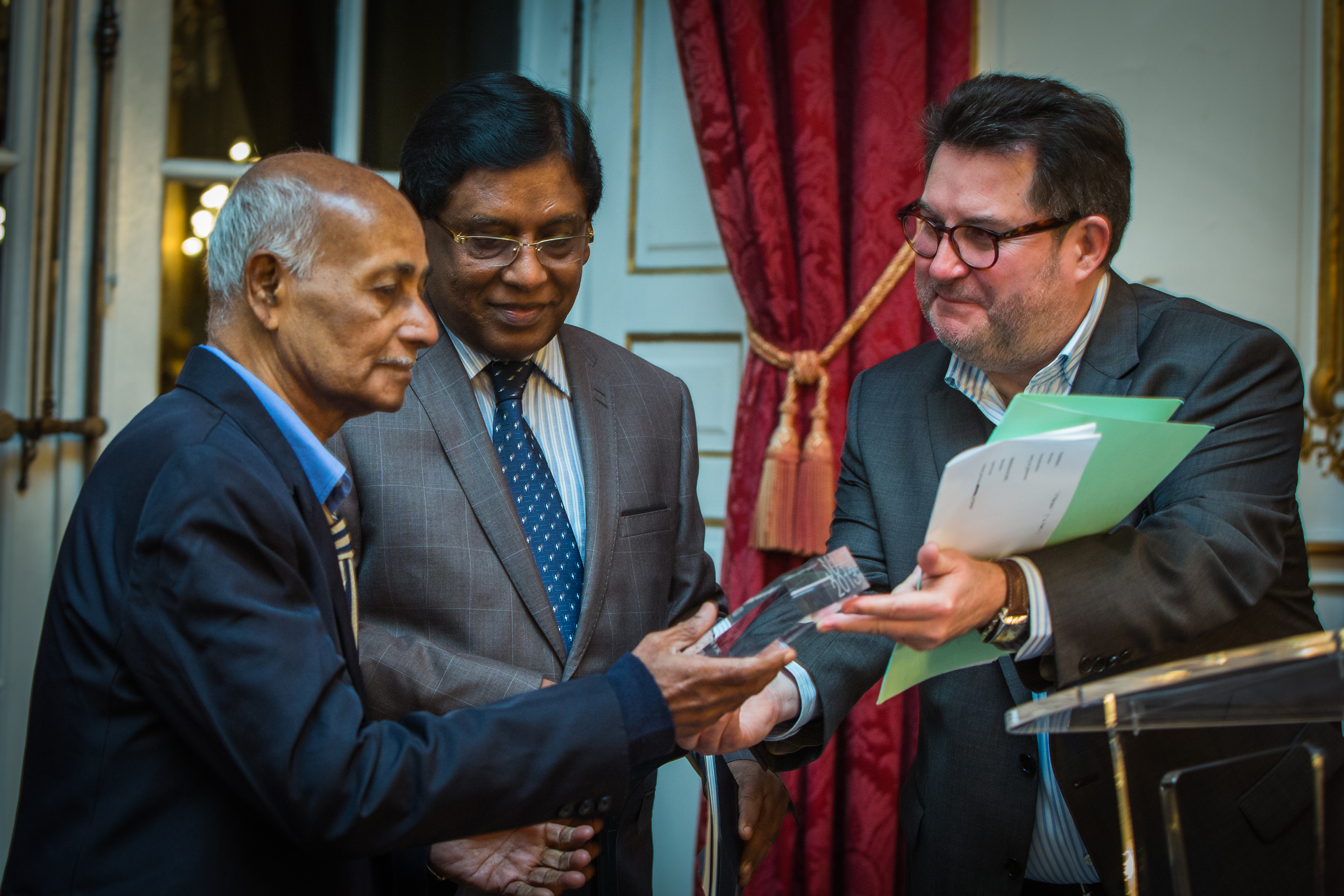
The awarding ceremony of the Reporters Without Borders-Fondation de France Prize, in Strasbourg, November 2013.

The Uthayan was nominated in the "Media" category in the 15th Reporters Without Borders-Fondation de France Prize. It was awarded by the prize in 2013.

The Uthayan received the Public service and Tolerance Journalism Award at a ceremony at Galle Face Hotel on 24 October 2008 organised by six Sri Lankan journalists associations (National Federation of Journalists, Federation of Media Employee's Trade Unions, Free Media Movement, Sri Lankan Working Journalists Association, Sri Lanka Muslim Media Forum and Sri Lanka Tamil Media Alliance).

The chief editor and staff of Uthayan won the Sepala Gunasena Award for Defending Press Freedom in Sri Lanka award at the Journalism Awards for Excellence 2008 held at Mount Lavinia Hotel on 14 July 2009.

In its August 2007 report The International Press Freedom Mission to Sri Lanka describes the Uthayan as "a heroic paper". It goes on to say – "This newspaper, Jaffna’s most popular Tamil daily, has paid a heavy price for doing its job since it was founded in November 1985. Its offices were bombed by the Indian army in the 1980s and then by Sri Lankan war planes in 1990. Its staff have been threatened by several Tamil armed groups, including the EPRLF and the EPDP, that have been fighting in Jaffna for the past 20 years, and in 1999 paramilitaries threw a grenade into its offices."
