= Annalakshmi Rajadurai =

Sri Lankan newspaper editor, author, novelist and journalist

- அன்னலட்சுமி இராசதுரை
- Born: 8 June 1939 (age 87); Thirunelveli, Jaffna District, Jaffna, Sri Lanka
- Occupations: newspaper editor, author, novelist and journalist
- Writing career
- Notable awards: Sahityaratna Award (2024)

Annalakshmi Rajadurai also spelt as Annalatchumi Rajadurai (born 8 June 1939) is a Sri Lankan newspaper editor, author, novelist and journalist. She is regarded as one of the few women to have worked extensively for newspaper publications in Sri Lanka during the 1960s era, at a time when Sri Lankan newspaper were predominantly dominated by men. She played an instrumental role in raising the weight of expectations and standards of the Sri Lankan Tamil daily newspaper Virakesari which eventually became the most popular and sought-after Tamil newspaper among the Sri Lankan Tamil population.

== Biography ==
She was born on 8 June 1939 during the era of World War II. She grew up in a humble family background in the village of Thirunelveli located in the Jaffna Peninsula, Northern Province. Her father Rasaiya worked as a carpenter while her mother was a household just like majority of the women during that time.

She grew up in an era where people in Sri Lankan culture showed little to no interest in education due to the prevalence of the critical issues faced by the marginalized population such as famine which threatened their livelihoods, causing severe difficulties even to fulfill the basic requirements on a daily basis. However, the sentiments about the need of educating children slowly began to prosper in an optimistic manner during the mid-1940s, as parents in Sri Lanka shown more eager towards providing the best education facilities to their children including daughters. Annalakshmi also reaped benefits as a result of the change in mindset of the previous generation who understood the necessity of educating their children as the best possible solution to help them overcome life challenges pertaining to poverty.

She obtained her primary education at the Tirunelveli Hindu mixed school. She completed her London-based syllabus oriented Advanced Level Examination at the Ramanathan College in Chunnakam. She even realised about the scarcity of newspapers and decided to make an habit to read newspaper articles which were often used as alternative option to wrap grocery items.

== Career ==
She began her career in newspaper journalism and soon stamped her authority with her writing abilities catering to a target audience. In fact, she developed a keen interest in reading newspapers at a young age which also inculcated a sense of passion in herself to pursue her career as a full-time journalist. She penned a short story in 1958 and eventually sent it to be published in Thinakaran newspaper. In April 1962, she came across a newspaper advertisement requesting for youngsters to apply for the job role of a sub editor and the details related to the advertisement was published in Virakesari. She faced the oral interview which landed her the opportunity of becoming a sub-editor and she also apparently met another woman at her workplace Yoga Balachandran who had previously served as a sub-editor in Dinapathi and Chintamani. Both coincidentally shared relatively similar thoughts and worked together in collaboration at the Virakesari newspaper press. She began her career with Virakesari in June 1962 and it became an integral part of her life in a career spanning over five decades with the newspaper press.

She was handed over the prime responsibility of being the editor of the weekly magazine Thodhi in 1966. She had also written and published a handful of novels and short stories under the pen name and pseudonym of Jaffna Nangai. She also served in as the editor of Mithiran Varamalar magazine for a stint stretching from 1973 to 1984. She attended the World Conference on Women in Beijing in 1995, in a significant milestone moment highlighting the changes in stereotypes surrounding around women which began to tumble in the 1990s era. She also participated at the World Classical Tamil Conference on 2010 which was held in Coimbatore, Tamil Nadu. She also took over the controls of handling the weekly supplements including Mangaiyar Kesari and Kalai Kesari during the aftermath of the dawn of the new millennium 2000. She also had a stint of 10 years working as the chief editor of Virakesari's international magazine Kala Kesari, specifically focusing on Tamil culture, art, history and archeology related elements. She also published several independent books covering about the legacy of Tamil culture and Tamil literature during her illustrious career.

In March 2022, coinciding with the celebration of the International Women's Day, she was conferred with the prestigious lifetime achievement award for excellence in journalism by the Tamil Speaking Women Media Organization in a joint collaboration with the Rainbow Institute.

In October 2024, she was nominated and slated to receive the prestigious Sahityaratna Award, which is a coveted lifetime achievement award usually conferred for individuals who have excelled in the field of literature at the State Literary Awards. She was nominated for the Sahityaratna Award in the Tamil category in recognition for her outstanding contributions in media and for her significance in coverage of Tamil culture through her writings.
