= Rohana Kumara =

Sri Lankan journalist

- Died: 7 September 1999; Colombo
- Occupation: Chief Editor of Satana
- Spouse: Gayani Pavithra

Rohana Kumara was a Sri Lankan journalist. He was the chief editor of the pro-opposition Sinhala-language newspaper Satana. He was shot dead while he was travelling home in a taxi after having received a call that his house had been attacked. He was facing a series of defamation cases for writing about government corruption. The Free Media Movement and The Sunday Leader accused Chandrika Kumaratunga's security unit of being behind the attack and murder of Rohana Kumara and shielding the killers.

Rohana Kumara had been detained earlier in 1996 under the Prevention of Terrorism Act after he reported government losses during Battle of Mullaitivu in 1996, in which the rebel LTTE routed Sri Lankan army, and put up news posters calling for the resignation of Anuruddha Ratwatte the deputy defense minister, who he held responsible for the defeat. The posters stated:

"Who is responsible for the Mullaitivu debacle? Dead bodies in the south. Ratwatte [Deputy Defence Minister] resign! Read the newspaper Hoo!"

Four other employees of the newspaper were also detained, but they, along with Rohana Kumara, were freed.

Minister Mahinda Wijesekara had openly threatened to kill Satana editor Rohana Kumara, The Sunday Leader editor Lasantha Wickramatunga, and Ravaya editor Victor Ivan for articles about corruption in his ministry in the lobby of the Sri Lankan Parliament.
