= Valampuri =

- Type: Daily newspaper
- Language: Tamil
- Headquarters: Jaffna, Sri Lanka

Valampuri is a Tamil newspaper based in Jaffna, Sri Lanka.It has been targeted for its independent reporting by paramilitary groups and other forces, and it regularly receives threats.
