= TamilNet =

Online newspaper covering Sri Lanka

- Website type: Online newspaper
- Founder: Muthuthamby Sreetharan
- Website: www.tamilnet.com
- Launched: 1997; 29 years ago
- Current status: Active

TamilNet is an online newspaper that provides news and feature articles on current affairs in Sri Lanka, specifically related to the erstwhile Sri Lankan Civil War. The website was formed by members of the Sri Lankan Tamil community residing in the United States and publishes articles in English, German and French.

It is Tamil nationalist and is described as a pro LTTE website.

Tamilnet and non-governmental organizations such as Free Media Movement (FMM), Committee to Protect Journalists (CPJ) and ARTICLE 19 confirm that the website is currently banned in Sri Lanka.

== Operations ==
TamilNet was founded in 1995 by a group of Tamil diaspora professionals, including computer programmer K. Jayachandran from Norway, a systems analyst from the UK and several “dotcom” entrepreneurs from the United States to counter what they thought was a biased Western press coverage of the Sri Lankan conflict. In 1996 the journalist Dharmeratnam Sivaram was invited by the group to reform their website after being unable to attract visitors. In 1997 TamilNet was relaunched along the lines laid down by its now editor Sivaram to make it a professional ‘neutral’ wire service:

village-based Tamil reporters were to be trained in the techniques of conventional Western reporting. All factual assertions were to be triple-checked and double-sourced, all interviews (if possible) recorded, and all nationalist rhetoric was to be removed from the site. There would no longer be funny numbers, patriotic poems, pictures of martyred LTTE fighters, or invocations of Eelam, the hoped-for Tamil state. Instead, the tone would be the flat, unemotional, supremely confident...monotone of international journalism and of much social science.

TamilNet reporters are on the ground mostly in the provincial villages of the North and East of Sri Lanka, where reporters are supplied with digital equipment. Reports are generated in Tamil and emailed to bilingual translators and editors in United States, Europe, Australia or to Colombo, Sri Lanka. This network of on the ground reporters has allowed TamilNet to circumvent Sri Lankan government's censorship laws.

== Perceptions ==
Reuters, Associated Press, BBC News, Agence France Presse, Xinhua and Al Jazeera English all refer to TamilNet as "the pro-LTTE website".

Mark Whitaker, an Associate Professor of Anthropology at the University of South Carolina and research collaborator of former senior TamilNet editor Taraki Sivaram, argues that TamilNet merely shares the Sri Lankan Tamil nationalist ideology of the LTTE and is not an arm of the organization. For instance, he says TamilNet had once fired a sub-editor who had become an activist for the LTTE. He also says TamilNet has faced complaints and "extreme displeasure" from both the Sri Lankan Government and the LTTE. Whitaker also says the LTTE has been deeply unhappy of "undue" coverage given on TamilNet to criticism of the organization by international human rights organizations. However, Whitaker believes much of the criticism directed at TamilNet by the LTTE is off public view, since the LTTE considers such moves as weakening Tamil nationalism.

According to ARTICLE 19, a global human rights organization with a specific mandate and focus on the defense and promotion of freedom of expression and freedom of information worldwide, the news website although some claim it has an LTTE bias, it has over its ten-year life span, earned a reputation for providing alternative news and opinions with a particular focus on the North and East of the country, operating under the banner of "Reporting to the World on Tamil Affairs". It is relied upon as a credible news source by journalists, civil society and the diplomatic community both within Sri Lanka and globally. Over the years, the site has endured various threats and attacks, including the gunning down in April 2005 of editor, Sivaram Dharmaratnam.

== Criticism and Counter-Criticism ==
Experts in the field argue TamilNet's accuracy of its reporting has "rarely been successfully challenged that such charges ring hollow". According to V. Sambandan, Sri Lanka Special Correspondent for the Indian English daily The Hindu, "facts and figures are double sourced, checked and are considered 100% credible".

However a Sri Lanka analyst for the prominent Indian English daily The Hindu, whose chief editor N. Ram was awarded the Sri Lanka Rathna and is noted for being virulently anti-LTTE, states "TamilNet (www.tamilnet.com) is the unofficial mouthpiece of the Tigers in English. It is a kind of news agency chronicling the conflict as perceived by the LTTE. The site is a `must hit' for any serious Sri Lanka watcher. A senior official in the Sri Lankan Presidential Secretariat told Frontline, "My first port of call on the internet is TamilNet. Though it is brazenly pro-Tigers, it is a good guide to know the mind of the Tiger leadership tucked away in the safe havens of the Wanni jungles.".

== Threats and murders ==
It has been alleged that members associated with various Sri Lankan political parties have threatened reporters of TamilNet with arrest for "treason", and once hinted, that "uncontrolled extremists might be inspired to perform some extra-judicial killing". (See additional information here)

In 2004, Ramasamy Thurairatnam, a correspondent for the Lakehouse press group and the TamilNet.com news website, claimed that his life was in danger because a local warlord's supporters have formed death squads whose job is to eliminate those who don't support their point of view in the civil conflict. Due to the same threats the BBC’s Tamil and Sinhalese services have stopped broadcasting reports from their correspondents in eastern Sri Lanka.

Body of Taraki Sivaram was found behind the Parliament of Sri Lanka's high security zone. Source:TamilNet.com

Mylvaganam Nimalarajan, a Jaffna based reporter for the BBC, who also filed news reports for TamilNet was shot and killed in 2000. The accused who is an ex-member of Eelam People's Democratic Party (EDPD) headed by cabinet minister Douglas Devananda, a coalition member of many ruling alliances, has been absconding since his bailout.

In 2005, TamilNet's editor Taraki Sivaram, was kidnapped and then shot and killed in Colombo by unknown gunmen. His body was found near the Sri Lankan parliament inside the high security zone. Currently a former member of the People's Liberation Organisation of Tamil Eelam (PLOTE), a minor political organization and a known paramilitary group has been accused in the murder.

The LTTE has accused the government of complicity in his murder, while the government has denied any responsibility. To the accusation that self styled Colonel Karuna, a government aligned regional political party leader and a former LTTE member was personally involved in the murder of Taraki Sivaram, Karuna has categorically denied it.

== Ban in Sri Lanka ==
According to Free Media Movement (FMM), a media rights watchdog from Sri Lanka, on 19 June 2007, on the orders of the Sri Lankan Government, all major Internet service providers in Sri Lanka, blocked users from being able to access the TamilNet website. The FMM said that it is "deeply disturbed" with the news and had the following to say about the ban:

"The ban on Tamilnet is the first instance of what the FMM believes may soon be a slippery slope of web & Internet censorship in Sri Lanka. It is also a regrettable yet revealing extension of this Government’s threats against and coercion of print and electronic media in Sri Lanka since assuming office in late 2005.... The FMM stresses that the danger of censoring the web & Internet is that it gives a Government and State agencies with no demonstrable track record of protecting & strengthening human rights and media freedom flimsy grounds to violate privacy, curtail the free flow of information and restrict freedom of expression"

When questioned by reporters, Government Minister Keheliya Rambukwella said he was not aware of the shutdown but, "We are looking for hackers to disable the Tamilnet but could not find anyone yet." to which FMM responded by saying that it was Cyber terrorism by a government.

The Human Rights group Article 19 in a press release on 20 June 2007, said the following regarding the ban on TamilNet: "Until now, control measures have largely been directed at local media. Applying these measures to the Internet represents a serious escalation which threatens to cut off an important source of independent and alternative news. This not only threatens press freedom but also undermines efforts to address the conflict."

== See also ==
- Afghan Times
- Kurdish Media
- Sudan Tribune
- Savukku
- Tangatawhenua

== Notes ==
- Sri Lankan Tamil Nationalism: Sri Lankan Tamil nationalism is expressed in the political desire by some to form an independent nation state called Tamil Eelam for the minority Sri Lankan Tamil people. Both moderate Tamil United Liberation Front and Tamil National Alliance and militant groups such as LTTE, Eelam People's Revolutionary Liberation Front, PLOTE, EPDP etc. have expressed such political goals either in the past or now.
- Extra Judicial killing: Sri Lankans have suffered a spate of extra judicial killings since the beginning of the civil war. The UN and other international bodies have expressed grave concern over the spate of extra judicial killings in Sri Lanka.
