= Vanniasingham Vigneswaran =

Sri Lankan Tamil politician

President of the Trincomalee District Tamil Peoples' Forum

Personal details
- Born: 1955 Nainativu, Sri Lanka
- Died: 7 April 2006 Trincomalee
- Party: Tamil National Alliance
- Education: Nainativu Central College
- Ethnicity: Sri Lankan Tamil

Vanniasingham Vigneswaran (died in 2006) was a Sri Lankan Tamil politician and president of the Trincomalee District Tamil Peoples' Forum. He was selected as the National List Member of Parliament to replace Joseph Pararajasingham by the Tamil National Alliance who had been assassinated to the Sri Lankan Parliament.

== Death ==
Vigneswaran was shot dead at 9.30 am outside the Bank of Ceylon in Inner Harbor Road between the office of the Senior Superintendent of Police and Trincomalee Harbor Police in Trincomalee in a High Security Zone on 7 April 2006. Vigneswaran had led a campaign against the installation of a Buddha statue close to the Trincomalee central bus stand by the Sri Lankan Army in May 2005. In June 2005 grenades were thrown at his house. On 8 April 2006 the LTTE conferred the title Maamanithar (great human being) on Vigneswaran.
