= Thilak Senasinghe =

Sri Lankan writer (born 1958)

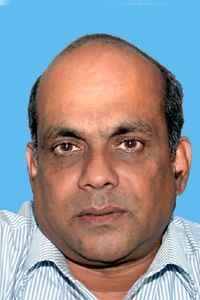
- Born: 22 March 1958 (age 67); Sri Lanka, Colombo,
- Occupation(s): Journalist, Editor-in-Chief
- Employer(s): Rajina Women's Weekly, Lakbima Newspapers Limited
- Spouse: Latha Jayawardhena]
- Children: 1

Thilak Senasinghe is an explorer and research enthusiast of famous mythical beliefs of Sri Lankan culture. He tries to unearth the deep inherent scientific truth embedded in the delusional beliefs and blind faith that have crept into the popular Buddhism of Sri Lanka.

He has published several books, essays and newspaper articles in Sinhala about the psychological facet of the deeply rooted mythical practices in Sri Lanka such as devil possessions, evil spirits, witchcraft, exorcism, sorcery, curses, spells and charms and various other issues connected with occult practices in Sri Lanka.

A journalist by profession, Senasinghe is the editor of the women's weekly, “RAJINA”, a publication of Lakbima Newspapers Ltd, Sri Lanka. He was elected to the Executive Committee of the Sri Lanka Press Association for 2018/19.

== Selected works ==
- Janakantha Mithya Matha
- Manaranjana Mithya Katha
- Kemmura Thenna
- Sudu Paravi Mal
- Agni Chamara
- Avathara Luhubanda
- Sasala Vila, the first novel of its kind which revolves around the character of a so-called ‘Spiritual Healer' who claims to have healing powers. The novel cleverly refutes the fraudulent and hoodwinking practices of this man and the hoax is exposed. The novel throws light on psychological explanations to the unhealthy and false beliefs of this kind and tries to enlighten the innocent people who are misled by the tricksters of the trade.
