= Mylvaganam Nimalrajan =

Tamil journalist of Sri Lanka

- Born: 5 June 1961
- Died: 19 October 2000 (aged 39); Jaffna, Sri Lanka
- Occupation: Journalist
- Spouse: Parimala
- Children: 3

Mylvaganam Nimalrajan, also spelt Mylvaganam Nimalarajan was a senior Jaffna based journalist who was shot dead by gunmen belonging to the paramilitary EPDP in the Sri Lanka Army's high security zone during a curfew on 19 October 2000.

== Career in journalism ==
As a journalist based in the war torn northern Jaffna peninsula during the late 1980s and early 1990s, he reported for various news organisations, including the BBC's Tamil- and Sinhala-language services, Tamil language Virakesari newspaper and Sinhala language Ravaya newspaper as a freelancer. Nimalarajan was one of the few sources of independent news from Jaffna, a strife-torn area where journalists have rarely been allowed free access during the time he reported.

== The attack and his story ==
The assailants came into his home and shot him while he was writing an article. Before they left, they threw two grenades which seriously injured his mother, Lily Mylvaganam, who was 58 at the time, and his nephew, Prasanna Jegathas, who was 11. They also cut his father, Canapathypillai Mylvaganam, 65 then, with a long knife, under his left ear and twirled a vein, which left a mark on his face. Nimalarajan's older sister, Pramarani Jegathas, heard noises. When she came into the room, it was dark, she felt her feet stick to the floor. When she turned the light on, she found the floor covered with blood from her younger brother. When they went to the hospital, the father, mother and his nephew, who was his older sister's son, were taken to the emergency ward. Pramarani had her younger brother's body, across her lap, crying the whole time.

== Why he was killed ==
According to Committee to Protect Journalists, it suspected that Nimalarajan's reporting on vote-rigging and intimidation during the 2000 parliamentary elections in Jaffna led to his murder.

== Who killed him ==
One of the Tamil parties, the Tamil United Liberation Front, issued a statement indicating that it suspects the EPDP, a government aligned political and military group of carrying out the murder. A TULF spokesperson said the immediate reason was that Nimalarajan had written about ballot rigging in the Kayts islands, one of the EPDP's strongholds, and in Jaffna town. The EPDP has denied any involvement, saying that the TULF's statement was a baseless allegation.

The Student Association of Jaffna University issued a leaflet headlined Is this the Rehabilitation in Jaffna? directly accusing the EPDP. The party which got the ministry of Rehabilitation (North) has rewarded the people with a murder, it stated. Nimalarajan was murdered to cover up the genocide of Tamils by the Sri Lankan Army and the perpetuation of the group's anarchic rule.

Following 10 October election, Nimalarajan reportedly told colleagues that he had earned the wrath of the EPDP, which held him at least partly responsible for its failure to win more votes in Jaffna. He said that he was worried about his safety after receiving several threats.

The journalist lived in a high security zone making it difficult for his killers to get to his home and leave without being detected. The area is tightly controlled by military checkpoints and a special umbrella security system. Moreover, the murder took place during curfew hours. Reporters Without Borders' also said in their 2003 annual report that most of the suspects arrested were EPDP cadres, and though had not directly admitted the murder, they had implicated each other.

== Government response and results of investigation ==
The then government immediately launched an investigation. 10 people were detained, most of them being EPDP cadres. Even though most of them implicated each other in the murder, the authorities blocked the case for more than a year. 2 suspects, David Michael Collins and a certain Vishua, were released however. Their passports were not confiscated, even though past EPDP cadres, had fled the country. By the end of 2002, none of the suspects were brought to trial. Police had still not finished giving the results back from tests on crucial pieces of evidence found at the scene of the murder; firearms taken from the EPDP, fingerprints found on a bicycle near the scene of the murder, bullet casings and the remains of a grenade. This was all reported by Reports Without Borders, a neutral organisation promoting free media.

== See also ==
- Sri Lankan civil war
