= Murasoli (Sri Lanka) =

Sri Lankan Tamil language newspaper

- Type: Daily
- Owner: Sinnadurai Thiruchelvam
- Language: Tamil
- Headquarters: Jaffna, Sri Lanka

Murasoli was a Tamil language newspaper. It was known for its independent line and opposing the Indo-Sri Lanka Accord as did not consult the Tamils. It was founded by Sinnadurai Thiruchelvam. He was arrested multiple times by the IPKF and his teenage son Ahilan Thiruchelvam was murdered by the IPKF backed EPRLF. He and his wife went into hiding in Colombo moving from place to place for security. Murasoli was closed down by the Indian Peace Keeping Force with all its copies confiscated, its journalists and workers arrested and its printing machinery destroyed in 1987.
