= Prageeth Eknaligoda =

Missing Sri-Lankan political analyst and journalist

Prageeth Ranjan Ekneligoda
- Born: April 9, 1960; Sri Lanka
- Disappeared: 24 January 2010 (aged 49); Sri Lanka
- Status: Missing for 16 years, 9 months and 1 day
- Occupations: Political Writer, Cartoonist Journalist
- Spouse: Sandya Eknelygoda

Prageeth Ekneligoda (born April 9, 1960) is a Sri Lankan cartoonist, political analyst and journalist. He was reported missing on January 24, 2010, two days before the Presidential polls in Sri Lanka when the country was under the Presidency of Mahinda Rajapaksa and has not been seen since. He actively participated in the presidential campaign of common opposition candidate Sarath Fonseka while working as a freelance journalist for a pro-opposition website Lankaenews.com. Members of his family believe he has been abducted by pro-government supporters because he was investigating the alleged use of chemical weapons, charges that were denied by the government of Sri Lanka. In 2009 Amnesty International released information regarding the circumstances surrounding his disappearance. Reporters Without Borders has issued a statement concerning him. The investigation into his disappearance is being led by the Colombo Crimes Division. He is married to human rights activist Sandya Eknaligoda who was given an International Women of Courage Award in 2017 for her campaigns. The International Federation of Journalists lists his case in its campaign "Without a Trace" amongst the top 10 cases of enforced disappearances of media workers which still remains untraced in Asia Pacific.

== Disappearance ==
Eknaligoda was investigating the alleged use of chemical weapons against civilians by the Sri Lankan army in the fight against the LTTE. He left his office on the evening of January 24, 2010, saying that he had to meet an old friend. He has not been seen since. He had earlier been abducted by a white van in August 2009 and released the next day.

== Government response ==
His wife Sandya Eknaligoda, his family and several activist groups have accused the Sri Lankan government of being directly responsible for his disappearance. At a meeting in the United Nations Convention Against Torture in Geneva, Sri Lanka's then Attorney General Mohan Peiris dismissed the charges against government and said that Eknaligoda has sought asylum abroad. But when questioned in the court later, he told that he does not remember who the source of his information was and that “only god knows” the whereabouts of Eknaligoda.

=== Reappearance allegations ===
On June 5, 2013, a member of parliament claimed that Eknaligoda was living in France. Several Sri Lankan journalists in exile in France, including Manjula Wediwardana, whom that Member of parliament alleged to have taken him to meet Prageeth, vehemently denied the claims that Prageeth is living in hiding in France. French embassy in Colombo too denied any claims that Prageeth is living in France.

Free Media Movement (FMM) Convener Sunil Jayasekara in a statement on the MPs allegations told

“We think the MP is using Parliamentary privileges and trying to mislead the people. He is claiming that a journalist had introduced Mr. Ekneligoda to him when he visited France in January this year. However the journalist Manjula Wediwardana has sent an e-mail to us saying he never met the MP in France or introduced any Mr. Ekneligoda to him,”.

== 2015 Investigation probe ==
In March 2015, the government launched a probe into the disappearance of Eknaligoda, but his wife expressed dissatisfaction over the government's actions. In January 2016, Bodu Bala Sena leader was arrested after he disrupted court proceedings on Eknaligoda disappearance

== Later ==
=== Alleged leader of death squad ===
Major Prabath Bulathwatte, who is alleged to be the leader of a death squad that assassinated Ekneligoda, was investigating Jihadists networks in Sri Lanka at the time of his arrest and his removal from the post is believed to have allowed the 2019 Sri Lanka Easter Bombings to happen. Thus he was reinstated to his former position in May 2019 and given control of a special team directly under the Army Commander Mahesh Senanayake.

== See also ==
- Forced disappearance
- Human rights in Sri Lanka
- List of kidnappings
- List of people who disappeared mysteriously (2000–present)
- Enforced disappearances in Sri Lanka
