= Champika Liyanaarachchi =

Champika Liyanaarachchi (Sinhala: චම්පිකා ලියනආරච්චි is a journalist, an academic and the first woman to be the editor of a daily newspaper in Sri Lanka. Liyanaarachchi was the Editor of Sri Lanka's largest selling independent English daily, the Daily Mirror from January 2007 to January 2015. She stepped down from editor post in January 2015 on completing eight years as editor. Currently she serves as the Consultant editor of the paper.

== Career ==
Liyanaarachchi was appointed the Editor-In-Chief of Daily Mirror in January 2007 and under her the Daily Mirror became the first ever Sri Lankan newspaper to break news on web 24/7 dailymirror.lk as well as on iPad. Besides, in 2009 she started Mirror's Tamil news website tamilmirror.lk, and also the Daily Mirror mobile breaking news service with two mobile phone operators.

Three years after taking over duties as Chief Editor, Liyanaarachchi managed to double the circulation of the Daily Mirror. The Sri Lanka Representative for Paris-based Reporters Sans Frontieres (Reporters without Borders) from 2003-2006, Liyanaarachchi was a member of the Board of Directors of the Commonwealth Journalists Association (CJA) from 2003 – 2012. She was a speaker at the 2009 World Editors’ Forum as well.

== Academic ==
Liyanaarachchi has a bachelor's degree in English literature from the University of Sri Jayewardenepura. The University of Sri Jayewardenepura offered her a youth fellowship after she became the student to get the highest marks for English literature in the first year. This fellowship, granted to the university by the Japanese government, saw her travelling to South Africa, Tanzania, UAE and Japan within a span of three months. She was the president of the English Literary Association of the university and joined the Mirror editorial while still being a second year student.

Liyanaarachchi also holds a master's degree’ Degree in Conflict Resolution (MCR) from the University of Colombo.

She was a lecturer in Human Rights at the Faculty of Graduate Studies, University of Colombo.

== Awards ==
- Liyanaarachchi is a Winner of Zonta Woman of Achievement in Media 2004 award.
- In 2016 the University of Sri Jayewardenapura presented her with an award of excellence for her contribution to media in Sri Lanka.
