= Taraki Sivaram =

Tamil journalist of Sri Lanka

Maamanithar Taraki Sivaram
- தராக்கி சிவராம்
- Dharmeratanam Sivaram
- Born: Dharmeratnam Sivaram; 11 August 1959; Batticaloa, Sri Lanka
- Died: 28 April 2005 (aged 45); Colombo, Sri Lanka
- Occupations: Journalist, writer, author
- Title: Mr.
- Spouse: Herly Yogaranjini Poopalapillai
- Children: Vaishnavi, Vaitheki, and Andrew Seralaathan
- Website: http://www.tamilnet.com

Taraki Sivaram or Dharmeratnam Sivaram (11 August 1959 – 28 April 2005) was a popular Tamil journalist of Sri Lanka. He was kidnapped by four men in a white van on 28 April 2005, in front of the Bambalapitya police station. His body was found the next day in the district of Himbulala, near the Parliament of Sri Lanka. He had been beaten and shot in the head.

== Biography ==
Sivaram, the well-known and controversial political analyst and a senior editor for Tamilnet.com, was born on 11 August 1959 in Batticaloa, Sri Lanka, to a prominent local family with significant land holdings and political connections near the village of Akkaraipattu. He was educated at St. Michael's College National School, and later at Pembroke and Aquinas Colleges in Colombo. He was accepted into the University of Peradeniya in 1982 but soon dropped out due to tensions associated with the first phases of Sri Lanka civil war in 1983 (see Black July pogrom).

On 8 September 1988 he married Herly Yogaranjini Poopalapillai of Batticaloa. They eventually had three children: Vaishnavi, Vaitheki, and Seralaathan.

=== Political activity ===
In 1982 Sivaram joined the Gandhian Movement, then a front organisation for the People's Liberation Organisation of Tamil Eelam (PLOTE), one of the many Tamil organisations. Soon after Sri Lanka's ethnic conflict erupted into civil war in 1983, Sivaram, under the alias SR, became a PLOTE militant. In 1988, a year after the Indo-Lankan accord was signed, Uma Maheswaran, PLOTE's leader, appointed Sivaram General Secretary of the Democratic People's Liberation Front (DPLF), the organisation's registered political party. Sivaram left PLOTE in 1989, after disagreeing with Maheswaran's attempts to establish firmer relations with the Janatha Vimukthi Peramuna (JVP) and because of the group's involvement in an abortive coup in the Maldives.

=== His career as a journalist ===
In 1988 with the encouragement of fellow journalist, activist and actor Richard De Zoysa he became a reporter for the UN-funded Inter Press Service (IPS), for whom De Zoysa was a correspondent. In 1989, when The Island newspaper needed a political analyst, De Zoysa suggested Sivaram's name. The Island editor, Gamini Weerakon, proposed tharaka or star in Sinhalese as Sivaram's pen name but a sub-editor accidentally printed Taraki instead, giving birth to Sivaram's pen name. In 1990 Sivaram helped identify Richard De Zoysa's body after De Zoysa was abducted from his home and killed.

=== Popularity ===
Taraki's articles reflected his personal style combined with accurate and inside information, explaining military, political, strategic and tactical aspects of all sides in Sri Lanka's complex conflict. Moreover, his reading in military science and political philosophy benefited his literacy greatly.

By the early 1990s, Sivaram's Taraki column had become a must read for many interested in Sri Lanka. As a freelance journalist, Sivaram eventually wrote for many newspapers including The Island, The Sunday Times, Tamil Times of London, The Daily Mirror, and the Tamil newspaper Virakesari. In 1997, Sivaram helped Tamilnet.com reorganise itself into a Tamil news agency with its own string of reporters, and remained a senior editor there until his death. He filed his last story for Tamilnet.com at 7:30 PM on the night he was murdered.

=== Collaboration with academics ===
Due to his grasp of Tamil politics and literature and Sri Lanka's complex history, he was able to collaborate with many academics. Hence, Sivaram collaborated with historians, political scientists, anthropologists, policy experts, and geographers from many of Sri Lanka's universities and think tanks, as well as with foreign and foreign-based scholars from (among other schools around the world) the University of Colorado, the University of South Carolina, and Clark University. His most prominent collaborators were Professor Mark Whitaker, an anthropologist with the University of South Carolina, and Dr. Jude Fernando of Clark University.

=== Involvement with NGOs ===
In the mid-1990s many governments and human rights non-governmental organisations (NGOs) collaborated with Sivaram for advice on local political and military matters. He widely travelled in Europe, Asia, and North America and equally well known to governments, the diplomatic community, and human rights activists. He was killed just ahead of a scheduled trip to Japan to consult with the Japanese government regarding the then current peace process.

=== Threat to his life ===
When Sivaram started receiving death threats, he was requested by his friends and colleagues to move himself and his family out of Sri Lanka. He always refused to leave.

Where else should I die but here? he often declared. Yet in 2004 the police twice searched Sivaram's home, and various groups political parties such as the Jathika Hela Urumaya and Janatha Vimukthi Peramuna in Sri Lanka publicly threatened him as a Liberation Tigers of Tamil Eelam (LTTE) activist and a terrorist sympathiser.

=== International reaction ===
After his death was reported, governments such as Japan, and international organisations such as Reporters Without Borders and UNESCO officials publicly condemned his murder and requested the government of Sri Lanka to investigate the murder.

=== Accusations and investigation ===
The LTTE accused the government in complicity of his murder. Prior to his murder state owned media outlets since 2001 have accused him of being an LTTE spy, leading to the conclusion by some that his death was officially sanctioned (see State terrorism in Sri Lanka). One year later a Tamil man belonging to the PLOTE organisation was apprehended but eyewitnesses refused to identify him as one of the kidnappers. No more activity regarding the government investigation is available.

Reporters Without Borders, a pres freedom organisation, said "The Sri Lankan authorities have regrettably demonstrated a complete lack of will to solve cases of murders and physical attacks against journalists."

== Controversy ==
Sivaram was also accused by human rights activists such as Rajan Hoole who was critical of Sivaram's role as the Tamilnet.com's editor, that he was involved in the murder of two PLOTE dissidents during his days as a Tamil militant. This report was denied by fellow journalist David Jeyaraj from Canada. However, some activists and writers associated with former PLOTE dissidents have disagreed with Jeyaraj's conclusions.

Jeyaraj wrote that Karuna, an LTTE splinter group leader and a member of a government aligned political-military organisation was personally involved in the murder of Sivaram. Karuna has denied this allegation categorically and blamed the LTTE leadership for his murder in addition to those of Lakshman Kadirgamar and Kumar Ponnambalam. After the arrest of one suspect, the investigation was abandoned.

== Legacy ==
Sivaram following his death, became a cause célèbre for Tamil activists and journalists worldwide. He is revered for his work which focused not just the plight of the Eelam Tamils but helping oppressed people all over the world empower themselves and get out from oppression. His colleague Dr. Jude Fernando, of Clark University, was quoted saying:

He will be an irreplaceable loss to the academic and human rights community around the world

Eelam poet Kaasi Ananthan mentioned him as a neutral journalist who was not driven by racial emotions. He was posthumously honored as Maamanithar, the highest civilian honor in the former state of Tamil Eelam by LTTE Leader Velupillai Prabhakaran.

In 2015, the 10th anniversary of his death was observed, in various parts of Tamil Nadu and Sri Lanka. Also a documentary film on Taraki's work was released on the World Press Freedom Day at the Chennai Press Club, Chennai.

== See also ==
- Tamilnet
- Interview with Dharmaratnam Sivaram

== Collection of writings ==
- 1991 An Insider's analysis of the Ethnic Conflict in Sri Lanka
- Collection of his writings at Tamilnation.org
