= Sudar Oli =

Defunct Sri Lankan Tamil-language newspaper

- Type: Daily newspaper
- Owner: Uthayan Group of Newspapers
- Publisher: New Vision Media Syndicate (Private) Limited
- Editor-in-chief: R. Sivarajah
- Editor: T. Premanath
- Managing editor: E. Saravanapavan
- Founded: 10 September 2000
- Ceased publication: May 2018
- Political alignment: Neutral
- Language: Tamil
- Headquarters: 85 Jayantha Mallimarachchi Mawatha, Colombo, Sri Lanka
- Sister newspapers: Uthayan

Sudar Oli (Tamil: சுடர் ஒளி Cuṭar Oḷi) was a Tamil language Sri Lankan daily newspaper published in Colombo. It was founded in 2000 as a weekly newspaper and became a daily publication in 2001. It was associated with the Uthayan Group of Newspapers and was the sister newspaper of the Jaffna-based Uthayan.

The newspaper ceased publication in May 2018. The 2018 Annual Report of the Press Complaints Commission of Sri Lanka also lists Sudar Oli among newspapers that ceased publication.

== History ==
Sudar Oli was founded in Colombo on 10 September 2000 as a weekly newspaper. It became a daily newspaper on 29 October 2001. Nadesapillai Vithyatharan became the paper's editor in 2002.

In July 2006 Sudar Oli and Thinakkural were forced to stop distribution in Batticaloa District and Ampara District after receiving threatening phone calls allegedly from a government-backed paramilitary group headed by Karuna Amman.

Both newspapers later resumed distribution in the affected districts, although circulation had fallen.

Editor N. Vithyatharan was arrested by police without a warrant on 26 February 2009 while attending a funeral in Mount Lavinia. He was subsequently released on 24 April 2009 after the Colombo Crimes Division informed the court that there was no evidence connecting him to an air raid on Colombo.

== Closure ==
Sudar Oli ceased publication in May 2018.

The Media Ownership Monitor Sri Lanka identifies Sudar Oli as one of the newspapers published by the New Uthayan Publication group and records that the newspaper ceased operations in May 2018.

The Press Complaints Commission of Sri Lanka's 2018 Annual Report independently lists Sudar Oli, described as a Tamil-language daily/weekly newspaper, among newspapers that ceased publication.

== Attacks ==
Sudar Oli and its employees were subject to numerous attacks during its period of publication.

- News photographer Yathurshan Premachchandran was attacked by activists from the Janatha Vimukthi Peramuna (JVP) party on 23 August 2005 while covering a JVP demonstration in front of Fort Railway Station in Colombo.
- Two grenades were thrown into the advertising office of Sudar Oli and Uthayan in Wellawatte, Colombo, on 20 August 2005, but failed to explode.
- Two grenades were thrown into the newspaper's offices in Grandpass, Colombo, on 29 August 2005, killing security guard David Selvaratnam and injuring three others.
- Two parliamentary reporters were attacked while waiting for a bus on 30 August 2005.
- Journalist Subramaniyam Sugirdharajan was shot dead in Trincomalee on 24 January 2006. The day before his death, he had written an article in Sudar Oli concerning abuses attributed to the Eelam People's Democratic Party.

== See also ==
- List of newspapers in Sri Lanka
- Uthayan
