= Virakesari =

Sri Lankan Tamil language newspaper

- Virakesari (வீரகேசரி) – The Premiere Tamil Daily in Sri Lanka
- Type: Daily newspaper
- Format: Broadsheet
- Owner: Express Newspapers (Ceylon) Pvt Ltd
- Founder: PPR. Subramanian chettiar
- Publisher: Express Newspapers (Ceylon) Pvt Ltd
- Language: Tamil
- Headquarters: Colombo, Sri Lanka
- Website: www.virakesari.lk

Virakesari (Tamil: வீரகேசரி, romanized: vīrakēcari) is one of the leading Tamil daily newspapers in Sri Lanka. It is the oldest and the largest circulated Tamil Newspaper in Sri Lanka. Virakesari is owned by Express Newspapers (Ceylon) (Private) Limited, a leading print and web media organization in Sri Lanka.

== History ==
The Online Division of Express Newspapers launched virakesari.lk, a 24x7 breaking news website, in 2002, and in 2005 they launched Virakesari's E-paper, which was the world's first Tamil E-paper. The websites boasts of over 2.5 million hits from across the world. Virakesari also plays a significant role in the field of social media having large numbers of young audience engaged on their websites. The Alexa rank of this website is under 250.

Annalakshmi Rajadurai joined Virakesari in 1962, when women were unusual in Sri Lankan newspaper journalism. She stayed with the newspaper for decades.

Virakesari was voted the "Best Designed Newspaper" at the "Journalism Awards for Excellence 2005" by the Editors Guild and the Sri Lanka Press Institute. In 2010 virakesari.lk won the title of "Sri Lankas' Favorite Tamil Website" in polling conducted by bestweb.lk.
