= Free Media Movement =

The Free Media Movement (FMM) is a media freedom watchdog organization of journalists from Sri Lanka.

It evolved out of the standing committee of journalists, which was formed in late 1991. The standing committee was formed by a group of journalists and media personnel as a reaction to the then government of Sri Lanka introducing a Media Commission.

Since then FMM has been active in all areas relating to media freedom, defending the rights of journalists and media people. It also has called for reform of legislation, agitating against censorship and intimidation of media personnel and standing for broad principles of democratic and human rights.

It also has developed an extensive network of links with other media freedom and human rights groups locally and internationally.

The Sri Lankan defense ministry alleged that FMM is a controversial organization. It has been accused of unprofessionalism and partiality.

== See also ==
- Freedom of the press in Sri Lanka
