= Sri Sabaratnam =

Sri Lankan Tamil rebel

- சிறி சபாரத்தினம்
- Born: 28 August 1952
- Died: 6 May 1986 (aged 33); Kondavil, Sri Lanka
- Other names: Tall Sri
- Years active: –1986
- Organization: Tamil Eelam Liberation Organization

Sundaram Sri Sabaratnam (Tamil: சிறி சபாரத்தினம்; 28 August 1952 – 6 May 1986) was a Sri Lankan Tamil rebel and leader of the Tamil Eelam Liberation Organization (TELO), a separatist Tamil militant organisation in Sri Lanka.

== Early life ==
Sabaratnam was born on 28 August 1952. Whilst in government custody between 1972 and 1975, his jailer nicknamed him "Tall Sri" to differentiate him from another Sri in custody.

== Neervely bank robbery ==
On 25 March 1981, a People's Bank van returning to Jaffna after collecting cash in Vadamarachchi was robbed of Rs. 8 million on the Jaffna-Point Pedro Road in Neervely. N. Thangavelu (alias Thangadurai), S. Yogachandran (alias Kuttimani), Selvadurai Sivasubramaniam (alias Devan), Navaratnarah (Nadarajah) Sivapatham (alias Sivapalan Master) and Vythilingam Nadesathasan (Nadesudasan) were arrested and charged in connection with the robbery. Sabaratnam was charged in absentia. The trial at Colombo High Court commenced on 2 November 1982 and on 24 February 1983 all six defendants were found guilty and sentenced to life in prison.

Sabaratnam became leader of TELO after the killing of Thangathurai and Kuttimani during the Welikada prison massacre in July 1983.

== Death ==
In April 1986, the Liberation Tigers of Tamil Eelam (LTTE) banned TELO and set about killing its leader Sri Sabaratnam. Sabaratnam went on the run, fleeing from TELO's main base in Kalviyankadu to Neervely, then to Kopay and finally to Kondavil. The LTTE found out that he was in Kondavil and they, led by Kittu, cordoned off the area and started a house-to-house search, using loud hailers to warn local residents not to shelter Sabaratnam. On 6 May 1986, (Note: Asian Tribune and Tamil Times state that he was killed on 6 May 1986; Sri-TELO say 5 May 1986; Marks and Wilson say April or May 1986; and Wickramasinghe says April 1986.) the LTTE discovered Sabaratnam in a tobacco field and Kittu shot him in the leg to prevent him escaping. Sabaratnam pleaded with Kittu for his life, but Kittu shot him 28 times using a machine gun. Sabaratnam's bullet ridden body was displayed at Kondavil bus stand before being handed over to his family.
