= Welikada Prison =

Maximum security prison in Colombo, Sri Lanka

- Location within Central Colombo

General information
- Type: Prison
- Location: Welikada, Colombo, Sri Lanka
- Coordinates: 6°55′19″N 79°52′49″E
- Construction started: 1841
- Completed: 1841
- Client: British Government, Sri Lankan Government

The Welikada Prison (Sinhala: වැලිකඩ බන්ධනාගාරය; also known as the Magazine Prison) is a maximum-security prison and the largest prison in Sri Lanka. It was built in 1841 by the British colonial government under Governor Campbell. The prison covers an area of 48 acres (190,000 m^{2}). It is overcrowded with about 1700 detainees exceeding the actual number that could be accommodated. The prison also has a gallows (unused since 1959) and its own hospital. The prison is administered by the Department of Prisons.

Following the attempted military coup in 1962, the arrested military and police officers were remanded pending trial in a special section at Welikada prison called the Magazine Section. To guard these officers, a special security detachment called the composite guard was selected from the Ceylon Light Infantry, with Major A Hulangamuwa in charge.

== 2012 Prison riot ==
In November 2012, 27 people died in clashes between inmates and prison guards.

== Core functions ==
- Detention of prisoners on first conviction
- Categorization of convicted prisoners on admission and transferring them to relevant prisons
- Detention of condemned prisoners
- Production of suspects to Kesbewa and Moratuwa courts
- Provision of vocational training to prisoners
- Launching of welfare and rehabilitation programs for prisoners

== Relocation ==
It is proposed to relocate the prison to Horana by 2024. The existing complex will be opened for investments.

== Notable inmates ==
- D S Senanayake - National hero, independence activist and first prime minister of Ceylon
- F R Senanayake - National hero and independence activist
- Captain Henry Pedris - National hero and martyr of the independence movement
- Anagarika Dharmapala - National hero, independence activist and leading figure of the Buddhist revival
- Colonel F. C. de Saram - A leader of the attempted military corp of 1962
- Talduwe Somarama - The assassin of S. W. R. D. Bandaranaike, who was executed in 1962
- Bombardier Gratien Fernando - Leader of the Cocos islands mutiny
- Douglas Devananda - Tamil politician, cabinet minister and the paramilitary leader of the EPDP
- Sepala Ekanayake - Airline hijacker
- Sarath Fonseka - Former Commander of the Army and Chief of Defence Staff who led the army for a win against the Tamil Tigers
- Selvarajah Yogachandran - also known as Kuttimani was one of the leaders of former Tamil militant organization TELO, killed in Welikada prison massacre
- Nadarajah Thangathurai - one of the leaders of former Tamil militant organization TELO, killed in Welikada prison massacre

== Scouting ==
The world's first prison Scout Group registered by Imperial Scout Headquarters started at Welikada Prison in 1926.

== See also ==
- Welikada prison massacre
