= Pon Sivakumaran =

Sri Lankan rebel

- பொன் சிவகுமாரன்
- Born: Ponnuthurai Sivakumaran; 26 August 1950
- Died: 5 June 1974 (aged 23)
- Other name: Urumpirai Sivakumaran

Ponnuthurai Sivakumaran (Tamil: பொன்னுத்துரை சிவகுமாரன்; 26 September 1950 – 5 June 1974) was a Sri Lankan Tamil rebel and the first Tamil militant to commit suicide by swallowing cyanide.

== Early life and family ==
Sivakumaran was born on 26 September 1950. (Note: Another source gives Sivakumaran's date of birth as 26 August 1950.) He was the son of Ponnuthurai, principal of Urumpirai Hindu Tamil Vidyasalai, and Annalakshmi. Sivakumaran's father and mother were both supporters of the Illankai Tamil Arasu Kachchi and its leader S. J. V. Chelvanayakam which influenced Sivakumaran's own political beliefs. Sivakumaran had two brothers and a sister. He was educated at Urumpirai Hindu College and Jaffna Hindu College. After school he joined Kokkuvil Junior Technical College but dropped out after two months.

== Militancy ==
Sivakumaran became a supporter of an armed struggle. In 1969 a small group of militant Tamil youths from Valvettithurai formed an underground group. The group was known as the Thangadurai Group and was led by Thangadurai and Kuttimani. The group would later be known as the Tamil Liberation Organisation (TLO). Other members of the group included V. Prabhakaran, Sri Sabaratnam, Sivakumaran, Periya Sothi, Chinna Sothi, Chetti and Kannadi. In 1971 Sivakumaran joined the Tamil Student Federation (Note: The Tamil Student Federation was also known as the Tamil Student Union (TSU), Tamil Students' League (TSL) and Tamil Student Organisation (TSO). The TSF was renamed Tamil Youth League (Tamil Ilaignar Peravai) in 1973.) (Tamil Manavar Peravai) (TSF), which had been formed in 1970 by Ponnuthurai Sathiyaseelan. Sivakumaran later left the TSF and formed his own group which was known as the Sivakumaran Group.

Whilst speaking at an event at Colombo Hindu College in July 1970 Deputy Minister of Cultural Affairs Somaweera Chandrasiri, a Sinhalese politician, claimed that Sinhalese and Tamil cultures were linked. Sivakumaran was angered by this. In September 1970 Sivakumaran tried to assassinate Chandrasiri as he visited Urumpirai Hindu College. Sivakumaran placed a time bomb under Chandrasiri's car and quietly slipped away but when the bomb exploded no one was in the car. No one suspected Sivakumaran.

Mayor of Jaffna Alfred Duraiappah was a member of the governing Sri Lanka Freedom Party and its chief organiser in Jaffna District. Tamil militants considered Duraiappah to be a traitor and government collaborator. In February 1971 Sivakumaran tried to assassinate Duraiappah by throwing a hand grenade on to Duraiappah's car which was parked on Second Cross Road in Jaffna. Duraiappah was not inside the car at the time. This time the police found out that Sivakumaran was involved and started a manhunt for him.

In 1972 and 1973 the police arrested many Tamil youths suspected of being militants. As a result, Sivakumaran's militant activities slowed down. In January 1974 nine civilians were massacred by the police at the World Tamil Conference in Jaffna. Tamil militants blamed the government and Posts and Telecommunications Minister Chelliah Kumarasuriar for the massacre. Sivakumaran however blamed Duraiappah and ASP S. K. Chandrasekera for the massacre and sought vengeance. Fearing torture if he was arrested, Sivakumaran started carrying cyanide pills. On 4 June 1974 TSF (Note: Another source states that the Tamil New Tigers tried to rob the Kopay People's Bank on 4 June 1974.) militants including Sivakumaran attempted to rob the People's Bank in Kopay. As the bank's police guards gave chase, a cornered Sivakumaran swallowed a vial of cyanide, dying instantly. (Note: According to another source, Sub Inspector Wijesundera, the Officer In Charge of Kopay police station, had followed Sivakumaran after receiving intelligence that the Kopay People's Bank was going to be attacked. Sivakumaran tried to shoot Wijesundera but misfired whereupon Wijesundera captured Sivakumaran who then swallowed cyanide.) (Note: According to another source Sivakumaran didn't die instantly but was taken to hospital where his stomach was pumped out but he nevertheless died.) Sivakumaran became the first Tamil militant to die in such a manner and the first Tamil "martyr". A large public funeral was held which was attended by senior Tamil politicians. Sivakumaran's body was taken in procession from Jaffna hospital to Urumpirai.

Liberation Tigers of Tamil Eelam leader V. Prabhakaran would later claim that Sivakumaran's death was the inspiration for LTTE cadres carrying cyanide capsules as standard equipment. A bronze statue of Sivakumaran was put up in Urumpirai but during the 1977 anti-Tamil riots the statue was destroyed by the police. The edifice was demolished by the army during Operation Riviresa. The statue was re-built in 1999. 5 June is commemorated as Tamil Students' Day of Uprising or Sivakumaran Day in the Sri Lankan Tamil diaspora.
