= Ganeshanathan Jeganathan =

Indian political writer

- Born: 28 October 1956 (age 69)
- Known for: Founding member of Tamil Eelam Liberation Organization

Ganeshanathan Jeganathan (born 28 October 1956, in Thondaimanaru) was a political writer and one of the members of former Tamil militant organization Tamil Eelam Liberation Organization (TELO). He was arrested and sentenced to death and was killed in the 1983 Welikada prison massacre during the Black July riots in Sri Lanka, along with the TELO leaders Nadarajah Thangathurai & Selvarajah Yogachandran.

== See also ==
- Nadarajah Thangathurai
- Selvarajah Yogachandran
