= Tamil Eelam (1984–2009) =

De facto independent state

- 1984–2009
- Flag Emblem
- Anthem: Eruthu Paar Kodi
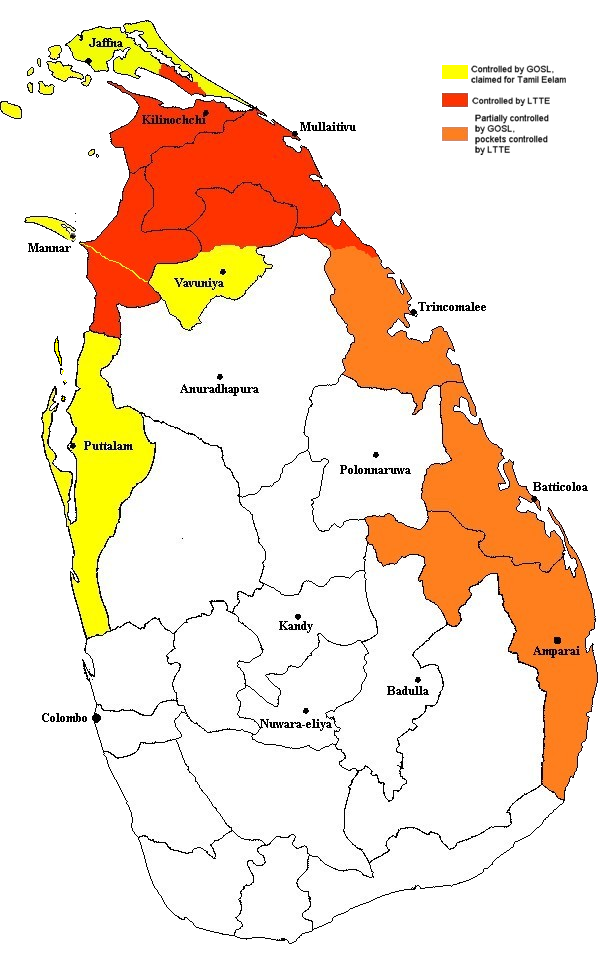
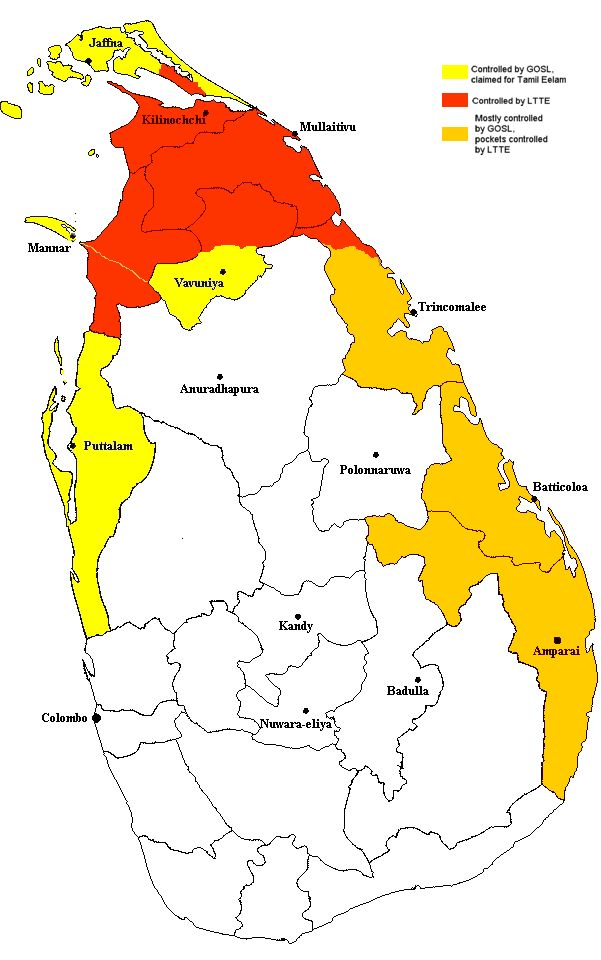
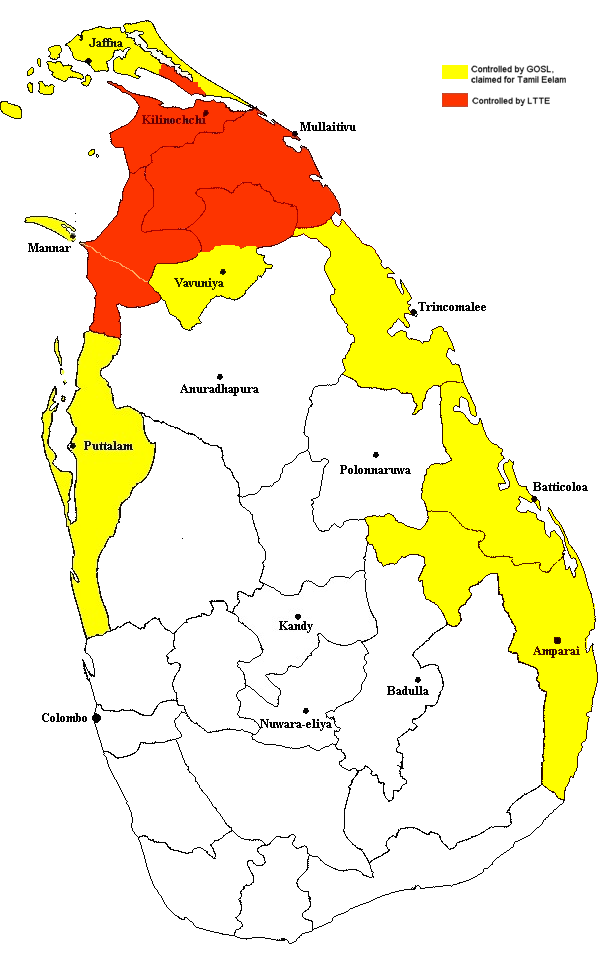
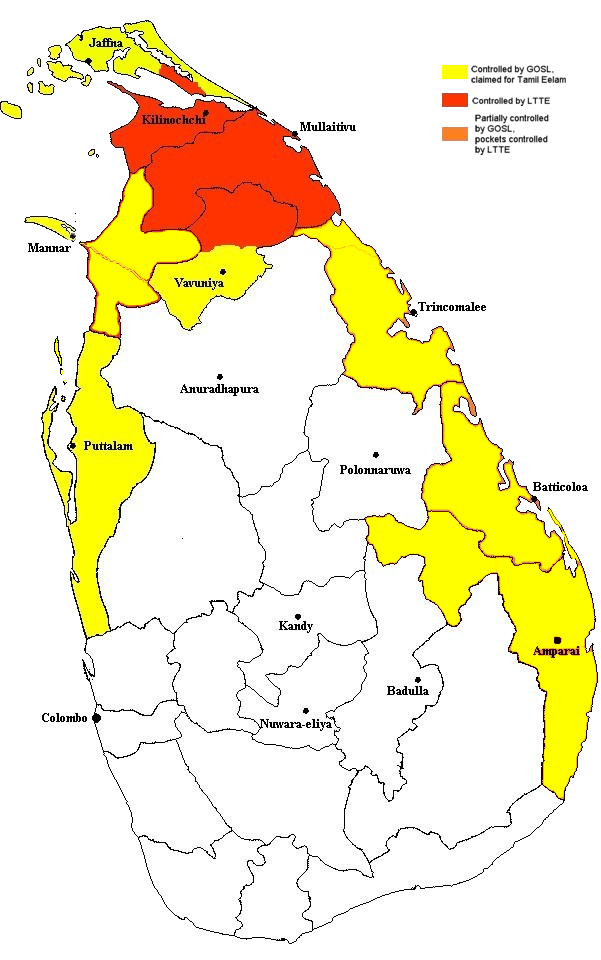
- Status: Quasi-state
- Capital: Kilinochchi (de facto) (Note: Between 1990 and 1996 and again from 1998 till 2009.)
- Government: Civil administration (per LTTE); Authoritarian military government (de facto)
- President and Prime Minister of Tamil Eelam and Chairman of the Central Governing Committee
  - 1984–2009: Velupillai Prabhakaran (Note: Also served as Supreme Leader/Supreme Commander of the Liberation Tigers of Tamil Eelam)
- Historical era: Sri Lankan civil war
  - Established: 1984
  - Disestablished: 18 May 2009

Area
  - Total: 15,000 km^{2} (5,800 sq mi)

Population
  - 2004 estimate: 538,000
- GDP (nominal): Unknown year of estimate
  - Total: 100 million–1.5 billion
- Currency: Sri Lankan rupee
Preceded by	Succeeded by
Democratic Socialist Republic of Sri Lanka	Democratic Socialist Republic of Sri Lanka

Tamil Eelam was a de facto independent state administered by the Liberation Tigers of Tamil Eelam (LTTE) that existed from 1984 to 2009, with Kilinochchi serving as its capital. It controlled substantial territory in Sri Lanka's Northern and Eastern provinces and had a population of approximately 538,000 people in 2004. The government of Tamil Eelam provided state-like functions, a bank system, and a judiciary system. In 2009, following the end of the Sri Lankan civil war, Tamil Eelam ceased to exist.

== History ==
=== Territorial control ===
In 1984, during the Sri Lankan civil war, Tamil Eelam was first established as a de facto state. By 2004, Tamil Eelam controlled approximately 44% of the total land area of the Northern and Eastern provinces of Sri Lanka, including inland waters. Most of this territory consisted of jungle, with the remainder being predominantly rural.

Tamil Eelam-controlled areas contained no municipal or urban councils, only town and village councils. Tamil Eelam exercised full control over two of the eight administrative districts in the two provinces. In 2004, Tamil Eelam was slightly more than 8,000 km², compared with nearly 19,000 km² for the combined Northern and Eastern provinces. In 2004, Tamil Eelam had an estimated population of 538,000, representing approximately 3% of Sri Lanka's total population. By July 2006, Tamil Eelam's territorial control increased to approximately 15,000 km². After the Battle of Chalai, the LTTE-controlled area decreased to 200 square kilometers

In 2009, following the end of the Sri Lankan civil war, the de facto independent state of Tamil Eelam also ceased to exist.

== Government ==
In 1984, the same year Tamil Eelam was established, a de facto government was also established under its control, with Kilinochchi as its administrative capital. The government was described as "very hierarchical", with two wings, a political and military wing. The political and military wing were both controlled by the "Central Governing Committee", led by Vellupiali Prabhakaran. The political wing provided state functions such as courts, regional police departments, a human rights organization, a humanitarian assistance board, a health board, an education board, and reconstruction planning.

Within LTTE-controlled territory, the organization operated the Bank of Tamil Eelam, the Voice of Tigers radio station, and the National Television of Tamil Eelam. In areas where control was contested between the Tamil Eelam administration and the Sri Lankan government, governance systems overlapped. This structure has been defined as a "de facto dual-state [dual power] structure", while LTTE-institutions continued to operate in Tamil Eelam.

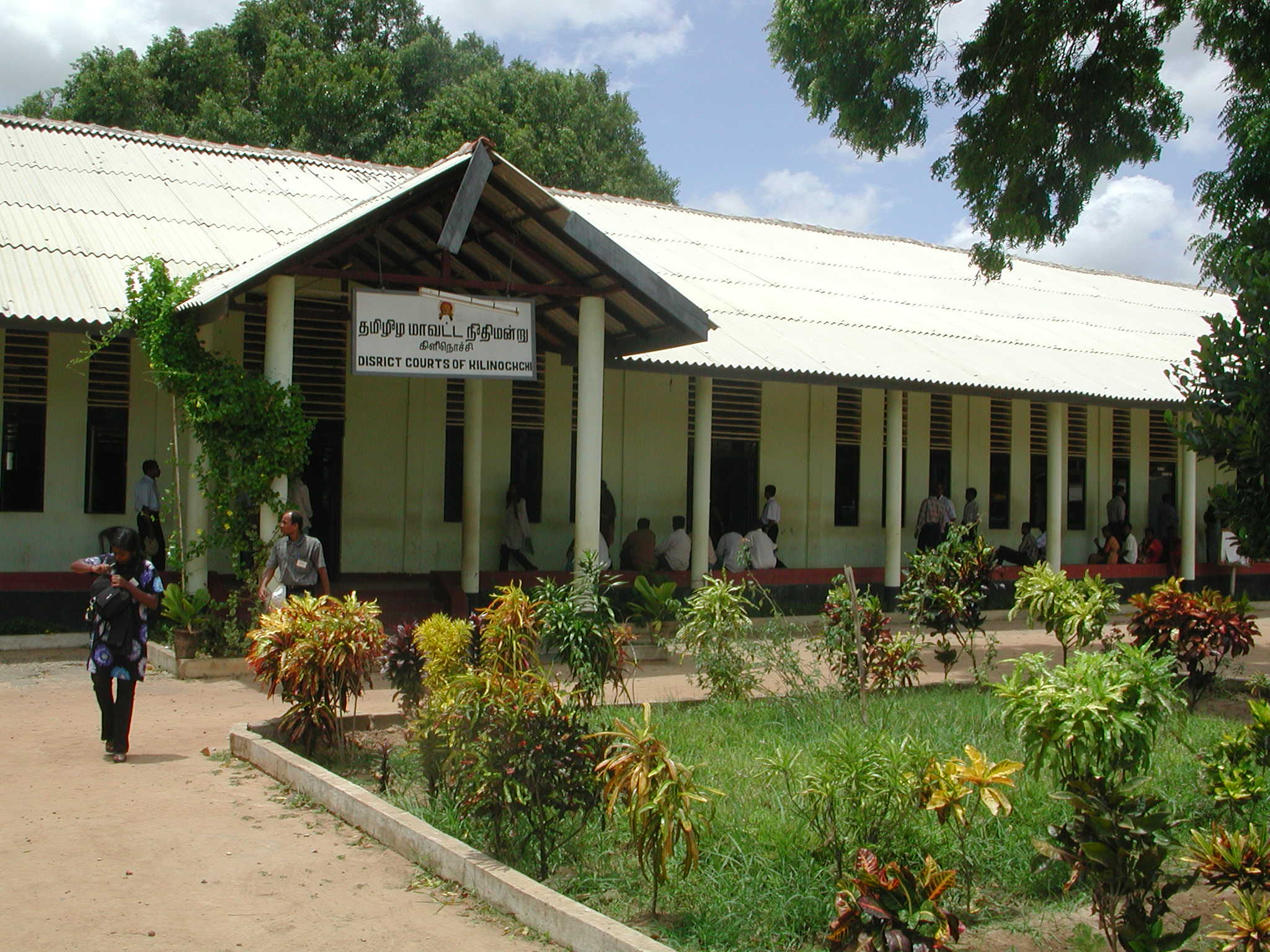
A Tamil Eelam-operated court in Kilinochchi

=== Judiciary ===
The Tamil Eelam court system consisted of a hierarchical structure comprising six district courts, two High Courts, an Appeals Court, and a Special Bench that functioned similarly to a Supreme Court. According to the United States Department of State, the court system was composed of young judges with little to no legal training, operated without codified or clearly defined legal authority, and functioned largely as an extension of the LTTE rather than as an independent judiciary. In Tamil Eelam, women reported lower levels of domestic violence because "the Tigers had a de facto justice system to deal with domestic violence."

=== Economy ===
According to United States officials, the LTTE generated an estimated $100–200 million in annual revenue, while other estimates placed its yearly income at as much as $300 million–1.5 billion. Furthermore, Tamil Eelam generated revenue through road taxes and fees for passes required to enter or leave its territory. When asked about the tax system in Tamil Eelam, Velupillai Prabhakaran compared it to the Sri Lankan government's taxation of areas under its control, stating that Tamil Eelam levied taxes to finance the administration of areas it controlled.

Tamil Eelam created the Tamil Eelam Economic Development Organisation (TEEDOR) to research and development initiatives involving agriculture, industry, and infrastructure. Tamil Eelam supported various small-scale industries, including salt production and prawn farming, while also undertaking longer-term projects such as reforestation and road construction. TEEDOR also worked with the Economic Consultancy House of the University of Jaffna on town planning and other development projects. In 1994, the Bank of Tamil Eelam was established to expand these efforts by providing revolving loans intended to support small businesses and economically disadvantaged rural communities.

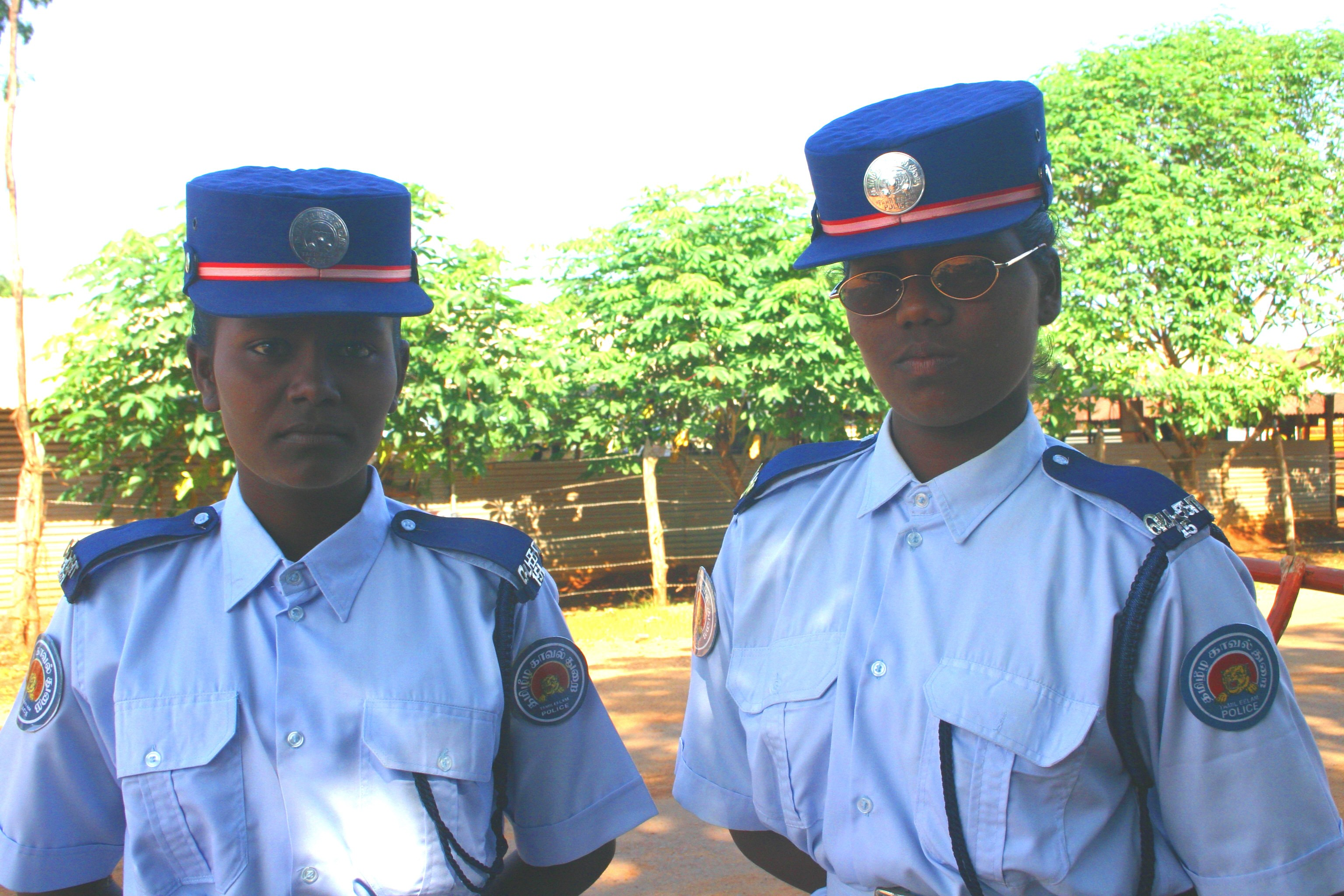
Police women of the Tamil Eelam

=== Governmental institutions ===
The Central Governing Committee led the government and its institutions:

- Liberation Tigers of Tamil Eelam Peace Secretariat
- Planning and Development Secretariat
- Secretariat for Immediate Humanitarian and Rehabilitation Needs
- Tamils Rehabilitation Organization
- North-East Secretariat on Human Rights
- Tamil Eelam Police
- Liberation Tigers of Tamil Eelam Special Task Force for Tsunami-Affected Areas
- The Economic Consultancy House
- Tiger Organization Security Intelligence Service

== Human rights ==
The United States Department of State described LTTE's governance system as an "authoritarian military rule" that violated civil liberties and discriminated against minorities.

== See also ==
- Transnational Government of Tamil Eelam
- Sri Lankan Tamil nationalism
- Democratic Autonomous Administration of North and East Syria
- Liberated Zones (Guinea-Bissau)
