= Jagannathan =

Jagannathan is an Indian and Sri Lankan name. It derives from Sanskrit and consists of two parts: jagannath (lord of the universe; from jagata = lord and natha = world, universe), and a masculine suffix -an. The name may refer to the following notable people:

Given name

- Jagannathan (actor) (1938–2012), Indian actor from Kerala
- Jagannathan Kaushik (born 1985), Indian first-class cricketer

Surname

- A. Jagannathan (1935–2012), Indian film director
- K. Jagannathan, Indian genetic scientist known for the Bhaskar–Jagannathan syndrome
- Ki. Va. Jagannathan (1906–1988), Indian journalist, poet, writer, and folklorist from Tamil Nadu
- Krishnammal Jagannathan (born 1926), Indian social service activist from Tamil Nadu
- M. Jagannathan, Indian politician from Tamil Nadu
- Poorna Jagannathan (born 1972), Tunisian-born U.S. actress and producer
- R. Jagannathan, Indian journalist and editor
- Ravi Jagannathan, Indian-born U.S. economist and academic
  - Hansen–Jagannathan bound, a theorem in financial economics
- Sahithya Jagannathan (born 1989), Indian fashion model and actor
- Sarukkai Jagannathan (1914–1996), Indian banker and International Monetary Fund official

== See also ==
- Jagannath
- Jagannath Sami
- Jai Jagannatha
- Jeganathan (1956–1983)
- Jogannath
