= Interim Self Governing Authority =

Political proposal of Liberation Tigers of Tamil Eelam

The Interim Self Governing Authority (ISGA) was a proposal issued in October 2003 by the rebel Liberation Tigers of Tamil Eelam (LTTE) of Sri Lanka for power sharing in the northern and eastern provinces of Sri Lanka. The proposals were made in-lieu of the LTTE renouncing its claim for an independent country called Tamil Eelam for the minority Sri Lankan Tamil people.

== Background ==
The Parliamentary elections of 5 December 2001 had resulted in a victory for the United National Front (UNF) alliance led by the United National Party (UNP). The UNP had campaigned on a pro-peace platform and pledged to find a negotiated settlement to the Sri Lankan civil war. Within days of the UNF victory the LTTE announced a 30-day ceasefire. This ceasefire was formalised on 22 February 2002 when the UNF Government of Sri Lanka (GOSL) and the LTTE signed a Norwegian mediated permanent ceasefire agreement. In September 2002 peace talks began in Phuket, Thailand but in April 2003 the LTTE suspended talks citing a number of reasons.

== The ISGA ==
On 31 October 2003, with the ceasefire still holding, the LTTE issued their proposals for an ISGA. The ISGA would have broad powers such the right to impose the rule of law, collect taxes, run the administration and oversee the rehabilitation process in the north and east, and it would be controlled by the LTTE until elections were held. Crucially however, the LTTE had dropped their demand for an independent Tamil Eelam in favour of regional autonomy. The key points of the LTTE's proposals are:

- An ISGA will be established for the eight districts in the Northern and Eastern provinces until a final negotiated settlement is reached and implemented.
- Initially the members of the ISGA will be appointed by the parties to this agreement with the LTTE appointing an absolute majority, but
- Democratic elections will be held if no final negotiated settlement is reached and implemented within five years.
- The ISGA shall have plenary power for the governance of the north-east including powers in relation to resettlement, rehabilitation, reconstruction, development, raising revenue including imposition of taxes, revenue, levies and duties, law and order, and over land.
- The GOSL agrees that any and all of its expenditures in or for the north-east shall be subject to the control of the ISGA.
- The ISGA shall have powers to borrow internally and externally, provide guarantees and indemnities, receive aid directly, and engage in or regulate internal and external trade.
- The ISGA shall have direction and control over any and all administrative structures and personnel in the north-east.
- The ISGA shall have the power to alienate and determine the appropriate use of all land in the north-east that is not privately owned.
- Land occupied by the armed forces of the GOSL must be immediately vacated and restored to the possession of the previous owners. The GOSL must also compensate the owners for the past dispossession of their land.
- The ISGA shall be responsible for the resettlement and rehabilitation of displaced civilians and refugees in such lands.
- The ISGA shall have control over the marine and offshore resources of the adjacent seas and the power to regulate access thereto.
- The ISGA will have control over the natural resources in the north-east region. The GOSL shall ensure that all monies due under existing agreements are paid to the ISGA.
- All future agreements concerning matters under the jurisdiction of the ISGA shall be made with the ISGA.

== Key features ==
=== Elections ===
An independent Election Commission, appointed by the ISGA, shall conduct free and fair elections in accordance with international democratic principles and standards under international observation.

=== Human rights ===
The people of the north-east shall be accorded all rights as are provided under international human rights law. Every law, regulation, rule, order or decision of the ISGA shall conform to internationally accepted standards of human rights protection. There shall be an independent human rights commission, appointed by the ISGA, which shall ensure the compliance with all such human rights obligations. The commission will seek the assistance of international human rights bodies to facilitate the rapid establishment of an effective regime for protecting human rights. The commission shall be entitled to receive petitions from any individual person, award compensation to any such affected person, and ensure that such person's rights are restored.

=== Secularism ===
No religion shall be given the foremost place in the north-east.

=== Prohibition of discrimination ===
The ISGA shall ensure that there is no discrimination on grounds of religion, race, caste, national or regional origin, age or gender in the north-east. No law, regulation, rule, order or decision that confers a privilege or imposes a disability on any community, which is not conferred or imposed on any other community, shall be made concerning culture or religion.

No law, regulation, rule, order or decision that confers a privilege or imposes a disability on any community, which is not conferred or imposed on any other community, shall be made concerning culture or religion.

=== Administration ===
As part of the exercise of its executive powers the ISGA shall have direction and control over any and all administrative structures and personnel in the north-east pertaining to the powers set out in Clause 9 of this agreement. The ISGA may, at its discretion, create expert advisory committees in necessary areas. These areas will include but are not limited to economic affairs, financial affairs, judicial affairs, resettlement and rehabilitation affairs, development of infrastructure, and essential services.

== Reaction ==
International reaction to the LTTE's proposals was generally positive. US Deputy Secretary of State Richard Armitage gave a cautious welcome, saying that the proposal is "the first time I have seen such a comprehensive delineation of the aspirations of the LTTE...it is significant". But he also added that the proposal "does go outside the bounds of Oslo and that envisioned in Oslo and Tokyo, where we talked about a federation, a democratic society, respect for human rights and territorial integrity of the entire island....we need to kind of come back towards the boundaries envisioned by Oslo." The European Union's Head of Mission in Colombo welcomed the proposals as an "important step forward in the peace process".

Sri Lankan reaction was mixed. The GOSL reacted by stating that the proposal "differs in fundamental respects from the proposals submitted by the GOSL. The GOSL is convinced that the way forward lies through direct discussion of the issues arising from both sets of proposals". The Tamil National Alliance (TNA), the main political party representing Sri Lankan Tamils, welcomed the proposals positively. R. Sampanthan, leader of the TNA, said "The ISGA proposal..bears historical importance in the political history of Tamils in the island. The ISGA provides a base to find a permanent political solution to the Tamil national question". The Sri Lanka Freedom Party (SLFP), the main opposition party in the Sri Lankan Parliament, expressed grave concern over ISGA proposals saying ""it will never be a party to robbing the people of Sri Lanka of their sovereignty. Reaction from Sri Lankan nationalists, led by the People's Liberation Front (JVP), was very hostile - they considered the LTTE's proposals de facto Tamil Eelam. The JVP said the proposals deserve no discussions with any one and should be thrown into waste paper basket. The JVP pointed out that the proposal contained all powers required for a separate state in the island. The Sihala Urumaya (SU) appealed to the UNF government to terminate the peace talks with LTTE on the basis of the contents of the proposals, which the SU said will lead to the formation of a separate state.

On 4 November 2003, while Prime Minister Wickremasinghe was out of the country, President Kumaratunga, who is from the SLFP, suspended Parliament, took control of the Ministries of Defence, Interior and Information and ordered troops to key installations. The next day the President declared a state of emergency. On 7 February 2004 the President dissolved Parliament and called for elections on 2 April. The elections were won by a SLFP-JVP alliance.

== See also ==
- Sri Lankan civil war
- Sri Lankan Tamil nationalism
- Thimpu principles
