= Sepala Ekanayake =

Sri Lankan criminal

- Born: Karatota, Matara, Sri Lanka
- Status: Released in 1987
- Criminal charges: Hijacking an Alitalia airplane
- Penalty: Sentenced to five years in jail

Sepala Ekanayake (or Ekanayaka; born in Karatota, Matara, Sri Lanka) gained international notoriety after hijacking an Alitalia Boeing 747 with 340 passengers on June 30, 1982.

== Life and career ==
=== Early life ===
Ekanayake attended a village school and Yodakandiya Vidyalaya in Hambantota. As a child he ran away from his father's home and stayed with the headmaster of Ananda Primary for six months.

In 1972 Ekanayake moved to West Germany. In Germany he formed a romantic relationship with an Italian woman. They were married in 1977. In 1980 they relocated to Modena, Italy and had a son.

Ekanayake's Italian visa expired some time after his son's birth and he was denied a new one by Italian authorities. They suggested instead that he return to Sri Lanka and apply for visa with the Italian Embassy in Colombo. Ekanayake then learned that he had to wait six years before he could obtain a visa. Angry at his situation he concocted a plan to hijack an Italian plane and put forth his demands straight to the Italian government.

On June 30, 1982, Ekanayake traveled to the New Delhi airport with some of his friends and awaited the arrival of an Alitalia Boeing 747 from Rome on its way to Tokyo. Upon its arrival, Ekanayake obtained a rear seat on the plane.

=== Hijacking ===
1982 Alitalia hijacking
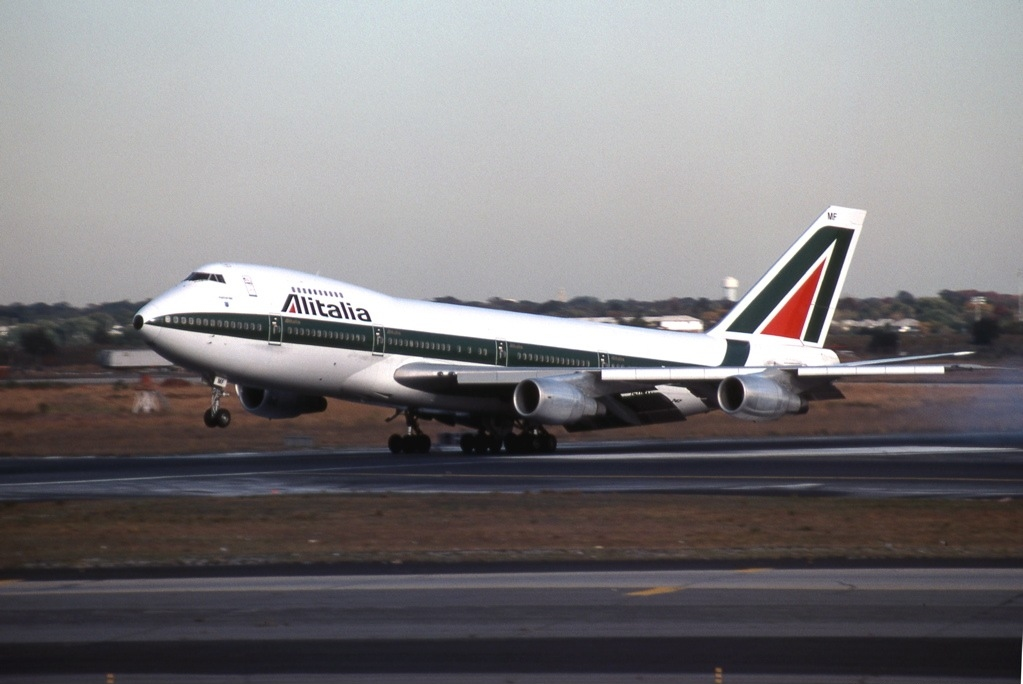
- I-DEMF, involved in the incident

Occurrence
- Date: June 30, 1982
- Summary: Hijacking
- Site: Bangkok-Don Muang International Airport, Thailand

Aircraft
- Aircraft type: Boeing 747-243B
- Operator: Alitalia
- Registration: I-DEMF
- Flight origin: Rome Fiumicino Airport, Rome, Italy
- 1st stopover: Indira Gandhi International Airport, New Delhi, India
- Destination: Haneda Airport, Tokyo, Japan
- Passengers: 340
- Fatalities: 0
- Injuries: 0

Ekanayake waited until the plane reached a level of 35,000 feet and then issued his demands to the pilot in a letter. He wanted to have his wife and son brought to the Bangkok-Don Muang International Airport and 300,000 US dollars. He also instructed that the plane was to land at the Bangkok airport, leave the doors closed, issue the demands to the Italian authorities, and communicate only through radio. If his orders were not followed Ekanayake would blow up the plane with the "most sophisticated bombs manufactured in Italy."

The chief pilot George Amarosa immediately dropped to 25,000 feet and headed to Bangkok. In a few hours his wife and son and the ransom were on the way to the city. In 30 hours the transaction was completed and Ekanayake released the passengers of the plane. He now had to figure out where he would go with the money and his family.

=== Aftermath ===
The Sri Lankan ambassador in Bangkok, Manel Abeysekera, assured Ekanayake that he could return to Sri Lanka without any fear. Later, she denied that she had made this statement.

Ekanayake reluctantly did and the Italian government demanded that he be handed over to them. Public opinion in Sri Lanka opposed this move; some in Sri Lanka even deemed Ekanayake a hero. Eventually he was arrested in Galle and sent to Welikada Prison. Sri Lanka passed new legislation in order to try him in their courts and sentenced him to five years in prison. His wife and son returned safely to Italy. According to Rajan Hoole's book Sri Lanka: The Arrogance of Power: Myths, Decadence and Murder, Ekanayake was allegedly involved in the 1983 Welikada prison massacre of Tamil inmates. Ekanayake, who was released in 1987, denied involvement.
