= Attiar Hindu College =

School in Northern Province, Sri Lanka

Location
- Jaffna-Point Pedro Road, Neervely North; Neervely, Jaffna District, Northern Province; Sri Lanka; 9°43′12.90″N 80°05′03.70″E

Information
- School type: Public provincial (APS) 1C
- Founded: 1929
- Founder: Muthaliar Attiar A. Arunasalum
- School district: Jaffna Education Zone
- School number: 1009002
- Principal: K. Ravichandran
- Teaching staff: 40
- Grades: 1-13
- Gender: Mixed
- Age range: 5-18
- Classrooms: 17
- Sports: football; volleyball; cricket; softball; netball
- Website: ahc.neervely.info

Attiar Hindu College (AHC) is a provincial school in Neervely, Sri Lanka. The college was found by Muthaliar Attiar A. Arunachalam (1885 - 22 September 1961) in 1929.

== See also ==
- List of schools in Northern Province, Sri Lanka
