= Thimpu principles =

The Thimpu principles or Thimpu Declaration were a set of four demands put forward by the Sri Lankan Tamil delegation at the first peace talks undertaken regarding the Sri Lankan civil war. The peace talks which were organised by the Indian government took place in Thimphu, Bhutan with Phase I occurring from 8 to 13 July 1985 and Phase II from 12 to 17 August 1985. The peace talks aimed at bringing an end to the Sri Lankan civil war between Sri Lankan Tamil militant groups and the government of Sri Lanka. The declaration made by the Tamil delegation at Thimphu, in response to a government proposal, has come to be known as the Thimpu Declaration or Thimpu principles.

== Introduction ==
The Sri Lankan government delegation consisted of Hector Jayawardene (President Junius Jayewardene's brother), three lawyers, and an attorney. The Tamil delegation consisted of representatives from the Eelam People's Revolutionary Liberation Front (EPRLF), Eelam Revolutionary Organisation of Students (EROS), Liberation Tigers of Tamil Eelam (LTTE), People's Liberation Organisation of Tamil Eelam (PLOTE), Tamil Eelam Liberation Organisation (TELO) and Tamil United Liberation Front (TULF).

The Sri Lankan government delegation proposed draft legislation for devolution of power but this was rejected by the Tamil delegation, arguing they failed to recognize the Tamil people's right to a homeland or self-determination and instead sought to maintain Sri Lanka's sovereignty and territorial integrity through constitutional amendments requiring a two-thirds parliamentary majority. On 13 July, the Tamil delegation responded, issuing the Thimpu Declaration, which outlined four key demands (the cardinal principles). The four cardinal principles became known as the Thimpu principles.

== Thimpu Declaration ==
The declaration stated:

It is our considered view that any meaningful solution to the Tamil national question must be based on the following four cardinal principles:

- recognition of the Tamils of Ceylon as a nation
- recognition of the existence of an identified homeland for the Tamils of Ceylon
- recognition of the right of self determination of the Tamil nation
- recognition of the right to citizenship and the fundamental rights of all Tamils of Ceylon

Different countries have fashioned different systems of governments to ensure these principles. We have demanded and struggled for an independent Tamil state as the answer to this problem arising out of the denial of these basic rights of our people. The proposals put forward by the Sri Lankan government delegation as their solution to this problem is totally unacceptable. Therefore we have rejected them as stated by us in our statement of the 12th of July 1985. However, in view of our earnest desire for peace, we are prepared to give consideration to any set of proposals, in keeping with the above mentioned principles, that the Sri Lankan Government may place before us.

The Sri Lankan government rejected all but the last principle as they violated Sri Lanka's sovereignty.

The peace talks collapsed on 18 August due to the intransigence of both delegations.

== See also ==
- Sri Lankan civil war
- Sri Lankan Tamil nationalism
