= Eelam War =

"Eelam War" is the name given to several phases of the armed conflict between the government of Sri Lanka and the LTTE:

- Sri Lankan civil war, between 1983 and 2009
- Eelam War I, between 1983 and 1987
- Eelam War II, between 1990 and 1995
- Eelam War III, between 1995 and 2002
- Eelam War IV, between 2006 and 2009
