= Welikada =

Welikada වැලිකඩ வெலிக்கடை
- Suburb
- Location within Sri Lanka
- Coordinates: 6°55′0″N 79°53′0″E
- Country: Sri Lanka
- Province: Western Province
- District: Colombo District
- Time zone: UTC+5:30 (Sri Lanka Standard Time Zone)

Welikada is a suburb in Colombo, Sri Lanka. It is the location of the Welikada Maximum Security Prison.
