= Casualties of the Sri Lankan civil war =

The Sri Lankan Civil War was waged for over a quarter of a century, with an estimated 70,000 killed by 2007. Immediately following the end of war, on 20 May 2009, the UN estimated a total of 80,000–100,000 deaths. However, in 2011, referring to the final phase of the war in 2009, the Report of the Secretary-General's Panel of Experts on Accountability in Sri Lanka stated, "A number of credible sources have estimated that there could have been as many as 40,000 civilian deaths." The large majority of these civilian deaths in the final phase of the war were said to have been caused by indiscriminate shelling of a formerly designated 'No Fire Zone' by the Sri Lankan Armed Forces.

The "Tamil Centre for Human Rights" recorded that from 1983 to 2004, 54,053 Tamil civilians were killed during the war and another 25,266 were made to disappeared but never found again. According to ITJP (International Truth and Justice Project, which was established 2013 to promote justice and accountability in Sri Lanka and headed by Yasmin Sooka), 169,796 civilians disappeared between January and May 2009 in the Mullaitivu and Kilinochchi districts. Another organization called NESOHR published that from the beginning of the war to the 2002 ceasefire, 4000 to 5000 Tamil civilians were killed in large scale massacres, with a total civilian death of around 40,000. Multiple media sources also quoted an estimated 70,000 killed by 2007.

Civilian casualties that occurred on 2009 is of major controversy, as there were no organizations to record the events during the final months of the war. The Sri Lankan government claimed that 9,000 people were killed in the final months of the war, but it did not differentiate between LTTE cadres and civilians. The UN, based on credible witness evidence from aid agencies and civilians evacuated from the Safe Zone by sea, estimated that 6,500 civilians were killed and another 14,000 injured between mid-January 2009, when the Safe Zone was first declared, and mid-April 2009. There are no official casualty figures after this period but estimates of the death toll for the final four months of the civil war (mid-January to mid-May) range from 15,000 to 75,000, most of the deaths being a result of government shelling. A US State Department report has suggested that the actual casualty figures were probably much higher than the UN's estimates and that significant numbers of casualties weren't recorded. A former UN official has claimed that up to 40,000 civilians may have been killed in the final stages of the civil war. Several human rights groups have even claimed that the death toll in the last months of the war could be 70,000.

The Sri Lankan government has denied all claims of causing mass casualties against Tamils, arguing that it was "taking care not to harm civilians". Instead, it has blamed the LTTE for the high casualty numbers, stating that they used the civilians as human shields. According to the UN Panel Report, LTTE used civilians as hostages and the LTTE's refusal to allow civilians leave the area added significantly to the total death toll in the conflict. The UN Panel Report further states that LTTE instituted a policy of shooting civilians who attempted to escape the conflict zone, significantly adding to the death toll in the final stages of the war. Both the Sri Lankan government and the LTTE have been accused by the U.N for war crimes during the last phase of the war.

While the majority of civilian deaths were that of the Tamil minority, the war also took many Sinhalese and Muslim lives. The LTTE were estimated to be responsible for 3,700 to 4,100 civilian deaths in over 200 separate attacks. However, this figure only accounts for those killed in open attacks. Rajan Hoole, a human rights activist claims that various dissident sources allege that the number of Tamil dissenters and prisoners from rival armed groups clandestinely killed by the LTTE in detention or otherwise ranges from 8,000 - 20,000, although he later stated that western agencies dismissed his figures as exaggeration. In response to the killings of Sinhalese and Muslims, LTTE leader Prabhakaran denied allegations of killing civilians, claiming to condemn such acts of violence; and claimed that LTTE had instead attacked armed home guards who were "death-squads let loose on Tamil civilians" and Sinhalese settlers who were "brought to the Tamil areas to forcibly occupy the land." Amnesty International has noted that in several massacres of Sinhalese and Muslims, the victims had not been home guards or armed settlers. Human Rights Watch has noted that LTTE had engaged in "ethnic cleansing" of Sinhalese and Muslim villagers.

Around 27,000 LTTE cadres, 28,708 Sri Lankan military personnel, 1000+ Sri Lankan police, 1,165 Indian soldiers were said to have died in the conflict. Another 5,000 Sri Lankan military members went missing in action. In 2008, the LTTE revealed that "22,390 fighters who have lost their lives in the armed struggle since 27 November 1982". Minister of Defence Gotabhaya Rajapaksa said on an interview with state television that 23,790 Sri Lankan military personnel were killed since 1981 (it was not specified if police or other non armed forces personnel were included in this particular figure). The Uppsala Conflict Data Program, a university-based data collection program considered to be "one of the most accurate and well-used data-sources on global armed conflicts" provides free data to the public and has divided Sri Lanka's conflicts into groups based on the actors involved. It collectively reported that between 1990 and 2009 between 59,193 and 75,601 people were killed in Sri Lanka during various three types of organized armed conflict: "State-based" conflicts, those that involved the Government of Sri Lanka against rebel groups(LTTE and the JVP), "Non-state" conflicts, those conflicts that did not involve the government of Sri Lanka (e.g. LTTE vs. LTTE-Karuna Faction, and LTTE vs. PLOTE), as well as "One-sided" violence, that involved deliberate attacks against civilians perpetrated by the Government of Sri Lanka.

== Summary ==
Minister of Defence Gotabhaya Rajapaksa said on an interview with state television that 23,790 Sri Lankan military personnel were killed since 1981 (it was not specified if police or other non armed forces personnel were included in this particular figure).

From the August 2006 recapture of the Mavil Aru reservoir until the formal declaration of the cessation of hostilities (on 18 May), 6261 Sri Lankan soldiers were killed and 29,551 were wounded.

The Sri Lankan military estimates that up to 22,000 Tamil Tiger rebels were killed in the last three years of the conflict.

The final five months of the civil war saw the heaviest civilian casualties. The UN, based on credible witness evidence from aid agencies and civilians evacuated from the Safe Zone by sea, estimated that 6,500 civilians were killed and another 14,000 injured between mid-January 2009, when the Safe Zone was first declared, and mid-April 2009. There are no official casualty figures after this period but estimates of the death toll for the final four months of the civil war (mid-January to mid-May) range from 15,000 to 20,000. A US State Department report has suggested that the actual casualty figures were probably much higher than the UN's estimates and that significant numbers of casualties weren't recorded. A former UN official has claimed that up to 40,000 civilians may have been killed in the final stages of the civil war.

The Tamil Center for Human Rights claims 12,104 Tamil women had been raped between 1983 and 2004 throughout the war.

== Casualties ==
War or Phase	Date	Deaths									Total dead	Wounded									Total wounded	Sources/ notes
War or Phase	Date	combat			other			total			Total dead	combat			other			total			Total wounded	Sources/ notes
War or Phase	Date	C	SF	TT	C	SF	TT	C	SF	TT	Total dead	C	SF	TT	C	SF	TT	C	SF	TT	Total wounded	Sources/ notes
Eelam War I	1983	1	2	3	4	5	6	7	8	9		10	11	12	13	14	15	16	17	18		
	1984																					
	1985																					
	1986																					
Eelam War I/Indian intervention	1987																					
	1988																					
	1989																					
Indian intervention /Eelam War II	1990																					
	1991																					
	1992																					
	1993																					
	1994																					
Eelam War II/Eelam War III	1995																					
	1996																					
	1997																					
	1998																					
	1999																					
	2000	162	784	2,845																		
	2001	89	412	1,321																		
2002 Ceasefire	2002	14	1	0																		
	2003	31	2	26																		
	2004	33	7	69																		
	2005	153	90	87																		
2002 Ceasefire/Eelam War IV	2006	981	826	2,319																		
	2007	525	499	3,345																		
	2008	404	1,314	9,426																		
	2009	11,108	1,312	2,941																		
Total	≈26 years	13,500	5,247	22,379					23,790	27,639												

The above table is incomplete. Revisions and sourced additions are welcome.

== Eelam War I ==
Year	Civilians	Security Force	LTTE	Total
1983	400 - 6,571	13	53 - 100	~3,113
1984	872 -1,075			
1985	777 - 1,023			
1986	889 - 1,067			
1987	3,714 - 5,017			
Total	6,652 - 14,753			
Notes: Higher estimates including disappeared peoples as presumed dead

The above table is incomplete. Revisions and sourced additions are welcome.

== Indian intervention ==
Year	Civilians	Security Force	IPKF	LTTE	Total
1987	3,714 - 5,017				
1988	2,929 - 4,182				
1989	1,475 - 3,003				
1990	5,798 - 15,179				
Total	13,916 - 27,381	26	1,000+	1,300	
Notes: Higher estimates including disappeared peoples as presumed dead

The above table is incomplete. Revisions and sourced additions are welcome.

== Eelam War II ==
Year	Civilians	Security Force	LTTE	Total
1990	5,798 - 15,179			
1991	4,360 - 6,207			
1992	3,769 - 5,549			
1993	2,983 - 3,659			
1994	2,470 - 3,006			
1995	3,481 - 4,415			
Total	22,861 - 38,015			
Notes: Higher estimates including disappeared peoples as presumed dead

The above table is incomplete. Revisions and sourced additions are welcome.

== Eelam War III ==
Year	Civilians	Security Force	LTTE	Total
1995	3,481 - 4,415			3,481 - 4,415
1996	4,074 - 5,752			4,074 - 5,752
1997	4,056 - 5,519			4,056 - 5,519
1998	2,161 - 3,499			2,161 - 3,499
1999	1,661 - 1,838			1,661 - 1,838
2000*	162 - 1,707	784	2,845	3,791 - 5,336
2001	89 - 93	412	1,321	1,822 - 1,826
Total	15,684 - 22,823	1,196	4,166	21,046 - 28,185
Notes: *Data from 1 March 2000 higher estimates including disappeared peoples as presumed dead

The above table is incomplete. Revisions and sourced additions are welcome.

== Cease Fire Period ==
Year	Civilians	Security Force	LTTE	Total
2002	14 - 32	1	0	15 - 33
2003	31 - 50	2	26	59 - 78
2004	33 - 91	7	69	109 - 167
2005	153	90	87	330
Total	231 - 326	100	182	513 - 608
Notes: Includes only Casualties between 2002 and 2005 most of which is the Cease Fire. Higher estimates including disappeared peoples as presumed dead

The above table is incomplete. Revisions and sourced additions are welcome.

== Eelam War IV ==
Year	Civilians	Security Force	LTTE	Total
2006	981	826	2,319	4,126
2007	525	499	3,345	4,369
2008	404	1,314	9,426	11,144
2009*	9,257 - 140,000	1,312	2,515	13,084 - 143,827
Total	11,167 - 141,910	3,954	17,425	32,723 - 163,466
Notes:*Data till April 20, 2009

The above table is incomplete. Revisions and sourced additions are welcome.

== Overall ==
Year	Civilians	Security Force	LTTE	Total
Eelam War I
1983	400 - 6,571	13	53 - 100	~3,113
1984	872 -1,075			
1985	777 - 1,023			
1986	889 - 1,067			
1987	3,714 - 5,017			
Indian intervention
1988	2,929 - 4,182			
1989	1,475 - 3,003			
Eelam War II
1990	5,798 - 15,179			
1991	4,360 - 6,207			
1992	3,769 - 5,549			
1993	2,983 - 3,659			
1994	2,470 - 3,006			
Eelam War III
1995	3,481 - 4,415			
1996	4,074 - 5,752			
1997	4,056 - 5,519			
1998	2,161 - 3,499			
1999	1,661 - 1,838			
2000	162 - 1,707	784	2,845	3,791
2001	89 - 93	412	1,321	1,822
Cease Fire Period
2002	14 - 32	1	0	15
2003	31 -50	2	26	59
2004	33 - 91	7	69	109
2005	153	90	87	330
Eelam War IV
2006	981	826	2,319	4,126
2007	525	499	3,345	4,369
2008	404	1,314	9,426	11,144
2009*	9,257 - 40,000 ________________________ (? 71,173 ? - accounting for 75,000 figure)	1,312 ________________________ (? 32,485 - 63,228 ? - accounting for 75,000 figure)	2,515 ________________________ (Tamil Tigers didn't have (They had 30,000 fighters) enough fighters to account for the 75,000 figure.)	13,084 - 75,000
Total	55,608 - 125,614 ________________________ (156,787 accounting for 75,000 figure in 2009)	5,247 - 67,163 (accounting for 75,000 figure in 2009)	21,953	38,849 - 152,814 ________________________ (183,987 - 214,730 accounting for 75,000 figure in 2009)
Notes:*Data till May 11, 2009, **Data from March 1, 2000, higher estimates including disappeared peoples as presumed dead

The above table is incomplete. Revisions and sourced additions are welcome.
