= Liberation Tigers of Tamil Eelam =

Tamil militant organisation in Sri Lanka (1976–2009)

- தமிழீழ விடுதலைப் புலிகள் දෙමළ ඊලාම් විමුක්ති කොටි සංවිධානය
- LTTE emblem
- Other name: Tamil Tigers; LTTE
- Leaders: Velupillai Prabhakaran † (1976–2009); Kumaran Pathmanathan (2009)
- Founded: 5 May 1976
- Dates active: 5 May 1976 – 18 May 2009 (33 years, 13 days)
- Country: Sri Lanka
- Allegiance: Tamil Eelam (1984–2009)
- Ideology: Ideology of Subhas Chandra Bose; Tamil nationalism Left-wing nationalism Revolutionary socialism Egalitarianism; Secularism; Separatism; Open market economy
- Anthem: Eruthu Paar Kodi (Look, the Flag is Rising)
- Status: Inactive; Militarily defeated in May 2009
- Size: 18,000, as of 2004, excluding divisions
- Annual revenue: US$300+ million prior to the military defeat
- Wars: Sri Lankan civil war
- Flag
- Website: Official website (now defunct)

The Liberation Tigers of Tamil Eelam (LTTE; Tamil: தமிழீழ விடுதலைப் புலிகள், romanized: Tamiḻīḻa viṭutalaip pulikaḷ, Sinhala: දෙමළ ඊලාම් විමුක්ති කොටි සංවිධානය, romanized: Demaḷa īlām vimukti koṭi saṁvidhānaya; also known as the Tamil Tigers) was a Tamil militant organization, that was based in northern and eastern Sri Lanka. LTTE sought to create an independent Tamil state called Tamil Eelam in the northeast of the island in response to violent persecution and discriminatory policies against Sri Lankan Tamils by the Sinhalese-dominated Sri Lankan government.

The leader of the LTTE, Velupillai Prabhakaran, cited the 1958 anti-Tamil pogrom as one of the factors that led him to militancy. In 1975, he assassinated the Mayor of Jaffna, Alfred Duraiappah, in revenge for the 1974 Tamil conference incident. The LTTE was subsequently founded in 1976 as a reaction to the Sri Lankan Constitution of 1972 which prescribed Buddhism as the primary religion of the country, and Sinhala as its national language. The LTTE was involved in attacks on government targets, policemen and local politicians and moved on to armed clashes against the armed forces. Oppression against Sri Lankan Tamils continued by Sinhalese mobs, notably during the 1977 anti-Tamil pogrom and the 1981 burning of the Jaffna Public Library. Following the watershed Black July anti-Tamil pogrom in 1983 orchestrated by members of the government, there was a dramatic growth of Tamil militant groups and a full-scale insurgency began, marking the start of the Sri Lankan civil war. By 1986, the LTTE had emerged as the dominant Tamil militant group in Sri Lanka. It would go on to be widely regarded as among the most effective and disciplined insurgent groups in the world.

Initially starting out as a guerrilla force, the LTTE increasingly came to resemble conventional armed forces with a well-developed military wing that included a navy, an airborne unit, an intelligence wing, and a specialised suicide attack unit. The LTTE perfected suicide bombing as a tactic. It engaged in a hybrid warfare encompassing both military and civilian targets. The LTTE was also notable for using women and children in combat, and carrying out a number of high-profile assassinations, including former Indian prime minister Rajiv Gandhi in 1991. The LTTE was designated as a terrorist organisation by 33 countries, including the European Union, Canada, the United States and India.

Over the course of the conflict, the LTTE frequently exchanged control of territory in the north-east with the Sri Lankan military, with the two sides engaging in intense military confrontations. It was involved in four unsuccessful rounds of peace talks with the Sri Lankan government and at its peak in 2000, the LTTE was in control of 76% of the landmass in the Northern and Eastern provinces of Sri Lanka. Prabhakaran headed the organisation from its inception until his death in 2009. Between 1983 and 2009, at least 100,000 were killed in the civil war, of which many were Sri Lankan Tamils. Many Sri Lankan Tamils also left Sri Lanka for various destinations, mainly Western countries and India, forming the pivotal Tamil diaspora estimated at one million.

== History ==
=== Background ===
Emergence of Tamil militancy has its roots in the political developments and ethnic tensions in post-independent Sri Lanka. Sinhalese-led governments attempted to reduce the increased presence of the Tamil minority in government jobs, which led to ethnic discrimination, seeded hatred and divisive policies including the "Sinhala Only Act" and anti-Tamil riots, which gave rise to separatist ideologies among many Tamil leaders. By the late 1970s, initial non-violent political struggle for an independent Tamil state was used as justification for a secessionist insurgency led by the LTTE.

In the early 1970s, the United Front government of Sirimavo Bandaranaike introduced the policy of standardisation to curtail the number of Tamil students selected for certain faculties in the universities. In 1972, the government added a district quota as a parameter within each language. A student named Satiyaseelan formed Tamil Manavar Peravai (Tamil Students League) to counter this. This group comprised Tamil youth who advocated the rights of students to have fair enrolment. Inspired by the failed 1971 insurrection of Janatha Vimukthi Peramuna, it was the first Tamil militant group of its kind. It consisted of around 40 Tamil youth, including Ponnuthurai Sivakumaran (later, the leader of the Sivakumaran group), K. Pathmanaba (one of the founder members of EROS) and Velupillai Prabhakaran, an 18-year-old youth from Valvettithurai (VVT).

In 1972, Prabhakaran teamed up with Chetti Thanabalasingam in Jaffna to form the Tamil New Tigers (TNT), with Thanabalasingham as its leader. After he was killed, Prabhakaran took over. At the same time, Nadarajah Thangathurai and Selvarajah Yogachandran (better known by his nom de guerre Kuttimani) were also involved in discussions about an insurgency. They would later (in 1979) create a separate organisation named Tamil Eelam Liberation Organisation (TELO) to campaign for the establishment of an independent Tamil Eelam. These groups, along with another prominent figure of the armed struggle, Ponnuthurai Sivakumaran, were involved in several hit-and-run operations against pro-government Tamil politicians, Sri Lanka Police and civil administration during the early 1970s. These attacks included throwing bombs at the residence and the car of SLFP Jaffna Mayor, Alfred Duraiyappah, placing a bomb at a carnival held in the stadium of Jaffna city (now "Duraiyappah stadium") and Neervely bank robbery. The 1974 Tamil conference incident during which intervention by Sri Lankan police resulted in 11 dead also sparked the anger of these militant groups. Both Sivakumaran and Prabhakaran attempted to assassinate Duraiyappah in revenge for the incident. Sivakumaran committed suicide on 5 June 1974, to evade capture by Police. On 27 July 1975, Prabhakaran assassinated Duraiyappah, who was branded as a "traitor" by TULF and the insurgents alike. Prabhakaran shot and killed the Mayor when he was visiting the Krishnan temple at Ponnalai.

=== Founding and rise to power ===
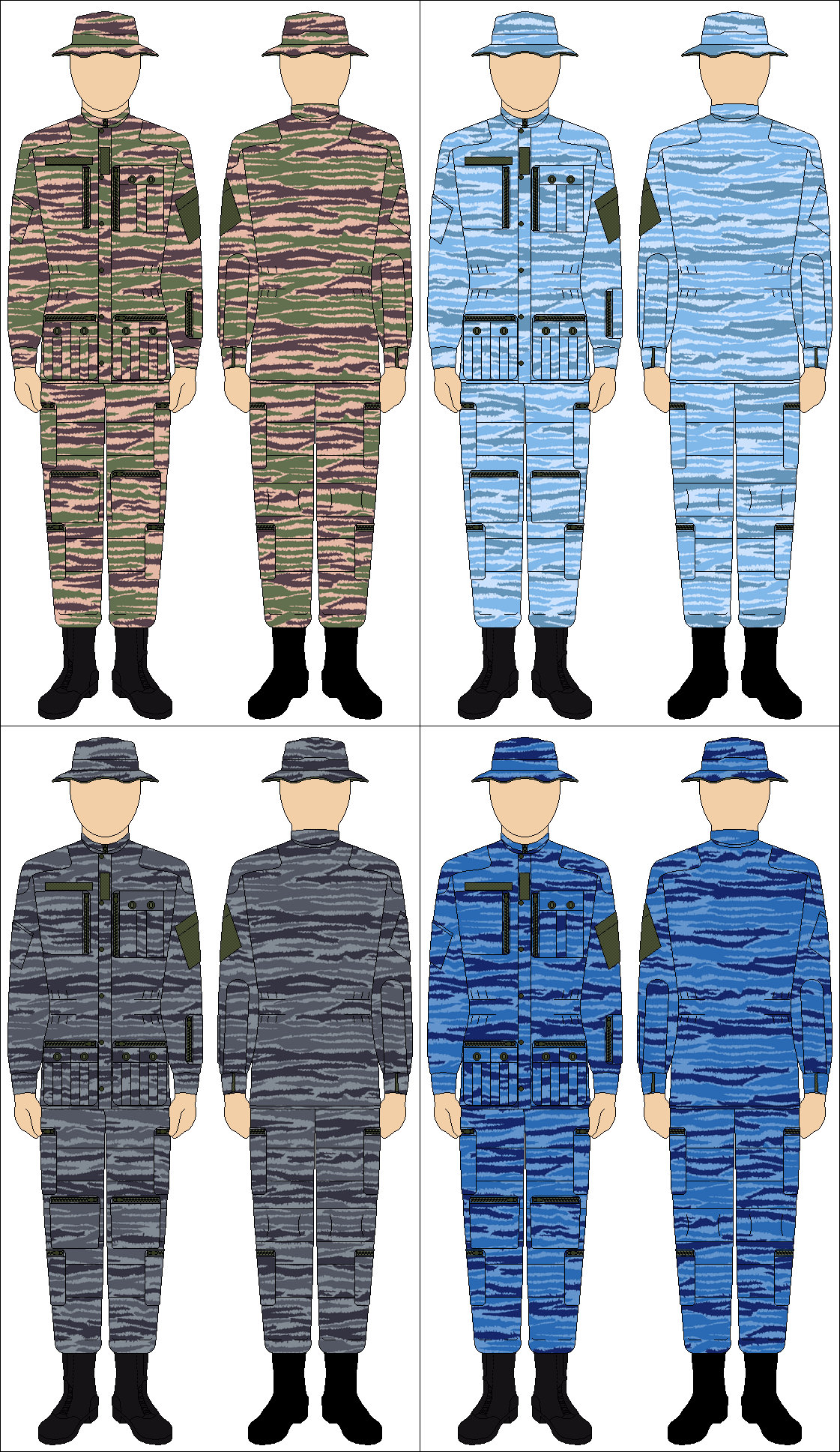
TL: Ground Troops, TR:Air Force, BL: Black Tigers (Suicide Bombers) and BR: Naval Forces

The LTTE was founded on 5 May 1976 as the successor to the Tamil New Tigers. Uma Maheswaran became its leader, and Prabhakaran its military commander. A five-member committee was also appointed. It has been stated that Prabhakaran sought to "refashion the old TNT/new LTTE into an elite, ruthlessly efficient, and highly professional fighting force", by the terrorism expert Rohan Gunaratna. Prabhakaran kept the numbers of the group small and maintained a high standard of training. The LTTE carried out low-key attacks against various government targets, including policemen and local politicians.

==== TULF support ====
Tamil United Liberation Front leader Appapillai Amirthalingam, who was in 1977 elected as the Opposition leader of Sri Lanka Parliament, clandestinely supported the LTTE. Amirthalingam believed that if he could exercise control over the Tamil insurgent groups, it would enhance his political position and pressure the government to agree to grant political autonomy to the Tamils. Thus, he provided letters of reference to the LTTE and to other Tamil insurgent groups to raise funds. Both Uma Maheswaran (a former surveyor) and Urmila Kandiah, the first female member of the LTTE, were prominent members of the TULF youth wing. Maheswaran was the secretary of TULF Tamil Youth Forum, Colombo branch. Amirthalingam introduced Prabhakaran to N. S. Krishnan, who later became the first international representative of LTTE. It was Krishnan who introduced Prabhakaran to Anton Balasingham, who later became the chief political strategist and chief negotiator of LTTE, which split for the first time in 1979. Uma Maheswaran was found to be having a love affair with Urmila Kandiah, which was against the code of conduct of LTTE. Prabhakaran expelled him and Maheswaran formed People's Liberation Organisation of Tamil Eelam (PLOTE) in 1980.

In 1980, Junius Richard Jayewardene's government agreed to devolve power by the means of District Development Councils upon the request of TULF. By this time, LTTE and other insurgent groups wanted a separate state. They had no faith in any sort of political solution. Thus the TULF and other Tamil political parties were steadily marginalized and insurgent groups emerged as the major force in the north. During this period of time, several other insurgent groups came into the arena, such as Eelam Revolutionary Organisation of Students (1975), Tamil Eelam Liberation Organization (1979), PLOTE (1980), Eelam People's Revolutionary Liberation Front (1980) and Tamil Eelam Liberation Army (1982). LTTE ordered civilians to boycott the local government elections of 1983 which TULF contested. Voter turnout became as low as 10%. Thereafter, Tamil political parties were largely unable to represent the Tamil people as insurgent groups took over their position.

==== Thirunelveli attack, 1983 ====
LTTE leaders at Sirumalai camp, Tamil Nadu, India in 1984 while they are being trained by RAW (from L to R, weapon carrying is included within brackets) – Lingam; Prabhakaran's bodyguard (AMD-65), Batticaloa commander Aruna (Beretta Model 38 SMG), LTTE founder-leader Prabhakaran (pistol), Trincomalee commander Pulendran (AK-47), Mannar commander Victor (M203) and Chief of Intelligence Pottu Amman (M 16).

Following a Sri Lankan Army ambush in Meesalai in which two LTTE members were killed including its military commander Seelan, the LTTE sought revenge by launching its first attack on the Army. On 23 July 1983, the LTTE ambushed the Army patrol Four Four Bravo in Thirunelveli, Jaffna, and killed thirteen soldiers. The ambush provided the pretext for the pre-planned Black July pogrom to be unleashed against the Tamil community in which 3,500–4,000 Tamils were killed. Before the pogrom the LTTE had only 30 full-time members. Subsequently, thousands of outraged Tamil youths joined Tamil militant groups to fight the Sri Lankan government, in what is considered a major catalyst to the insurgency in Sri Lanka. Among the notable members to join the LTTE following the pogrom included its eastern commander Karuna Amman, its police chief Balasingham Nadesan and its first suicide attacker Captain Miller.

==== Indian support ====
In reaction to various geopolitical and economic factors, from August 1983 to May 1987, India, through its intelligence agency the Research and Analysis Wing (RAW), provided arms, training and monetary support to six Sri Lankan Tamil insurgent groups including the LTTE. During that period, 32 camps were set up in India to train these 495 LTTE insurgents, including 90 women who were trained in 10 batches. The first batch of Tigers were trained in Establishment 22 based in Chakrata, Uttarakhand. The second batch, including LTTE intelligence chief Pottu Amman, trained in Himachal Pradesh. Prabakaran visited the first and the second batch of Tamil Tigers to see them training. Eight other batches of LTTE were trained in Tamil Nadu. Thenmozhi Rajaratnam alias Dhanu, who carried out the assassination of Rajiv Gandhi and Sivarasan, the key conspirator, were among the militants trained by RAW in Nainital, India. In April 1984, the LTTE formally joined a common militant front, the Eelam National Liberation Front (ENLF), a union between LTTE, TELO, EROS and EPRLF.

==== Clashes with other insurgent groups ====
TELO usually held the Indian view of problems and pushed for India's view during peace talks with Sri Lanka and other groups. LTTE denounced the TELO view and claimed that India was only acting on its own interest. As a result, the LTTE broke from the ENLF in 1986. Soon fighting broke out between the TELO and the LTTE and clashes occurred over the next few months. As a result, almost the entire TELO leadership and at least 400 TELO militants were killed by the LTTE. The LTTE attacked training camps of the EPRLF a few months later, forcing it to withdraw from the Jaffna Peninsula. Notices were issued to the effect that all remaining Tamil insurgents join the LTTE in Jaffna and in Madras, where the Tamil groups were headquartered. With the major groups including the TELO and EPRLF eliminated, the remaining 20 or so Tamil insurgent groups were then absorbed into the LTTE, making Jaffna an LTTE-dominated city.

Another practice that increased support by Tamil people was LTTE's members taking an oath of loyalty which stated LTTE's goal of establishing a state for the Sri Lankan Tamils. LTTE members were prohibited from smoking cigarettes and consuming alcohol in any form. LTTE members were required to avoid their family members and avoid communication with them. Initially, LTTE members were prohibited from having love affairs or sexual relationships as it could deter their prime motive, but this policy changed after Prabhakaran married Mathivathani Erambu in October 1984.

=== IPKF period ===
In July 1987, faced with growing anger among its own Tamils and a flood of refugees, India intervened directly in the conflict for the first time by initially airdropping food parcels into Jaffna. After negotiations, India and Sri Lanka entered into the Indo-Sri Lanka Accord. Though the conflict was between the Tamil and Sinhalese people, India and Sri Lanka signed the peace accord instead of India influencing both parties to sign a peace accord among themselves. The peace accord assigned a certain degree of regional autonomy in the Tamil areas, with Eelam People's Revolutionary Liberation Front (EPRLF) controlling the regional council and called for the Tamil militant groups to surrender. India was to send a peacekeeping force, named the Indian Peace Keeping Force (IPKF), part of the Indian Army, to Sri Lanka to enforce the disarmament and to watch over the regional council. Tamil leaders and militants claimed that after the Accord was signed, the government settled large numbers of Sinhalese in areas of Trincomalee, where security forces and Sinhalese mobs massacred about 200 Tamils and displaced their entire population from the town in 1985.

==== War against IPKF ====
Although the Tamil militant organizations did not have a role in the Indo-Lanka agreement, most groups, including EPRLF, TELO, EROS, and PLOTE, accepted it. LTTE rejected the accord because they opposed EPRLF's Varadaraja Perumal as the chief ministerial candidate for the merged North Eastern Province. The LTTE named three alternate candidates for the position, which India rejected. The LTTE subsequently refused to hand over their weapons to the IPKF. The LTTE's political leader for Jaffna peninsula Thileepan died during a hunger strike directed at the Indian government after it had failed to meet his demands; and on 5 October 12 LTTE cadres detained by the Sri Lankan Navy committed suicide when the Sri Lankan Army attempted to take them to Colombo for interrogation after the IPKF refused to intervene and secure their release under the accord. Major General Harkirat Singh J.N.Dixit and Depinder Singh were against handing over the LTTE cadres to the Sri Lankan Army but due to orders from New Delhi they agreed. The LTTE walked out of the accord after the mass suicide. Harkirat Singh blamed the diplomats and the Army headquarters for the turn of events leading to the conflict.

Thus LTTE engaged in military conflict with the Indian Army, and launched its first attack on an Indian army rations truck on 8 October, killing five Indian para-commandos who were on board by strapping burning tires around their necks. The government of India stated that the IPKF should disarm the LTTE by force. The Indian Army launched assaults on the LTTE, including a month-long campaign, Operation Pawan to win control of the Jaffna Peninsula. The ruthlessness of this campaign, and the Indian army's subsequent anti-LTTE operations, which included civilian massacres and rapes made it extremely unpopular among many Tamils in Sri Lanka.

==== Premadasa government support ====
The Indian intervention was also unpopular among the Sinhalese majority. Prime Minister Ranasinghe Premadasa pledged to withdraw IPKF as soon as he was elected president during his presidential election campaign in 1988. After being elected, in April 1989, he started negotiations with LTTE. President Premadasa ordered the Sri Lanka Army to clandestinely hand over arms consignments to the LTTE to fight the IPKF and its proxy, the Tamil National Army (TNA). These consignments included RPGs, mortars, self-loading rifles, Type 81 assault rifle, T56 automatic rifles, pistols, hand grenades, ammunition, and communications sets. Moreover, millions of dollars were also passed on to the LTTE.

=== After IPKF ===
The last members of the IPKF, which was estimated to have had a strength of well over 100,000 at its peak, left the country in March 1990 upon the request of President Premadasa. Unstable peace initially held between the government and the LTTE, and peace talks progressed towards providing devolution for Tamils in the north and east of the country. A ceasefire held between LTTE and the government from June 1989 to June 1990, but broke down as LTTE massacred 600 police officers in the Eastern Province.

Fighting continued throughout the 1990s, and was marked by two key assassinations carried out by the LTTE: those of former Indian Prime Minister Rajiv Gandhi in 1991, and Sri Lankan President Ranasinghe Premadasa in 1993, using suicide bombers on both occasions. The fighting briefly halted in 1994 following the election of Chandrika Kumaratunga as President of Sri Lanka and the onset of peace talks, but fighting resumed after LTTE sacked two SLN gunboats on 19 April 1995. In a series of military operations that followed, the Sri Lanka Armed Forces recaptured the Jaffna Peninsula. Further offensives followed over the next three years, and the military captured large areas in the north of the country from the LTTE, including areas in the Vanni region, the town of Kilinochchi, and many smaller towns. From 1998 onward, the LTTE regained control of these areas, which culminated in the capture in April 2000 of the strategically important Elephant Pass base complex, located at the entrance of the Jaffna Peninsula, after prolonged fighting against the Sri Lanka Army.

Mahattaya, a one-time deputy leader of LTTE, was accused of treason by the LTTE and killed in 1994. He is said to have collaborated with the Indian Research and Analysis Wing to remove Prabhakaran from the LTTE leadership.

=== 2002 ceasefire ===
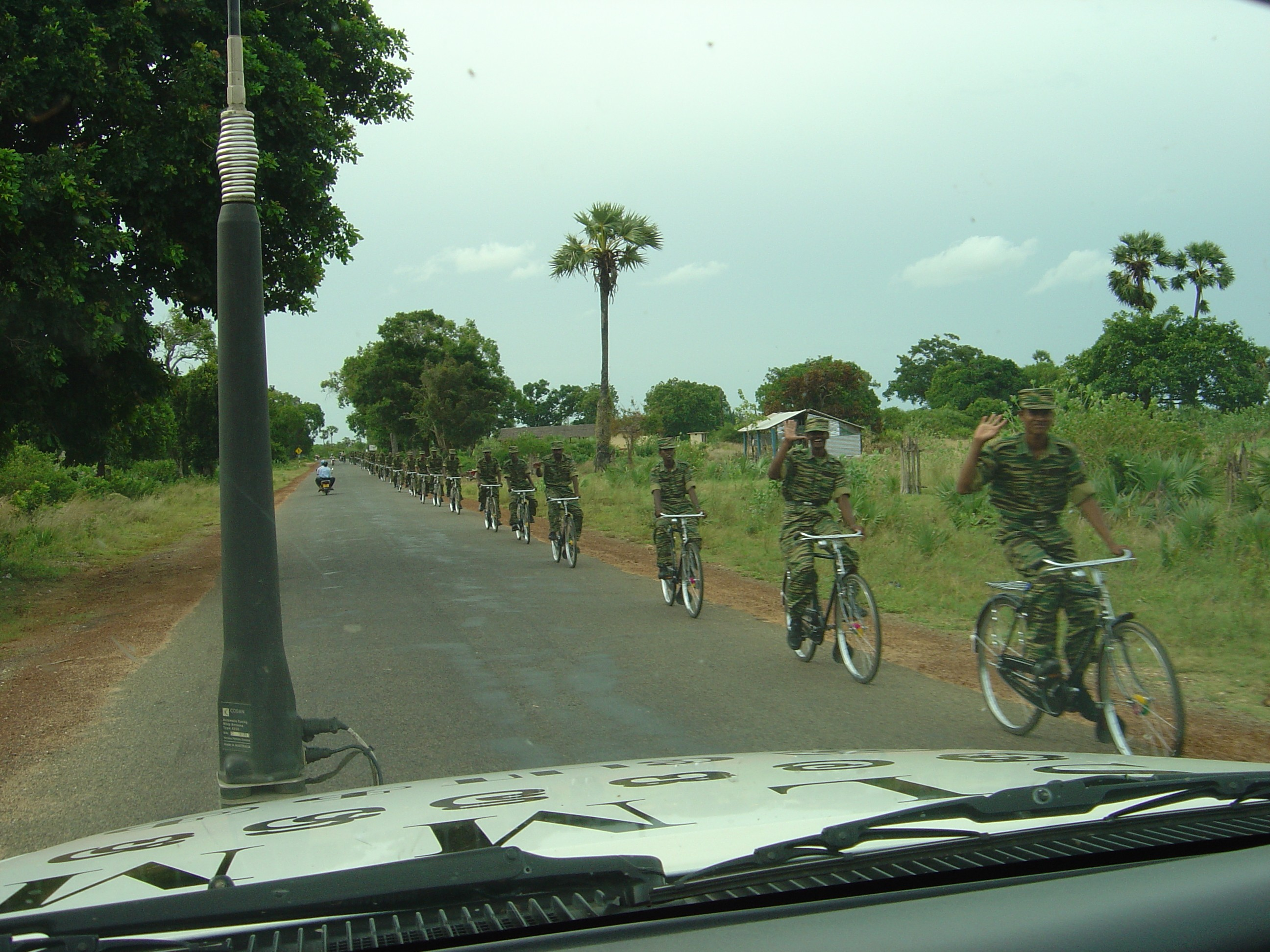
An LTTE bicycle infantry platoon north of Kilinochchi in 2004

In 2002, the LTTE dropped its demand for a separate state, instead demanding a form of regional autonomy. Following the landslide election defeat of Kumaratunga and Ranil Wickramasinghe coming to power in December 2001, the LTTE declared a unilateral ceasefire. The Sri Lankan Government agreed to the ceasefire, and in March 2002 the Ceasefire Agreement (CFA) was signed. As part of the agreement, Norway and other Nordic countries agreed to jointly monitor the ceasefire through the Sri Lanka Monitoring Mission.

Six rounds of peace talks between the Government of Sri Lanka and LTTE were held, but they were temporarily suspended after the LTTE pulled out of the talks in 2003 claiming "certain critical issues relating to the ongoing peace process". In 2003 the LTTE proposed an Interim Self-Governing Authority (ISGA). This move was approved of by the international community but rejected by the Sri Lankan President. The LTTE boycotted the presidential election in December 2005. While LTTE claimed that the people under its control were free to vote, it is alleged that they used threats to prevent the population from voting. The United States condemned this.

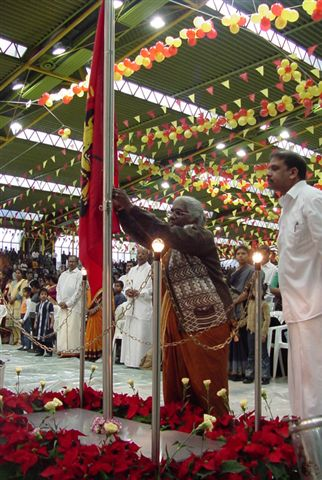
A mother of a dead LTTE cadre raises the Tamil Eelam flag on Maaveerar Naal 2002 in Germany

The new government of Sri Lanka came into power in 2006 and demanded to abrogate the ceasefire agreement, stating that the ethnic conflict could only have a military solution, and that the only way to achieve this was by eliminating the LTTE. Further peace talks were scheduled in Oslo, Norway, on 8 and 9 June 2006, but cancelled when the LTTE refused to meet directly with the government delegation, stating its fighters were not being allowed safe passage to travel to the talks. Norwegian mediator Erik Solheim told journalists that the LTTE should take direct responsibility for the collapse of the talks. Rifts grew between the government and LTTE, and resulted in a number of ceasefire agreement violations by both sides during 2006. Suicide attacks, military skirmishes, and air raids took place during the latter part of 2006. Between February 2002 to May 2007, the Sri Lanka Monitoring Mission documented 3,830 ceasefire violations by the LTTE, with respect to 351 by the security forces. Military confrontation continued into 2007 and 2008. In January 2008 the government officially pulled out of the Cease Fire Agreement.

=== Dissension ===
In the most significant show of dissent from within the organisation, a senior LTTE commander named Colonel Karuna (nom de guerre of Vinayagamoorthi Muralitharan) broke away from the LTTE in March 2004 and formed the TamilEela Makkal Viduthalai Pulikal (later Tamil Makkal Viduthalai Pulikal), amid allegations that the northern commanders were overlooking the needs of the eastern Tamils. The LTTE leadership accused him of mishandling funds and questioned him about his recent personal behaviour. He tried to take control of the eastern province from the LTTE, which caused clashes between the LTTE and TMVP. The LTTE suggested that TMVP was backed by the government, and the Nordic SLMM monitors corroborated this. It was later revealed that UNP Member of Parliament Seyed Ali Zahir Moulana had played an important role in the defection of Colonel Karuna from the LTTE to the Government.

=== Military defeat ===
Mahinda Rajapaksa was elected as the president of Sri Lanka in 2005. After a brief period of negotiations, LTTE pulled out of peace talks indefinitely. Sporadic violence had continued and on 25 April 2006, LTTE tried to assassinate Sri Lankan Army Commander Lieutenant General Sarath Fonseka. Following the attack, the European Union proscribed the LTTE as a terrorist organisation. A new crisis leading to the first large-scale fighting since signing of the ceasefire occurred when the LTTE closed the sluice gates of the Mavil Oya (Mavil Aru) reservoir on 21 July 2006, and cut the water supply to 15,000 villages in government controlled areas. This dispute developed into a full-scale war by August 2006.

After the breakdown of the peace process in 2006, the Sri Lankan military launched a major offensive against the Tigers, defeating the LTTE militarily and bringing the entire country under its control. Human rights groups criticised the nature of the victory which included the internment of Tamil civilians in concentration camps with little or no access to outside agencies. Victory over the Tigers was declared by Sri Lankan President Mahinda Rajapaksa on 16 May 2009, and the LTTE admitted defeat on 17 May 2009. Prabhakaran was killed by government forces on 19 May 2009. Selvarasa Pathmanathan succeeded Prabhakaran as leader of the LTTE, but he was later arrested in Malaysia and handed over to the Sri Lankan government in August 2009.

==== Defeat in the East ====
Eelam War IV had commenced in the East. Mavil Aru came under the control of the Sri Lanka Army by 15 August 2006. Systematically, Sampoor, Vakarai, Kanjikudichchi Aru and Batticaloa also came under military control. The military then captured Thoppigala, the Tiger stronghold in Eastern Province on 11 July 2007. IPKF had failed to capture it from LTTE during its offensive in 1988.

==== Defeat in the North ====
Sporadic fighting had been happening in the North for months, but the intensity of the clashes increased after September 2007. Gradually, the defence lines of the LTTE began to fall. The advancing military confined the LTTE into rapidly diminishing areas in the North. Earlier, on 2 November 2007, S. P. Thamilselvan, who was the head of the rebels' political wing, was killed during another government air raid. On 2 January 2008, the Sri Lankan government officially abandoned the ceasefire agreement. By 2 August 2008, LTTE lost the Mannar District following the fall of Vellankulam town. Troops captured Pooneryn and Mankulam during the final months of 2008.

On 2 January 2009, the President of Sri Lanka, Mahinda Rajapaksa, announced that the Sri Lankan troops had captured Kilinochchi, the city which the LTTE had used for over a decade as its de facto administrative capital. On the same day, President Rajapaksa called upon LTTE to surrender. It was stated that the loss of Kilinochchi had caused substantial damage to the LTTE's public image, and that the LTTE was likely to collapse under military pressure on multiple fronts. As of 8 January 2009, the LTTE abandoned its positions on the Jaffna peninsula to make a last stand in the jungles of Mullaitivu, their last main base. The Jaffna Peninsula was captured by the Sri Lankan Army by 14 January. On 25 January 2009, SLA troops "completely captured" Mullaitivu town, the last major LTTE stronghold.

President Mahinda Rajapaksa declared military victory over the Tamil Tigers on 16 May 2009, after 26 years of conflict. The rebels offered to lay down their weapons in return for a guarantee of safety. On 17 May 2009, LTTE's head of the Department of International Relations, Selvarasa Pathmanathan conceded defeat, saying in an email statement, "this battle has reached its bitter end".

==== Aftermath ====
With the end of the hostilities, 11,664 LTTE members, including 595 child soldiers surrendered to the Sri Lankan military. Approximately 150 hardcore LTTE cadres and 1,000 mid-level cadres escaped to India. The government detained surrendered cadres for "rehabilitation" under a National Action Plan for the Re-integration of Ex-combatants while allegations of torture, rape and murder of detainees were reported by international human rights bodies. They were divided into three categories; hardcore, non-combatants, and those who were forcibly recruited (including child soldiers). Twenty-four rehabilitation centres were set up in Jaffna, Batticaloa, and Vavuniya. Among the apprehended cadres, there had been about 700 hardcore members. Some of these cadres were integrated into the State Intelligence Service to tackle the internal and external networks of LTTE. By August 2011, the government had released more than 8,000 cadres, and 2,879 remained.

=== Continued operations ===
After the death of LTTE leader Prabhakaran and the most powerful members of the organisation, Selvarasa Pathmanathan (alias KP) was its sole first generation leader left alive. He assumed duty as the new leader of LTTE on 21 July 2009. A statement was issued, allegedly from the executive committee of the LTTE, stating that Pathmanathan had been appointed leader of the LTTE. 15 days after the announcement, on 5 August 2009, a Sri Lankan military intelligence unit, with the collaboration of local authorities, captured Pathmanathan in the Tune Hotel, in downtown Kuala Lumpur, Malaysia. Sri Lanka Ministry of Defence alleges that Perinpanayagam Sivaparan alias Nediyavan of the Tamil Eelam People's Alliance (TEPA) in Norway, Suren Surendiran of British Tamils Forum (BTF), Father S. J. Emmanuel of Global Tamil Forum (GTF), Visvanathan Rudrakumaran of Transnational Government of Tamil Eelam (TGTE) and Sekarapillai Vinayagamoorthy alias Kathirgamathamby Arivazhagan alias Vinayagam, a former senior intelligence leader are trying to revive the organisation among the Tamil diaspora. Subsequently, in May 2011, Nediyavan, who advocates an armed struggle against the Sri Lankan state, was arrested and released on bail in Norway, pending further investigation.

== Divisions ==
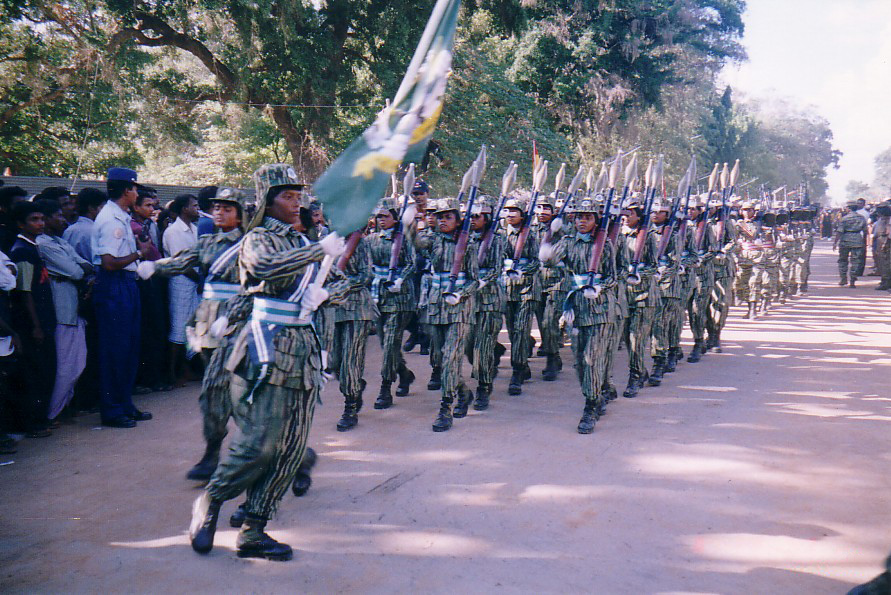
LTTE women's wing marching in a parade.

The LTTE was viewed as a disciplined and militarised group with a leader of a significant military and organisational skills. Three major divisions of the LTTE were the military, intelligence, and political wings.

The military wing consisted of at least 11 separate divisions including the conventional fighting forces, Charles Anthony Regiment and Jeyanthan Regiment; the suicide wing called the Black Tigers; naval wing Sea Tigers, air-wing Air Tigers, LTTE leader Prabhakaran's personal security divisions, Imran Pandian regiment and Ratha regiment; auxiliary military units such as Kittu artillery brigade, Kutti Sri mortar brigade, Ponnamman mining unit and hit-and-run squads like Pistol gang. Charles Anthony brigade was the first conventional fighting formation created by LTTE. The Sea Tiger division was founded in 1984, under the leadership of Thillaiyampalam Sivanesan alias Soosai. LTTE acquired its first light aircraft in the late 1990s. Vaithilingam Sornalingam alias Shankar was instrumental in creating the Air Tigers. It carried out nine air attacks since 2007, including a suicide air raid targeting Sri Lanka Air Force headquarters, Colombo in February 2009. LTTE was the only rebel organisation to have an air force. LTTE intelligence wing consisted of Tiger Organisation Security Intelligence Service aka TOSIS, run by Pottu Amman, and a separate military intelligence division. The LTTE cadres were required to follow a strict code of conduct which included prohibition on smoking and consumption of alcohol, with sexual relationships also being regulated. Each member carried a cyanide capsule to commit suicide in case of capture.

Aircraft that had been in LTTE possession by 2006
Type of Aircraft	Quantity
Microlight aircraft	2
Zlín Z 143	5
Helicopters	2
Unmanned aerial vehicles	2

The LTTE operated a systematic and powerful political wing, which functioned like a separate state in the LTTE controlled area. In 1989, it established a political party named People's Front of Liberation Tigers, under Gopalaswamy Mahendraraja alias Mahattaya. It was abandoned soon after. Later, S. P. Thamilselvan was appointed the head of the political wing. He was also a member of the LTTE delegation for Norwegian brokered peace talks. After the death of Thamilselvan in November 2007, Balasingham Nadesan was appointed as its leader. Major sections within the political wing include International peace secretariat, led by Pulidevan, LTTE Police, LTTE court, Bank of Tamil Eelam, Sports division and the "Voice of Tigers" radio broadcasting station of LTTE.

LTTE used female cadres for military engagements. Its women's wing consisted of Malathi and Sothiya Brigades.

== Governance ==
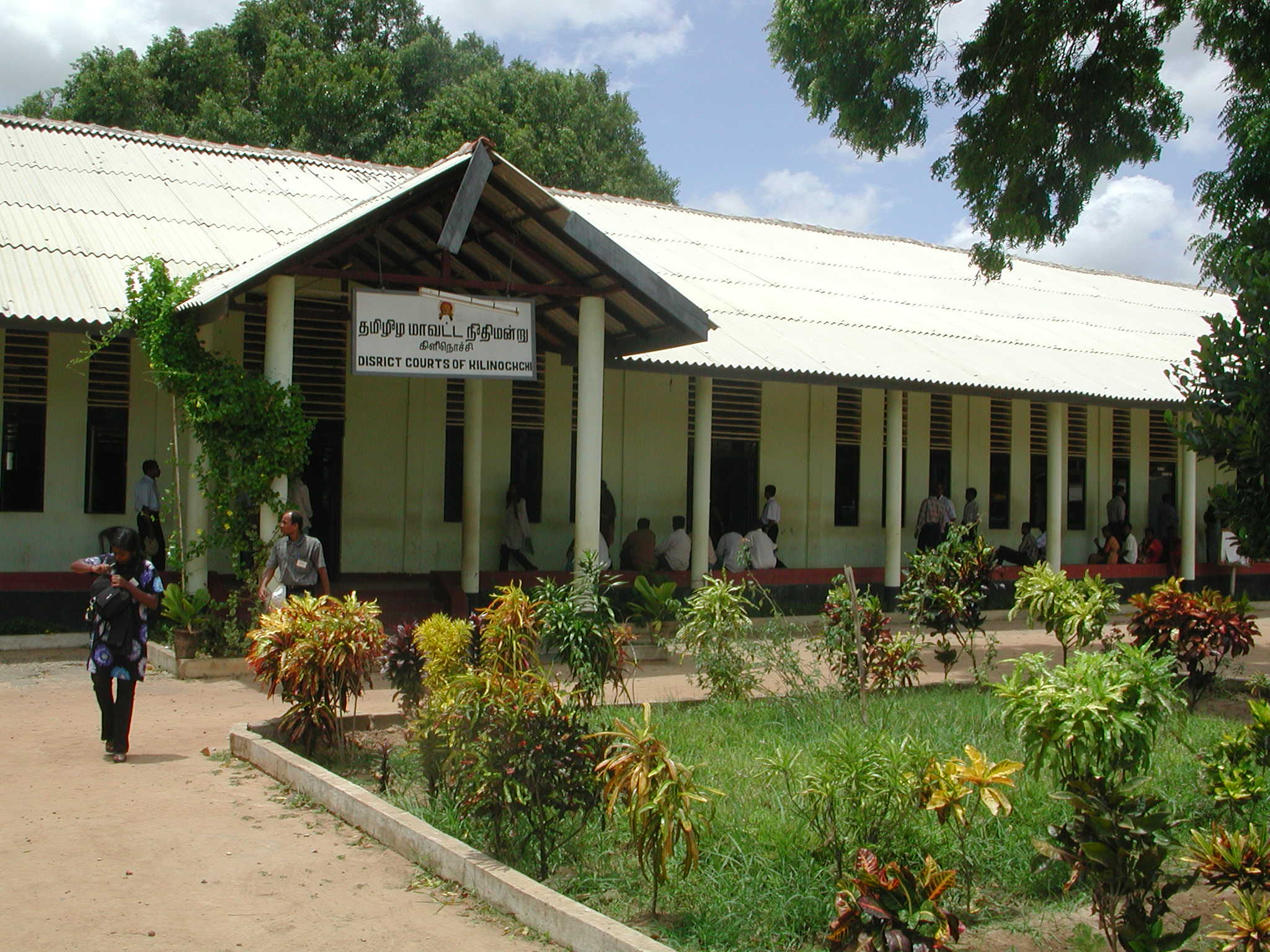
Kilinochchi District court in LTTE-administered Tamil Eelam

During its active years, the LTTE had established and administered a de facto state under its control, named Tamil Eelam with Kilinochchi as its administrative capital, and had managed a government in its territory, providing state functions such as courts, a police force, a human rights organisation, and a humanitarian assistance board, a health board, and an education board. However, the court system, composed of young judges with little or no legal training had operated without codified or defined legal authority, and essentially operated as agents of the LTTE rather than as an independent judiciary. It ran a bank (Bank of Tamil Eelam), a radio station (Voice of Tigers) and a television station (National Television of Tamil Eelam). In the LTTE-controlled areas, women reported lower levels of domestic violence because "the Tigers had a de facto justice system to deal with domestic violence." The United States Department of State described LTTE's governance as an "authoritarian military rule" that violated civil liberties and discriminated against minorities.

In 2003, the LTTE issued a proposal to establish an Interim Self-Governing Authority in the eight districts of the North and East which it controlled. The ISGA was to be entrusted with powers such as the right to impose law, collect taxes and oversee the rehabilitation process until a favourable solution was reached after which elections would be held. The ISGA would consist of members representing the LTTE, GoSL and the Muslim community. According to the proposal, this LTTE administration intended to be a secular one with principal emphasis on prohibition of discrimination and protection of all communities.

=== Local perception and support ===
Due to its military victories, policies, call for national self-determination and constructive Tamil nationalist platform, the LTTE was supported by major sections of the Tamil community. Based on the survey of the Jaffna population by the BBC and Reuters journalists, a U.S. diplomatic cable from 1994 stated that support for the LTTE was fairly strong among the Jaffna population who admired the discipline of the LTTE's administrative service, and that majority of Jaffna residents would choose the LTTE over the Sri Lankan Army given the choice. According to the assessments by independent observers, the LTTE administration of justice gained "significant social acceptance", and its courts were broadly seen as "more efficient, less expensive, and less vulnerable to corruption than their Sri Lankan counterparts." The LTTE police force also had "a high degree of legitimacy" among Tamil civilians who viewed it as "an uncorrupt and important stabilizing factor in the region." A survey carried out by the Centre for Policy Alternatives in 2002 from a sample of 89 Sri Lankan Tamils found that 89% regarded the LTTE as their sole representatives.

However, University Teachers for Human Rights (Jaffna), a local human rights NGO that has been accused of anti-LTTE bias by some critics, claimed that "by combination of internal terror and narrow nationalist ideology the LTTE succeeded in atomising the community. It took away not only the right to oppose but even the right to evaluate, as a community, the course they were taking. This gives a semblance of illusion that the whole society is behind the LTTE." After meeting with the Tamil civil society in Jaffna in 2001, Jehan Perera, the executive director of the National Peace Council of Sri Lanka, observed that fear was not the only factor that impelled civic groups in Jaffna to speak in favour of the LTTE but that the Jaffna people had recognized the LTTE's military strength and pragmatically accepted it as the main player in achieving a negotiated settlement.

== Ideology ==
The LTTE was a self-styled national liberation organisation with the primary goal of establishing an independent Tamil state. Tamil nationalism was the primary basis of its ideology. LTTE claimed to strive for a democratic, secular state that is based on socialism. Its leader Velupillai Prabhakaran was influenced by Indian freedom fighters such as Subhas Chandra Bose. The organisation denied being a separatist movement and saw itself as fighting for self-determination and restoration of sovereignty in what it recognised as Tamil homeland. Although most Tigers were Hindus, the LTTE was an avowedly secular organisation; religion did not play any significant part in its ideology. Prabhakaran criticised what he saw as the oppressive features of traditional Hindu Tamil society, such as the caste system and gender inequality. The LTTE presented itself as a revolutionary movement seeking widespread change within Tamil society, not just independence from the Sri Lankan state. Therefore, its ideology called for the removal of caste discrimination and support for women's liberation. Prabhakaran described his political philosophy as "revolutionary socialism", with the goal of creating an "egalitarian society". However, by 2002 with the shift in geopolitical climate, Prabhakaran endorsed "open market economy", but he pointed out that the question about the proper economic system can be considered only after the ethnic problem had been solved.

== Global network ==
LTTE had developed a large international network since the days of N. S. Krishnan, who served as its first international representative. In the late 1970s, TULF parliamentarian and opposition leader A. Amirthalingam provided letters of reference for fundraising, and V. N. Navaratnam, who was an executive committee member of the Inter-Parliamentary Union (IPU), introduced many influential and wealthy Tamils living overseas to Tamil insurgent leaders. Navaratnam also introduced LTTE members to the members of Polisario Front, a national liberation movement in Morocco, at a meeting held in Oslo, Norway. In 1978, during the world tour of Amirthalingam (with London-based Eelam activist S. K. Vaikundavasan), he formed the World Tamil Coordinating Committee (WTCC), which was later found to be an LTTE front organisation. The global contacts of LTTE grew steadily since then. At the height of its power, LTTE had 42 offices worldwide. The international network of LTTE engages in propaganda, fundraising, arms procurement, and shipping.

There were three types of organisations that engage in propaganda and fund raising—Front, Cover, and Sympathetic. Prior to the ethnic riots of 1983, attempts to raise funds for a sustaining military campaign were not realised. It was the mass exodus of Tamil civilians to India and western countries following the Black July ethnic riots, which made this possible. As the armed conflict evolved and voluntary donations lessened, LTTE used force and threats to collect money. LTTE was worth US$200–300 million at its peak. The group's global network owned numerous business ventures in various countries. These include investment in real estate, shipping, grocery stores, gold and jewellery stores, gas stations, restaurants, production of films, mass media organisations (TV, radio, print), and industries. It was also in control of numerous charitable organisations, which included, according to the U.S. Department of the Treasury, the Tamils Rehabilitation Organisation.

Arms Procurement and shipping activities of LTTE were largely clandestine. Prior to 1983, it procured weapons mainly from Afghanistan via the Indo-Pakistani border. Explosives were purchased from commercial markets in India. From 1983 to 1987, LTTE acquired a substantial amount of weapons from RAW and from Lebanon, Cyprus, Singapore, and Malaysia-based arms dealers. LTTE received its first consignment of arms from Singapore in 1984 on board the MV Cholan, the first ship owned by the organisation. Funds were received and cargo cleared at Chennai Port with the assistance of M. G. Ramachandran, the Chief Minister of Tamil Nadu. In November 1994, the LTTE was able to purchase 60 tonnes of explosives (50 tonnes of TNT and 10 tonnes of RDX) from Rubezone Chemical plant in Ukraine, providing a forged Bangladeshi Ministry of Defence end-user certificate. Payments for the explosives were made from a Citibank account in Singapore held by Selvarasa Pathmanathan. Consignment was transported on board MV Sewne. The same explosives were used for the Central Bank bombing in 1996. Myanmar, Thailand, Malaysia, Cambodia and Indonesia remained the most trusted outposts of LTTE, after India alienated it following the assassination of Rajiv Gandhi.

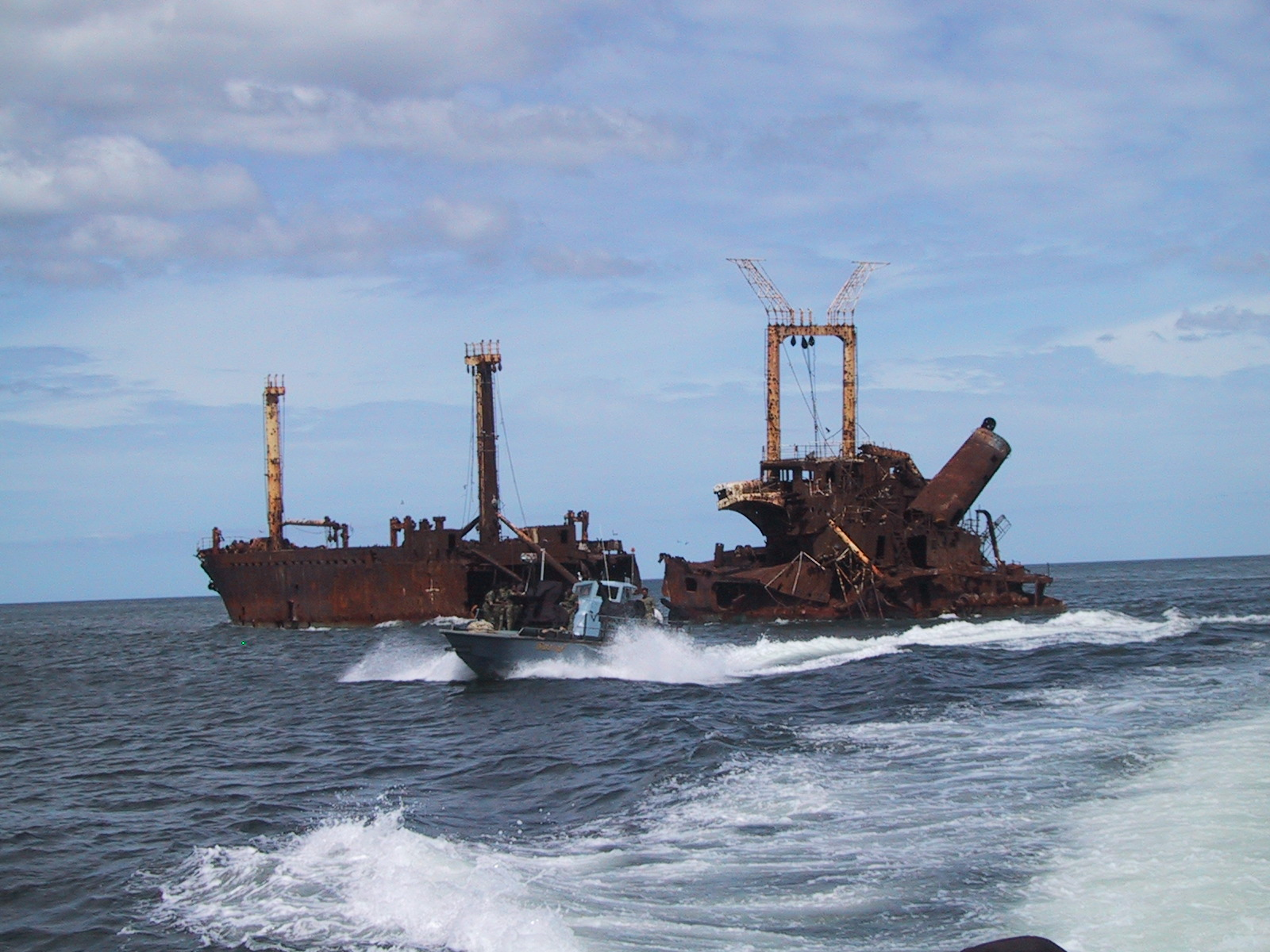
A LTTE Sea Tiger fast attack fibreglass boat passing a Sri Lankan freighter sunk by the Sea Tigers just north of the village of Mullaitivu, North-eastern Sri Lanka

According to Rohan Gunaratna, since late 1997, North Korea became the principal country to provide arms, ammunition, and explosives to the LTTE. The deal with North Korean government was carried out by Ponniah Anandaraja alias Aiyannah, a member of World Tamil Coordinating Committee of the United States and later, the accountant of LTTE. According to the Sri Lankan government, he worked at the North Korean embassy in Bangkok since late 1997. LTTE had nearly 20-second-hand ships, which were purchased in Japan, and registered in Panama and other Latin American countries. These ships mostly transported general cargo, including paddy, sugar, timber, glass, and fertilizer. But when an arms deal was finalized, they travelled to North Korea, loaded the cargo and brought it to the equator, where the ships were based. Then on board merchant tankers, weapons were transferred to the sea of Alampil, just outside the territorial waters in Sri Lanka's exclusive economic zone. After that, small teams of Sea Tigers brought the cargo ashore. The Sri Lanka Navy, during 2005–08 destroyed at least 11 of these cargo ships belonged to LTTE in the international waters.

LTTE's last shipment of weapons was in March 2009, towards the end of the war. The merchant vessel Princess Iswari went from Indonesia to North Korea under captain Kamalraj Kandasamy alias Vinod, loaded the weapons and came back to international waters beyond Sri Lanka. But due to the heavy naval blockades set up by the Sri Lankan Navy, it could not deliver the arms consignment. Thus it dumped the weapons in the sea. The same ship, after changing its name to MV Ocean Lady, arrived in Vancouver with 76 migrants, in October 2009. In December 2009, The Sri Lankan Navy apprehended a merchant vessel belonging to LTTE, Princess Chrisanta in Indonesia and brought it back to Sri Lanka.

The United States Senate Committee on Foreign Relations (USSFRC) and Ethiopian based Jimma Times claimed that the Eritrean government had provided direct military assistance, including light aircraft to LTTE, during the 2002–03 period when the LTTE was negotiating with the Sri Lankan government via the Norwegian mediators. It was also alleged that Erik Solheim, the chief Norwegian facilitator, helped LTTE to establish this relationship. These allegations and a suspicion from within the Sri Lankan armed forces, that LTTE had considerable connections and assets in Eritrea and that its leader Prabhakaran might try to flee to Eritrea in the final stages of war, prompted the Sri Lankan government to establish diplomatic relations with Eritrea in 2009.

In 2013, Thiruthanikan Thanigasalam and Sahilal Sabaratnam were sentenced to 25 years in prison in Brooklyn in connection of attempting to purchase high-powered weaponry for the LTTE. They were caught in a FBI undercover sting operation while attempting to purchase surface-to-air missiles, missile launchers, and assault rifles.

== Proscription as a terrorist group ==
Thirty-three countries currently list the LTTE as a terrorist organization. As of October 2019, these include:

- India (since 1992)
- United States (designated as Foreign Terrorist Organizations by the Department of State since 8 October 1997. Named as a Specially Designated Global Terrorist (SDGT) since 2 November 2001)
- United Kingdom (designated a Proscribed Terrorist Group under the Terrorism Act 2000 since 29 March 2001)
- European Union (since 2006; 27 countries)
- Canada (since 2006)
- Sri Lanka (from January 1998 to 4 September 2002, and again from 7 January 2009)
- Malaysia (since 2014)

The framing of terrorism, despite having no universally accepted definition, carries a connotation of moral illegitimacy and, as proscription, is used by states to criminalize their opponents and justify "extreme" measures against them. In the Sri Lankan context, proscription is also used to delegitimize the LTTE's political objective of establishing an independent state. There is resistance in the international community to the alteration of state boundaries by force and no state recognized Tamil claim of self-determination. The proscriptions by Western states reflected their opposition to LTTE's political objective than concern about its threat to their own national security. Moreover, despite its human rights abuses, Western states regarded Sri Lanka as a democratic ally in their promotion of a global liberal order and were committed to upholding its sovereignty. Hence, proscription was also used by these states to shape the conduct of the LTTE and Tamil diaspora to align with their foreign policy aims.

The first country to ban the LTTE was its brief ally, India, following the assassination of Rajiv Gandhi in 1991. The Indian change of policy came gradually, starting with the IPKF-LTTE conflict and culminating with the assassination. India opposes the proposed Tamil Eelam that LTTE wanted to establish, fearing that it would lead to Tamil Nadu's separation from India despite its integration into the national mainstream. In 2012 after the LTTE's defeat, the Indian Government extended the ban on the LTTE on the grounds of its alleged "strong anti-India posture and threat to the security of Indian nationals".

Sri Lanka first banned the LTTE in 1998, lifted the ban before signing the ceasefire agreement in 2002 and reintroduced the ban in 2009.

The United States proscribed the LTTE as a foreign terrorist organization in October 1997. A U.S. ambassador later explained that the main rationale behind the ban was to prevent LTTE's fundraising and for it to negotiate with the Sri Lankan government. The Pentagon had launched a military programme in March 1996 to train the Sri Lankan military after a series of LTTE attacks which affected U.S. commercial interests on the island but it failed to weaken the LTTE due to its procurement of conventional weapons with funds raised overseas. In 2003, the U.S. Deputy Secretary of State, Richard Armitage, urged the LTTE to renounce its armed struggle for separate state and to accept the Sri Lankan government's sovereignty in order for the proscription to be lifted.

The European Union (EU) banned LTTE as a terrorist organization on 17 May 2006. In a statement, the European Parliament said that the LTTE did not represent all Tamils and called on it to "allow for political pluralism and alternate democratic voices in the northern and eastern parts of Sri Lanka". Pressure from the United States, which assisted Sri Lanka's war efforts, played a critical role in getting Canada and the EU to ban the LTTE. The then Sri Lankan Foreign Minister Mangala Samaraweera later recounted that there was a difficulty in adopting the ban as a unanimous decision due to the opposition from seven countries in the 25-member EU and that consensus was finally achieved only after he had met with the US Secretary of State Condoleezza Rice several times. Swedish Major General Ulf Henricsson, the head of the Sri Lanka Monitoring Mission (SLMM) whom the EU had consulted before the ban, opposed the ban, warning it gave the Sri Lankan government "carte blanche" to seek a military solution. He warned the EU in a memo that a ban would lead to an increase in attacks and violence. He later described the ban as a decision made in the "coffee shops in Brussels" where EU members had failed to read the memo carefully. He further stated that as part of the global war on terror the EU listened to only the Sri Lankan government's version of events and that the government should have also been listed as it "used the same methods".

In October 2014, the European Court of Justice (ECJ) annulled the anti-terrorism sanctions and several other restrictions placed on the LTTE in 2006. The court noted that the basis of proscribing the LTTE had been based on "imputations derived from the press and the Internet" rather than on direct investigation of the group's actions, as required by law. Later, in March 2015, the EU reimposed the sanctions and restrictions. In July 2017, the LTTE was removed from the terrorism blacklist of the EU's top court, stating that there was no evidence to show of LTTE carrying out attacks after its military defeat in 2009. However, despite the ECJ ruling, the EU stated the LTTE remains listed as a terrorist organization by the EU.

On 12 November 2014, the Malaysian government listed the by-then defunct LTTE as a terrorist group amid allegations of its revival attempts in the country. Referring to a letter he purportedly wrote on 12 February 2020 as the Prime Minister to the Ministry of Home Affairs requesting the LTTE's removal from its list of terrorist groups, former Malaysian premier Mahathir Mohamad later explained that the LTTE had not harmed Malaysia and that a group should not be labelled as terrorists simply because other countries do so, since he had met with the leader of the Hamas despite the U.S. having banned it as a terrorist organization. However, responding to the suggestion of the Attorney General (AG) to review the list of gazetted terrorist organizations after the AG dropped charges against 12 alleged LTTE sympathizers, then Minister of Home Affairs Muhyiddin Yassin stated on 22 February 2020 that the LTTE would remain listed as a terrorist organization, claiming its "ideology" posed threat to Malaysia's public order and security. Yassin, a Malay nationalist, has been accused of using the ban to mastermind the "politically motivated" arrests of Indian Tamil members of the Democratic Action Party over alleged LTTE links.

The LTTE leader Prabhakaran contested the terrorist designation of his organization, asserting that the international community had been influenced by the "false propaganda" of the Sri Lankan state and said that there was no coherent definition of the concept of terrorism. He also maintained that the LTTE was a national liberation organization fighting against "state terrorism" and "racist oppression". He urged Western powers engaged in the war on terror to provide "a clear and comprehensive definition of the concept of terrorism that would distinguish between freedom struggles based on the right to self-determination and blind terrorist acts based on fanaticism." He also complained that human rights violators such as Sri Lanka joining the alliance in the war on terror posed threat to "the legitimate political struggles of the oppressed humanity".

== Suicide attacks ==
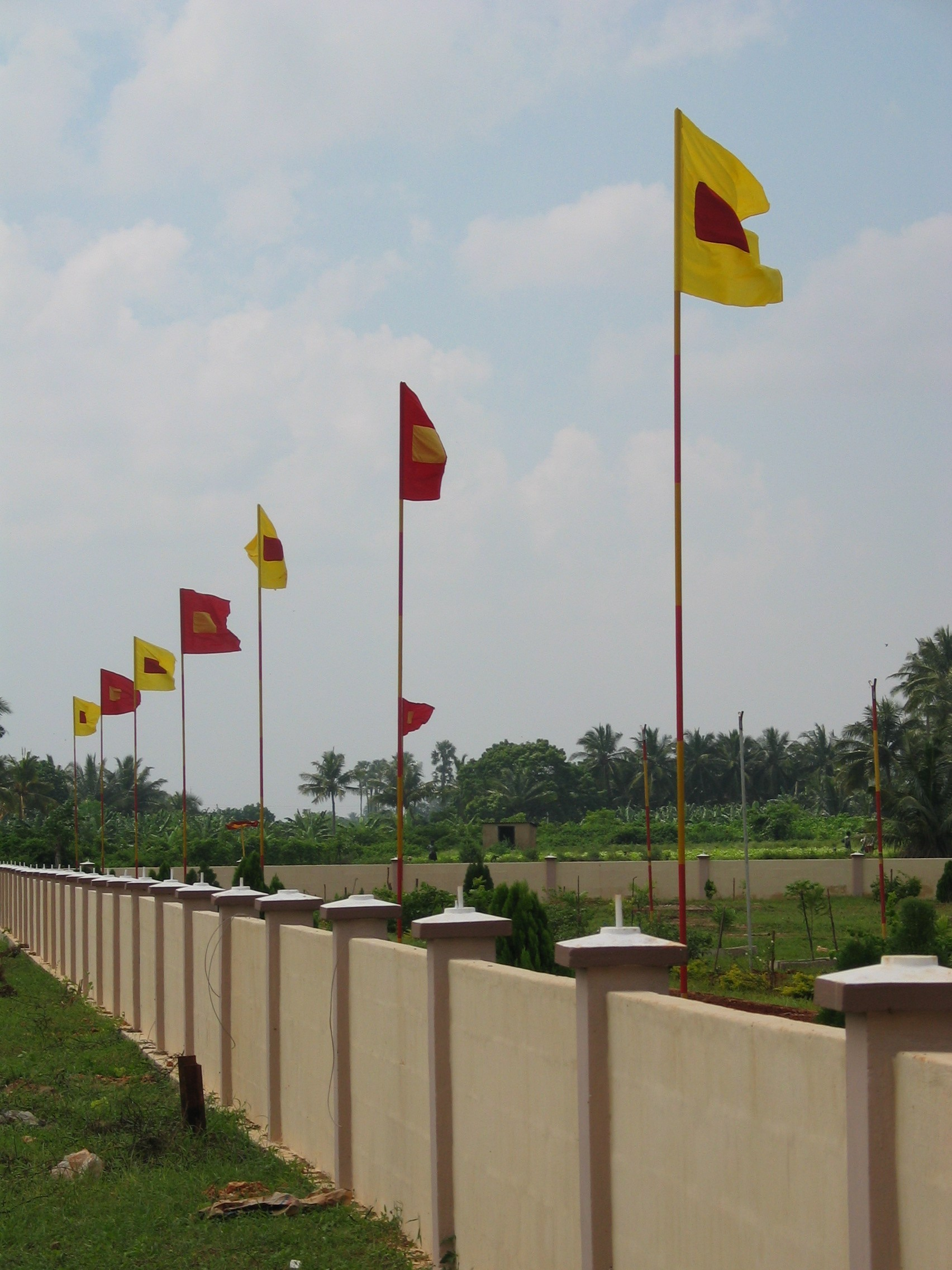
Kopay memorial for fallen Tamil combatants

One of the main divisions of LTTE included the Black Tigers, an elite fighting wing of the movement, whose mission included carrying out suicide attacks against enemy targets. The LTTE conducted its first suicide attack on 5 July 1987 when Captain Miller rammed a truck filled with explosives into a Sri Lankan Army base in Jaffna killing scores of soldiers. Black Tigers as a division would be established years later. Its two strategic purposes were to compensate for the LTTE's lack of heavy weaponry and to serve as a commando unit to access difficult targets. Its members were carefully selected and underwent intense training.

According to the International Institute for Strategic Studies, LTTE was the first insurgent organization to use concealed explosive belts and vests. According to the Sri Lankan Ministry of Defence, the LTTE stated that out of the deceased Black Tigers, 274 were male and 104 were female. Experts estimated that the Black Tigers had carried out most of the suicide attacks recorded around the world by the time the Sri Lankan civil war ended in 2009. The LTTE is credited with popularizing the tactic globally. However, most of the LTTE suicide attacks were carried out against military targets in the north and east of the country; a quarter had been political assassinations and unlike other groups the LTTE primarily used such attacks as part of its insurgency strategy rather than to terrorize civilians. Sometimes civilians were also killed such as in the 1998 attack on Dalada Maligawa killing eight civilians.

The Black Tiger wing also carried out attacks on several high-profile political figures. Three notable attacks includes the assassination of Rajiv Gandhi, the former Prime Minister of India, on 21 May 1991, the assassination of Ranasinghe Premadasa, the President of Sri Lanka, on 1 May 1993, and the failed assassination attempt of Chandrika Kumaratunga, the Sri Lankan President, on 18 December 1999, which resulted in the loss of her right eye.

Black Tiger cadres killed in action were highly glorified and their families were given the "Maaveerar family" status, just like normal LTTE cadres. Also, these families were honoured with the "Thamizheezha Maravar pathakkam" (Warrior medal of Tamil Eelam), one of the higher honours of Tamil Eelam. Black Tiger members were given a chance to have his/her last supper with the LTTE leader Prabhakaran, which was a rare honour, motivating LTTE cadres to join the Black Tiger wing.

== Assassinations ==
The LTTE has been condemned by various groups for assassinating political and military opponents. The LTTE assassinated several leading Tamil politicians such as Appapillai Amirthalingam, the former Leader of the Opposition; and the Sri Lankan government has accused the LTTE of assassinating Lakshman Kadirgamar, the former Foreign Minister whom the LTTE considered a "traitor". The assassination of the Sri Lankan president Ranasinghe Premadasa is attributed to LTTE. The seventh Prime Minister of the Republic of India, Rajiv Gandhi, was assassinated by an LTTE suicide bomber Thenmozhi Rajaratnam on 21 May 1991. On 24 October 1994, LTTE detonated a bomb during a political rally in Thotalanga-Grandpass, which killed most of the prominent politicians of the United National Party, including presidential candidate Gamini Dissanayake MP, Cabinet ministers Weerasinghe Mallimarachchi and G. M. Premachandra, Ossie Abeygunasekara MP and Gamini Wijesekara MP. In total, the Sri Lankan Ministry of Defence has accused the LTTE of assassinating 106 political figures.

Specifically in relation to the TELO, the LTTE has said that it had to perform preemptive self-defence because the TELO was in effect functioning as a proxy for India.

== Human rights violations ==
Numerous countries and international organizations have accused the LTTE of attacking civilians and recruiting children.

=== Attacks on civilians ===
The LTTE carried out several attacks on civilian targets. The first notable attack to take place outside of its claimed territory was the Anuradhapura massacre in 1985 which the LTTE stated was in retaliation to the Valvettiturai massacre of Tamil civilians. Other notable attacks include the Aranthalawa massacre, Kattankudy mosque massacre, the Kebithigollewa massacre, and the Dehiwala train bombing. Civilians have also been killed in attacks on economic targets, such as the Central Bank bombing. According to Udalagama and de Silva, between 3,700 and 4,100 civilians were killed in "terrorist acts" attributed to the LTTE, a "somewhat modest" proportion of the overall civilian death toll during the war.

The LTTE leader Prabhakaran denied allegations of killing innocent Sinhalese civilians, claiming to condemn such acts of violence. In the case of Sinhalese in colonized areas, he claimed that LTTE had instead attacked armed Home Guards who were "death-squads let loose on Tamil civilians" and Sinhalese settlers who were "brought to the Tamil areas to forcibly occupy the land." The continuous inflow of Sinhalese settlers into Tamil areas since the 1950s, encouraged by the government to undermine claims of a Tamil homeland, had become a source of inter-ethnic violence and had been one of the major grievances expressed by the LTTE. The LTTE also denied massacring Muslims, stating that they were allies against the Sinhalese state. LTTE sympathizers often claim that Karuna, while he was a commander, was solely responsible for many attacks, especially in the Eastern Province.

=== Child soldiers ===
The LTTE has been accused of recruiting and using child soldiers to fight against Sri Lankan government forces. The LTTE was accused of having up to 5,794 child soldiers in its ranks since 2001. Amid international pressure, the LTTE announced in July 2003 that it would stop conscripting child soldiers, but UNICEF and Human Rights Watch have accused it of reneging on its promises, and of conscripting Tamil children orphaned by the tsunami. N. Malathy, the former secretary of NESOHR, accused the UNICEF of sensationalizing this issue to fundraise and falsely listing disabled and orphaned children in the LTTE orphanages as child soldiers. On 18 June 2007, the LTTE released 135 children under 18 years of age. UNICEF, along with the United States, stated that there had been a significant drop in LTTE recruitment of children, but claimed in 2007 that 506 child recruits remain under the LTTE. A report released by the LTTE's Child Protection Authority (CPA) in 2008 stated that less than 40 soldiers under age 18 remained in its forces. In 2009 a Special Representative of the Secretary-General of the United Nations said the Tamil Tigers "continue to recruit children to fight on the frontlines", and "use force to keep many civilians, including children, in harm's way". During the violent parts of the war, though some children were forcefully recruited, many voluntarily joined the LTTE after witnessing or experiencing abuses by Sri Lankan security forces, seeking to "protect their families or to avenge real or perceived abuses." However, the Sri Lankan government's National Child Protection Authority alleged that since the ceasefire children were more likely to be forcibly recruited. The LTTE argued that instances of child recruitment occurred mostly in the eastern province, under the purview of former LTTE regional commander Colonel Karuna. After leaving the LTTE and forming the TMVP, it is alleged that Karuna continued to forcibly kidnap and induct child soldiers. Soon after Karuna's defection, the LTTE began an intensive campaign to re-recruit Karuna's former cadres, including child soldiers. Many of the former child soldiers were re-recruited by the LTTE, often by force.

=== Forced displacement ===
LTTE attacks led to the displacement of Sinhalese throughout the war, particularly in the Trincomalee District, where security forces and Sinhalese mobs previously expelled and massacred Tamils in 1985. Notably, in October 1987, the LTTE took advantage of communal violence in Trincomalee District, and carried out a series of attacks on Sinhalese settlements and townspeople throughout the Eastern Province. This led to the displacement of 20,000 Sinhalese and the deaths of 200.

Sri Lankan Moors (or Muslims) were also evicted in the north in 1990, and the east in 1992. Yogi, the LTTE's political spokesman, stated that this expulsion was carried out in retaliation for the atrocities committed against Tamils in the Eastern Province by Muslims, who were seen by the LTTE as collaborators with the Sri Lankan Army. Sri Lankan Defence Ministry, Human Rights Watch, among others, have described the forcible removal of Sinhalese and Muslim inhabitants from areas under its control as "ethnic cleansing".

During the peace talks in 2002, the LTTE formally apologised to the Muslims for the expulsion and invited them back, stating that the north-east also belonged to them. In 2003, the LTTE formally recognised the rights of the Muslim and Sinhalese communities to be present in the north-east in their ISGA proposals.

=== Mistreatment of prisoners ===
==== Executions ====
The LTTE executed prisoners of war on a number of occasions despite its declaration in 1988 that it would abide by the Geneva Conventions. One such incident was the mass murder of 600 unarmed Sri Lankan Police officers in 1990, in Eastern Province, after they surrendered to the LTTE on the request of President Ranasinghe Premadasa. In 1993, LTTE killed 200 Sri Lanka Army soldiers, captured in the naval base at Pooneryn, during the Battle of Pooneryn. Few months earlier they had executed an officer and several soldiers captured during the Battle of Janakapura. In 1996, LTTE executed 207 military officers and soldiers who had surrendered to the LTTE during Battle of Mullaitivu (1996). The LTTE was also accused of executing political prisoners it held in secret detention, including members of rival Tamil militant groups and individuals accused of betraying the LTTE.

==== Torture ====
The LTTE tortured suspects based on the victim's refusal to co-operate and for giving information to the Sri Lankan army or IPKF. Torture was also practised on child soldiers who attempted to flee military service such as by being left out in the sun. Sri Lankan soldiers and police officers taken as prisoners were also tortured by the LTTE during interrogations. LTTE prison conditions were often poor and many prisoners died due to infections from their wounds. Among the methods of torture included burning with heated metal, hanging the victim upside down and beating them, slashing with razors and electroshocking.

=== War crimes during the final stages of the Sri Lankan civil war ===
There are allegations that war crimes were committed by the Sri Lankan military and the LTTE during the last stages of the Sri Lankan civil war. The alleged war crimes include attacks on civilians and civilian buildings by both sides, executions of combatants and prisoners by both sides, keeping civilians as hostages by the LTTE, and recruitment of child soldiers by both the LTTE, and the TMVP, a Sri Lankan Army paramilitary group.

A panel of experts appointed by UN Secretary-General (UNSG) Ban Ki-moon to advise him on the issue of accountability with regard to any alleged violations of international human rights and humanitarian law during the final stages of the civil war found "credible allegations" which, if proven, indicated that war crimes and crimes against humanity were committed by the Sri Lankan military and the LTTE. The panel has called on the UNSG to conduct an independent international inquiry into the alleged violations of international law.

== See also ==
- 2009 Tamil diaspora protests
- Black July
- Eelam War
- List of assassinations of the Sri Lankan Civil War
- List of attacks attributed to the LTTE
- List of attacks on civilians attributed to Sri Lankan government forces
- Militant use of children in Sri Lanka
- Sri Lankan Tamil militant groups
- Sri Lankan Tamil nationalism
- Transnational Government of Tamil Eelam
