= Thangadurai (Tamil militant) =

Sri Lankan Tamil rebel

- தங்கத்துரை
- Born: N. Thangavelu
- Died: 25 July 1983; Colombo, Sri Lanka
- Years active: –1983
- Organization: Tamil Eelam Liberation Organization

Nadarajah Thangavelu (Tamil: நடராசா தங்கவேல்; died 25 July 1983; commonly known by the nom-de-guerre Thangadurai) was a Sri Lankan Tamil rebel and one of the founders of the Tamil Eelam Liberation Organization, a separatist Tamil militant organisation in Sri Lanka.

== Early militancy ==
In 1969 a small group of militant Tamil youths from Valvettithurai formed an underground group. The group was known as the Thangadurai Group and was led by Thangadurai and Kuttimani. The group would later be known as the Tamil Liberation Organisation (TLO). Other members of the group included V. Prabhakaran, Sri Sabaratnam, Pon Sivakumaran, Periya Sothi, Chinna Sothi, Chetti and Kannadi.

The group would hold secret meetings at a professor's house in Point Pedro, collect weapons and build crude bombs. The group carried out various arson attacks and attempted assassinations and formed close ties with Tamil Nadu politicians and the Research and Analysis Wing, the Indian intelligence agency. In April 1971 Thangadurai and 15 others were making explosives at a school in Thondamanar when a bomb exploded, seriously injuring Chinna Sothi. The following year Thangadurai, Prabhakaran, Chinna Sothi and Vythilingam Nadesathasan (Nadesudasan) were burnt in a similar explosion. In March 1977 Thangadurai and Jegan shot dead police informant Thadi Thangarajah at his house in Kokuvil.

At a meeting in a Hindu temple in Thondamanaru in September 1977 Thangadurai formally established the organisation as the Tamil Eelam Liberation Organization (TELO), together with its military wing Tamil Eelam Liberation Army (TELA).

As the violence increased the Sri Lankan government declared a state of emergency in the Jaffna Peninsula in late 1979 and sent in more troops. Thangadurai, Kuttimani, Prabhakaran and others fled to Tamil Nadu.

== Neervely bank robbery ==
On 25 March 1981 a People's Bank van returning to Jaffna after collecting cash in Vadamarachchi was robbed of Rs. 8 million on the Jaffna-Point Pedro Road in Neervely by a group of TELO including Thangadurai and Kuttimani. Thangadurai, Kuttimani and Selvadurai Sivasubramaniam (alias Devan) were arrested in Mannalkadal on 8 April 1981 as they tried to escape to India by boat. Thangadurai, Kuttimani, Devan, Navaratnarah (Nadarajah) Sivapatham (alias Sivapalan Master) and Nadesudasan were charged in connection with robbery. Sabaratnam was charged in absentia. The trial at Colombo High Court commenced on 2 November 1982 and on 24 February 1983 all six defendants were found guilty and sentenced to life in prison.

== Death ==
Thangadurai, Kuttimani, Devan, Sivapatham and Nadesudasan were kept at Welikada Prison whilst their appeal was waiting to be heard by the Supreme Court. On the night of 24 July 1983 an anti-Tamil riot started in Colombo. The following day the riot spread to Welikada Prison, Sinhalese prisoners attacked Tamil prisoners using knives and clubs, killing 39. Amongst the victims were Thangadurai and Kuttimani. Survivors reported that the pair were forced to kneel whilst their eyes were gouged out with iron bars (an allusion to Kutimani's statement in court) and that one of the attackers cut out Kutimani's tongue and drank his blood, crying "I have drunk the blood of a Tiger". Survivors also claimed that the prison officers allowed their keys to fall into the hand of the Sinhalese prisoners.
