= Selvarajah Yogachandran =

Sri Lankan militant

- Died: 25 July 1983; Welikada Prison, Colombo, Sri Lanka
- Occupation: Founding member of Tamil Eelam Liberation Organization
- Known for: Sri Lankan Tamil nationalism

Selvarajah Yogachandran, (Tamil: செல்வராஜா யோகசந்திரன்; died 25 July 1983) also known as Kuttimani, was a Sri Lankan militant who was one of the leaders of the Tamil militant organization TELO. He was arrested and sentenced to death, and was killed in the 1983 Welikada prison massacre along with the other TELO leader Nadarajah Thangathurai.

== Early activism and TELO ==
Selvarajah Yogachandran along with Nadarajah Thangathurai inspired several Tamil student radicals to rise against Sri Lankan state terror and founded the Tamil Eelam Liberation Organization in the late 1960s. The group formally constituted itself into an organisation in 1979, inspired in part by the LTTE and the Eelam Revolutionary Organisation of Students (EROS). Soon, it had become the most effective of the Tamil militant groups except the LTTE.

Kuttimani was a firm believer that only a free, independent country for the island's Tamils in their traditional homeland will protect their legitimate rights.

Kuttimani, Nadarajah and many others would later be arrested in 1981, in a brutal and intensive government crackdown of most of the Tamil liberation groups and activists.

== Nomination to the parliament ==
Before his death, Kuttimani was officially nominated to the Vaddukoddai constituency in 15 October 1982, when the then sitting member of TULF party, T.Thirunavukkarau died on 1 August 1982. However the legal sources, then under the control of President J. R. Jayewardene, ruled that Kuttimani's nomination as a member of parliament was invalid. The then Prisons Commissioner Priya Delgoda announced on 16 October 1982 that Kuttimani would not be released from prison to take his oaths at the parliament. Kuttimani's appointment was gazetted while he was under a sentence of death. In a statement issued to explain the reasons for nominating Kuttimani to the vacant parliamentary seat, the TULF officials included five. Among these are two prominent reasons: (1) Kuttimani's nomination is a token protest against the state terrorism perpetrated from time to time through the agencies of the police and military personnel especially on the young Tamils of the country. (2) It is a protest against the death penalty imposed on Kuttimani and Jegan. Subsequently, on 4 February 1983, Kuttimani's death sentence was commuted to life imprisonment under the general amnesty proclaimed by President Jayewardene. After this, Kuttimani resigned his Vaddukoddai seat in the parliament, to which he was nominated.

== Imprisonment, death and martyrdom ==
=== Death sentence ===
Kuttimani was arrested by the Sri Lankan Navy on 5 April 1981 and was charged with an array of "criminal acts". The Sri Lankan court sentenced him to death.

The presiding judge said that when he sat down he would pronounce his verdict as required by law. However, before that, he wanted to state that he did not view Kuttimani as a common criminal. He further said that if one day the president was to grant a reprieve to Kuttimani he would be happy to hear of it. Kuttimani's reply showed the world his yearning for a free country (Tamil Eelam) for his people. This was his reply:

Before my death sentence is carried out, please remove my eyes and transplant them to a Tamil without eyesight. I will not be able to see the free Tamil Eelam but, at least, let my eyes see it.

Upon his death sentence, Kuttimani was sent to the Welikada (Welikade) maximum-security prison to wait for his execution. There were both Sinhala and Tamil prisoners. The Sinhala prisoners were convicted of criminal offences such as murder, rape, robbery, etc. The Tamil prisoners were all militants. The Sinhala and Tamil prisoners were kept apart all the time to avoid racial clashes between them.

=== Murder ===
Kuttimani was brutally murdered during the 1983 Anti-Tamil pogrom in the island. Sinhalese mobs as well as personnel belonging to the Sri Lankan forces went on a rampage in Tamil areas, torturing and murdering Tamil men and children, raping, torturing and murdering Tamil women and girls, and looting and burning Tamil residences and businesses. Police and army (which were almost exclusively Sinhalese) either participated in this orgy of violence against the Tamils or kept a blind eye.

On 25 July, the second day of the pogrom, the Tamil inmates of the Welikada prison, who almost all of them had been detained without any trial, were brutally murdered by the Sinhalese convicts with the assistance of the prison guards. According to Amnesty International, some of the Sinhala prisoners were given alcohol and then were encouraged to attack the Tamil prisoners. A large number of the Sinhala prisoners, with knives and other sharp weapons, stormed into the building where some 35-37 Tamil prisoners were lodged. They stabbed, beat and tortured the Tamil prisoners. Genitals of a few prisoners were mutilated.

Both the eyes of Kuttimani as well as Jeganathan were mutilated and gouged out with iron bars, since he had dreamed of seeing with them, through another person after his execution, an independent Tamil state. One version has it that Kutimani's tongue was cut out by an attacker who drank the blood and cried: "I have drunk the blood of a Tiger." He was then murdered and his body was disposed in front of a statue of the Buddha in the prison yard.

== See also ==
- Nadarajah Thangathurai
- Velupillai Prabhakaran
- Sivakumaran
- Jeganathan
- Rajasundaram
- S. J. V. Chelvanayakam
- Black July
