= Bank of Tamil Eelam =

- Native name: தமிழீழ வைப்பகம்
- Company type: Public
- Industry: Banking, Financial services
- Founded: 1994
- Defunct: January 2, 2009
- Fate: Suspended
- Headquarters: Jaffna
- Owner: LTTE
- Number of employees: 100 employees

The Bank of Tamil Eelam was founded in Jaffna in 1994 by the Sri Lankan separatist organization LTTE, but was relocated in 1995, to Kilinochchi after the Sri Lankan army retook the peninsula. The Bank of Tamil Eelam had six branch offices and employed around 100 employees. The Bank of Tamil Eelam was suspended on January 2, 2009, following the capture of Kilinochchi, which had been the administrative capital of self-proclaimed Tamil Eelam.
