= Neervely =

- Country: Sri Lanka
- Province: Northern
- District: Jaffna
- DS Division: Valikamam East
- Area Government Office: Kopay
- Named for: water around

Population (2011 est.)
  - Total: 50,000
- Time zone: 0530

Neervely is a village located in Jaffna, Sri Lanka. It is located 8 km from Jaffna along the Point Pedro road.

Neerveli is located in the Northern Province of Sri Lanka in the Valigamam East Region on point pedro Road next to Koppai North. Surrounded by water on all four sides. Contains water sources and fields. It is an agricultural village and famous for its banana plantation. It is rich in limestone. Nilavari well is located 4 km north of Neerveli. When Rama came to Sri Lanka water flowed to pierce Ambal's land. Rama and Anumar's entourage drank water from it. It is 180 feet tall. In course of time it became a big well. It also has many tourist centers like Pokkani. This is history evidence from "history of neervely "

.

== Education in Neervely ==
- Attiar Hindu College, Neervely was established in 1929.
- Hindu Tamil mixed school, Neervely South.
- Ramupillai vithyalayam, Neervely West.
- Four other schools

== Places of Worship ==
- Neervely Kanthaswami Temple
- Neervely Arasakesari Pillaiyar Temple
- Neervely Vaikaal Tharavai Pillaiyar Temple

== Agriculture ==
Especially Banana, paddy and other vegetables etc.

Neervely has Sri Lanka's leading big banana market too.

== Industries ==
Building construction, wood and metal works

== Bank robbery ==
On March 25, 1981, militants of the Liberation Tigers of Tamil Eelam and Tamil Eelam Liberation Organization robbed a bank van of Rs. 8. 1 million rupees near Neervely. This was the last joint operation between LTTE and TELO.
