= Welikada prison massacre =

Mass killing in Colombo, Sri Lanka during the 1983 Black July riots

The Welikada Prison Massacre took place during the 1983 Black July pogrom against Sri Lankan Tamil minority in Colombo, Sri Lanka. Fifty-three prisoners were killed inside a high-security prison. No one has been convicted of crimes relating to these incidents.

== Incident ==
The incident occurred in two different series of actions: the first on 25 July 1983 when 39 Tamil prisoners were attacked and killed by Sinhalese inmates. The second massacre was two days later when Sinhalese inmates killed another 18 Tamil detainees and 3 prison deputies. The Sinhala prisoners were assisted by prison authorities in killing the Tamil inmates, with reports of cell doors being left open on purpose.

== See also ==
- Bindunuwewa prison massacre
- Kalutara prison massacre
