= Neelan: Unsilenced =

- Directed by: Pitasanna Shanmugathas
- Written by: Pitasanna Shanmugathas
- Produced by: Pitasanna Shanmugathas
- Starring: Neelan Tiruchelvam; G. L. Peiris; Rohan Edrisinha; Henry Steiner; Erik Solheim
- Narrated by: Pitasanna Shanmugathas
- Production company: Unsilencing Films
- Release date: July 29, 2025
- Running time: 140 minutes
- Countries: Canada; Sri Lanka
- Languages: English; Tamil; Sinhala

Neelan: Unsilenced (stylized as NEELAN: UNSILENCED) is a 2025 documentary film directed, written, produced and narrated by Canadian filmmaker Pitasanna Shanmugathas. The film examines the life and 1999 assassination of Neelan Tiruchelvam, a Sri Lankan Tamil constitutional lawyer, academic and parliamentarian who was killed by the Liberation Tigers of Tamil Eelam (LTTE) after championing a negotiated, power-sharing constitutional settlement of Sri Lanka's ethnic conflict.

The film was released for free online viewing on 29 July 2025, the twenty-sixth anniversary of Tiruchelvam's assassination. It combines archival footage with interviews with academics, politicians, journalists, family members and colleagues of Tiruchelvam.

Tiruchelvam was killed on 29 July 1999 when a suicide bomber detonated explosives beside his vehicle near the Kynsey Road and Rosmead Place junction in Colombo as he travelled to his office. The following day, Human Rights Watch described Tiruchelvam as "one of Sri Lanka's leading human rights advocates", condemned his murder as a deplorable violation of humanitarian law and called on the Sri Lankan government to investigate immediately.

== Synopsis ==
The film opens with footage from the final stages of the Sri Lankan Civil War in 2009 and asks whether the war's end might have been different had Tiruchelvam's pluralist proposals been adopted a decade earlier. It traces his life from his upbringing in a politically active family, including the career of his father, M. Tiruchelvam, a Federal Party leader, through his legal education at the University of Colombo and Harvard Law School and his entry into politics with the Tamil United Liberation Front (TULF). Tiruchelvam entered politics through the TULF in part because his father was himself a leading Tamil politician. The film uses footage of the 1981 burning of the Jaffna Public Library and the 1983 Black July riots, and covers Tiruchelvam's founding of the International Centre for Ethnic Studies and the Law and Society Trust.

The film gives particular attention to Tiruchelvam's central role in formulating President Chandrika Kumaratunga's August 1995 constitutional reform proposals, which would have replaced Sri Lanka's "unitary state" with a "Union of Regions". The proposals devolved authority over land, policing and education to the regions. The film shows how the proposals were withdrawn in the face of opposition from the United National Party led by Ranil Wickremesinghe and from Sinhala nationalists, and how the LTTE's silence undermined Kumaratunga's efforts to build cross-ethnic support. It includes archival footage of Foreign Minister Lakshman Kadirgamar criticizing that silence, and an interview in which Norwegian peace facilitator Erik Solheim argues that the government's error lay more in the process than in the content of the proposals. The LTTE branded Tiruchelvam a "traitor" as the proposals' chief architect.

The film also covers Tiruchelvam's international work, including his role alongside law professor Steve Kanter as a consultant on Kazakhstan's post-Soviet constitution, and his work with the National Democratic Institute, including as an observer of Chile's 1988 plebiscite. It closes with Tiruchelvam's assassination and an elegy by poet Indran Amirthanayagam.

== Background and production ==
In an interview with JURIST, Shanmugathas said his research into Tiruchelvam's life began after reading the work of Sri Lankan Tamil journalist D. B. S. Jeyaraj, and that he was further motivated by Helene Klodawsky's documentary No More Tears Sister about Rajani Thiranagama, who was also assassinated by the LTTE. He said production spanned approximately nine years. Shanmugathas had previously co-directed the six-part documentary series Truth to the Powerless: An Investigation into Canada's Foreign Policy.

Shanmugathas has said the release was timed to coincide with renewed debate over constitutional reform following the election of President Anura Kumara Dissanayake and his National People's Power coalition, which campaigned on a new constitution that would abolish the executive presidency. Reviewers also noted the film's relevance to the NPP government's parliamentary supermajority.

=== Historical context ===
Tiruchelvam and G. L. Peiris were co-architects of the 1995 "Union of Regions" devolution package, which pro-LTTE sections of the Tamil polity opposed, denouncing Tiruchelvam as a traitor. A diluted version of the package formed the basis of Kumaratunga's draft constitution bill, presented to Parliament in August 2000 and defeated by the opposition UNP. Writing on the thirteenth anniversary of Tiruchelvam's death, constitutional scholar Asanga Welikala argued that his absence was felt most acutely in relation to Tamil nationalism, which he wrote was in "a state of ideological disarray and strategic confusion" following the war. Vasuki Nesiah, who appears in the film, worked as Tiruchelvam's research assistant in the summer of 1999, preparing courses he was to teach at Harvard Law School that autumn. In the 14th Neelan Tiruchelvam Memorial Lecture, delivered in Colombo on 28 July 2013, she said that the Tamil epics Silappatikaram and Manimekalai, which Tiruchelvam valued for their pluralism, stood "like Neelan himself" in "contradistinction to insular and illiberal expressions of Tamil nationalism".

== Cast ==
The film features interviews with, and archival footage of, the following individuals, appearing as themselves:

- Neelan Tiruchelvam (archive footage)
- G. L. Peiris, former Sri Lankan Minister of Justice and Constitutional Affairs
- Vasudevan Tiruchelvam, surgeon and Neelan Tiruchelvam's brother
- Mithran Tiruchelvam, lawyer and Neelan Tiruchelvam's son
- Rohan Edrisinha, constitutional affairs expert, Centre for Policy Alternatives
- Henry Steiner, professor emeritus, Harvard Law School
- Rajavarothiam Sampanthan, former Leader of the Opposition
- Veerasingham Anandasangaree, leader, Tamil United Liberation Front
- M. A. Sumanthiran, politician, Tamil National Alliance
- Paikiasothy Saravanamuttu, executive director, Centre for Policy Alternatives
- Devanesan Nesiah, former civil servant
- Vasuki Nesiah, professor, NYU Gallatin
- Sharika Thiranagama, professor of anthropology, Stanford University
- M. K. Eelaventhan, Sri Lankan Tamil political figure
- Ignacius Lokanathan, journalist
- Erik Solheim, Norwegian peace facilitator
- Steve Kanter, emeritus dean and professor of law, Lewis & Clark Law School
- Larry Garber, international election monitoring consultant
- Ken Wollack, former chairman, National Endowment for Democracy
- Mario Gomez, executive director, International Centre for Ethnic Studies
- Indran Amirthanayagam, poet and essayist
- Arum Kandiah, agricultural expert and university roommate of Neelan Tiruchelvam
- Roberto Unger, professor, Harvard Law School
- David Collenette, former Canadian Minister of National Defence
- Chandrika Kumaratunga (archive footage)
- Velupillai Prabhakaran (archive footage)
- Anton Balasingham (archive footage)
- Rajan Hoole (archive footage)
- Dayan Jayatilleka (archive footage)
- Lakshman Kadirgamar (archive footage)
- Harry Miller (archive footage)
- Kumar Ponnambalam (archive footage)
- C. V. K. Sivagnanam, former municipal commissioner (archive footage)
- Pitasanna Shanmugathas, narrator (voice)

== Reception ==
Neelan: Unsilenced received largely favourable reviews. Writing in the Daily FT, Mark Salter described the film as an "absorbing and well-conceived documentary" that brings together a wide range of Tamil and Sinhala voices, and judged its treatment of the 1995 proposals its strongest section. Salter considered the film too long at nearly two and a half hours. Other viewers acknowledged its length but defended the pacing as necessary given the historical context the film covers, with one writing that no part of it could be left out. Several also highlighted its interviews with Tiruchelvam's family members as giving the documentary an emotional dimension beyond its constitutional and political content.

Writing in Groundviews, Kagusthan Ariaratnam considered the film's greatest achievement to be its focus on the non-violent, intellectual and pluralistic dimensions of Tamil resistance, which he wrote are often eclipsed by the narrative of armed struggle.

Chinniah Rajeshkumar, writing in the Jaffna Monitor, criticized the film for omitting the contributions of Tiruchelvam's wife, human rights lawyer Sithie Tiruchelvam.

The Sunday Times reported that the documentary "shed new light" on the assassination through Solheim's account that Balasingham had told him Tiruchelvam was killed because the LTTE viewed him as a tool of the government, and that the LTTE had warned Tiruchelvam to leave the country before his death.

Overall, it provides a fitting, well-presented tribute to one of the most honourable, important, if often neglected figures in modern Sri Lankan history.

— Mark Salter, Author of To End a Civil War: Norway's Peace Engagement in Sri Lanka, Daily FT

Unsilenced reminds us that Neelan was more than a constitutional scholar. He was a champion of both individual and collective rights, a believer in pluralism at a time of polarisation, and above all, a reminder of paths not taken—but still within reach.

— Chinniah Rajeshkumar, Co-founder of the LTTE, Jaffna Monitor

NEELAN: UNSILENCED is a thought provoking and educational tribute to a Tamil intellectual who sacrificed his life in the pursuit of a more just and inclusive Sri Lanka.

— Kagusthan Ariaratnam, Former LTTE child soldier, Groundviews

Ultimately what this documentary serves, is to educate and inform generations of Sri Lankans, irrespective of their ethnicity, of the existence of such honorable men who chose peaceful means to address issues facing the Tamil community.

— Natasha Fernando, PhD candidate, South Asia Democratic Forum

NEELAN: UNSILENCED bridges history, politics, and moral courage.

— Theepika Loganathan and Pirinda Perazhakan, Public Policy & Global Affairs Review, Munk School of Global Affairs and Public Policy, University of Toronto

Through meticulous storytelling, NEELAN: UNSILENCED not only revives Dr. Tiruchelvam's legacy but also challenges contemporary Sri Lanka—and the world—to confront the urgent need for inclusive governance.

— Arnav Laroia, South Asia Chief of Staff, JURIST

NEELAN UNSILENCED is an engrossing documentary about an iconic Sri Lankan intellectual whose life was extinguished at his prime... A must-watch film for all those who care about the future of Sri Lanka.

— Mario Gomez, Executive Director, International Centre for Ethnic Studies

Neelan: Unsilenced is a vital chronicle of a legal mind who dared to reimagine Sri Lanka as a pluralistic, decentralised state... Tiruchelvam's advocacy for devolution, judicial review, and minority protections remains a beacon.

— James Joseph, Global Human Rights Consultant, The Jaffna Post

With Sri Lanka's current administration elected on promises of deep reform and a rare parliamentary supermajority to attempt it, Neelan: Unsilenced lands as both a memorial and a provocation.

— Aritra Banerjee, Editor, Eurasia Review

No doubt the educational documentary will inspire the Sri Lankan public, as well as those everywhere who care deeply about the country, to imagine the inclusive, power-sharing constitution Dr. Tiruchelvam envisioned.

— Helene Klodawsky, Director of No More Tears Sister

A tribute to a man of peace and vision. Neelan worked tirelessly to find constitutional solutions which could unite and avoid war. The film is a wonderful introduction to the constitutional issues at the core of the Sri Lankan conflict.

— Erik Solheim, Norwegian peace facilitator during the Sri Lankan civil war

Neelan Unsilenced teaches a tragic lesson of the dangers of violence and separatism, which is also a hopeful lesson of the potential of democracy, federalism, and compromise. I hope it is viewed by everyone in Sri Lanka, and everyone on Earth.

— David Swanson, Executive Director, World Beyond War

In the same LinkedIn post, Solheim, who appears in the documentary, recalled that LTTE ideologue Anton Balasingham had later remarked that Tiruchelvam's constitutional proposals were "the best which had been offered" among attempts to resolve the conflict.

== Themes ==
The documentary examines how the LTTE's "traitor" discourse was used to justify the killing of Tamil moderates who pursued negotiated solutions, including Tiruchelvam and former TULF leader Appapillai Amirthalingam, through commentary from Sharika Thiranagama, M. A. Sumanthiran and a journalist who recalls the vilification of Tiruchelvam in Tamil media. Amirthalingam, a former Leader of the Opposition whom the LTTE called a "thurogi" (traitor) for seeking a negotiated settlement within a united Sri Lanka, was shot dead in Colombo on 13 July 1989 along with former TULF MP Vettivelu Yogeswaran. Sumanthiran has himself been denounced as a traitor by Tamil nationalist elements, and in October 2016 told a public meeting in Vavuniya that Amirthalingam and Tiruchelvam had both been called traitors and killed. It also includes pro-LTTE figure M. K. Eelaventhan portraying Tiruchelvam as a collaborator.

The film also addresses Sinhala resistance to federalism. Rohan Edrisinha explains that the Sinhala-language conflation of the terms for "unitary" and "united" contributed to public opposition to the 1995 proposals' replacement of the "unitary state" clause with a "Union of Regions".

== Release ==
The documentary was released for free viewing on its official website on 29 July 2025, the 26th death anniversary of Neelan Tiruchelvam. Shanmugathas has said he made it freely accessible to reach the widest possible audience and as a call to action directed at the Dissanayake government. The film was screened at the International Centre for Ethnic Studies auditorium in Kandy on 26 March 2026. On 13 November 2026, the Collective for Historical Dialogue and Memory and the Law Students' Union of Sri Lanka organised a screening of the documentary at Sri Lanka Law College in Colombo, followed by a discussion with M. A. Sumanthiran.
