= Velupillai Prabhakaran =

Eelam Tamil nationalist and military leader (1954–2009)

- வேலுப்பிள்ளை பிரபாகரன்
- Born: 26 November 1954; Valvettithurai, Dominion of Ceylon
- Died: 18 May 2009 (aged 54); Mullaitivu, Sri Lanka
- Cause of death: Killed in action
- Other names: Karikalan: Nicknames: Thalaivar, Anna, Thambiyanna, Thamizh Thesiya Thalaivar
- Occupations: Founder & leader of the Tamil New Tigers in 1972 and Liberation Tigers of Tamil Eelam.
- Known for: Tamil nationalism, National Leader of Tamil Eelam, Military Tactics.
- Title: Prime Minister and President of Tamil Eelam
- Term: 1984 – 18 May 2009
- Criminal charges: Planning assassination of Rajiv Gandhi in 1991; Colombo Central Bank bombing of 1996
- Criminal penalty: Arrest warrant issued by Colombo High Court; Death warrant issued by Madras High Court, India. Sentenced to 200 years imprisonment by Colombo High Court.
- Spouse: Mathivathani Erambu (1984–2009)
- Children: Charles Anthony (1984–2009); Duvaraga (1985–2009); Balachandran (1997–2009)

Signature
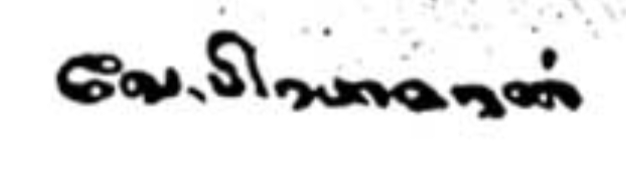

Velupillai Prabhakaran (Note: ; Tamil: வேலுப்பிள்ளை பிரபாகரன்; [ˈʋeːlɯpːiɭːaɪ pɾaˈbaːhaɾan]) (26 November 1954 – 18 May 2009) was an Eelam Tamil nationalist, revolutionary and guerrilla leader. A major figure of Tamil nationalism, he founded and led the Liberation Tigers of Tamil Eelam (LTTE). The LTTE was a militant organization that sought to create an independent Tamil state in the north and east of Sri Lanka in reaction to the oppression of the country's Tamil population by the Sri Lankan government. Under his direction, the LTTE undertook a military campaign against the Sri Lankan government for more than 25 years.

Prabhakaran was the youngest of four children, born in Valvettithurai, on Sri Lanka's Jaffna peninsula's northern coast. Considered the heart of Tamil culture and literature in Sri Lanka, Jaffna was concentrated with growing Tamil nationalism, which called for autonomy for Tamils to protest the discrimination against them by the Sinhalese-dominated Sri Lankan state and Sinhalese civilians since the country's independence from the United Kingdom in 1948.

Founded in 1976, after the 1974 Tamil conference killings by Sri Lankan government police, the LTTE came to prominence in 1983 after it ambushed a patrol of the Sri Lanka Army outside Jaffna, resulting in the deaths of 13 soldiers. This ambush, along with the subsequent pogrom that resulted in the deaths of thousands of Tamil civilians, is generally considered the start of the Sri Lankan Civil War. After decades of fighting, including the intervention of the Indian Army (IPKF), the conflict was halted after international mediation in 2001 following the LTTE's tactical victory in Eelam War III. By then, the LTTE, which came to be known as the Tamil Tigers, controlled large swathes of land in the north and east of the country, running a de facto state with Prabhakaran as its leader. Peace talks eventually broke down, and the Sri Lanka Army launched a military campaign to defeat the LTTE in 2006.

Prabhakaran, who had said, "I would prefer to die in honour rather than being caught alive by the enemy", was killed in a firefight with the Sri Lankan Army in May 2009. Prabhakaran's reported death and the subsequent ceasefire announcement by Selvarasa Pathmanathan, the Tigers' chief of international relations, brought an end to the armed conflict.

A significant figure of Sri Lankan Tamil nationalism, Prabhakaran is often seen as a martyr by Sri Lankan Tamils. However, he is acknowledged to have created one of the most ruthless and sophisticated insurgencies of the modern era, with many of the tactics he pioneered influencing political militant groups globally. Prabhakaran led the LTTE as its supreme leader and insisted that it was the sole representative of the Tamil people, treating dissent as treason. The LTTE banned rival Tamil parties and militant groups, killed many of their leaders and cadres, and targeted intellectuals who challenged it, such as the University of Jaffna anatomy professor and human rights activist Rajani Thiranagama, who was killed in 1989. Human rights monitors described its claims to power as totalitarian and its control over Tamil society as resting on terror and the silencing of civil society. Under his leadership the LTTE assassinated numerous democratic Tamil political leaders who opposed it and sought a negotiated settlement, including Tamil United Liberation Front (TULF) leader Appapillai Amirthalingam and former Jaffna MP Vettivelu Yogeswaran in 1989, Jaffna mayors Sarojini Yogeswaran and Pon Sivapalan in 1998, and constitutional lawyer and MP Neelan Tiruchelvam in 1999. The LTTE expelled the entire Muslim population of the Northern Province in 1990, in what has been widely described as ethnic cleansing, ordered the civilian population of Jaffna to leave the city in 1995, used violence to enforce a Tamil boycott of the 2005 presidential election, and forcibly recruited young people, including children. Prabhakaran himself argued that he chose military means only after observing that nonviolent means were ineffectual and obsolete, especially after the Tamil Eelam revolutionary Thileepan's fatal hunger strike in 1987 had no effect. Influenced by Indian nationalists Subhas Chandra Bose and Bhagat Singh, both of whom participated in the revolutionary movement for Indian independence, Prabhakaran declared that his goal was 'revolutionary socialism and the creation of an egalitarian society'.

== Early life ==
Velupillai Prabhakaran was born in the northern coastal town of Valvettithurai on 26 November 1954, the youngest of four children. His parents, Thiruvenkadam Velupillai and Vallipuram Parvathy, belonged to the Karaiyar community. Thiruvenkadam Velupillai was the District Land Officer in the Ceylon Government. He came from an influential and wealthy family who owned and managed the major Hindu temples in Valvettithurai.

Angered by the discrimination and violent persecution against Tamil people by successive Sri Lankan governments, Prabhakaran joined the student group Tamil Youth Front (TYF) during the standardisation debates. In 1972, he founded the Tamil New Tigers (TNT), a successor to many earlier organizations that protested against the post-colonial political direction of the country, in which the minority Sri Lankan Tamils were pitted against the majority Sinhalese people.

In 1975, after becoming heavily involved in the Tamil movement, he carried out the first major political assassination by a Tamil group, shooting Alfred Duraiappah, the mayor of Jaffna, at point-blank range in front of the Hindu temple at Ponnaalai. The assassination was in response to the killings of Tamils in the 1974 Tamil conference incident, for which Duraiappah was blamed due to having backed the then-ruling Sri Lanka Freedom Party. Chinniah Rajeshkumar (Ragavan), a co-founder of the LTTE, later wrote that he sheltered Prabhakaran at his grandmother's house in Punnalaikadduvan for almost a year after the killing. He described the assassination as widely seen as the start of the elimination of "traitors" in Tamil nationalist politics.

== Liberation Tigers of Tamil Eelam ==
=== Founding of the LTTE ===
In the early 1970s, the United Front government of Sirimavo Bandaranaike introduced the policy of standardisation which made the criteria for university admission lower for the Sinhalese than for the Tamils. Several organizations to counter this act were formed by Tamil students. Prabhakaran, aged 15, dropped out of school and became associated with the Kuttimani-Thangathurai group (which evolved later into TELO) formed by Selvarajah Yogachandran (known as Kuttimani) and Nadarajah Thangathurai who both also hailed from Valvettithurai.

Prabhakaran along with Kuttimani, Ponnuthurai Sivakumaran and other prominent rebels joined the Tamil Manavar Peravai formed by a student named Satiyaseelan in 1970. This group comprised Tamil youth who advocated the rights of students to have fair enrollment. (Note: The name is variously translated as Tamil Students League or Tamil Students Federation, later also known as Tamil Ilaynar Peravai (TIP), translated as Tamil Youth Front (TYF),) In 1973, Prabhakaran teamed up with Chetti Thanabalasingam and with a fraction of the Tamil Manavar Peravai to form the Tamil New Tigers (TNT). Their first notable attack was held at the Duraiappa stadium in Jaffna placing a bomb in an attempt to murder the Jaffna Mayor Alfred Duraiappah. A member of the Sri Lanka Freedom Party who was loyal to Sirimavo Bandaranaike, Duraiappah was seen as a traitor by the Tamil masses. Failing the attempt, Prabhakaran managed to shoot and kill Duraiappah who was on a visit at a Hindu temple at Ponnalai on 27 July 1975.

On 5 May 1976, the TNT was renamed the Liberation Tigers of Tamil Eelam (LTTE), commonly known as the Tamil Tigers.

=== Eelam War I ===
By the early 1980s, the LTTE carried out more attacks against police and military forces. On 23 July 1983, Prabhakaran led LTTE cadres in an ambush on an army patrol that killed 13 Sri Lankan soldiers in Thirunelveli, Sri Lanka. The response to this was the worst government sponsored anti-Tamil pogrom(the event known as Black July) resulting in the deaths of thousands of Tamil civilians, and destruction of Tamil homes and shops, leaving over 150,000 Tamils homeless. As a result, thousands of Tamil youth began joining the LTTE, which officially marked the beginning of Eelam War I. With Prabhakaran being the most wanted man in Sri Lanka, he had said in 1984, "I would prefer to die in honour rather than being caught alive by the enemy." Prabhakaran held his first speech on 4 August 1987 at the Suthumalai Amman temple in front of over 100,000 people explaining the position of the LTTE. This speech is seen as a historic turning point in the Sri Lankan Tamil nationalism. In the same year, Asiaweek compared Prabhakaran to revolutionary Che Guevara, while Newsweek called him "the stuff of legend".

=== Killings of Tamil political leaders ===
Under Prabhakaran's leadership the LTTE killed many Tamil politicians who rejected its claim to be the sole representative of the Tamil people. According to University Teachers for Human Rights (Jaffna) (UTHR(J)), the LTTE's decision to kill a person often turned on whether that person posed a long-term political threat to the organisation. Its usual practice was to carry out the killing, stay silent, and leave its supporters at home and abroad to discredit the victim and spread confusion about who was responsible.

==== Appapillai Amirthalingam and Vettivelu Yogeswaran ====
In 1989 the LTTE was holding talks with the government of President Ranasinghe Premadasa, with whom it shared an interest in the withdrawal of the Indian Peace Keeping Force. Appapillai Amirthalingam, the TULF leader and former Leader of the Opposition, argued in Parliament in June 1989 that the Indian army should remain until the Indo-Sri Lanka Accord was implemented. The LTTE had already branded him a traitor because, after leading the call for a separate Tamil state in 1976, he had turned to power sharing within a united Sri Lanka.

On 13 July 1989, three LTTE cadres, Rasiah Aravintharaja alias Visu, Peter Leon Aloysius alias Vigna and Sivakumar alias Arivu, came to the house on Bauddhaloka Mawatha (Bullers Road), Colombo, where Amirthalingam, former Jaffna MP Vettivelu Yogeswaran and other TULF leaders were staying. The meeting, ostensibly to discuss Tamil unity, had been arranged through Yogeswaran, who at the LTTE's request told the police guards not to search the visitors. At about 7:20 p.m. Visu drew a pistol and shot Amirthalingam, and Aloysius shot Yogeswaran. Former TULF president M. Sivasithamparam was wounded in the shoulder. Police officer Nissanka Thibbotumunuwa, who had earlier found a grenade and bullets on Arivu, killed all three gunmen. The LTTE officially disclaimed responsibility. UTHR(J) identified Visu as the LTTE's intelligence chief and wrote that, through the killings, the LTTE leader "completed the act of political parricide on which he had set his mind". It added that the decision to kill Amirthalingam had very likely been taken years earlier, and that it was justified on the ground that he had abandoned the separatist demand he had popularised.

==== Rajani Thiranagama ====
Rajani Thiranagama, a professor of anatomy at the University of Jaffna medical faculty, human rights activist and feminist, was shot dead in Jaffna on 21 September 1989 as she cycled home from the university. She was 35. She had once been close to the LTTE and had treated injured militants in its early years, but later left the movement and became a critic of narrow nationalism and irresponsible militarism, often clashing with Indian officials over human rights violations. Her husband, Dayapala Thiranagama, wrote that no dissent was tolerated at the time and that the gunmen shot her twice more in the back of the head after she fell. The LTTE never claimed responsibility, and people close to it tried to shift the blame elsewhere, but Jeyaraj wrote that it became clear the LTTE was responsible. Two of her students who belonged to its intelligence wing supplied the information on which an LTTE hit squad killed her. She had foreseen her death, writing that her killers would be "sons nurtured in the womb of Jaffna". At the time she was working on the manuscript of The Broken Palmyra, a book on the human cost of the war in Jaffna.

==== A. Thangathurai, Sarojini Yogeswaran and Pon Sivapalan ====
TULF Trincomalee MP A. Thangathurai was killed at a school function on 5 July 1997 along with six civilians. UTHR(J) reported that police investigations soon left no doubt that the LTTE was responsible.

Sarojini Yogeswaran, Vettivelu Yogeswaran's widow, had witnessed her husband's killing in 1989. She was elected mayor of Jaffna on 29 January 1998, promising to restore normal life and end armed violence in the city, and was shot dead at her home by two gunmen on 17 May 1998. Her successor, TULF legal secretary Pon Sivapalan, was killed on 11 September 1998 by a bomb in the ceremonial hall next to the Nallur Kandaswamy temple, together with Jaffna's town commandant Brigadier Susantha Mendis, senior police officers and municipal officials. At least 13 people died. UTHR(J) attributed both killings to the LTTE. Amnesty International stated in 1999 that the LTTE had killed two mayors of Jaffna in 1998.

==== Neelan Tiruchelvam ====
Neelan Tiruchelvam, a constitutional lawyer and TULF MP, co-authored with Minister G. L. Peiris the devolution proposals released by the government of President Chandrika Kumaratunga on 3 August 1995. The proposals would have replaced the unitary state with a "Union of Regions", each with an elected Regional Council holding "exclusive legislative and executive competence within the devolved sphere" over subjects including health, education, agriculture, industry, transport and local government. Regions would control state land and their own police, could tax and borrow, and would have their own High Courts, service commissions and a Governor appointed with the Chief Minister's concurrence. A permanent Commission on Devolution would settle disputes between the centre and the regions, the boundaries of the North-East Province were to be redrawn in consultation to reconcile Sinhala, Tamil and Muslim interests, and defence, foreign affairs and currency remained with the centre. Article 76 of the constitution, which barred Parliament from alienating its legislative power, would be deleted.

Tiruchelvam wrote that the provincial councils created under the Thirteenth Amendment in 1987 had been weakened by the entrenched unitary state, the centre's control of "national policy" on devolved subjects, and the provinces' financial dependence on the centre. He described the new proposals as "not marginal or modest changes" but a fundamental reconstruction of the distribution of powers, with most subjects on the former concurrent list transferred to the regions. Bertram Bastiampillai wrote that these changes had largely removed what had stymied devolution in the past.

The proposals posed a direct challenge to the LTTE. Lakshman Marasinghe wrote that they were meant to replace its claim to a separate state of Eelam. Sumanasiri Liyanage recorded that the TULF and other Tamil parties welcomed them, while the LTTE's Inside Report dismissed them as irrelevant and said that laying down arms for "intangible proposals" would be political suicide for the organisation. He cited Dr Muni of Jawaharlal Nehru University, who argued that the package was addressed to Tamils in LTTE-controlled areas as well as elsewhere, and that if widely welcomed it would erode the Tigers' social base and legitimacy. At a press conference in Jaffna on 11 August 1995, LTTE political adviser Anton Balasingham condemned the proposals as treachery against the Tamils, saying they rested on a "misconceived fantasy" that the LTTE and the Tamil people could be separated by a devolution package. Tiruchelvam was then denounced as a traitor in sections of the Tamil and English press.

On 29 July 1999, at about 9:15 a.m., a suicide bomber threw himself onto Tiruchelvam's car at the Kynsey Road and Rosmead Place junction in Colombo, killing him. Human Rights Watch said the LTTE was suspected and had been linked to the killings of several TULF members over the preceding decade, and Amnesty International said the use of a suicide bomber suggested an LTTE link. Writing ten years later, James Ross of Human Rights Watch stated that the bomber was a Tamil Tiger, and that Tiruchelvam's rejection of violence and of the LTTE's claim to be the "sole representative" of the Tamils undercut the Tigers' justification for their campaign. In a speech at Kilinochchi on 11 March 2003, Balasingham described Tiruchelvam's 1995 draft as correct and acceptable.

The documentary on Tiruchelvam's life and legacy, Neelan: Unsilenced, revisits Tiruchelvam's life and assassination. Reviewing it in the Jaffna Monitor, Ragavan wrote that the film shows LTTE leaders rejecting the proposals because they had not been consulted and because the government was pursuing military action at the same time. He argued that this ignored the LTTE's own withdrawal from talks and return to war, and that a movement truly seeking peace could have tested the proposals under a ceasefire. He also cited Paikiasothy Saravanamuttu's observation in the film that a sincere Prabhakaran would have engaged with the proposals instead of rejecting them outright. According to Ragavan, the film shows how the LTTE, having branded Tiruchelvam the chief architect of the proposals, used the "traitor" label not only to silence critics but to eliminate those who imagined democratic alternatives. In the film the pro-LTTE figure M.K. Eelaventhan portrays Tiruchelvam as a collaborator, while others reject that framing. Academic Sharika Thiranagama argues that some view being called a traitor by the LTTE, which never pursued a democratic path, as a badge of honour. M. A. Sumanthiran notes that the label was used to justify the killings of Amirthalingam, Tiruchelvam and others who had devoted their lives to the Tamil cause, and the Tamil poet Cheran adds that no organization resembling the LTTE has ever shown a genuine commitment to democracy. Ragavan concluded that Tiruchelvam's assassination was not counter-violence against the state but brutality.

=== Expulsion of Muslims from the Northern Province (1990) ===
In October 1990 the LTTE expelled the entire Muslim population of the Northern Province, an act widely described as ethnic cleansing. About 22,000 Muslims were driven out of Jaffna and some 65,000 across the province, from communities that had lived in the region for centuries. On 30 October, LTTE cadres went door to door through Jaffna's Muslim neighbourhoods while loudspeakers ordered Muslim men to assemble at the Osmania College grounds. There C. Ilamparithy of the LTTE's Jaffna political wing and Karikalan, head of its eastern political wing, told them they had two hours to leave and could take nothing, and threatened to kill anyone who refused. Survivors told the journalist Aruliniyan Mahalingam that they were not allowed to return home, and that LTTE cadres strip-searched men and women and seized their gold, cash and jewelry, tearing ornaments from women's ears and necks. Each family was given 500 rupees before being taken by tractor to Sangupiddy and left to make its own way to Vavuniya. Cadres told some of those expelled that they were acting on orders from the high command.

Jeyaraj wrote that, according to LTTE sources, the decision was taken by Prabhakaran and his deputy Mahattaya, after a delegation led by Karikalan, the LTTE's eastern political wing leader, pressed Prabhakaran to punish northern Muslims in retaliation for Tamil–Muslim violence in the Eastern Province. The LTTE described the expulsion as a precautionary security measure and treated Muslims as "fifth columnists". At least 35 wealthy Muslim businessmen were also abducted, and 13 of them never returned. Many of those expelled spent years in refugee camps in Puttalam and elsewhere, and some returned to Jaffna only after the war ended. Shreen Saroor wrote that Prabhakaran remained conspicuously silent on the expulsion during the 2002–2005 peace negotiations.

=== Assassination of Rajiv Gandhi ===
The LTTE were allegedly involved in the assassination of Rajiv Gandhi, the ex-prime minister of India in 1991, which they denied involvement and alleged the event as an international conspiracy against them. However, in a 2011 interview, Kumaran Pathmanathan, who was the Treasurer of LTTE and its chief arms procurer, apologized to India for Velupillai Prabhakaran's "mistake" of killing former Prime Minister Rajiv Gandhi. He further said Rajiv's assassination was "well planned and done actually with Prabhakaran and (LTTE intelligence chief Pottu Amman). Everyone knows the truth". The TADA Court issued an arrest warrant for plotting of the assassination of Rajiv Gandhi. In October 2010 the charges against Prabhakaran were dropped by the TADA Court after the Central Bureau of Investigation filed a report stating that he was dead and the case was closed.

=== Exodus from Jaffna (1995) ===
As the Sri Lanka Army advanced on Jaffna in late 1995, the LTTE ordered the city's civilian population to leave. On the evening of 30 October 1995, LTTE loudspeakers in Jaffna town told residents to evacuate to Thenmaradchi and Vadamaradchi that same night, and LTTE cadres went from house to house ordering people out and warning that Chemmani bridge would be blown up early the next morning. The bridge was never destroyed. The LTTE's radio bulletin that night made no mention of the order, and in the following days the organisation denied that it had ordered the exodus while continuing to force civilians out. According to UTHR(J), residents were given four hours to leave, and hundreds of thousands of people were forced to walk out at night under heavy rain through the flooded land of Chemmani and Kaithady. In a recruitment appeal published on 9 November, the LTTE itself said that more than 500,000 people had left Jaffna in a single night. UTHR(J) noted that the international media came to blame the LTTE for engineering a forced exodus. It also recorded that many evacuees compared their plight to the Expulsion of Muslims from the Northern Province of Sri Lanka five years earlier, recalling that they had been given four hours to leave while the Muslims had been given two.

=== Peace talks ===
Prabhakaran's first and only major press conference was held in Killinochchi on 10 April 2002. It was reported that more than 200 journalists from the local and foreign media attended this event and they had to go through a 10-hour security screening before the event in which Anton Balasingham introduced the LTTE leader as the "President and Prime Minister of Tamil Eelam." A number of questions were asked about LTTE's commitment towards the erstwhile peace process and Prabhakaran and Dr. Anton Balasingham jointly answered the questions. Repeated questions about his involvement in the Rajiv Gandhi assassination were only answered in a sober note by both Balasingham and Prabhakaran. They called it a "tragic incident" ("Thunbiyal Chambavam", as quoted in Tamil) they requested the press "not to dig into an incident that happened 10 years ago."

During the interview, he stated that the right condition has not risen to give up the demand of Tamil Eelam. He further mentioned that "There are three fundamentals. That is Tamil homeland, Tamil nationality and Tamil right to self-determination. These are the fundamental demands of the Tamil people. Once these demands are accepted or a political solution is put forward by recognising these three fundamentals and our people are satisfied with the solutions we will consider giving up the demand for Eelam." He further added that Tamil Eelam was not only the demand of the LTTE but also the demand of the Tamil people.

Prabhakaran also answered a number of questions in which he reaffirmed their commitment towards the peace process, quoted "We are sincerely committed to the peace process. It is because we are sincerely committed to peace that we continued a four month cessation of hostilities". He was also firm in de-proscription of the LTTE by Sri Lanka and India, "We want the government of India to lift the ban on the LTTE. We will raise the issue at the appropriate time."

Prabhakaran also insisted firmly that only de-proscription would bring forth an amenable solution to the ongoing peace process mediated by Norway: "We have informed the government, we have told the Norwegians that de-proscription is a necessary condition for the commencements of talks."

=== 2005 presidential election boycott ===
In the November 2005 presidential election, the LTTE enforced a boycott of the vote in the Tamil areas of the north and east. According to journalist D. B. S. Jeyaraj, the LTTE first declared itself neutral. As support grew among Tamils for the United National Party candidate Ranil Wickremesinghe, who had entered into a ceasefire with the LTTE, lifted the ban on it and favoured exploring a federal solution, LTTE leaders and media began attacking him as the more "dangerous" candidate. At a press conference on 10 November 2005, after a joint meeting with the LTTE, Rajavarothayam Sampanthan of the Tamil National Alliance (TNA) announced the boycott on behalf of the LTTE and the TNA. He said the election would not produce any progressive advance towards resolving the Tamil question, so the two had decided it was futile to take part, and that the Tamil people were in full agreement with "our thinking". Jeyaraj wrote that this phrase showed the boycott was imposed from above by the LTTE rather than reflecting the people's wishes.

The LTTE assured intermediaries for Wickremesinghe that it would not enforce the boycott, but before and on polling day its cadres used violence and intimidation to stop Tamils from voting. In Jaffna grenades were thrown at Eelam People's Democratic Party offices, police patrols and polling stations, and a youth was beaten to death in public. In Batticaloa a sub-postmistress who allegedly refused to hand over polling cards was hacked to death. Roads were blocked, voters were threatened and assaulted, and one man who had voted had his inked finger cut off. The Sri Lanka Democracy Forum said that LTTE cadres serving as polling agents were used to intimidate voters inside polling booths and to identify them for retribution. Turnout in Jaffna District was 1.5 per cent, and only one person voted in the LTTE-controlled Kilinochchi division.

Mahinda Rajapaksa won with 4,887,152 votes (50.29 per cent) to Wickremesinghe's 4,706,366 (48.43 per cent), a margin of 180,786. Jeyaraj estimated that the boycott cost Wickremesinghe 250,000 to 300,000 Tamil votes, enough to have changed the result. He argued that the LTTE preferred a hardline government in Colombo because it expected international opinion to turn against such a government if war resumed, and that by disenfranchising Tamils through terror the LTTE showed that its writ did not extend to all Tamils and exposed its insincere commitment to a negotiated settlement. Rajapaksa's government went on to defeat the LTTE militarily in 2009.

=== Sri Lankan Army Northern offensive and death ===
When the Sri Lankan military rapidly advanced into the last LTTE held territory in the final days of 2008–2009 SLA Northern offensive, Prabhakaran and his top leadership retreated into Vellamullivaikkal, Mullaitivu. Fierce fighting occurred between LTTE and the Sri Lanka Army during these last few days. At around 3:00 a.m. on 18 May 2009, Prabhakaran's son Charles Anthony tried to break the defenses of the Army, but was unsuccessful. He died along with around 100 other LTTE fighters. Troops found 12 million rupees in his possession. By noon that day, reports emerged that Prabhakaran was killed by a rocket attack while trying to flee the conflict zone in a captured ambulance and his body was badly burned. But this rumour was proven false in a short while. Skirmishes occurred also in the evening of 18 May around eastern bank of Nandikadal lagoon. A team of LTTE cadres consisting of 30 most loyal bodyguards of Prabhakaran and Prabhakaran himself tried to sneak through the mangrove islands of Nandikadal to its west bank. It has been alleged that one bodyguard had a can of gasoline with him to burn the Tiger leader's body if he was killed or committed suicide. This was to prevent the enemy seizing his body. Clearing and mopping-up operations were carried out by troops under Colonel G. V. Ravipriya from 3:30 pm to 6:30 pm that evening, but they did not encounter this last group of LTTE fighters that day. At 7:30 am next morning, mopping-up operations started again. This time, they were confronted by the fighters, led by Prabhakaran himself. Fighting went on until 9:30 am 19 May 2009. The firing stopped as all LTTE fighters died in the battle. Troops started collecting bodies again. This time, Sergeant Muthu Banda, attached to Sri Lanka Army Task Force VIII, reported to Ravipriya that a body similar to Prabhakaran's had been found. After the body, which was floating among the mangroves, was brought ashore, Colonel Ravipriya positively identified it as that of the leader of the LTTE. A dog tag marked 001, two pistols, a T56 rifle with telescopic sight, a satellite phone, and a canister filled with diabetic medicine were found along with the body.

At 12:15 pm army commander Sarath Fonseka officially announced Prabhakaran's death on TV. At around 1:00 pm his body was shown in Swarnavahini for the first time. Prabakaran's identity was confirmed by Karuna Amman, his former confidant, and through DNA testing against genetic material from his son, who had been killed earlier by the Sri Lankan military. Circumstantial evidence suggested that his death was caused by massive head trauma; several claims on his death have been made and it's alleged that his death was due to a shot at close range. There are also allegations that he was executed, a claim vehemently denied by Sri Lankan authorities. Karuna Amman claimed Prabhakaran shot himself but it was denied by Fonseka who claimed the injury was from shrapnel citing the lack of an exit wound. A week later, the new Tamil Tiger leader, Selvarasa Pathmanathan, admitted that Prabhakaran was dead.

==== Claims of survival ====
Despite the announcement of his death by both the Sri Lankan government and LTTE remnants, certain groups and media have claimed that Prabhakaran survived the war and managed to escape. In 2009, a Tamil website showed an image showing Prabhakaran viewing a news report of his death in TV which was sent to France 24 as proof of his survival. France 24 noted that the photo appeared to be photoshopped. In 2010, pro-LTTE website TamilWin claimed that the body of Prabhakaran shown belonged to a Sri Lankan soldier, showing images of a Prabhakaran look-alike in the Sri Lankan army. The theory of Prabhakaran's survival is also supported by Tamil Nadu politician Vaiko who claims Prabhakaran would emerge from hiding at the right time. The claim of Prabhakaran's survival was reiterated in 2023 by Indian activist Pazha Nedumaran, who declared through a press conference held at Thanjavur that the slain leader of LTTE is "still alive and doing well" and that he has been in contact with Prabhakaran's family. The claim was rejected by Sri Lanka which issued a statement stating that Prabhakaran's corpse had been confirmed by his close associates as well as DNA testing.

== Philosophy and ideology ==
Prabhakaran was influenced by prominent Indian nationalists Subhas Chandra Bose and Bhagat Singh, both of whom participated in the revolutionary movement for Indian independence. Prabhakaran never developed a systematic philosophy, but did declare that his goal was 'revolutionary socialism and the creation of an egalitarian society'. His rare interviews, his annual Tamil Eelam Heroes Day speeches and the LTTE's policies and actions can be taken as indicators of Prabhakaran's philosophy and ideology. Religion was not a major factor in his philosophy or ideology; the Tamil Tigers' ideology emerged from Marxist-Leninist thought and was explicitly secular. Its leadership professed opposition to religion. It focused single-mindedly on attaining an independent Tamil Eelam. The following are important aspects of Prabhakaran's philosophy and ideology.

=== Eelam Tamil nationalism ===
Prabhakaran is often seen as a martyr to the Eelam Tamil people. His source of inspiration and direction was Eelam Tamil nationalism, and his stated and ultimate ideal was to get Tamil Eelam recognised as a nation as per the U.N. Charter that guarantees the right of a people to political independence. The LTTE also proposed the formation of an Interim Self Governing Authority during Peace Negotiations in 2003. Former Tamil guerrilla and politician Dharmalingam Sithadthan has remarked that Prabhakaran's "dedication to the cause of the Tamil Eelam was unquestionable, he was the only man in Sri Lanka who could decide if there should be war or peace."

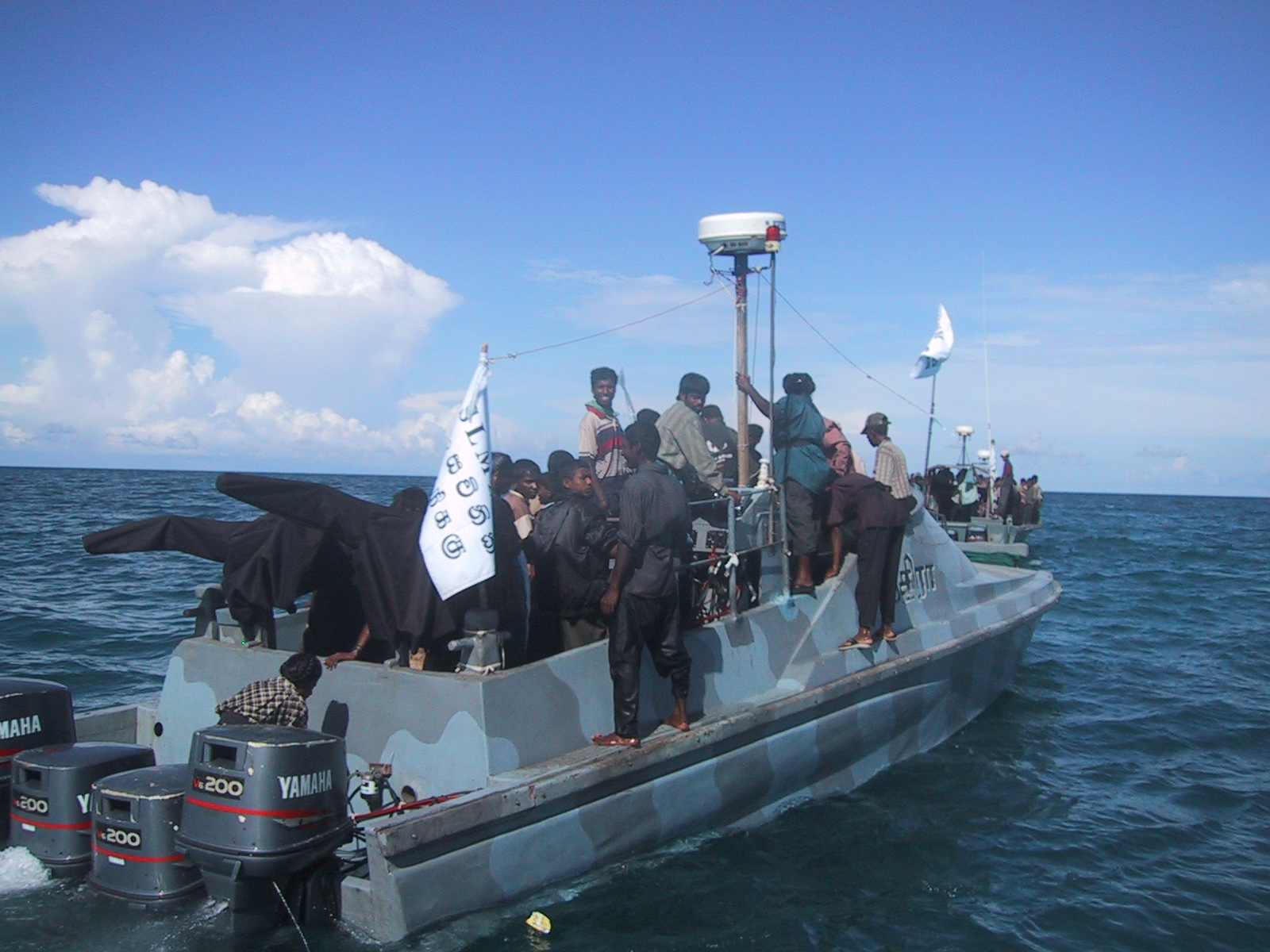
The LTTEs Sea Tigers wing

=== Militarism of the LTTE ===
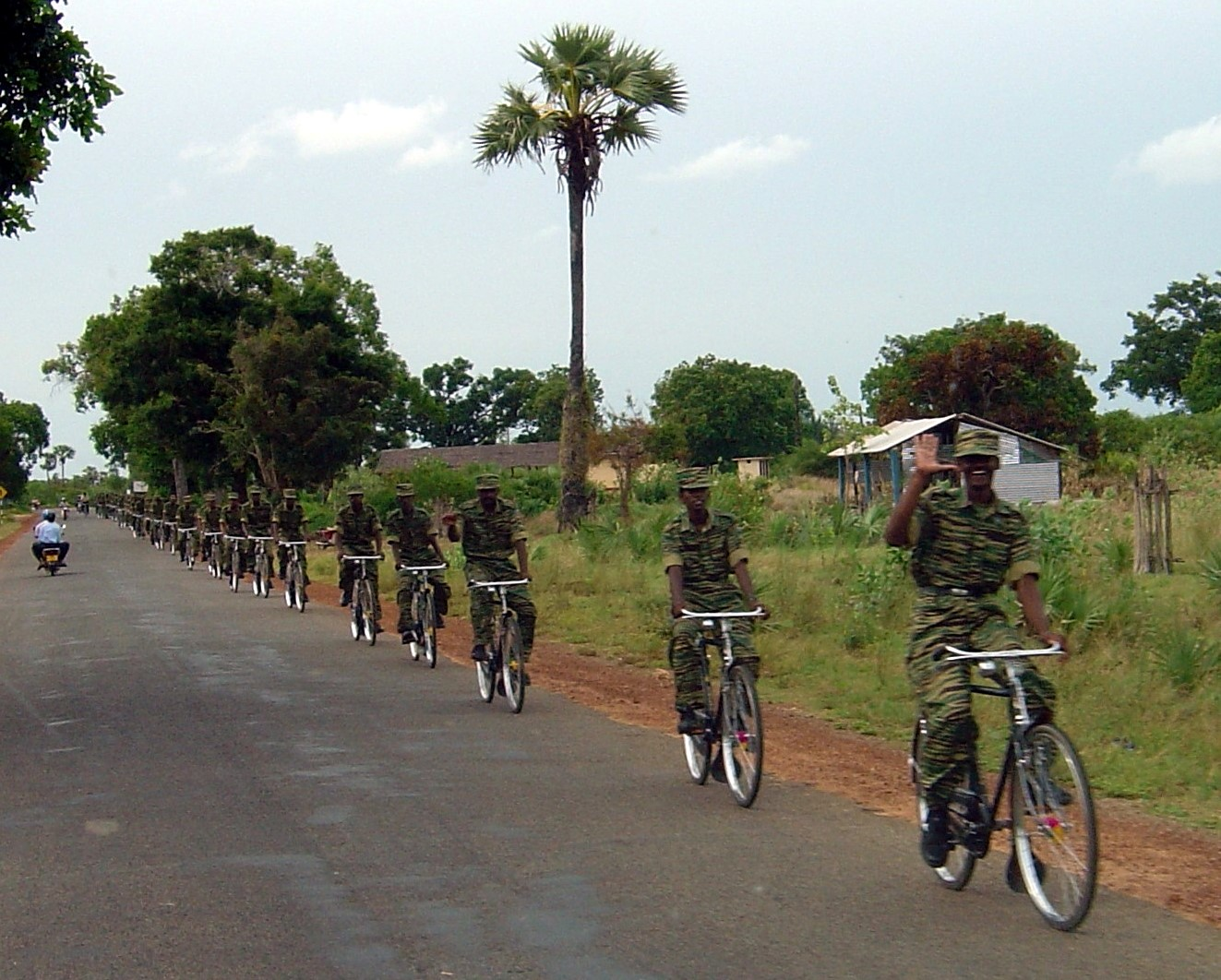
LTTE ground troops

Prabhakaran explicitly stated that an armed struggle is the only way to resist asymmetric warfare, in which one side, that of the Sri Lankan government, is armed and the other comparatively unarmed. He argued that he chose military means only after observing that non–violent means have been ineffectual and obsolete, especially after the Thileepan incident. Thileepan, a Lt. colonel rank officer adopted Gandhian means to protest against the IPKF killings by staging a fast unto death from 15 September 1987, and by abstaining from food or water until 26 September, when he died in front of thousands of Tamils who had come there to fast along with him.

Tactically, Prabhakaran perfected the recruitment and use of suicide bomber units. His fighters usually took no prisoners and were notorious for assaults that often left every single enemy soldier dead. Interpol described him as someone who was "very alert, known to use disguise and capable of handling sophisticated weaponry and explosives." He was called a "military genius" by western military experts.

The LTTE also forcibly recruited young people, including children. Kagusthan Ariaratnam, a former LTTE intelligence operative, said he was forcibly recruited at seventeen while a mathematics student, under an unwritten LTTE rule that every family must contribute one member to the war. He said the Tigers ruled through intimidation, constantly threatening cadres and their families, and that members were ordered to monitor Tamils, including in the diaspora, to secure financial support, with refusal meaning prison or execution. Ariaratnam, who regards the Tamil cause as just, called the LTTE's methods "abhorrent", citing its suicide bombings and its assassinations of Tamil leaders.

== Personal life ==
Prabhakaran was married to Mathivathani Erambu on 1 October 1984 at Tirupporur, near Chennai. The military spokesman Udaya Nanayakkara said in May 2009 that there was no information about the whereabouts of the remaining members of Prabhakaran's family. "We have not found their bodies and have no information about them," he said. It is thought that the entire family was wiped out, although the bodies of Mathivathani and Duvaraga were never found. His 12-year old son Balachandran was allegedly executed.

Prabhakaran's parents, Thiruvenkadam Velupillai and Parvathi, both in their 70s, were found in the Menik Farm camp for displaced people near the town of Vavuniya. The Sri Lankan military and the government gave public assurances that they would not be interrogated, harmed or ill-treated. They were taken into Sri Lankan military custody until Vellupillai's death in January 2010. Prabhakaran has a sister, Vinodini Rajendaran.

One of Prabhakaran's personal bodyguards was Captain Mayuran (Saba), who served in his close protection unit in the early 1990s and was killed in the Battle of Pooneryn in 1993.

=== Other names ===
Prabhakaran had over the years built up the LTTE into a powerful movement running a shadow state and had acquired the status of being "Thesiya Thalaivar" (National Leader of the Land). He was called thambi, meaning "younger brother", by Eelam Tamil elders, which was also his pet name since he was the youngest in his family. He was also called as Anna/Annai, meaning 'elder brother' by his younger cadets and the younger Eelam Tamil people. Prabhakaran was also called "Karikalan" for his bravery and his administration (in reference to Karikala Chola, a famous Chola king who ruled in Sangam Age). He was additionally raised to divine status as Sooriyathevan (God of the Sun) by his followers. This was a title used by some of his supporters and within the LTTE to emphasize his leadership and charisma. Prabhakaran was a controversial figure and his moniker as "Sooriyathevan" was symbolic rather than a religious or widely accepted title.
