= Kopalasingham Sritharan =

Kopalasingham Sritharan is a Tamil Human Rights activist who along with Rajan Hoole ran the University Teachers for Human Rights while affiliated to the Department of Mathematics, University of Jaffna. He was awarded the prestigious Martin Ennals Award for Human Rights Defenders in 2007 along with Rajan Hoole for his work in documenting Human Rights violations and abuses in the civil conflict in Sri Lanka. He also worked in Afghanistan and Nepal in UN missions as a Human Rights Officer and a Civil Affairs Officer respectively. He is a co-author of Broken Palmyra, which was the first book published in English analyzing the violent nature of politics in the North and East of Sri Lanka and its effects on civilians. Since the murder of co-author Rajani Thiranagama, he has rarely appeared in public. His place of residence is not known to many and he does not divulge this in fear of reprisals.
