= Kanagaratnam =

Kanagaratnam கனகரத்தினம்
- Pronunciation: Kaṉakaraṭṇam
- Gender: Male
- Language: Tamil

Origin
- Meaning: Gold and Gem
- Region of origin: Southern India; North-eastern Sri Lanka

Other names
- Alternative spelling: Canagaratnam

Kanagaratnam or Canagaratnam (Tamil: கனகரத்தினம்) is a Tamil male given name. Due to the Tamil tradition of using patronymic surnames, it may also be a surname for males and females.

== Notable people ==
=== Given name ===
- A. Canagaratnam (born 1873), Ceylonese lawyer and politician
- K. Kanagaratnam (1892–1952), Ceylonese politician
- M. Canagaratnam (1924–1980), Ceylonese politician
- Sathasivam Kanagaratnam (born 1946), Sri Lankan politician
- S. O. Canagaratnam (1880–1938), Ceylonese politician
- Vinthan Kanagaratnam, Sri Lankan politician

=== Surname ===
- Aaryan Dinesh Kanagaratnam (born 1981), Sri Lankan musician
- Kanagaratnam Sriskandan (1930–2010), Ceylonese engineer
- Kanagaratnam Thavalingam, Sri Lankan geographer
