= Kandiah =

Kandiah கந்தையா
- Pronunciation: Kantaiyā
- Gender: Male
- Language: Tamil

Origin
- Region of origin: Southern India; North-eastern Sri Lanka

Kandiah (Tamil: கந்தையா) is a Tamil male given name. Due to the Tamil tradition of using patronymic surnames it may also be a surname for men and women.

== People ==
=== Given name ===
- P. Kandiah (1914–1960), Ceylonese politician
- V. A. Kandiah (1891–1963), Ceylonese politician

=== Surname ===
- Arumugam Kandaiah Premachandran (born 1957), Sri Lankan politician
- Arumugam Kandiah Sarveswaran, Sri Lankan politician
- Kandiah Arulanandan (1925–2004), Ceylonese engineer and academic
- Kandiah Balasegaran (1965–2008), Sri Lankan rebel
- Kandiah Balendra (born 1940), Sri Lankan businessman
- Kandiah David Arulpragasam (1931–2003), Sri Lankan academic
- Kandiah Kamalesvaran (born 1934), Australian singer
- Kandiah Kanagaratnam (1892–1952), Ceylonese politician
- Kandiah Navaratnam (born 1935), Sri Lankan politician
- Kandiah Neelakandan (1947–2018), Sri Lankan lawyer
- Kandiah Sivanesan, Sri Lankan politician
- Kandiah Thirugnansampandapillai Francis (1939–2013), Sri Lankan cricket official
- Kandiah Ulaganathan (1966–2006), Sri Lankan rebel
