= Charles Anthony Prabhakaran =

- சார்ல்ஸ் அன்ரனி பிரபாகரன்
- Born: 18 April 1985; Tamil Nadu, India
- Died: 18 May 2009 (aged 24); Nanthikadal Lagoon area, Mullaitivu District, Sri Lanka
- Occupation: Member of the Liberation Tigers of Tamil Eelam
- Known for: Eldest son of Velupillai Prabhakaran
- Parents: Velupillai Prabhakaran (father); Mathivathani Erambu (mother)
- Relatives: Duvaraga (sister); Balachandran Prabhakaran (brother)

Charles Anthony Prabhakaran (Tamil: சார்ல்ஸ் அன்ரனி பிரபாகரன்; 18 April 1985 – 18 May 2009) was the eldest son of Velupillai Prabhakaran, the founder and leader of the Liberation Tigers of Tamil Eelam (LTTE), a militant organisation in Sri Lanka. He was associated with the LTTE's air wing, known as the Air Tigers, and its technical and computer units.

== Early life ==
Charles Anthony was the eldest son of Velupillai Prabhakaran and Mathivathani Erambu. Contemporary reports in 2007 described him as 22 years old. He reportedly left Sri Lanka in 2003 to study aeronautical engineering at a university in Europe and returned to northern Sri Lanka in 2006.

== Role in the LTTE ==
In June 2007, India Today reported that Charles Anthony had joined the LTTE. The organisation's military spokesperson confirmed that he had been inducted into the movement. The report stated that he was believed to have contributed to the development of the aircraft used by the LTTE's Air Tigers, including a bomb-release mechanism. These aircraft had been used in an attack on the Katunayake airbase in March 2007.

In February 2009, The Indian Express reported that Anthony was believed to be heading the LTTE's air wing and computer unit. The report, citing statements attributed to captured LTTE members, also said that he was commanding a contingent of fighters alongside other senior LTTE leaders.

In April 2009, reports stated that Anthony had been seriously injured during fighting near Puthukkudiyiruppu in northeastern Sri Lanka. According to reports citing Sri Lankan military officials, he had been wounded in clashes in March 2009.

== Death ==
Charles Anthony was reported killed on 18 May 2009 during the final stages of the Sri Lankan Civil War. Reports citing Sri Lankan military sources stated that his body was found during military operations in the northern part of the country, near the Nanthikadal Lagoon. He was 24 years old at the time of his death.
