= Sharika Thiranagama =

Political anthropologist

- Spouse: Thomas Blom Hansen
- Parent(s): Rajini Thiranagama, Dayapala Thiranagama

Academic background
- Thesis: Stories of Home: Generation, Memory, and Displacement among Jaffna Tamils and Jaffna Muslims (2006)

Academic work
- Institutions: Stanford University
- Notable works: In My Mother’s House: Civil War in Sri Lanka
- Website: https://anthropology.stanford.edu/people/sharika-thiranagama

Sharika Thiranagama is a political anthropologist at Stanford University. She is the daughter of Sri Lankan Tamil human rights activist and feminist Rajani Thiranagama, who was murdered by LTTE in 1989. She was the president of the American Institute for Sri Lankan Studies from 2017-2020. Her first book In My Mother’s House: Civil War in Sri Lanka was published by University of Pennsylvania Press in 2011.

== Early life ==
Sharika was born to Sinhalese father and Tamil mother. Her mother Rajani Thiranagama (née Rajasingham) was a human rights activist and feminist. She was the head of the Department of Anatomy at the University of Jaffna and a founding member of the University Teachers for Human Rights. Liberation Tigers of Tamil Eelam was implicated in the assassination, but this had not been proved legally. Identity of the assassin is not known.

Though belonging to the Sri Lankan majority community (Sinhalese people) and minority community (Sri Lankan Tamils), she was raised speaking Tamil in Jaffna. Then, the northern Jaffna Peninsula was at the height of the Sri Lankan Civil War. Recounting her childhood days, she says that running into bunkers was a regular occurrence since the Sri Lankan army bombing started. She also recounts listening to stories of Indian Army arriving in Sri Lanka and subsequent rumours of rapes. On the evening of 21 September 1989, her mother did not come home,

[my] sister and I waited for our mother to come home from work to the temporary house we were renting at the time... My mother never came back home that 21 September; her journey was ended by LTTE assassins in front of the house. Her body returned like us to “our home,” my ur, my grandparents’ house and village where she and we had been born and had lived for most of our lives... My childhood ended. My sister and I left Sri Lanka for London with our father who came to get us, flying on 25 December 1989. On 26 December our new lives as refugees in London began.

== Research and writing ==
=== In My Mother's House: Civil War in Sri Lanka ===
The book title takes a cue from Kwame Anthony Appiah's essay "In My Father's House" written in 1992 which recounts his return to Ghana for his father's funeral.

Thiranagama undertook her fieldwork in Sri Lanka between 2002 and 2004 of the Sri Lankan Civil War. She also did parts of her research in London and Toronto between 2003 and 2006. Since the fieldwork commenced at a time of ceasefire and negotiations between the Liberation Tigers of Tamil Eelam (LTTE) and the government, Thiranagama could return to Jaffna as well as conduct research in the settlements of displaces Muslims.

The book engages with Muslims expelled from Jaffna District and Mannar District in 1990 as well Hindu and Christian Tamils forced to flee Jaffna. These two exodus displaced 70,000 Muslims and 400,000 Tamils.

Anthropologist Dennis B. McGilvray notes that the book provides a rare glimpse of Tamil and Muslim 'kinship and marriage bonds under conditions of extreme duress and displacement.' Anthropologist Mark Whitaker found Thiranagama's argument about LTTE brilliant but incomplete. His two main points of contention were: there is evidence to show local Tamil attitudes towards LTTE were more 'various, changeable, ambiguous, and situationally nuanced' rather being general loathing and fearful; and LTTE developing its state of exception by itself rather than in dialogue with the Sri Lankan state. Nevertheless, his critique does not discredit the book. Rather, Whitaker calls the book a theoretical achievement in Anthropology and a powerful ethnography. He recommends everyone interested in Sri Lanka to read the book. Anthropologist Tom Widger praises the book for making several important contributions to studies of the Sri Lanka war and Sri Lankan anthropology and sociology. He calls it 'a remarkable book by a remarkable anthropologist.' He adds,

First, the book complicates popular portrayal of the war and its victims as simply being composed of two opposing sides–Tamil/LTTE and Sinhala/government–to show how Tamils were victims not only of government violence but of LTTE violence as well, as was a third and often overlooked community, Sri Lankan Muslims. In doing so, the book also shows how the LTTE hardly spoke for the Tamil community as a whole, and challenges simplistic relationships between 'individuality' and 'ethnicity', on the one hand, and concepts of 'home' and 'homeland' on the other.
