= T. Thirunavukarasu =

Sri Lankan Tamil politician and Member of Parliament (1933–1982)

Hon. T. Thirunavukarasu MP
- தா. திருநாவுக்கரசு

Member of Parliament for Vaddukoddai
- In office 1977–1982
- Preceded by: A. Thiagarajah
- Succeeded by: Neelan Tiruchelvam

Personal details
- Born: 1 September 1933
- Died: 1 August 1982 (aged 48)
- Party: All Ceylon Tamil Congress
- Other political affiliations: Tamil United Liberation Front
- Ethnicity: Sri Lankan Tamil

Thamodarampillai Thirunavukarasu (Tamil: தாமோதரம்பிள்ளை திருநாவுக்கரசு; 1 September 1933 – 1 August 1982) was a Sri Lankan Tamil politician and Member of Parliament.

== Early life ==
Thirunavukarasu was born on 1 September 1933. He was from Vaddukoddai in northern Ceylon.

== Political career ==
At the 1970 parliamentary election, Thirunavukarasu was the All Ceylon Tamil Congress's (ACTC) candidate in Kankesanthurai, but was defeated by the Illankai Tamil Arasu Kachchi (Federal Party) candidate S. J. V. Chelvanayakam.

On 14 May 1972 the ACTC, ITAK, Ceylon Workers' Congress, Eelath Thamilar Otrumai Munnani and All Ceylon Tamil Conference formed the Tamil United Front, later renamed Tamil United Liberation Front (TULF). Thirunavukarasu became the TUF's joint treasurer. Thirunavukarasu entered Parliament after winning the 1977 parliamentary election as the Tamil United Liberation Front's candidate in Vaddukoddai.

Thirunavukarasu died of a heart attack on 1 August 1982.
