= Vaddukoddai Electoral District =

Electoral district of Sri Lanka

Vaddukoddai Electoral District was an electoral district of Sri Lanka between August 1947 and February 1989. The district was named after the town of Vaddukoddai in Jaffna District, Northern Province. The 1978 Constitution of Sri Lanka introduced the proportional representation electoral system for electing members of Parliament. The existing 160 mainly single-member electoral districts were replaced with 22 multi-member electoral districts. Vaddukoddai electoral district was replaced by the Jaffna multi-member electoral district at the 1989 general elections, the first under the PR system, though Vaddukoddai continues to be a polling division of the multi-member electoral district.

== Members of Parliament ==
Key

Independent ACTC ITAK TULF

Election	Member	Party	Term
1947	K. Kanagaratnam	All Ceylon Tamil Congress	1947-1952
1952	V. Veerasingam	Independent	1952-1956
1956	A. Amirthalingam	Illankai Tamil Arasu Kachchi	1956-1960
1960 (March)	A. Amirthalingam	Illankai Tamil Arasu Kachchi	1960-1960
1960 (July)	A. Amirthalingam	Illankai Tamil Arasu Kachchi	1960-1965
1965	A. Amirthalingam	Illankai Tamil Arasu Kachchi	1965-1970
1970	A. Thiagarajah	All Ceylon Tamil Congress	1970-1977
1977	T. Thirunavukarasu	Tamil United Liberation Front	1977-1989

== Elections ==
=== 1947 Parliamentary General Election ===
Results of the 1st parliamentary election held between 23 August 1947 and 20 September 1947:

Candidate	Party	Symbol	Votes	%
K. Kanagaratnam	All Ceylon Tamil Congress	Elephant	11,721	61.24
V. Veerasingam		Umbrella	2,234	11.67
S. H. Perinpanayagam		Omnibus	1,716	8.97
V. Paramanayagam		Hand	1,540	8.05
K. Chanmugam		Pair of Scales	1,100	5.75
R. Ragupathy		Lamp	827	4.32
Valid Votes			19,138	98.59
Rejected Votes			274	1.41
Total Polled			19,412	100.00
Registered Electors			37,334	
Turnout				52.00

=== 1952 Parliamentary General Election ===
Results of the 2nd parliamentary election held between 24 May 1952 and 30 May 1952:

Candidate	Party	Symbol	Votes	%
V. Veerasingam	Independent	Bicycle	5,687	24.47
K. Kanagaratnam	All Ceylon Tamil Congress	Hand	5,261	22.64
A. Amirthalingam	Illankai Tamil Arasu Kachchi	Pair of Scales	4,500	19.36
Thillainathan Rudra		Umbrella	3,033	13.05
C. Ragunathan		Elephant	2,467	10.61
A. Vaidialingam		Key	2,294	9.87
Valid Votes			23,242	97.91
Rejected Votes			495	2.09
Total Polled			23,737	100.00
Registered Electors			34,135	
Turnout				69.54

=== 1956 Parliamentary General Election ===
Results of the 3rd parliamentary election held between 5 April 1956 and 10 April 1956:

Candidate	Party	Symbol	Votes	%
A. Amirthalingam	Illankai Tamil Arasu Kachchi	House	14,937	57.92
A. Vaidialingam	Communist Party	Star	10,850	42.08
Valid Votes			25,787	98.62
Rejected Votes			361	1.38
Total Polled			26,148	100.00
Registered Electors			35,927	
Turnout				72.78

=== 1960 (March) Parliamentary General Election ===
Results of the 4th parliamentary election held on 19 March 1960:

Candidate	Party	Symbol	Votes	%
A. Amirthalingam	Illankai Tamil Arasu Kachchi	House	11,524	53.52
Sanmugam Suntharasivam	Lanka Sama Samaja Party	Key	3,614	16.78
A. Vaidialingam	Communist Party	Star	3,180	14.77
M. P. Sangarapillai	All Ceylon Tamil Congress	Bicycle	2,955	13.72
C. S. Ratnasabapathy		Sun	260	1.21
Valid Votes			21,533	98.68
Rejected Votes			289	1.32
Total Polled			21,822	100.00
Registered Electors			28,955	
Turnout				75.37

=== 1960 (July) Parliamentary General Election ===
Results of the 5th parliamentary election held on 20 July 1960:

Candidate	Party	Symbol	Votes	%
A. Amirthalingam	Illankai Tamil Arasu Kachchi	House	13,454	72.10
A. Vaidialingam	Communist Party	Star	5,206	27.90
Valid Votes			18,660	98.60
Rejected Votes			265	1.40
Total Polled			18,925	100.00
Registered Electors			28,955	
Turnout				65.36

=== 1965 Parliamentary General Election ===
Results of the 6th parliamentary election held on 22 March 1965:

Candidate	Party	Symbol	Votes	%
A. Amirthalingam	Illankai Tamil Arasu Kachchi	House	15,498	60.78
K. Subramaniam	All Ceylon Tamil Congress	Bicycle	4,359	17.09
Arunasalam Thampipillay		Umbrella	4,082	16.01
I. R. Ariaratnam	Communist Party	Star	1,561	6.12
Valid Votes			25,500	98.88
Rejected Votes			290	1.12
Total Polled			25,790	100.00
Registered Electors			36,935	
Turnout				69.83

=== 1970 Parliamentary General Election ===
Results of the 7th parliamentary election held on 27 May 1970:

Candidate	Party	Symbol	Votes	%
A. Thiagarajah	All Ceylon Tamil Congress	Bicycle	14,359	51.29
A. Amirthalingam	Illankai Tamil Arasu Kachchi	House	13,634	48.71
Valid Votes			27,993	99.36
Rejected Votes			181	0.64
Total Polled			28,174	100.00
Registered Electors			35,812	
Turnout				78.67

=== 1977 Parliamentary General Election ===
Results of the 8th parliamentary election held on 21 July 1977:

Candidate	Party	Symbol	Votes	%
T. Thirunavukarasu	Tamil United Liberation Front	Sun	23,384	70.18%
A. Thiagarajah	Independent	Umbrella	5,176	15.53
V. Rattai		Eye	3,187	9.56
V. Rajasundaram		Pair of Scales	837	2.51
N. Ratnasingam		Elephant	480	1.44
V. Tharumalingam	Independent	Flower	150	0.45
M. Ambalavanar		Ship	107	0.32
Valid Votes			33,321	99.60
Rejected Votes			135	0.40
Total Polled			33,456	100.00
Registered Electors			40,684	
Turnout				82.23

T. Thirunavukarasu died on 1 August 1982. His replacement Neelan Tiruchelvam was sworn in on 8 March 1983.

Neelan Tiruchelvam and all other TULF MPs boycotted Parliament from the middle of 1983 for a number of reasons: they were under pressure from Sri Lankan Tamil militants not to stay in Parliament beyond their normal six-year term; the Sixth Amendment to the Constitution of Sri Lanka required them to swear an oath unconditionally renouncing support for a separate state; and the Black July riots in which up to 3,000 Tamils were murdered by Sinhalese mobs. After three months of absence, Tiruchelvam forfeited his seat in Parliament on 22 October 1983.
