= A. Thiagarajah =

Sri Lankan politician (1916–1981)

Hon. A. Thiagarajah MP
- ஆ. தியாகராஜா
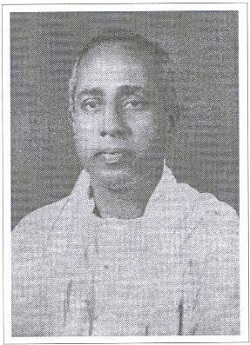

Member of the Ceylonese Parliament for Vaddukoddai
- In office 1970–1977
- Preceded by: A. Amirthalingam
- Succeeded by: T. Thirunavukarasu

Personal details
- Born: 17 April 1916
- Died: 25 May 1981 (aged 65)
- Party: United National Party
- Profession: Teacher
- Ethnicity: Sri Lankan Tamil

Arumugam Thiagarajah (Tamil: ஆறுமுகம் தியாகராஜா; 17 April 1916 – 25 May 1981) was a Sri Lankan Tamil teacher, politician and Member of Parliament. He died in May 1981, a day after being shot and injured an attack by a militant Tamil group.

== Early life ==
Thiagarajah was born on 17 April 1916. He was principal of Karainagar Hindu College.

== Career ==
Thiagarajah stood as the All Ceylon Tamil Congress's candidate in Vaddukoddai at the 1970 parliamentary election. He won the election and entered Parliament. He later defected to the governing Sri Lanka Freedom Party (SLFP) and voted for the new republican constitution. He was labelled a traitor by Tamil militants and Tamil nationalists. He was the target of an assassination attempt at his Colombo home in 1972. Thiagarajah contested the 1977 parliamentary election as an independent candidate but was resoundingly defeated by the Tamil United Liberation Front candidate T. Thirunavukarasu.

=== Assassination ===
The United National Party chose Thiagarajah to be its lead candidate in Jaffna District at the 1981 District Development Council election. Tamil militant groups had warned candidates not to contest for the UNP. He was shot by the militant People's Liberation Organisation of Tamil Eelam (PLOTE) on 24 May 1981 as he was addressing an election meeting in Moolai. He died the next day in hospital.
