= Thomas Blom Hansen =

Danish anthropologist

Thomas Blom Hansen (born 22 January 1958 in Frederiksvaerk) is a Danish anthropologist and commentator on religious and political violence in India.

== Background ==
Hansen has a BA in Sociology and an MA in political theory from the University of Aalborg in Denmark. He then did development work in Orissa, India, in the mid-1980s. He became interested in anthropology during a PhD on Indian nationalism in Pune and Mumbai in western India, begun in the late 1980s when he was unexpectedly granted a research visa to study nationalism. He graduated from Roskilde University and his D.Phil. was later made into a book (The Saffron Wave, 1999).

Hansen taught in the multidisciplinary International Development Studies program at Roskilde University until 1999, becoming associate professor. He spent one year as a visiting scholar at the University of Natal (Durban) in 1998–99, where he also began new research. He then became a reader in social anthropology at the University of Edinburgh in late 1999, resigning to become professor of anthropology at Yale University. In 2006, he accepted a chair of religion and society at the University of Amsterdam, where he also served as dean of the International School for Humanities and Social Sciences. Since 2010 he has been the Reliance-Dhirubhai Ambani Professor in South Asian Studies and professor in anthropology at Stanford University. He also serves as director of Stanford's Center for South Asia.

He has two children with his first wife, and is married to an assistant professor at Stanford Sharika Thiranagama, daughter of the Tamil activist Rajini Thiranagama (1954 –1989). They have a son and daughter.

== Scholarly contributions ==
Hansen's research in India focused initially on the rise of Hindu nationalism. He began a study of its local roots and organization in Pune, one of the historical strongholds of the larger Hindu nationalist movement. Later, he studied the Shiv Sena, a powerful militant movement in Mumbai that played a dominant role in the political and social life for several decades. This was in the early 1990s when violent clashes occurred between Hindu nationalists and Muslims.

In the late 1990s he worked on religious identities, local political organization and informal networks in Bombay/Mumbai (Wages of Violence, 2001).

In the late 1990s and again in 2007 he worked on religious revival and the everyday meanings of freedom and belonging in post-apartheid South Africa, based in a formerly Indian township in Durban (Melancholia of Freedom, 2012).

More generally he has contributed to understanding of the anthropology of politics, the postcolonial state and sovereignty, and identity politics in urban environments.

Hansen is part of an international research network entitled "The Religious Lives of Migrants," funded by the Ford Foundation and the Social Science Research Council in New York, which explores religious meanings and institutions among international migrants in Kuala Lumpur, London and Johannesburg.

== Recognition ==
- Alexander von Humboldt international Professorship, Germany, 2009. E5 million (declined to join Stanford University).

== Selected publications ==
- Chatterji, A.P., T.B. Hansen, and C. Jaffrelot (eds). 2019.Majoritarian State: How Hindu Nationalism is Changing India. Hurst & Company.
- Hansen, T.B. 2012. Melancholia of Freedom. Social Life in an Indian Township in South Africa. Princeton University Press.
- Hansen, T.B. and F. Stepputat. 2005. Sovereign Bodies. Citizens, Migrants and states in the postcolonial world. Princeton University Press.
- Hansen, T.B. and F. Stepputat. 2001. States of Imagination. Ethnographic Explorations of the Postcolonial State Duke University Press.
- Hansen, T.B. 2001. Wages of Violence. Naming and Identity in Postcolonial Bombay. Princeton University Press.
- Hansen, T.B. 1999. The Saffron Wave. Democracy and Hindu Nationalism in Modern India. Princeton University Press.
