= Bindunuwewa massacre =

2000 massacre of Tamil detainees in Sri Lanka

- Bindunuwewa (Sri Lanka)
- Location: Bindunuwewa, Bandarawela, Sri Lanka
- Date: October 25, 2000; 26 years ago
- Attack type: Massacre
- Weapons: Clubs, knives, fire
- Deaths: 27 Tamil detainees
- Injuries: 14 seriously injured
- Perpetrators: Sinhalese mob, Sri Lanka Police

The Bindunuwewa Massacre or Bindunuwewa Prison Massacre took place on 24 October 2000 at a detention centre of Bindunuwewa, Sri Lanka, where 27 Tamil detainees were killed by a Sinhalese mob and police. The case became emblematic of the institutional discrimination against Tamils as all the accused were acquitted by the Supreme Court.

== Background ==
The low-security detention centre was established to house a total of 41 Tamil youths, the youngest being 12 year old, with alleged links to the rebel group LTTE, though none were formally charged. Some of the inmates included former child soldiers who surrendered to the government. The Sri Lankan government had used the LTTE recruitment of child soldiers as a powerful propaganda tool against the rebels and the UNICEF-supported detention centre for the "rehabilitation" of former child soldiers served as a showpiece aimed at impressing the international community.

== Massacre ==
On 24 October 2000, a mob of a few hundred villagers armed with knives, rods and torches stormed the detention centre. The Sri Lankan Army detachment that was posted there had been withdrawn the previous day, for unknown reasons. Once the massacre started, the posted police personnel refused to intervene to stop it. Of the 26 killed, two were under the age of 21 and the rest were between 21 and 30.

== Reactions ==
=== Protests and violence ===
Police and Sinhalese mobs attacked an anti-massacre protest by Indian Tamils. Following this, there were burnings of Sinhalese and Tamil shops. Members of both communities were displaced by the violence. Overall, six Tamils were killed by either the state or Sinhalese mobs and three Tamil women were abducted and raped by a mob.

=== Government response ===
Initially the government responded by saying that the detainees had rioted and that the massacre was an outcome of an attempt to control the rioting. Then it was claimed that the police were unable to protect the detainees in the face of superior mob force. Eventually, the government charged a few police officers with crime. Most were initially convicted of murder but were later acquitted by the Sri Lankan Supreme Court in 2005. The Supreme Court pinned the blame on the victims and suggested that their alleged LTTE links mitigated the guilt of the accused. The court proceedings were criticized for their unprofessionalism and ethnic bias. International organizations and NGOs were also criticized for their complicity in having knowingly lent legitimacy to the government without ensuring the safety of the detainees. The government has long claimed that they treat captives with care, however, seven traumatized survivors of the massacre reported being taken to a military hospital where they were handcuffed to their beds for 6 months.

== See also ==
- List of attacks attributed to Sri Lankan government forces
- List of attacks attributed to the LTTE
- List of massacres in Sri Lanka
