= V. Veerasingam =

Ceylon Tamil teacher, politician and Member of Parliament

Hon. V. Veerasingam MP MBE
- வி. வீரசிங்கம்

Member of the Ceylonese Parliament for Vaddukoddai
- In office 1952–1956
- Preceded by: K. Kanagaratnam
- Succeeded by: A. Amirthalingam

Personal details
- Born: 1892
- Died: 5 December 1964
- Education: Ceylon University College
- Profession: Teacher
- Ethnicity: Ceylon Tamil

Visuvalingam Veerasingam MBE (Tamil: விசுவலிங்கம் வீரசிங்கம்; 1892 – 5 December 1964) was a Ceylon Tamil teacher, politician and Member of Parliament.

== Early life and family ==
Veerasingam was born in 1892. He was from Manipay in northern Ceylon. After school he joined the Ceylon University College, graduating in 1921 with a B.A. degree.

== Career ==
Veerasingam was a teacher at Manipay Hindu College before becoming its principal in April 1922.

After retiring in 1951 Veerasingam played a key role in the co-operative movement in Jaffna District. He was elected the first president of the Federation of Co-operative Societies, Jaffna District, a position he held until his death. The Veerasingam Hall, a public hall/office building in Jaffna owned by the co-operative society, was named after him.

Veerasingam contested the 1947 parliamentary election as an independent candidate in Vaddukoddai but was defeated by the All Ceylon Tamil Congress candidate K. Kanagaratnam. He however won the 1952 parliamentary election and entered Parliament.

Veerasingam was made a Member of the Order of the British Empire in the 1952 New Year Honours. He died on 5 December 1964.
