= Motherland: Tales of Wonder =

1994 Canadian documentary film

- Directed by: Helene Klodawsky
- Produced by: Signe Johansson
- Narrated by: Helene Klodawsky
- Cinematography: Zoe Dirse; Joan Hutton; John Lucas
- Edited by: Sidonie Kerr
- Music by: Kathryn Moses
- Production company: National Film Board of Canada
- Release date: 1994
- Running time: 90 minutes
- Country: Canada
- Language: English

Motherland: Tales of Wonder is a Canadian documentary film, directed by Helene Klodawsky and released in 1994. The film centres on interviews with a variety of women, both older women whose children are now adults and younger women who were still raising young kids at the time the film was made, about the social and cultural pressures attached to motherhood.

The film received a Genie Award nomination for Best Feature Length Documentary at the 16th Genie Awards in 1996.
