= Tamil New Tigers =

Sri Lankan militant organization (1972–76)

- Leader: Velupillai Prabhakaran †
- Dates active: 22 May 1972 – 5 May 1976
- Ideology: Tamil nationalism
- Status: Disbanded

The Tamil New Tigers (TNT) was a Sri Lankan Tamil militant organization founded by Velupillai Prabhakaran on 22 May 1972. The group was composed of a few close associates of Prabhakaran, who was only 17 years old when he founded the group. The group was a predecessor to the Liberation Tigers of Tamil Eelam (LTTE).

Initially, the TNT carried out several small-scale attacks, including the bombing of a carnival at the Duraiappa Stadium in 1972, and several explosions during Prime Minister Sirimavo Bandaranaike's visit to Jaffna in 1974. The group gained notoriety in 1975 when Prabhakaran and three other members assassinated Alfred Duraiappah, the Mayor of Jaffna.

The group continued to carry out attacks and a string of bank robberies after the assassination, and the Sri Lanka Police were issued orders to arrest all members of the group. Wanting to form a guerrilla group, Prabhakaran created the Liberation Tigers of Tamil Eelam on 5 May 1976 and disbanded the Tamil New Tigers.

== See also ==
- Tamil militant groups
- Liberation Tigers of Tamil Eelam
