= Rajan Hoole =

Sri Lankan Tamil academic and human rights activist

- ராஜன் ஹூல்
- Other name: M. R. R. Hoole
- Education: University of Oxford
- Occupation: Academic

Michael Richard Ratnarajan Hoole (commonly known as Rajan Hoole) is a Sri Lankan Tamil mathematician, academic and human rights activist. He was one of the founders of University Teachers for Human Rights (UTHR) which documented human rights abuses during the Sri Lankan Civil War.

== Early life and family ==
Hoole is the son of eldest son of Rev. Richard Herbert Ratnathurai Hoole and Jeevamany Somasundaram. He was educated at Chundikuli Girls' College, St. John's College, Jaffna and S. Thomas' College, Mount Lavinia. After school he joined the University of Ceylon. In 1982 he received a Ph.D in mathematical logic from the University of Oxford.

Hoole is married to Kirupa (Kirubai) Selvadurai, a fellow academic from the University of Jaffna. He is the brother of Ratnajeevan Hoole.

== Career ==
Hoole worked as a lecturer in the Department of Mathematics at the National University of Singapore.

Hoole was amongst three hundred academics who, in 1988, formed the University Teachers for Human Rights (Jaffna) to document and report the increasing number of human rights violations in Sri Lanka's civil war. Following the assassination of Rajini Thiranagama, one of the founders of UTHR(J), in 1989, many members of UTHR(J) left the organisation. Hoole, along with fellow UTHR(J) member Kopalasingham Sritharan, left Jaffna and went into hiding but they continued with their UTHR(J) work, documenting atrocities committed by all sides of the civil war.

Hoole and Sritharan were finalists for the 2005 Civil Courage Prize but ultimately won "Certificates of Distinction in Civil Courage" and a $1,000 cash prize. In 2007 Hoole and Sritharan received the Martin Ennals Award for Human Rights Defenders.

Hoole is currently a senior lecturer at the University of Jaffna's Department of Mathematics and Statistics. He was trained as a classical pianist.

== Works ==
- The Broken Palmyra: The Tamil Crisis in Sri Lanka - an Inside Account (1988, UHarvey Mudd College California) (co-author)
- Sri Lanka: the Arrogance of Power : Myths, Decadence and Murder (2001, University Teachers for Human Rights (Jaffna))
