= D. B. S. Jeyaraj =

Sri Lankan Tamil journalist (1954–2026)

D.B.S. Jeyaraj
- Born: David Buell Sabapathy Jeyaraj; 21 May 1954; Colombo, Ceylon
- Died: 17 May 2026 (aged 71); Toronto, Ontario, Canada
- Citizenship: Canada (from 2004)
- Education: S. Thomas' Preparatory School; Jaffna College
- Occupations: Journalist, political columnist
- Years active: 1977–2026
- Known for: Reporting on the Sri Lankan Civil War and Tamil politics
- Awards: Nieman Fellowship (1988–1989)
- Website: dbsjeyaraj.com

David Buell Sabapathy Jeyaraj (21 May 1954 – 17 May 2026), known as D.B.S. Jeyaraj, was a Sri Lankan Tamil journalist and political columnist who reported on Sri Lanka's civil war and ethnic conflict, first from Colombo and later from exile in Toronto, Canada, where he lived for nearly four decades. He worked for Virakesari, The Island and The Hindu, and later wrote columns for Sri Lankan newspapers and his own website. He was a Nieman Fellow at Harvard University in 1988–1989.

Jeyaraj was known for reporting critically on abuses by both the Sri Lankan state and the Liberation Tigers of Tamil Eelam (LTTE). He was detained by Sri Lankan authorities in 1987 over his coverage of the war between the LTTE and the Indian Peace Keeping Force, and in 1993 he was assaulted in Toronto by four men who broke both of his legs. His work was cited by Human Rights Watch and Amnesty International.

== Early life and family ==
Jeyaraj was born in Colombo on 21 May 1954. He attended S. Thomas' Preparatory School in Colombo and completed his secondary education at Jaffna College in Vaddukoddai.

He was the eldest of four children. His father was a lawyer based in Kurunegala and his mother was a teacher whose ancestral village was Kaddaively in Jaffna. The family were Methodists.

== Career in Sri Lanka ==
Jeyaraj began his career in 1977 at the Tamil-language daily Virakesari. In 1981 he joined the English-language The Island, where he reported on political events in the Northern and Eastern provinces. He wrote a weekly column, "Behind the Cadjan Curtain", for its sister paper, the Sunday Island. He also contributed to the Jaffna-based Saturday Review and served as Colombo correspondent for The Hindu.

=== Black July ===
During the anti-Tamil pogrom of July 1983, Jeyaraj was in Mannar covering a convention of the Tamil United Liberation Front (TULF). His family in Ratmalana hid in a marsh behind their rented house while a mob searched for them, and later sheltered at a refugee camp at Ratmalana Airport. His father and brother each narrowly escaped mob attacks on 29 July 1983. His mother and sisters later relocated to Jaffna.

Jeyaraj returned to Colombo on 4 August 1983, the day Parliament passed the Sixth Amendment rejecting separatism. He resumed writing under his own byline and for a time slept in The Island's editorial offices. He did not write about his family's experience of Black July for nearly four decades, publishing a personal account in the Daily FT in 2023 and a revised version in the Daily Mirror in 2024.

=== 1987 arrest ===
After war broke out between the LTTE and the Indian Peace Keeping Force in October 1987, Jeyaraj obtained documents and photographs showing the conflict's effects on civilians. These were published in a series of articles in the Sunday Island, which included his interview with the LTTE's then deputy leader, Gopalaswamy Mahendraraja ("Mahattaya"). Indian diplomats in Colombo were displeased with the coverage and pressed Sri Lankan officials to arrest and question him. According to an account Jeyaraj published in the Daily Mirror in 2023, as summarised by K.S. Lakshmi in the Jaffna Monitor, he was arrested by the Criminal Investigation Department and held on the fourth floor of the Police Secretariat in Colombo, after Indian High Commissioner J. N. Dixit contacted President J. R. Jayewardene about the interview.

He was detained for five days and released on bail, partly as a result of protests by journalists in Sri Lanka and abroad. Lakshmi's letter credits personal intervention by N. Ram with President Jayewardene, questioning of the president by foreign correspondents at a press conference, and a solidarity campaign in Tamil Nadu. His second cousin, the parliamentarian M. A. Sumanthiran, later recalled that Jeyaraj refused to reveal information about his source, and that Ram flew from Chennai to Colombo to intervene with the government on his behalf. The Attorney General's office later ruled that there was no case against him.

== Exile ==
Jeyaraj left Sri Lanka on 14 September 1988 to take up a Nieman Fellowship at Harvard University, as one of 23 fellows in the class of 1989. Constitutional scholar Neelan Tiruchelvam encouraged him to apply. He had intended to return to Sri Lanka in 1989, but friends in the media, including journalist Richard de Zoysa, advised him to stay away as the situation in the country deteriorated. He went to stay with a cousin in Canada, and after de Zoysa was abducted and murdered in 1990, he decided to remain in Toronto. He became a Canadian citizen in 2004.

Accounts differ on the reasons for his exile. The Nieman Foundation states that friends persuaded him to leave Sri Lanka after LTTE criticism of his work turned into death threats. In a 2026 letter to the Jaffna Monitor responding to a tribute by M. R. Narayan Swamy, K.S. Lakshmi argued, citing Jeyaraj's own 2023 account, that he left because of his detention by the Sri Lankan state under Indian diplomatic pressure, and that LTTE-related persecution came later, after he had settled in Toronto.

=== Manjarie and the 1993 assault ===
In Toronto, Jeyaraj co-founded a Tamil weekly and then started his own independent Tamil weekly, Manjarie (also spelled Muncharie). The paper reported on developments in Sri Lanka and in the Tamil diaspora, and covered LTTE military setbacks with more truthfulness than many other Tamil publications. Jeyaraj received daily threatening telephone calls as a result, reportedly including 37 abusive calls in a single day in November 1995. Pro-LTTE activists pressured the paper's advertisers and distributors, and in one incident removed copies from Tamil-owned shops and thrown them out. The loss of advertising and circulation forced the paper to close in 1995.

In February 1993, Jeyaraj was attacked in a Toronto parking lot by four men who fractured both of his legs with baseball bats. The attack took place after he had attended a film with his wife. Although he gave police information about those responsible, no arrests were made. Lakshmi attributes the attack to LTTE supporters.

=== Later career ===
After Manjarie closed, Jeyaraj continued to write a weekly column and published on his website, dbsjeyaraj.com. From Toronto he wrote for publications including The Sunday Leader, the Daily Mirror, Frontline and The Hindu. He also wrote for the Daily FT and contributed to the BBC Tamil service.

After the civil war ended in 2009, Jeyaraj made his first visit back to Sri Lanka in 2013, 25 years after he had left. According to Jehan Perera, Jeyaraj said he had deliberately avoided politics during that visit so that he could experience the country as an ordinary person, and was struck by the resilience of people rebuilding their lives after the war. He continued writing until shortly before his death.

== Journalism ==
=== Relationship with Neelan Tiruchelvam ===
Jeyaraj described Neelan Tiruchelvam as his friend and political mentor, and credited him with shaping his career. On the morning of 29 July 1999, Jeyaraj spoke with Tiruchelvam by telephone from Toronto for about 50 minutes. Tiruchelvam was killed by a suicide bomber in Colombo roughly half an hour after the call ended. Jeyaraj wrote extensively about Tiruchelvam's life and assassination, including his role in the 1995 devolution proposals drafted with G. L. Peiris.

=== Assassination of Amirthalingam ===
Jeyaraj wrote repeatedly about the assassination of former opposition leader Appapillai Amirthalingam and former Jaffna MP V. Yogeswaran by the LTTE in Colombo on 13 July 1989. His account relied on conversations over several years with people connected to the event, including the surviving eyewitness M. Sivasithamparam, Mangaiyarkkarasi Amirthalingam, Sarojini Yogeswaran and Neelan Tiruchelvam. It described how LTTE operatives cultivated Yogeswaran under the pretext of promoting Tamil unity, and credited police officer Nissanka Thibbotumunuwa with killing all three assassins.

=== Themes ===
Jeyaraj reported on abuses by the Sri Lankan state and by the LTTE, including the LTTE's expulsion of Muslims from the Northern Province of Sri Lanka in 1990 and its killings of Tamil political leaders who favoured negotiated settlements. He reported on and condemned the practice of branding political opponents as traitors in Tamil politics, tracing its use from the era of G. G. Ponnambalam through the TULF to the LTTE. Jeyaraj was himself branded a traitor to the Tamil cause, which Sumanthiran recalled had hurt him more than anything else.

Besides political journalism, Jeyaraj wrote about prominent personalities and about Tamil cinema, including its actors, singers, films and music. Perera recalled Jeyaraj's advice to journalists in Sri Lanka that outside pressure might prevent them from writing everything they wished to, but should never compel them to write something they did not want to write.

== Reception ==
The Nieman Foundation described Jeyaraj as known for careful fact-checking and balanced reporting, which earned him trust across Sri Lankan society, and noted that his work was cited by Human Rights Watch and Amnesty International. Sumanthiran highlighted his close attention to detail and his practice of checking multiple sources, and said that even people who hated Jeyaraj for what he exposed turned to his columns when they wanted to know what had actually happened. Jehan Perera, chair of the National Peace Council, described Jeyaraj as a mentor and said he trusted his writing because it sought balance, including views opposed to his own. Perera credited him with bringing Tamil perspectives on the conflict to readers of the mainstream English-language press across communities. Writing in Groundviews, Pitasanna Shanmugathas credited Jeyaraj's writing with shaping his own views on the ethnic conflict and described him as a model of moral courage in Tamil journalism.

Jeyaraj also had critics. Sachi Sri Kantha, a self-described supporter of the LTTE, wrote on Sangam.org that Jeyaraj was a skilled storyteller but not an academic researcher, as he had published no peer-reviewed research or books. Sri Kantha accused him of focusing criticism on the LTTE while overlooking the activities of Sri Lankan and Indian intelligence agencies, of praising figures such as Lakshman Kadirgamar and Tiruchelvam in inflated terms, and of relying on unnamed sources. He cited as examples a 2005 Sunday Leader column on the Karuna faction and a 1999 Frontline article on a reported LTTE threat to Sonia Gandhi.

== Personal life and death ==
Jeyaraj was a second cousin of M. A. Sumanthiran, whose paternal grandmother was the sister of Jeyaraj's maternal grandmother. He was known within the family as "Rajan anna". He was married. His wife supported the household financially while he devoted himself to journalism.

Jeyaraj died in Toronto on 17 May 2026, aged 71. Tributes included one by M.R. Narayan Swamy in the Jaffna Monitor.

On 12 September 2026, the Sri Lanka Tamil Media Alliance held a commemoration at the Tamil Sangam in Colombo, where a collection of his writings in Tamil was launched. The event was chaired by journalist Ananth Palakidnar, and speakers included Sumanthiran, Perera, Rauff Hakeem, Mano Ganesan and Vijitha Yapa.

== Selected works ==
- "Behind the Cadjan Curtain", weekly column, Sunday Island (1980s)
- "Sonia and the Tigers", Frontline, 3 July 1999
- "Tigers get a taste of their own bitter medicine", The Sunday Leader, 24 July 2005
- "Murder Most Foul: Assassination of Appapillai Amirthalingam", Daily Mirror, 2019 (republished on dbsjeyaraj.com, 2024)
- "My Family's 'Black July' Experience: A Personal Memoir", Daily Mirror, 20 July 2024
