= Helene Klodawsky =

Canadian documentary filmmaker (born 1956)

- Born: 1956 (age 69–70); Toronto, Ontario, Canada
- Education: NSCAD University (Nova Scotia College of Art and Design)
- Occupation: Documentary filmmaker
- Years active: 1984–present
- Known for: No More Tears Sister, Undying Love, Malls R Us, Stolen Time

Helene Klodawsky (born 1956) is a Canadian documentary filmmaker based in Montreal, Quebec. Active since 1984, she is known for feature documentaries exploring social justice, human rights, refugee experience, elder care, labour, and women's lives. Since 1987, her films have been broadcast by major networks including the Canadian Broadcasting Corporation (CBC), PBS, CTV, Channel 4, Canal+, and the Australian Broadcasting Corporation. Her work has been reviewed in The Globe and Mail, The New York Times, Variety, La Presse, Le Devoir, and Artforum, and has screened at festivals internationally. She is a member of the Writers Guild of Canada, Doc Organization, and Réalisatrices Équitables.

== Early life and education ==
Klodawsky was born in Toronto, Ontario in 1956. Her parents, Bluma Klodawski and Anzsel Klodawski, originally from Łódź, Poland, were Holocaust survivors. She is a graduate of the Nova Scotia College of Art and Design in Halifax, Nova Scotia.

== Career ==
Klodawsky began making films in the mid-1980s. Her early work includes Painted Landscapes of the Times: The Art of Sue Coe (1986) and Shoot and Cry (1988), a documentary about a young Israeli conscript in the occupied territories, which marked her first engagement with the Middle East. Her 1994 feature Motherland: Tales of Wonder was produced with the National Film Board of Canada.

Her feature documentaries have been produced primarily in association with the National Film Board of Canada, Intuitive Pictures and Catbird Films, and have aired on the CBC's Documentary Channel, Superchannel and on PBS's long-running documentary strand POV. Several of her films have been programmed at institutions including the Museum of Modern Art in New York.

== Films ==
=== Stolen Time (2023) ===
Stolen Time follows elder rights lawyer Melissa Miller as she builds legal cases against the long-term care industry on behalf of hundreds of aggrieved families, challenging major for-profit nursing-home corporations over neglect and abuse of elderly residents. The film had its theatrical release in March 2024 following a national tour. Writing in Stir, critic Adrian Mack described the film as a chilling documentary that measures a society by the compassion it extends to its most vulnerable. POV Magazine called the film an investigation of institutional ageism. SEE Change Magazine featured Klodawsky and Miller in a profile on the film's examination of neglect in for-profit care homes.

The film received the Humanitarian Award and Award of Excellence at the Accolade Global Film Competition (2024), and the Documentary Feature Award and Viewer Impact Award at the Impact DOCS Awards (2024).

=== No More Tears Sister: Anatomy of Hope and Betrayal (2004) ===
No More Tears Sister tells the story of Dr. Rajani Thiranagama, a Sri Lankan human rights activist, anatomy professor, author, and mother who was assassinated in Jaffna at age 35 during the Sri Lankan Civil War. The film draws on archival footage, personal correspondence, and dramatic recreations to recount her commitment to documenting abuses committed by all parties to the conflict, including the Liberation Tigers of Tamil Eelam.

The film received its US premiere on PBS's POV strand on June 27, 2006. The New York Times published two reviews at the time of the PBS broadcast. The Globe and Mail described the film as putting a human face on the Tiger tragedy.

The film received the Spirit of Freedom Award for Best Documentary at the Jerusalem Film Festival (2006), was nominated for Best Political Documentary at the Academy of Canadian Cinema and Television, and won Best Cinematography at the Gemini Awards (2006).

=== Undying Love (2002) ===
Undying Love examines the love stories of World War II survivors — primarily Holocaust survivors — as they rebuilt their lives in post-war Europe, drawing on personal testimony ranging from love at first sight to arranged marriage. Writing in Variety, critic Robert Koehler noted that the filmmaker, herself a daughter of a Holocaust survivor, had assembled several testimonials covering a wide emotional range.

The documentary won Best Feature Documentary at the Warsaw Jewish Film Festival (2003), received the Gemini Award for Best Television History Documentary in Canada (2003), and won Best Documentary Screenplay from the Writers Guild of Canada (2004).

=== Malls R Us (2009) ===
Malls R Us examines the global shopping mall phenomenon through interviews with developers, architects, labour organizers, environmentalists, and shoppers across Canada, the United States, Europe, India, Dubai, and Japan. Writing in Artforum, Brian Sholis discussed the film's treatment of mall culture as a lens on consumer society. The New York Times cited the film in its coverage of the fate of the American mall.

The film was nominated for Best Documentary by the Directors Guild of Canada (2009) and Best Documentary Screenplay by the Writers Guild of Canada (2010). It was named one of 15 Notable Films of 2010 by the American Library Association.

=== Family Motel (2007) ===
Family Motel follows a Somalian refugee mother and her teenage daughters after they are evicted from their apartment and placed in a motel shelter for the homeless in Montreal. The Globe and Mail reviewed the film on its broadcast, noting the dignified portrait of a family navigating homelessness and displacement.

The film won the Prize for the Promotion of Tolerance Through Film at the Rendez-vous du cinéma québécois (2008) and was a drama finalist at the International Festival of Audiovisual Programs (FIPA) in Biarritz, France, where it was among the most-discussed works of the festival's documentary programme.

=== Come Worry With Us! (2013) ===
Come Worry With Us! documents the Montreal post-rock band Thee Silver Mt. Zion Memorial Orchestra — specifically band members Efrim Menuck and Jessica Moss — as they navigate touring, artistic life, and parenthood after the birth of their son. The film explores the economic precarity of independent musicians and the particular challenges for women and parents in the music industry. Reviewing the film at Hot Docs 2014, That Shelf described it as a keenly observant and universally relatable story of loving parents trying to do right by their newborn while sustaining their artistic work. Writing in Rabble.ca, the film was described as a call to nurture, art, and motherhood.

=== Grassroots in Dry Lands (2015) ===
Grassroots in Dry Lands profiles a network of social workers applying a community development methodology pioneered at McGill University's School of Social Work to low-income neighbourhoods in Israel, the Palestinian territories, and Jordan. The film returned Klodawsky to the Middle East, a region she had first documented in Shoot and Cry (1988). It was broadcast on the Documentary Channel.

=== From Janet With Love (2017) ===
From Janet With Love is an interactive new media documentary portrait of Janet, an immigrant caregiver from the Philippines living in Montreal, and the network of correspondence and community she built across continents. The project was produced with the National Film Board of Canada as part of its Legacies 150 series. The National Post covered the film's portrait of a pen-pal caregiver from the Philippines.

The project won Second Prize in Innovative Digital Storytelling at the World Press Photo Festival (2018) and was featured in the World Press Photo Travelling Exhibition's 100-city global tour.

== Filmography ==
=== Feature documentaries ===
Year	Title	Notes
1994	Motherland: Tales of Wonder	
2002	Undying Love	
2004	No More Tears Sister	
2007	Family Motel	
2009	Malls R Us	
2013	Come Worry With Us!	
2015	Grassroots in Dry Lands	
2023	Stolen Time	

=== Other works ===
Year	Title	Notes
1986	Love's Labour	
1986	Painted Landscapes of the Times: The Art of Sue Coe	
1988	Shoot and Cry	
1991	No Time to Stop	
1998	What If... A Film About Judith Merril	
1909	Hire Learning	
2000	In Search of Lucille	
2017	From Janet With Love	
2019	The Invisible Everywhere	

== Awards and recognition ==
Year	Award	Category	Film	Result	Ref
1996	Genie Awards	Best Feature Length Documentary	Motherland: Tales of Wonder	Nominated	
2003	Warsaw Jewish Film Festival	Best Feature Documentary	Undying Love	Won	
2004	Writers Guild of Canada	Best Documentary Screenplay	Undying Love	Won	
2006	Jerusalem Film Festival	Spirit of Freedom Award, Best Documentary	No More Tears Sister	Won	
2008	Rendez-vous du cinéma québécois	Prize for Promotion of Tolerance Through Film	Family Motel	Won	
2009	Directors Guild of Canada	DGC Allan King Award for Best Documentary Film	Malls R Us	Nominated	
2010	American Library Association	Notable Film	Malls R Us	Won	
2010	Writers Guild of Canada	Best Documentary Screenplay (nomination)	Malls R Us	Nominated	
2018	World Press Photo Festival	Second Prize, Innovative Digital Storytelling	From Janet With Love	Won	
2024	Accolade Global Film Competition	Humanitarian Award	Stolen Time	Won	
2024	Accolade Global Film Competition	Award of Excellence	Stolen Time	Won	
2024	Impact DOCS Awards	Documentary Feature Award	Stolen Time	Won	
2024	Impact DOCS Awards	Viewer Impact Award	Stolen Time	Won	
2025	YWCA Y des femmes Montréal — Prix Femmes de mérite	Media and Communications	Career	Won	
