= No More Tears Sister =

- Film poster
- Directed by: Helene Klodawsky
- Written by: Helene Klodawsky
- Produced by: Yves Bisaillon; Pierre Lapointe
- Cinematography: François Dagenais
- Edited by: Patricia Tassinari
- Music by: Bertrand Chénier
- Production company: National Film Board of Canada
- Release date: 2005
- Running time: 78 minutes
- Country: Canada
- Language: English

No More Tears Sister is a 2005 documentary film about the leftist revolutionary Rajini Thiranagama who joined the guerrilla group the Tamil Tigers . Thiranagama ultimately left the group, however, when she realized it was more a murderous group than a revolutionary force. She was assassinated on September 21, 1989, when she was only 35.

No More Tears Sister was written and directed by Helene Klodawsky and was the season premiere for the 19th season of the PBS Point of View series in 2006.

François Dagenais won the Gemini Award for Best Photography in a Documentary Program or Series, and the film was a nominee for the Donald Brittain Award, at the 21st Gemini Awards in 2006.

With so little documentary footage available, the film makes extensive use of dramatic recreations.
