= 1974 Tamil conference incident =

Attack by Sri Lankan police on research conference

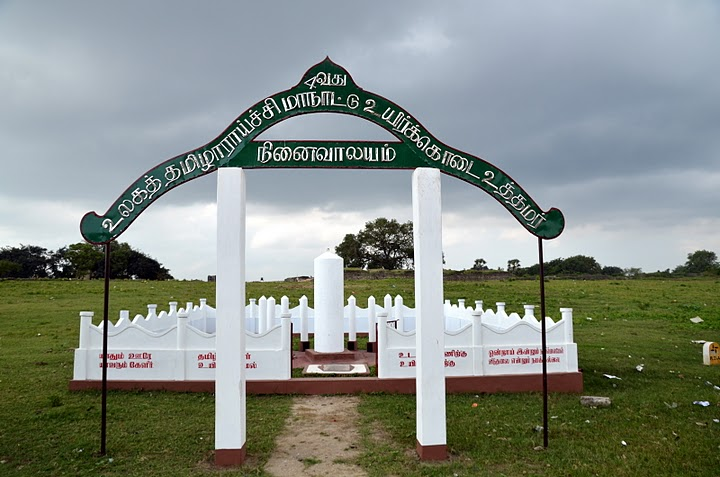
- Memorial for those who died in the 1974 Tamil conference incident

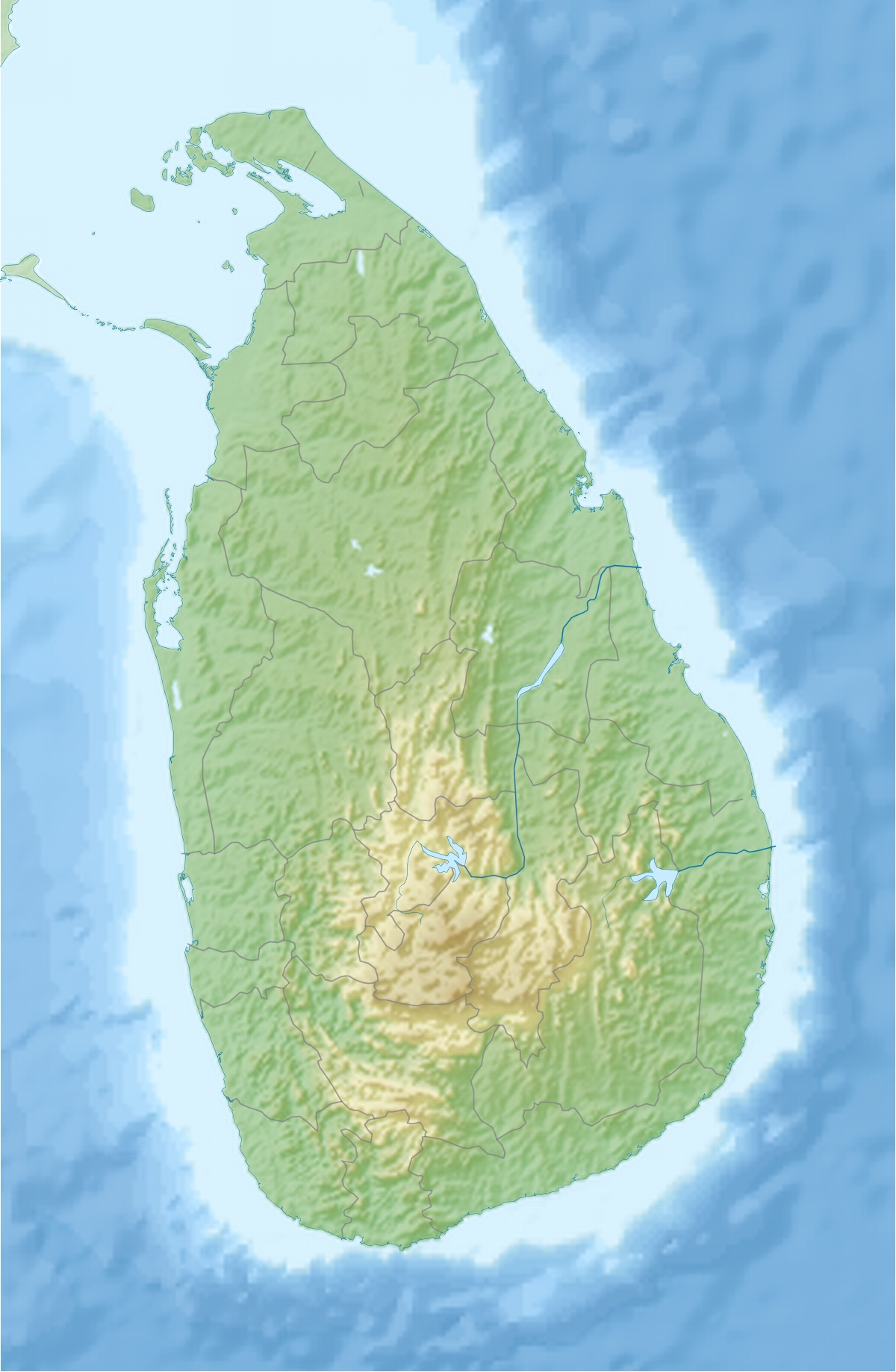
- Location: 9°40′N 80°00′E; Jaffna, Sri Lanka
- Date: 10 January 1974 (+6 GMT)
- Target: Sri Lankan Tamils
- Attack type: Electrocution
- Weapon: Guns
- Deaths: 9 or 11
- Injuries: 50
- Perpetrator: Sri Lankan Police

The 1974 Tamil conference incident occurred during the fourth World Tamil Research Conference, which was held in the city of Jaffna between 3 and 9 January 1974. Sri Lankan Police disrupted the meeting with force, killing nine or eleven people, and resulting in substantial civilian property damage and more than 50 civilians sustaining severe injuries.

== Early conflict ==
The SLFP-dominated government of Sirimavo Bandaranaike had requested that the conference be held in the capital Colombo but the conference organizers held it in the Tamil-dominant city of Jaffna.

On 10 January the organisers decided to hold a public meeting to distribute awards to those who had participated in the cultural program. The audience, more than 10,000 in number, spanned the road and overflowed into open expanses.

== The incident ==
Assistant Superintendent of Police Chandrasekera, led a truckload of anti-riot police of more than 40 to the scene. Their unheralded arrival ended in the chaotic disruption of the ceremony.

The police had been advancing slowly through the crowd in jeep and truck wearing steel helmets, ordering the crowd to move. At the time Professor Naina Mohamed, a distinguished Tamil scholar from Tamil Nadu, India, was speaking and the crowd was heavily packed, such that the police could proceed no further. Then the policemen who were armed with rifles, tear-gas bombs, batons and wicker shields started attacking those who stood in their way. The result was a stampede to escape the police attack, as policemen fanned out in all directions assaulting all and sundry. Some even jumped into the moat beside the Fort to escape the attack.

The overhead electric wires were brought down by gunshots. A policeman was seen throwing a tear-gas bomb which did not explode, and then firing at the electric wire, resulting in a burning coil falling on him. The foreign delegates who attended the conference had also confirmed that the police had fired into the air.

Seven civilians died of electrocution. Several others sustained severe injuries due to the police charging at them.

== The government response ==
The police officers involved were subsequently promoted instead of being reprimanded by the government.

The report of the Commission of Inquiry on the Tragedy of January Tenth 1974 published on 18 February 1974 said,

"The irresistible conclusion we come to is that the police on this night (10 January 1974) was guilty of a violent and quite an unnecessary attack on unarmed citizens. "We are gravely concerned that they lacked the judgment which we expected of policemen in a civilian police force whose duties call for tactful handling even in the most difficult situation.”

== Legacy ==
Appapillai Amirthalingam stated

"the refusal of the government to appoint a Presidential Commission to inquire into the seven deaths and the conduct of the Police which led to those deaths, was a prime cause of the demand for a separate state."

This incident was the precursor to the revenge killing of the SLFP mayor of Jaffna, Alfred Duraiappah by the LTTE which began the era of Tamil militancy amongst the youth leading up to the Sri Lankan Civil War.

== See also ==
- List of attacks attributed to Sri Lankan government forces
- List of attacks attributed to the LTTE
- List of massacres in Sri Lanka
