= K. Kanagaratnam =

Ceylon Tamil politician (1892–1962)

Hon. K. Kanagaratnam MP
- க. கனகரத்தினம்
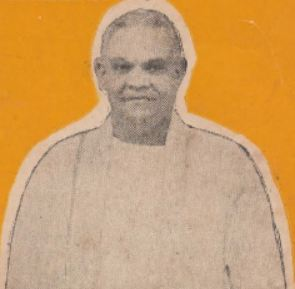

Member of the Ceylonese Parliament for Vaddukoddai
- In office 1947–1952
- Succeeded by: V. Veerasingam

Personal details
- Born: 28 July 1892
- Died: 3 October 1962 (aged 70)
- Party: All Ceylon Tamil Congress
- Profession: Civil servant
- Ethnicity: Ceylon Tamil

Kandiah Kanagaratnam (Tamil: கந்தையா கனகரத்தினம்; 28 July 1892 – 3 October 1962) was a Ceylon Tamil civil servant, politician, Member of Parliament and Parliamentary Secretary.

== Early life ==
Kanagaratnam was born on 28 July 1892. He was the son of Kandiah from Vaddukoddai in northern Ceylon.

== Career ==
Kanagaratnam joined the Government Clerical Service in 1911. He became Chief Audit Examiner in 1925. He was later Deputy Auditor General and Acting Auditor General.

Kanagaratnam contested the 1947 parliamentary election as the All Ceylon Tamil Congress' (ACTC) candidate in Vaddukoddai. He won the election and entered Parliament. The ACTC joined the United National Party led government on 3 September 1948 and Kanagaratnam was appointed Parliamentary Secretary to the Minister of Education.

Kanagaratnam stood for re-election at the 1952 parliamentary election but was defeated by independent candidate V. Veerasingam.
