= Kagusthan Ariaratnam =

Canadian author and former child soldier

- Born: August 23, 1973 (age 53); Jaffna, Sri Lanka
- Citizenship: Canada
- Education: University of Ottawa (BA Honours in Communication)
- Occupation: Author
- Known for: Spy Tiger: The 05 File

Kagusthan Ariaratnam (born August 23, 1973; Tamil: காகுஸ்தன் அரியரத்தினம்) is a Canadian author and former child soldier who served with the Liberation Tigers of Tamil Eelam (LTTE) during the Sri Lankan Civil War. He co-authored the 2024 memoir Spy Tiger: The 05 File with journalist Michael Bramadat-Willcock. He is a complainant in a discrimination case against the Canadian Security Intelligence Service.

== Early life and education ==
Ariaratnam was born in Jaffna, Sri Lanka. In 1991, he was abducted by the LTTE while studying mathematics at Kokkuvil Hindu College. He was held in an underground bunker and forcibly recruited as a child soldier. He later worked in the LTTE's intelligence wing.

In June 1995, the LTTE published wanted notices with Ariaratnam's photograph seeking information about his whereabouts in Tamil newspapers. The newspaper articles are preserved in the Noolaham Foundation digital archive.

Ariaratnam immigrated to Canada in 1997 and was granted refugee protection in 1998. He became a Canadian citizen in 2009. He studied Communication and Media Studies at the University of Ottawa. In 2026, Ariaratnam received an Honours Bachelor of Arts (Cum Laude) in Communications from the University of Ottawa.

== Career ==
Ariaratnam worked in intelligence operations for the LTTE. He later provided intelligence information to the Canadian Security Intelligence Service. After moving to Canada, he worked as a security professional with many security firms

Ariaratnam, known within the LTTE by his nom de guerre "Oppilan," was one of four teenage cadres who interrogated captured Sri Lankan naval officer Commodore Ajith Boyagoda during his early captivity, leading daily questioning sessions on naval matters. Decades later, calling himself "Murali," Ariaratnam contacted Boyagoda from Canada and described having worked simultaneously for LTTE intelligence, India's RAW, and later Sri Lankan military intelligence.

=== Spy Tiger: The 05 File ===
In 2024, Ariaratnam co-authored the memoir Spy Tiger: The 05 File with journalist Michael Bramadat-Willcock. The book describes his experiences during the Sri Lankan Civil War.

The book was reviewed in the CLAWS Journal, published by India's Centre for Land Warfare Studies. Reviewer Aritra Banerjee wrote that the book provides "invaluable insights into the functioning of one of the most well trained insurgent groups in the world."

Anish Kumar, reviewing the book for Asianet Newsable, wrote that it "does not romanticise his role; instead, it offers a grounded portrayal of what it means to serve one's country from the shadows, often at the expense of personal peace."

Natasha Fernando of the South Asia Democratic Forum recommended the book "as a valuable source for military schools, training establishments of security forces and security practitioners worldwide due to its insider accounts of both non-state and state security operations."

Oneindia Staff called Ariaratnam's writing "sharp and cinematic," praising the memoir's ability to humanize a figure "often seen in fiction."

In an interview with JURIST, Ariaratnam said writing the memoir helped him confront painful memories and manage his mental health.

=== Project O Five ===
In 2015, Ariaratnam founded Project O Five, an Ottawa-based non-profit organization. The organization focuses on global peace and security through the use of "smart power," combining elements of hard and soft power in addressing issues such as terrorism, radicalization, and systemic inequality.

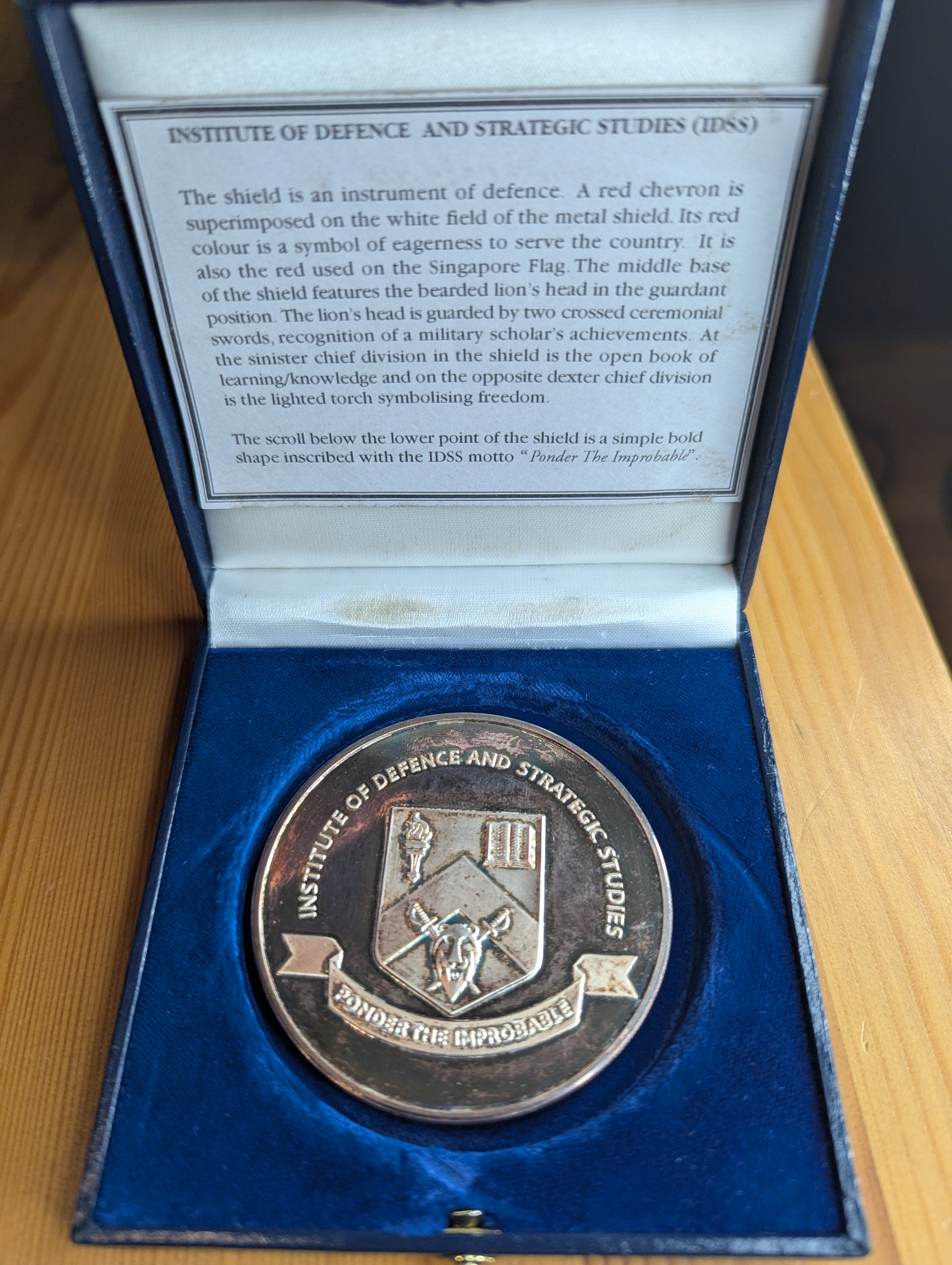
A token of appreciation from Institute of Defence and Strategic Studies

The organization also provides consulting services in areas such as security risk analysis, counterterrorism strategies, and threat forecasting for public and private sector stakeholders. In recognition of his contribution to the Global War on Terrorism, Ariaratnam received the Institute of Defence and Strategic Studies Award at the Nanyang Technological University in October 2003.

== Legal proceedings ==
In 2016, Ariaratnam applied for a position with the Parliamentary Protective Service. His site access clearance application was cancelled after CSIS shared classified documents about his mental health with House of Commons officials.

Ariaratnam filed a complaint with the Canadian Human Rights Commission in January 2018. The complaint alleged discrimination based on disability and national or ethnic origin. He also filed a complaint with the National Security and Intelligence Review Agency (NSIRA) in 2017. NSIRA's 2020 report found that CSIS had shared Ariaratnam's mental health information with House of Commons officials.

The Canadian Human Rights Commission dismissed his complaint in 2022. The Federal Court set aside this decision in September 2023. The court found that Ariaratnam had not known about the information sharing before the NSIRA hearing.

The complaint took more than six years to reach the Canadian Human Rights Tribunal. After Ariaratnam filed detailed allegations in February 2025, CSIS requested that the government invoke national security provisions to transfer the case to NSIRA. The Canadian Human Rights Commission supported this request.

In November 2025, the Canadian Human Rights Tribunal ruled that it retained jurisdiction over the complaint. Tribunal Member Ashley Bressette-Martinez wrote that "the power to withdraw a complaint before the Tribunal belongs to a complainant and no other party has that power." The tribunal declined to pause the proceedings. Ariaratnam's lawyer, Nicholas Pope, said the decision "limits the use of NSIRA as a tool to delay human rights proceedings."

== Bibliography ==
- Ariaratnam, Kagusthan; Bramadat-Willcock, Michael (2024). Spy Tiger: The 05 File. Self Publishers. ISBN 978-1965384169.
