= University Teachers for Human Rights (Jaffna) =

The University Teachers for Human Rights (Jaffna) or UTHR(J) was a Sri Lankan human rights organization. It was formed in 1988 to document human rights violations by all parties during the Sri Lankan civil war. As a Tamil group, its criticism was especially aimed at Tamil nationalism as represented by the LTTE.

== History ==
UTHR(J) was formed in 1988 at the University of Jaffna, Jaffna, in Sri Lanka, as part of the national organization University Teachers for Human Rights. Its key founder was left-wing activist and physician Rajani Thiranagama. Other co-founders were mathematicians Rajan Hoole and Kopalasingham Sritharan. None of them had a formal training in human rights.

Its public activities as a constituent part of university life came to a standstill after the assassination on September 21, 1989 of Rajani Thiranagama, a key founding member, for which the group blamed the LTTE.

In 1990, the others who identified openly with the UTHR(J), such as its current head, Professor Rajan Hoole, were forced to leave Jaffna. Rajan Hoole lived in hiding in Colombo and permanently resettled in Jaffna only after the war ended.

UTHR(J) increased its activities in the 1990s. By 1996, Western coverage of the conflict was increasingly influenced by its reports.

By the beginning of 2010 the UTHR(J) had ceased to operate following the defeat of the LTTE.

=== TRO abductions controversy ===
In April 2006, echoing the Sri Lankan government's allegations, the UTHR released a report accusing the LTTE of having staged the abduction of seven TRO employees in order to implicate the pro-government TMVP and force the paramilitary issue to the forefront of the upcoming Geneva talks. The LTTE's political head of the eastern province denied the report as baseless and stated that they did not respect the UTHR. The TRO spokesperson also condemned the report, slamming the group as unreliable with a notoriety for making "ridiculous statements", and contemplated legal action against it. It was later revealed that the TRO employees had in fact been abducted and murdered by the TMVP. The UTHR later issued a correction in March 2007 admitting they were wrong.

== Ideology ==
The UTHR(J) stated its members had various ideological perspectives, including Marxism and theology. Scholar Ravi Vaitheespara described the group's perspective as representing the "self-righteous liberal indignation" of "the old Tamil ruling and professional classes of Jaffna and Colombo".

The UTHR(J) functioned as an organization to uphold its professed aim: "to challenge the external and internal terror engulfing the Tamil community as a whole through making the perpetrators accountable, and to create space for humanising the social and political spheres relating to the life of our community." Among its long-held ideals was that "the due rights of the minorities, taking into account Sinhalese concerns, could ideally be met in a united Sri Lanka under federalism."

Professor Peter Schalk, who has written extensively on subjects related to Tamil Eelam, described the UTHR(J) as having "established a solid reputation of being anti-LTTE". The New York Times described the group as "stridently anti-rebel".

== Reception ==
The UTHR(J) has been described as a well-respected human rights organization. Its documentation and commentary were used domestically and internationally. In Sri Lanka, the group was better received by the Sinhalese than the Tamils.

Due to government censorship of the war, the UTHR(J) became the main source of information on the war zones for foreign governments, NGOs and the media. In 2001, Sri Lankan President Chandrika Kumaratunga claimed UTHR(J) had appreciated her human rights record when asked about the allegations of human rights abuses against Tamils under her government. UTHR(J) rejected her framing of its reporting. (Note: In a response to Kumaratunga's comment, it stated that her invocation of UTHR "to whitewash her government’s human rights record is a cynical appropriation of our voice.")

In 2007 Rajan Hoole and Kopalasingham Sritharan, co-founders of the group, received the Martin Ennals Award for Human Rights Defenders. The award was granted because of the group's "groundbreaking investigations" into massacres that had lately taken place.

=== Criticism ===
The UTHR(J) has also come under criticism from certain quarters. Brian Senewiratne, a Sinhalese advocate of Tamil Eelam who had written the foreword to the group's book "The Broken Palmyra", alleged that the group "has changed to simply being virulently anti-LTTE," and that the Sri Lankan government was using its reports to cover up human rights violations. The University of Jaffna, where the UTHR(J) was formed, has repeatedly disclaimed any connection with the group and published a letter in 1996 dismissing its reports on the LTTE as being "based on hearsay". Tamil diaspora activists and organizations have also accused the UTHR(J) of having an anti-LTTE bias and of praising Sri Lankan Army officers involved in human rights abuses. Among scholarly critiques, the UTHR(J) has also been criticized for the use of "fascist" as a pejorative being exclusively reserved for the LTTE, which is described as "sensationalist characterization" without any theoretical basis.

== See also ==
- Human Rights in Sri Lanka
