= Rajani Thiranagama =

Human rights activist

Dr. Rajani Thiranagama
- Born: 23 February 1954; Jaffna, Sri Lanka
- Died: 21 September 1989 (aged 35); Jaffna, Sri Lanka
- Cause of death: Gunshot wounds
- Occupation: University lecturer
- Spouse: Dayapala Thiranagama
- Children: 2, including Sharika Thiranagama

Rajani Thiranagama (née Rajasingham) (23 February 1954 – 21 September 1989) was a Sri Lankan Tamil human rights activist and feminist who was assassinated by the LTTE cadres after she had criticised them for their atrocities. At the time of her assassination, she was the head of the Department of Anatomy at the University of Jaffna and an active member and one of the founders of University Teachers for Human Rights, Jaffna.

== Biography ==
=== Early life and education ===
Rajani was born in Jaffna, in northern Sri Lanka, to middle-class Tamil Christian parents. She was the second of four female children. She attended primary and secondary school in Jaffna, and in 1973, she entered the University of Colombo to study medicine. In university, she became actively involved in student politics.

=== Marriage and children ===
During her stay at Colombo University she met a politically active student leader from Kelaniya University named Dayapala Thiranagama. Dayapala was from a rural Sinhala Buddhist background. Rajani broke ethnic and religious barriers and married Dayapala in 1977. They had two daughters: Narmada (1978) and Sharika, 1980. Narmada now lives in Britain and works for the public sector union UNISON. Political Anthropologist Sharika Thiranagama currently teaches at Stanford University, and is married to fellow anthropologist Thomas Blom Hansen. In 2005, Sharika portrayed the role of her mother in a documentary film on Rajani, No More Tears Sister.

=== Medical profession ===
In 1978, Rajani began her first posting as an intern medical doctor at the Jaffna Hospital. After the completion of the internship in 1979, she travelled to Haldumulla, a small village near Haputale, to work as a medical doctor. By 1980 she had returned to Jaffna as a lecturer in anatomy at the newly formed Faculty of Medicine at the University of Jaffna. By then, Jaffna was a battle zone and in the early stages of the Sri Lankan Civil War. Many were leaving Jaffna for Colombo or migrating to other countries, including the United Kingdom, Canada, and Australia.

=== Links with LTTE ===
Inspired by her elder sister Nirmala, then a member of Liberation Tigers of Tamil Eelam, Rajani became involved with the LTTE by administering care to those wounded in action. In 1983, Rajani travelled to England under Commonwealth scholarship for postgraduate studies in anatomy at the Liverpool Medical School. There, she launched a major international campaign for the release of her sister, who was imprisoned in 1982 under Sri Lanka's Prevention of Terrorism Act. She also maintained her links with LTTE by joining its London Committee to educate human rights groups and other international organisations about the atrocities occurring in Sri Lanka. While continuing to write and publish scientific papers, she also became implicated in grassroots organisations fighting for women's rights and against the discrimination of Britain's black people and became involved in the international campaigns of other liberation groups.

=== Human rights activist ===
Over time, constant exposure to politically motivated killings by armed groups on all sides caused Rajani to rethink her position on armed struggle. A determined idealist, she criticised the narrow nationalism of the LTTE and the atrocities committed by the LTTE, the Indian Peace Keeping Force and the Sri Lankan government forces upon the innocent Tamil civilian population in Jaffna. She began to collect evidence of human rights violations of the Indian Peace Keeping Force and the LTTE. At the University of Jaffna, Rajani and some of her teacher colleagues founded the Jaffna branch of the University Teachers for Human Rights.

Having witnessed the evidence of human rights violations by the IPKF and the LTTE, Rajani co-authored a book, The Broken Palmyra. The book documents the violence in Jaffna in the 1980s.

== Death ==
A few weeks after the publication of her book The Broken Palmyra, on 21 September 1989, Rajani was shot and killed at Thirunelvely, Jaffna in front of her house by a gunman while cycling back from work. The UTHR(J) and Rajani's sister accuse the LTTE of her murder as retaliation against her criticism of its violent tactics. However, the Tamil weekly Thinamurasu published an article in 1998 blaming the pro-Indian EPRLF for the killing, alleging that a former EPRLF member who had been directly involved in the killing confessed to having carried it out on the order of IPKF Colonel Sasikumar. Though there has been dispute over the identity of her killers, her daughters have identified them as LTTE members.

== Legacy and memorials ==
=== Documentary film ===
In a documentary released worldwide in 2005, No More Tears Sister, produced by the National Film Board (NFB) of Canada, Rajani's life and legacy are brought to life. This film is available in free streaming on the site of the NFB. The film is written and directed by Helene Klodawsky with François Dagenais as its cinematographer. It runs for 80 min, 15 sec.

=== Book ===
The Malayalam novel Sugandhi Enna Aandal Devanayaki, by the author T. D. Ramakrishnan, portrayed the life and times of Rajani. The author even paid tribute to Rajani by dedicating the novel to her and quoting No More Tears Sister.

Rajani is also acknowledged as being the inspiration for the character Anjali Acca in the novel Brotherless Night by the author V. V. Ganeshananthan, which won the Women’s Prize for Fiction in 2024.

=== Quotes ===
Embracing feminism and a belief in human rights, Rajani felt that women in particular were the primary casualties of war:

Men in battle garb, whether they come with swords or guns, on a horse or in armored cars, the price of conquest seems heightened by the violation of women,

One day some gun will silence me and it will not be held by an outsider but by the son born in the womb of this very society, from a woman with whom my history is shared

wrote Rajani in 1989, a few months before she was killed.

== See also ==
- Sri Lankan Civil War
