= Sri Lankan Tamil militant groups =

Overview of Tamil Eelam independence groups

Sri Lankan Tamil militant groups rose to prominence in the 1970s to fight the state of Sri Lanka in order to create an independent Tamil Eelam in the north of Sri Lanka. They rose in response to the perception among minority Sri Lankan Tamils that the state was preferring the majority Sinhalese for educational opportunities and government jobs. By the end of 1987, the militants had fought not only the Sri Lankan security forces but also the Indian Peace Keeping Force. They also fought among each other briefly, with the main Liberation Tigers of Tamil Eelam (LTTE) rebel group dominating the others. The militants represented inter-generational tensions, as well as the caste and ideological differences. Except for the LTTE, many of the remaining organizations have morphed into minor political parties within the Tamil National Alliance, or as standalone political parties. Some Tamil militant groups also functioned as paramilitaries within the Sri Lankan military against separatist militants .

== Origins ==
The relationship between the Sinhalese and Tamils was not always antagonistic, but after 1948, when Sri Lanka became independent, successive governments have adopted policies that had the effect of net preference to the majority Sinhalese at the expense of the minority Sri Lankan Tamils such as the Sinhala Only Act. The governments adopted these policies in order to assist the Sinhalese community in such areas as education and public employment. These policies severely curtailed the middle class Tamil youth, who found it more difficult during the 1970s and 1980s to enter a university or secure employment. These individuals belonging to this younger generation, often referred to by other Tamils as "the boys" (Podiyal in Tamil language) formed many militant organizations. When the government launched plans to settle poor farmers in the sparsely populated areas of the dry zone in the North Central Province and the Eastern Provinces alongside irrigation projects the Sinhalese nationalist groups viewed it as a "reclamation and recreation in the present of the glorious Sinhalese Buddhist past" resulting in many Tamils viewing it as a deliberate attempt of the Sinhalese-dominated state to marginalize them further by decreasing their numbers in the area.

== Social conditions ==
The militant groups also represented not only a revolt against the Sinhalese-dominated status quo but also an expression of inter-generational tensions in a highly traditional society where obedience to parental authority was expected. Militant youth criticized their elders for indecisiveness at a time when they felt the existence of their ethnic community clearly was in danger.

The most important contributor to the strength of the militant groups was the Black July pogrom which was perceived as an organized event in which over 3000 Sri Lankan Tamil civilians were slaughtered by Sinhalese mobs, prompting many youth to prefer the armed path of resistance.

The movement also reflected caste differences and rivalries. The membership of the largest and most important rebel group, for example, the Liberation Tigers of Tamil Eelam (LTTE), was generally drawn from the Karaiyar or fisherman caste, while individuals belonging to the Vellala or farmer caste were found in considerable numbers in a rival group, the People's Liberation Organization of Tamil Eelam (PLOTE).

== Role in the conflict ==
By the end of 1987, they had fought not only the Sri Lankan security forces but also the Indian Peace Keeping Force and were allegedly involved in acts that were characterized as terrorism against civilians. They also fought among each other briefly, with main Liberation Tigers of Tamil Eelam (LTTE) rebel group dominating the others. Most of the Tamil militant groups were eliminated by the LTTE.

== Groups ==
Student organizations

Most started as student organizations. A notable one was Tamil Students League (TSL) or Tamil Manavar Peravai, founded in 1970 by Ponnuthurai Satyaseelan. Another one was Tamil Youth League or Tamil Ilaignar Peravai founded in 1973, that was progenitor of many militant groups. Finally General Union of Eelam Students (GUES) founded in London, UK whose members founded Eelam Revolutionary Organisation of Students which in turn split into Eelam People's Revolutionary Liberation Front that gave birth to current political party and sometime paramilitary organization Eelam People's Democratic Party.

Major groups

Prior to 1987, the major groups included the Indian trained and equipped Tamil Eelam Liberation Organization, eventually militarily beaten by the LTTE, but politically part of pro-LTTE Tamil National Alliance party, as well as a former rival and splinter group from LTTE, the People's Liberation Organisation of Tamil Eelam, currently a minor standalone political party with many of its cadres working as paramilitaries, although the PLOTE leadership denies this. Among the many leftists groups, the major one was the pro-Indian and Marxist Eelam People's Revolutionary Liberation Front, militarily defeated by the LTTE but a faction of which is part of the TNA and others working with the Sri Lankan government as paramilitaries. The Eelam People's Democratic Party is a pro-government group and a political party accused of being a paramilitary. A faction of the Eelam Revolutionary Organisers (EROS) is part of LTTE. Liberation Tigers of Tamil Eelam (LTTe) is the only remaining armed Tamil nationalist group.

Other groups

There were over 30 other minor groups. Some of the more notable ones included the National Liberation Front of Tamil Eelam (NLFTE), which according to Taraki Sivaram, was a small but influential Maoist group based largely in Jaffna, which

"drove down the road to perdition by splitting hairs over the question of whether it should first build an armed wing or a mass political movement".

People's Liberation Army (PLA) in reality the military wing of EPRLF, Led by EPDP founder and leader Douglas Devananda. An important achievement of the PLA was the 1984 kidnapping of American couple Stanley and Mary Allen from Columbus, Ohio, in Jaffna. Another minor but notable group was the Tamil Eelam Army (TEA) of Panagoda Maheswaran involved in the attack against an Air Lanka flight in Madras, India. Tamil Eelam Liberation Army (TELA) was founded in 1982 by Oberoi Thevan; a splinter group of TELO. After the assassination of Thevan in 1983 by the LTTE, TELA was absorbed by PLOTE.

Militant fronts

There are also number of militia groups such as Upsurging People's Force, Ellalan Padai, and Ravanan Padai considered by some to be groups allied to the LTTE.

== Tamil paramilitary groups ==
Due to the internecine conflicts as well as due to internal conflicts within militant organizations, many members of Tamil militant groups cooperated with the Sri Lankan government and have worked as paramilitary groups. They played an important role in military operations against the LTTE as well as in counter insurgency operations. Tamil Makkal Viduthalai Pulikal, a splinter group from the LTTE, worked with the government. Its former leader, Karuna Amman, was incarcerated in London, UK. The current leader, Sivanesathurai Chandrakanthan, was elected chief minister of the east in the eastern province elections held in 2008 by the government after the liberation of the east from the LTTE.

In 1990, the Eelam People's Democratic Party another major Tamil group joined as a paramilitary group and the Sri Lankan government agreed to fund the group.

According to the Sri Lankan nationalist Asian Tribune website, by the end of the war in 2009, the Paramilitaries were disarmed and most of them entered politics. However, civilians giving evidence to the Lessons Learnt and Reconciliation Commission (LLRC) claimed that the paramilitary groups were still engaged in violence, including abductions and murder. The LLRC found that the government had failed to disarm the paramilitary groups which were still recruiting children. One of the main recommendations of the LLRC was that the government disarm the paramilitary groups. In 2011, the US government has also called on the government to stop paramilitary activity in the north of the country.

== See also ==
- List of Sri Lankan Tamil militant groups
