= Meenambakkam bomb blast =

1984 attack in Madras, Tamil Nadu, India

The Meenambakkam bomb blast was a terrorist attack that occurred on August 2, 1984, at Meenambakkam International Airport in Madras, Tamil Nadu, India, now known as Chennai International Airport in Chennai, India. A total of 33 people were killed, and 27 others were injured. The bombing was perpetrated by the Tamil Eelam Army, a Sri Lankan Tamil militant group, and only five of its members were convicted for the bombing.

== Background ==
The Tamil Eelam Army (TEA) was formed in 1983 with the intention of securing an independent state of Tamil Eelam. Led by Panagoda Maheswaran, the organization had about 1,300 volunteers. Maheshwaran had a degree in chemical engineering from London University and was an expert in bomb making. He'd earned the nickname 'Panagoda' after escaping a maximum-security prison in the Sri Lankan city of the same name. After a brief period of intense struggle, Maheshwaran and roughly 130 other TEA members had escaped to the Indian state of Tamil Nadu vowing to continue their fight. However, their first case of subversion in the Meenambakkam bombing did not strike its intended target.

== Planned Air Lanka Airport Bombing ==
Bombs were placed in two suitcases loaded onto an airplane bound for Sri Lanka, with Maheshwaran intending the blast to strike an airport in Colombo. A timer was set for detonation at 10:52 p.m. when the Air Lanka flight UL-122 was scheduled to reach Colombo International Airport. The aircraft was to leave Madras, India, at 8:10 p.m. that evening. The TEA's intention was to explode the bomb after the luggage was removed from the plane in Sri Lanke and dispatched to the cargo complex. The intensity of the blast would have destroyed at least six planes in the airport, police said.

== Foiled attempt and arrests ==
Maheshwaran purchased a ticket for the Air Lanka flight but never boarded the plane. His accomplices included a film actor and flying club member Saravana Bhavan, a Sri Lankan named Thambiraja, an airport police constable Chandra Kumar, and two Air Lanka employees Loganathan and Vijayakumar. They attempted to transmit the luggage to the intended Air Lanka flight, but the luggage was mistakenly included in baggage for a flight to London. When Maheshwaran was identified as the only passenger not to board the aircraft, customs authorities detained the luggage.

== Warnings and security response ==
The Air Lanka flight took off around 8:15 p.m. without the bombs on board. The accused were monitoring the entire incident from within the airport and made repeated calls warning the airport authorities about the bombs in the confiscated luggage. At 10:10 p.m., the airport manager received an anonymous call that two dark-brown suitcases in customs contained bombs. The call was transferred to a superior and contact was immediately made to airport security, the Deputy Commissioner of Police, and the Deputy Superintendent of Police. There was no answer when the airport police were phoned, while customs agents laughed at the warning and considered the anonymous call to be a hoax.

== Explosion and casualties ==
Though the police eventually tried to retrieve the luggage, a customs inspector had objected to handing over the baggage as he believed it contained contraband, most likely gold bars. Two more anonymous calls were made by the TEA volunteers warning that the luggage contained explosives which would detonate around 11:00 p.m., but only after the third call did the customs inspector concede to hand over the suitcases.

By then it was too late. The blast occurred at 10.52 p.m. when a baggage handler attempted to move the luggage to a more secure location, killing over 27 transit passengers bound for Sri Lanka and six airport security officials while destroying the international arrival hall.

== Arrests, trials, and sentences ==
Crime Branch CID police arrested 10 people in the case, while a Sri Lanka national Sree was absconding. Four of the accused jumped bail including Maheshwaran, Thambiraja, and an accomplice named Vigneswara Raja. The District Sessions Judge, Chengalpattu, convicted five individuals including Saravana Bhavan, Loganathan, Vijay Kumar, Balasubramaniam, and Chandra Kumar. All five were sentenced to life in prison.
