= Chennai International Airport =

Airport serving Chennai, Tamil Nadu, India

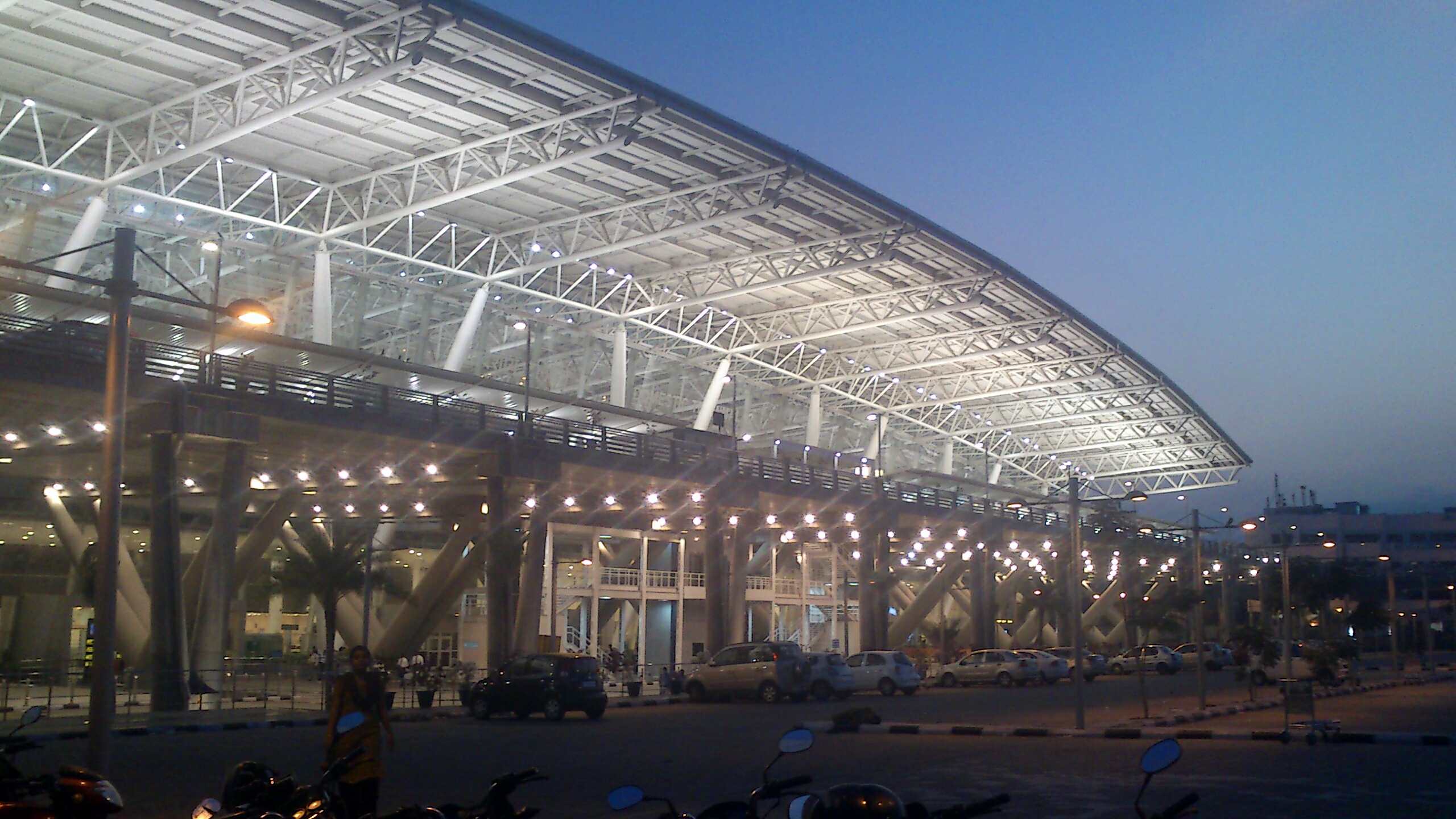
- IATA: MAA; ICAO: VOMM; WMO: 43279

Summary
- Airport type: Public
- Owner: Ministry of Civil Aviation
- Operator: Airports Authority of India
- Serves: Chennai metropolitan area
- Location: Tirusulam, Chennai, Tamil Nadu, India
- Opened: 1930; 96 years ago
- Hub for: Blue Dart Aviation
- Focus city for: Air India
- Operating base for: IndiGo
- Elevation AMSL: 16 m (52 ft)
- Coordinates: 12°58′56″N 80°9′49″E
- Public transit access: (South Line) Tirusulam; Blue Line Airport Metro
- Website: www.chennaiinternationalairport.com

Runways
Direction	Length		Surface
Direction	m	ft	Surface
07/25	3,661	12,011	Asphalt
12/30	2,890	9,482	Asphalt

Statistics (April 2025 – March 2026)
- Passengers: 23,017,324 (▲2.7%)
- Aircraft movements: 158,702 (▲1.6%)
- Cargo tonnage: 422,515.9 (▲11.4%)
- Source: AAI

Chennai International Airport (IATA: MAA, ICAO: VOMM) is an international airport serving the city of Chennai, the capital of Tamil Nadu, India. It is located in Tirusulam in Chengalpattu district, in the Greater Chennai Metropolitan Area around 21 km (13 mi) southwest of the city centre. The first air service was operated in 1915 and the airport was commissioned in 1930. The airport serves as the southern regional headquarters of the Airports Authority of India (AAI) for South India comprising the states of Andhra Pradesh, Karnataka, Kerala, Tamil Nadu and Telangana, and the union territories of Lakshadweep and Puducherry.

The airport is the fifth-busiest airport in India by passenger traffic and aircraft movements, and fourth-busiest by cargo handled in India and international traffic. In the financial year 2024–25, the airport handled over 22 million passengers and 0.37 million tonnes of cargo. The airport has two asphalt runways and offers direct flights to three continents. Terminals 1 and 4 handle domestic traffic and Terminal 2, which is being expanded to replace the older Terminal 3, handles international operation. A new satellite terminal is also under construction. A dedicated air cargo complex operates out of the old passenger terminal at Meenambakkam. The airport serves as a hub for Blue Dart Aviation, a focus city for Air India, and an operating base for IndiGo.

The airport is expected to reach saturation by 2035, with a peak capacity of 40 million passengers; a new greenfield airport has been proposed to supplement it. The airport is served by the Chennai International Airport Metro Station of the Chennai Metro and the Tirusulam railway station of the Chennai Suburban Railway.

== History ==
=== Beginning and establishment ===
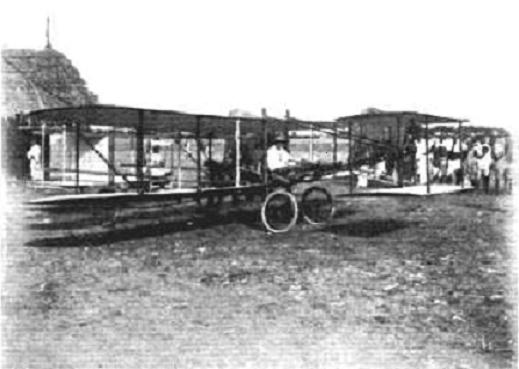
Giacomo D'Angelis and his biplane in 1910 during the first flight in the city

The aviation history of the city began in 1910, when a city-based Corsican hotelier Giacomo D'Angelis built a biplane powered by a small engine in association with Simpson's, a leading coach-builder in the city. He tested it at Island Grounds at Madras, making it the first powered flight in Asia. Further flying displays were performed by a set of aviators including Baron de Caters and Jules Tyck in February 1911. J. W. Madley, a water works engineer with the Madras government, flew an aircraft he had assembled over the Red Hills reservoir and shot aerial photographs in 1914.

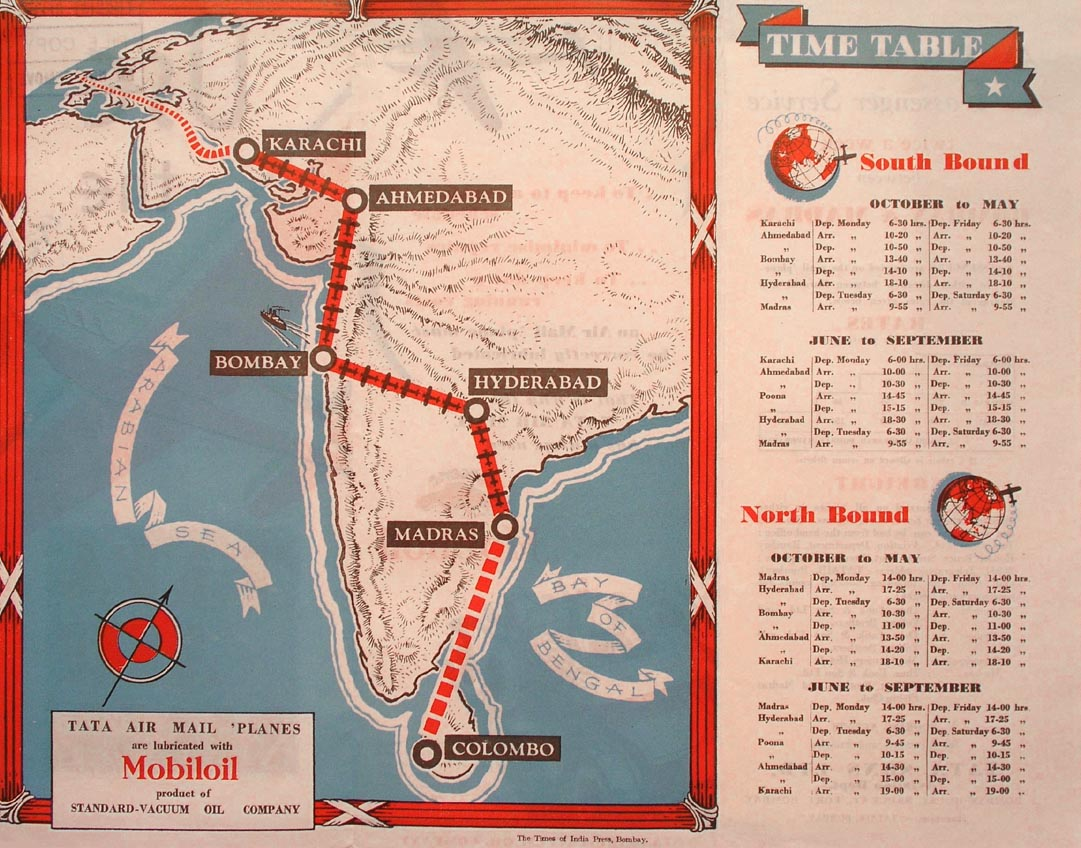
Tata Sons' airline timetable, c. 1935

In 1915, Tata Air Mail started an airmail service between Karachi and Madras, marking the beginning of civil aviation in South India. A discussion initiated by pilot G. Vlasto led to the founding of Madras Flying Club in March 1930. The first instructional flight took off from the airstrip in July 1930.

Commissioned in 1930, Madras aerodrome was one of the first airports of India. On 15 October 1932, J. R. D. Tata flew a Puss Moth aircraft carrying air mail from Karachi to Bombay's Juhu Airstrip. Piloted by aviator Nevill Vintcent, it continued to Madras and became the first scheduled flight to land at the airport. The first mail service to Colombo was operated by Tata in 1936, with regular mail and passenger service commencing later in 1938. Although commercial services came into operation earlier, the airport was confined mostly to military operations during World War II, when it became the base of Royal Indian Air Force.

=== Expansion ===
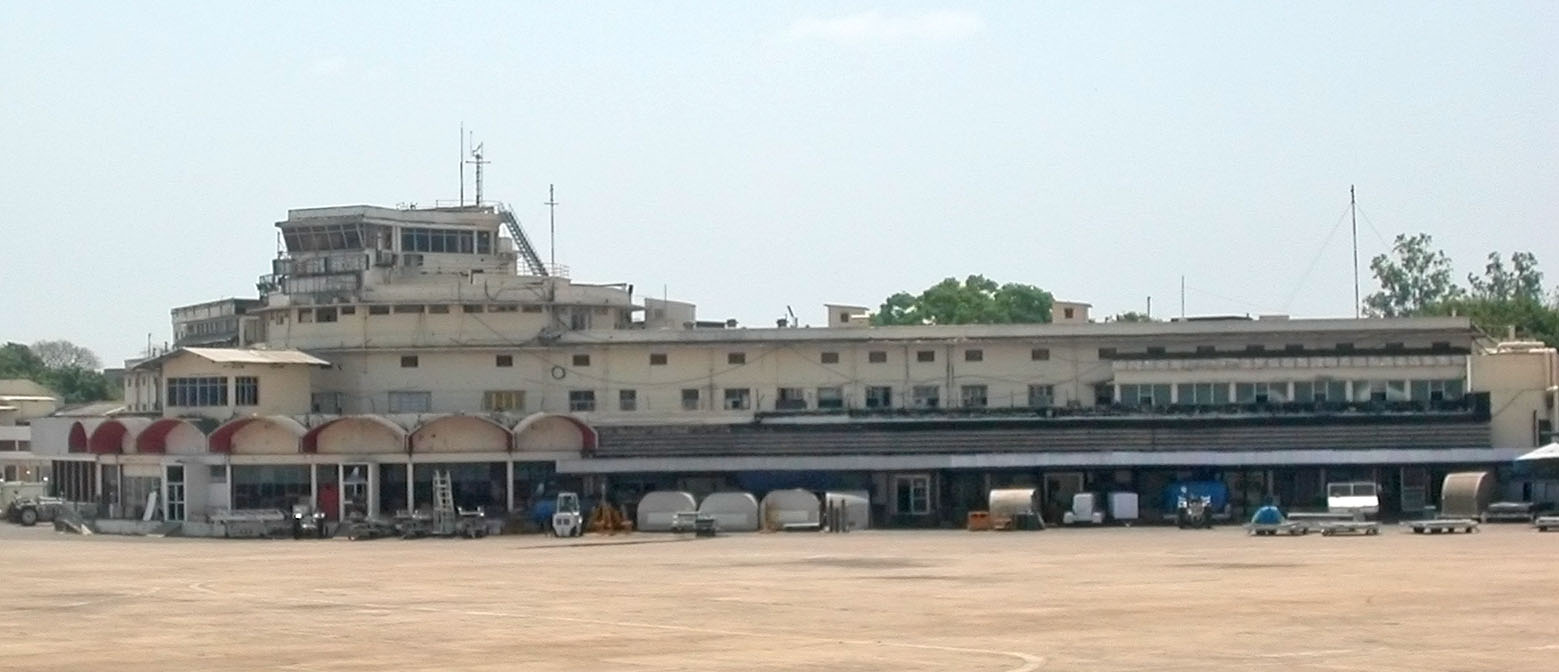
The old terminal at Meenambakkam, now used for cargo

In 1952, the Civil Aviation Department took over the operations of the airport. The first passenger terminal was built in 1954 on the northeastern side of Meenambakkam, and the airport operated as a customs airport with limited international services. In 1972, the airport came under the purview of Airports Authority of India (AAI). An air cargo complex was commissioned on 1 February 1978, which was the second gateway air cargo terminal in the country, after Kolkata airport. In August 1984, a bomb blast near the airport killed 33 people and injured 27 others. The entire concourse was razed down and had to be rebuilt. The passenger operations were shifted to the new domestic terminal built at Tirusulam in 1985. An international terminal was added in 1989 and the old terminal building was used for air cargo.

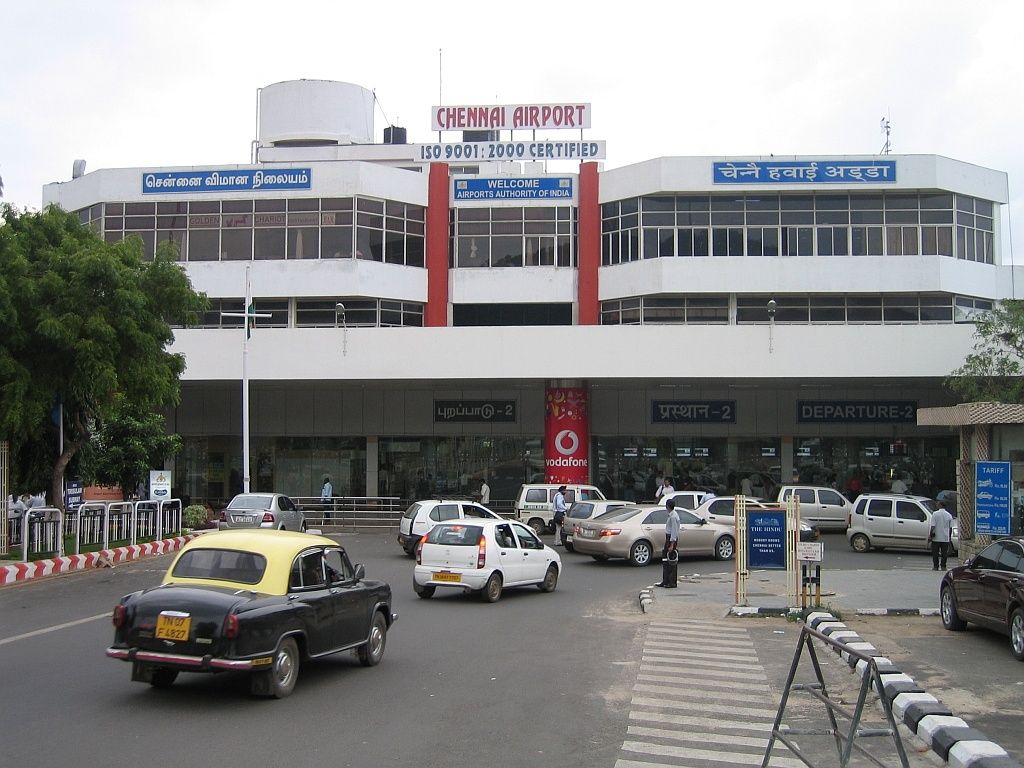
The terminal added in 1980s

In November 1988, British Airways commenced services to Europe, flying to London's Heathrow Airport with Boeing 747s from April 1991. On 23 September 1999, a handling centre for flowers, fruits and vegetables was commissioned at the air cargo terminal. In 2001, the international airport became the first in the country to receive the ISO 9001-2000 certification. A new international departure terminal was commissioned in 2003. In May 2005, Delta Air Lines commenced the first direct flights to the Americas, connecting Chennai with New York City via Paris.

In 2008, the AAI started a major modernisation project. Two new terminals (Terminal 1 and 4) were constructed, the existing international terminal (Terminal 3) was renovated, the secondary runway was extended, and new taxiways, parking bays and a fire station were constructed.

=== 2015 floods and later modernisation ===
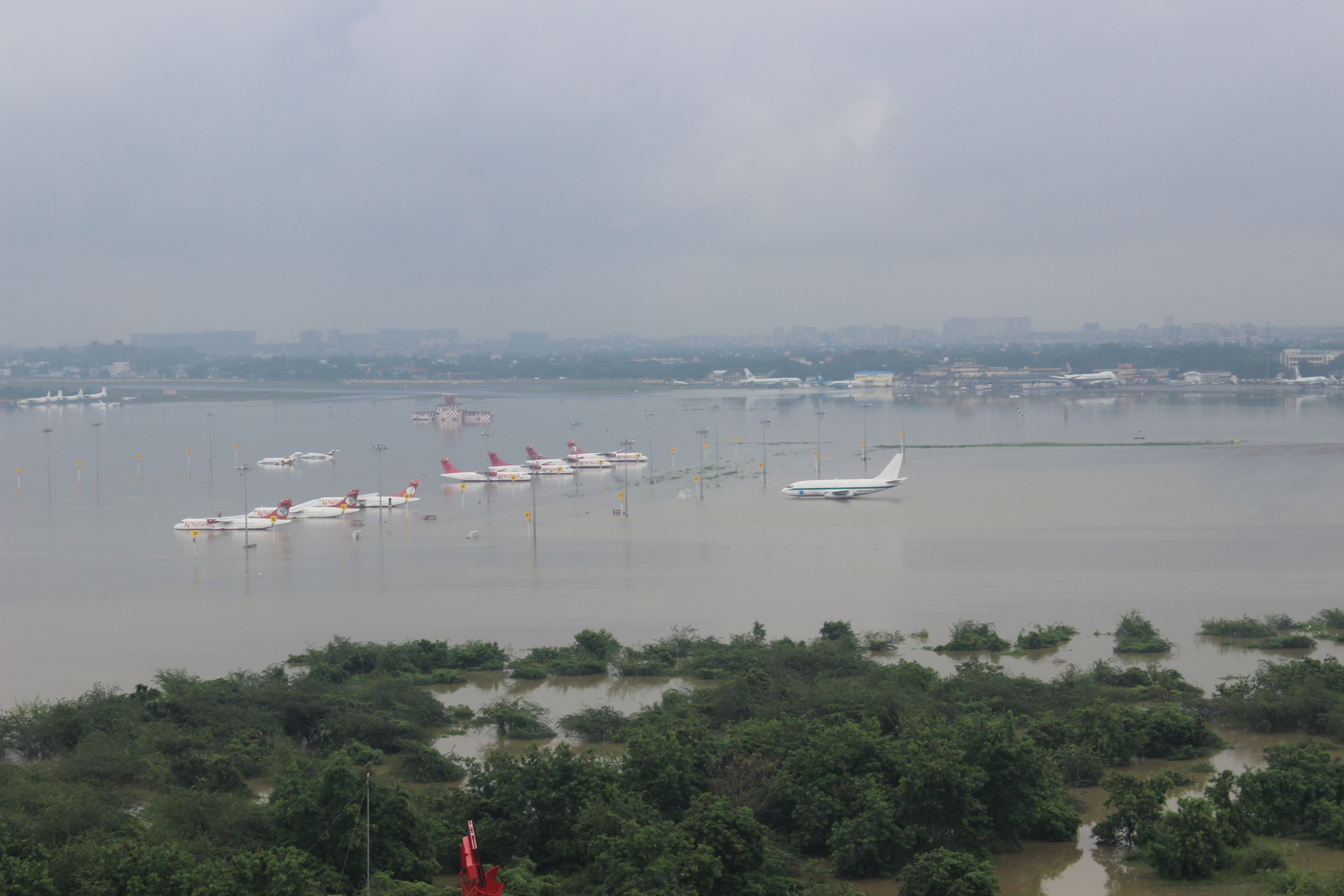
Aerial view of submerged Chennai airport

In December 2015, unprecedented rainfall associated with India's Northeast monsoon caused extensive flooding of the airport tarmac and runways. As part of the airport is situated on the floodplains of the Adyar river, extensive waterlogging occurred in the airport. The airport was closed for a week to all traffic from 1 to 6 December. About 1,500 passengers and 2,000 airport workers were evacuated as water entered terminal buildings and 30–35 aircraft were stranded on the apron. Military authorities permitted the use of Naval Air Station INS Rajali in Arakkonam, 70 km (43 mi) west of central Chennai and Tambaram Air Force Station 20 km (12 mi) south as relief airports for a limited service of civilian commercial flights as well as official rescue/assistance flights. The Indian Air Force evacuated passengers from Chennai airport to the two military bases for onward journeys on Air Force transport aircraft to other domestic destinations. On 5 December, the Directorate General of Civil Aviation permitted a partial re-opening of the airport during daylight hours under visual meteorological conditions only, allowing airlines to ferry stranded aircraft without passengers or cargo on board. Operations under instrument meteorological conditions were not permitted and rescue and assistance flights, were permitted to operate in and out of the airport from 6 December.

In 2018, the construction of a new integrated terminal (Terminal 2) to expand the capacity began and the flight operations started from the new terminal on 7 July 2023.

== Administration ==
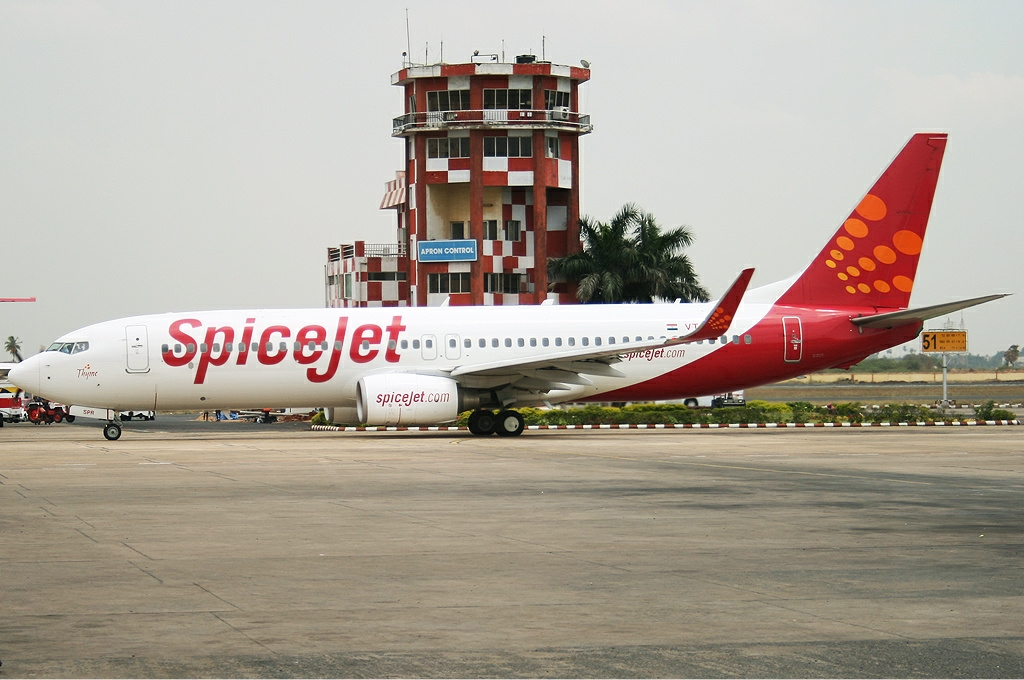
Air traffic control complex with an aircraft in the foreground

Chennai Airport is owned and operated by the Airports Authority of India and serves as the regional headquarters of the AAI for the southern region of India comprising the states of Andhra Pradesh, Karnataka, Kerala, Tamil Nadu, and Telangana, and the union territories of Lakshadweep, and Puducherry. It functions from the Air Traffic Control Complex within the airport. The airport is the centre of the southern flight information region (FIR), one of the four FIRs that the Indian air space is divided into. It is alo responsible for the air traffic services over the Chennai FIR, which consist of five southern states, two southern union territories, and oceanic air space over parts of the Bay of Bengal and the Arabian Sea.

The immigration services at the airport are handled by the Bureau of Immigration of the Ministry of Home Affairs. The airport is the home to the southern regional office of the Bureau of Civil Aviation Security (BCAS), which is responsible for the security of flights. The Airport Sector (CISF) provides security, including a dog squad for identification of narcotics and bomb disposal.

In 2013, the Government of India proposed to offer a contract to a private operator to operate the airport, which the AAI invited bids for. The plan did not materialise because airport employees, fearing job losses, protested against the move.

== Facilities ==
=== Runways ===
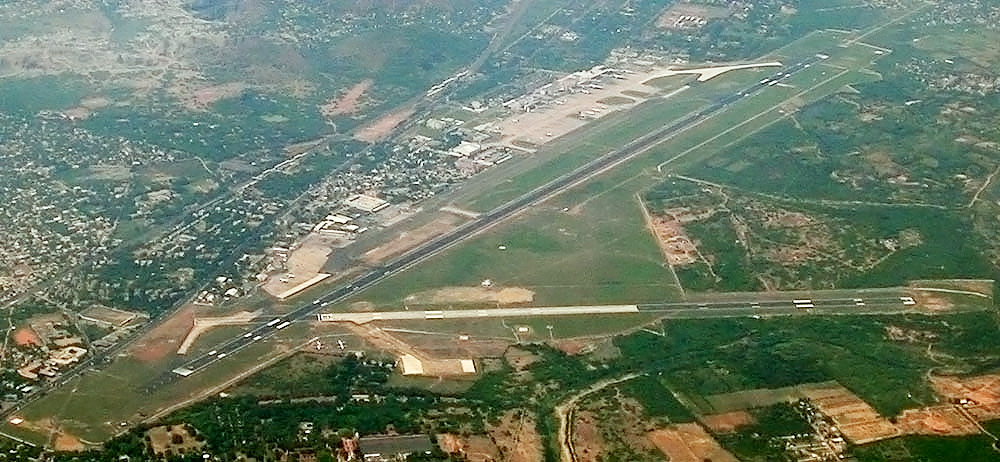
Aerial view of the primary (left) and the secondary runway in 2005.

The airport has two runways – the 3,661 m (12,011 ft) long primary runway 07/25 (Northeast – Southwest orientation) and the 2,890 m (9,480 ft) long secondary runway 12/30 (Northwest – Southeast orientation). The runways are equipped with CAT-I Instrument Landing System (ILS) for IFR approach with Precision Approach Path Indicator (PAPI) landing aids. An upgraded ILS was installed on runway 07/25 in 2017. As the airport is not equipped with a CAT-III landing system, which will enable operations in poor visibility conditions, disruptions in flight operations happen in poor weather conditions. In 2012, the AAI acquired additional land to install new landing lights and upgrade the ILS.

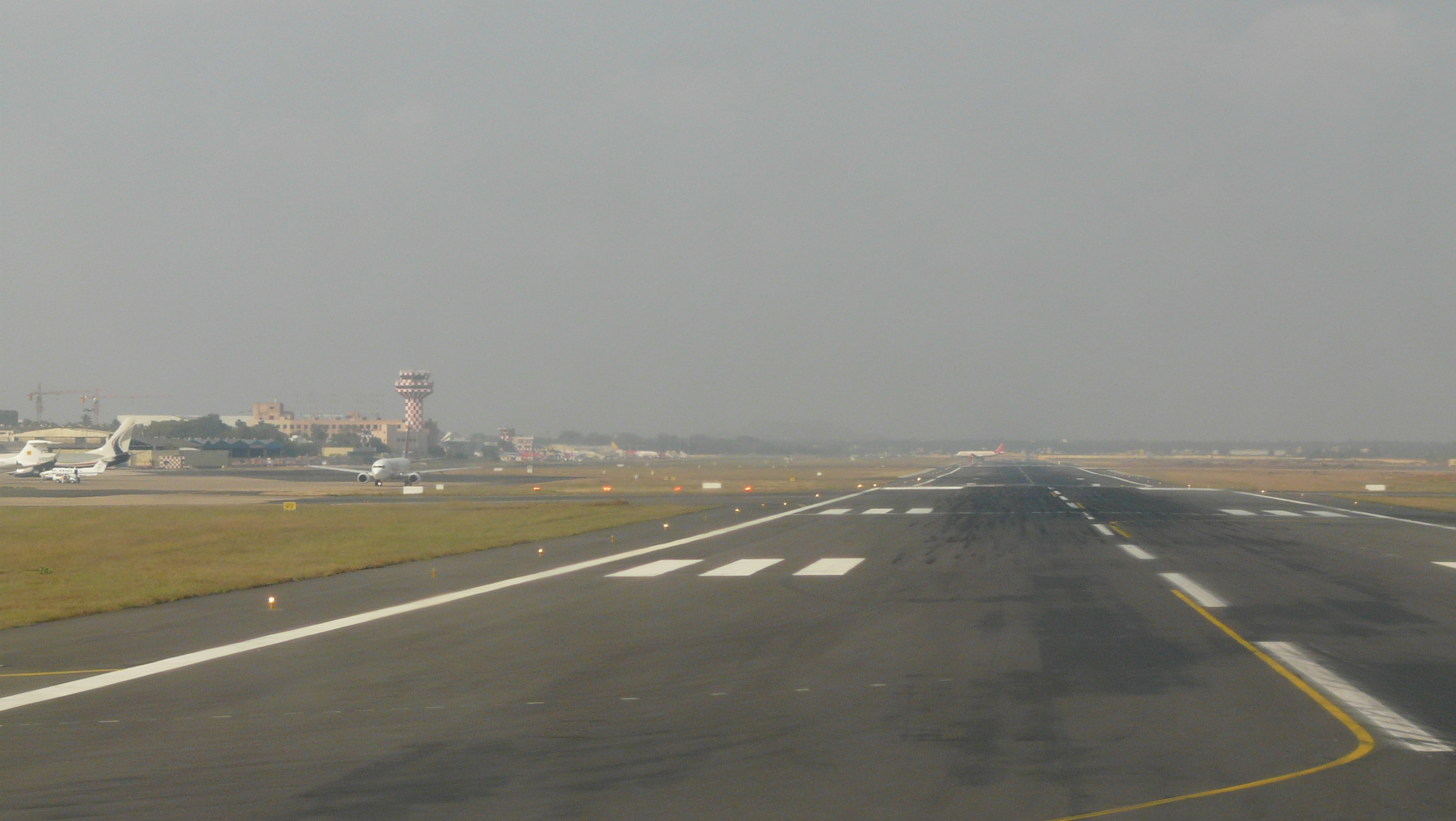
Primary runway 07/25 approaching from the north-east

The secondary runway (12/30) was closed in 2009 to extend it over the Adyar River by means of a bridge over the watercourse at a cost of ₹4,300 million (US$46 million). The runway which was initially 2,035 m (6,677 ft) long was planned to be extended to 3,445 m (11,302 ft). The expansion was completed in March 2011.

The bridge over the Adyar river accommodated the runway and a taxiway, making Chennai airport the first international airport in India to have a runway across a river. The commissioning was delayed due to work on landing lights and VOR antenna. In February 2012, airport authorities announced that only about 2,160 m (7,090 ft) of the secondary runway would be operational due to displacements at both ends and the runway which was earlier used by only smaller aircraft, would be able to accommodate narrow body aircraft.

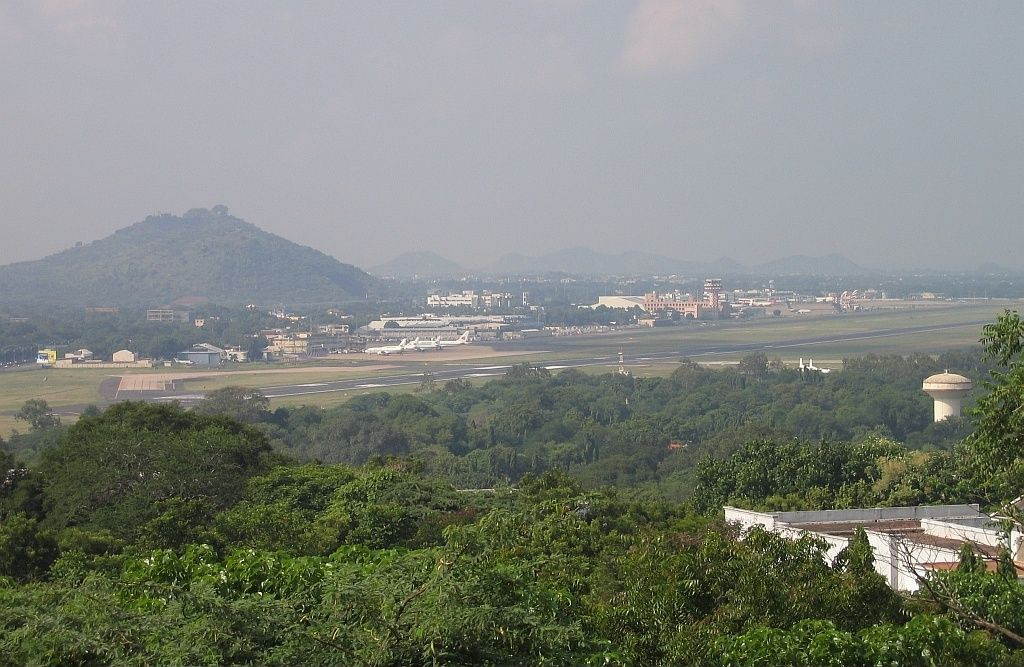
Primary runway 07/25 as seen from St. Thomas Mount

The layout consists of a long taxiway (B) and a shorter taxiway (R) parallel to primary runway 07/25 and parallel taxiway (N) oriented along the secondary runway 12/30. Two taxiways (P and Q) linked the two runways. Apart from the primary taxiways, other secondary taxiways interconnect the runways, main taxiways and parking aprons. In January 2018, the airport began cross-runway operations to reduce flight delays. In May 2023, a rapid exit taxi way was added 1,831 m (6,007 ft) from the threshold on the primary runway 07 and another taxi way linking the main apron. This reduced the runway occupancy time and helped with the plan to increase in flight handling capacity from 36 to 45 flights per hour. In January 2024, AAI announced plans to construct 11 new rapid taxi-ways to improve aircraft handling.

=== Passenger terminals ===
The airport occupies an area of 1,301 acres (526 ha) with the passenger terminals located in Tirusulam in Chengalpattu district. As of 2024, the airport consists of three operational passenger terminals with Terminals 1 and 4 catering to domestic traffic and Terminal 2 handling international traffic. The power supply to the airport is provided by Tamil Nadu Power Distribution Corporation Limited through a 11,000 kV sub-station.

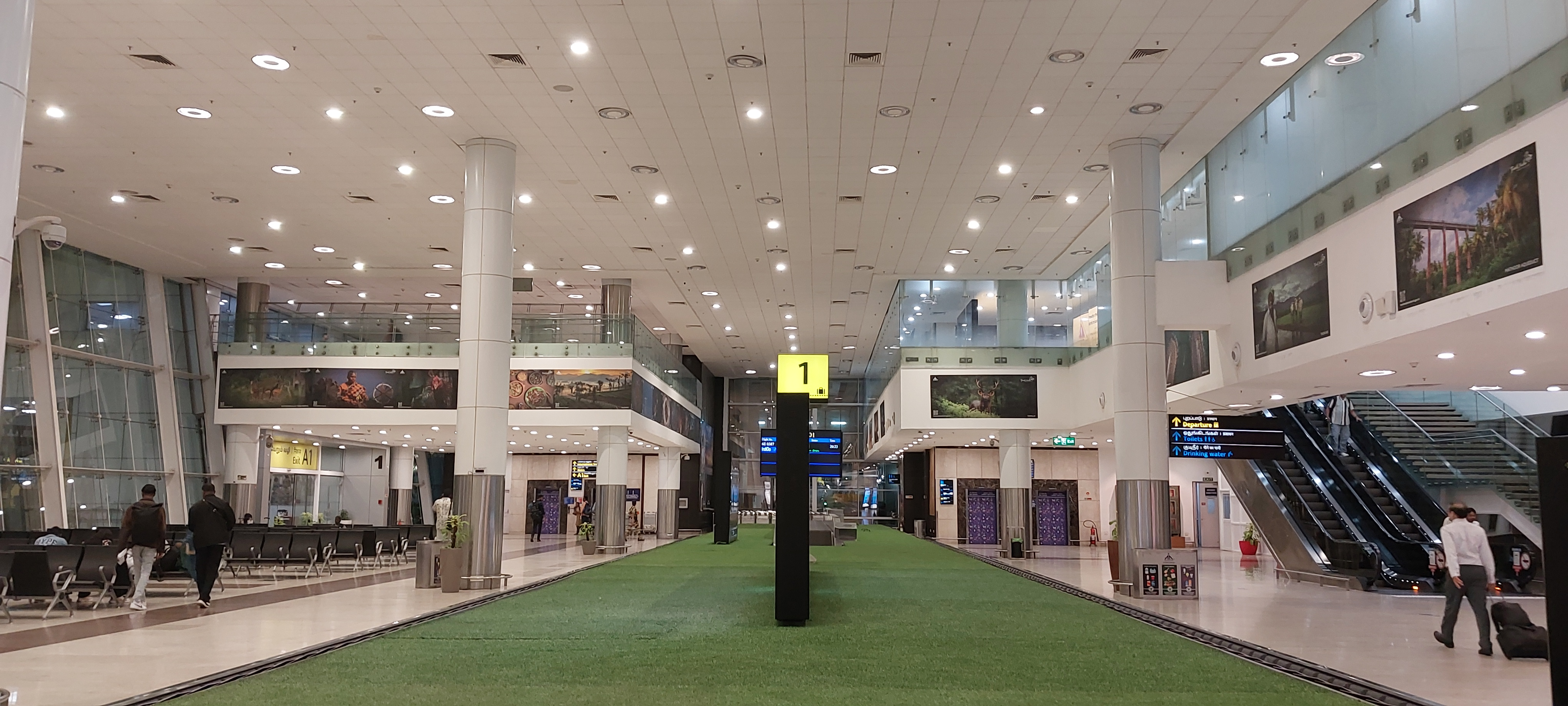
Interior of Terminal 1

Terminals 1 and 4 have three levels with the departure area on the top level with an elevated corridor, which has approach and exit ramps. The arrivals section is on the ground level, which also serves as the base for airlines and other offices. The basement is used for luggage handling. Terminal 1, which can handle 16 million passengers per year, covers 67,700 m^{2} (729,000 sq ft), has seven gates, 52 check-in counters, and eight counters for e-ticketing. Terminal 4 which was originally built to handle international operations, covers an area of 59,300 m^{2} (638,000 sq ft) and is capable of handling 7 million passengers per year. Both the terminals are equipped with an in-line baggage handling system and security screening system with four departure conveyors of a length of 3,500 m (11,500 ft) and can handle 1,200 baggage pieces per hour. The terminals are designed with two sustainable gardens with wing-like roofs and glass facades. Rainwater is harvested and used to sustain the gardens. There is 9,000 m^{2} (97,000 sq ft) of space at the terminals, consisting of duty-free retail shops, restaurants, snack bars, and executive lounges. There have been more than 65 incidents of false ceiling collapses and breakage of glass windows reported from the terminals over the years.

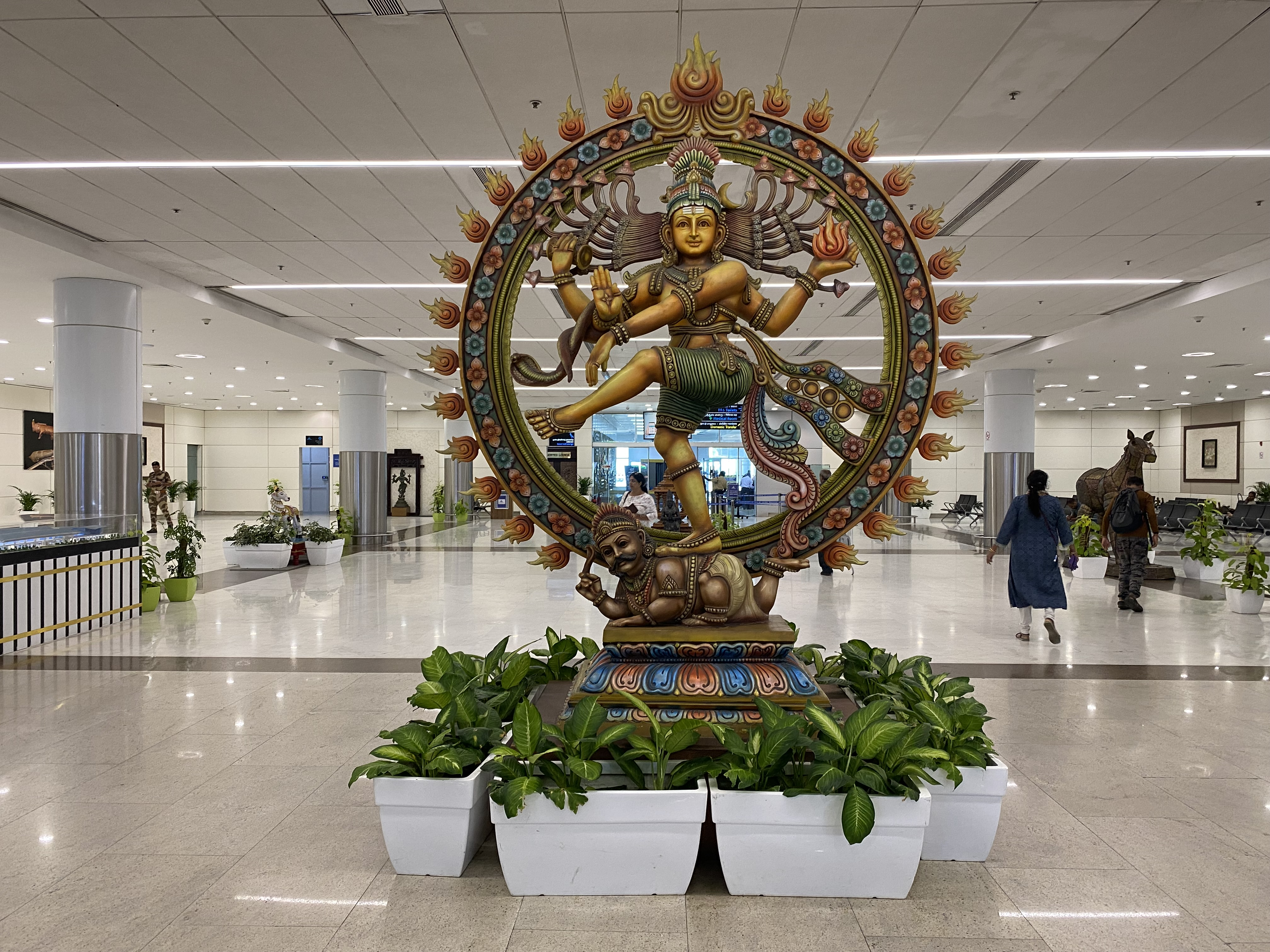
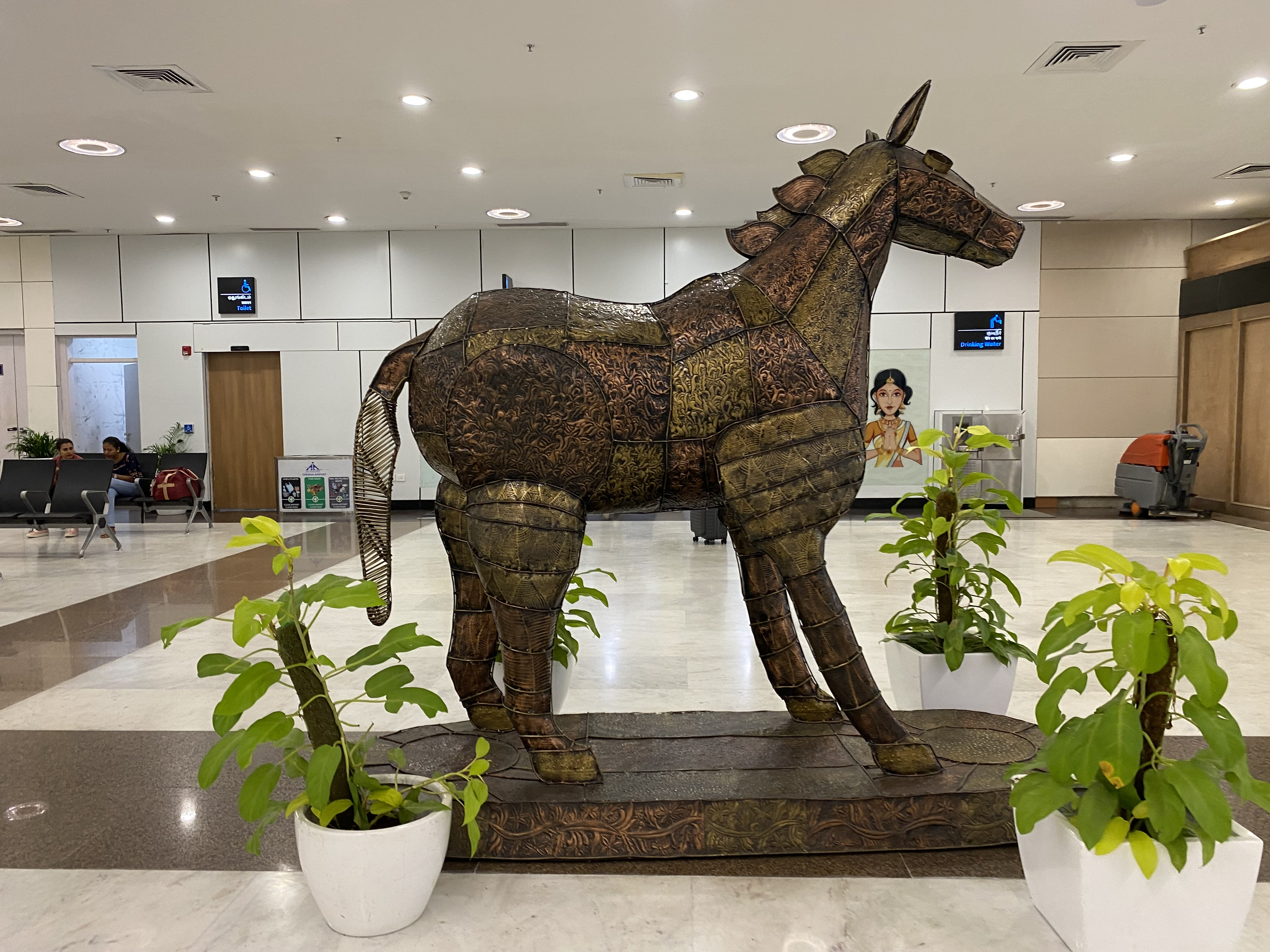
Interior of Terminal 2 showing art decorations

As a part of expansion plan unveiled in 2018, a new integrated terminal and a satellite terminal were planned to increase the terminal area to 160,000 m^{2} (1,700,000 sq ft) with a capacity of 35 million passengers, up from then existing capacity of 18 million. The satellite terminal near the secondary runway is connected to the main buildings by a 1.5 km (0.93 mi) long tunnel built at a cost of ₹7,000 million (US$75 million). The new integrated Terminal 2 replaced the older Terminals 2 and 3 which were situated between Terminals 1 and 4. It commenced partial operations on 7 July 2023. The new terminal is designed with the inspiration from Tamil culture, with the building's exterior inspired from Dravidian Architecture of Hindu temples and the roof inspired from pleats of sari worn by Bharatanatyam dancers. The flooring and the false ceiling feature Kolam patterns and colourful murals. The outside of the terminal features a 1,730-kilogram Nachiarkoil lamp.

With the new integrated terminal opening in May 2023, the old Terminal 3 was demolished to extend the new integrated terminal (Terminal 2). This second phase of construction involved the expansion of the existing terminal by 60,000 m^{2} (650,000 sq ft). The complete new terminal building would be spread over 197,000 m^{2} (2,120,000 sq ft) and have a handling capacity of 10 million passengers. The terminal has 100 check-in counters, 11 automated tray retrieval systems, six self-bag drops and six baggage reclaim belts. It is equipped with a passenger flow monitoring system (PFMS) that helps in management of passenger operations.

=== Cargo complex ===
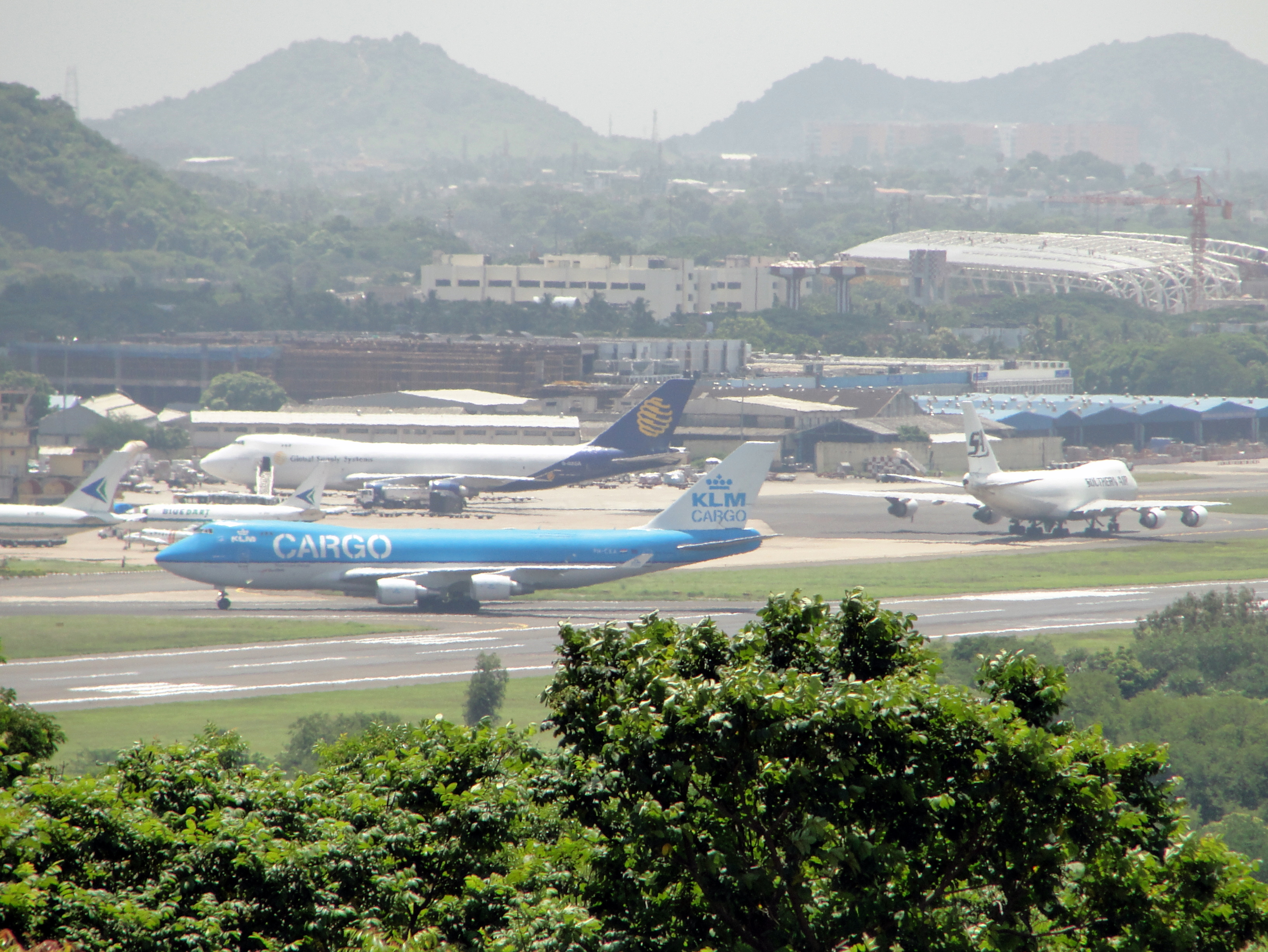
Cargo terminal at the airport

The air cargo complex at the airport was established in 1978, with regulatory and facilitating agencies brought under one roof for faster processing and clearance of international cargo. Following the construction of new passenger terminals at Tirusulam, the old passenger terminal at Meenambakkam serves as the air cargo complex. The air cargo complex covers an area of 19.6 acres (7.9 ha) and is operated by AAI Cargo Logistics and Allied Services Company (AAICLAS), a subsidiary of AAI.

The cargo complex consists of two divisions, namely, the export and the import wings. The export facility covers an area of 20,595 m^{2} (221,680 sq ft) and the import facility is spread across 20,096 m^{2} (216,310 sq ft). The cargo complex is equipped with Automated Storage and Retrieval System (ASRS) for efficient storage and easy retrieval of cargo and operates fully mechanised Elevated Transfer Vehicles (ETV) for faster and easier cargo loading and unloading. The complex also has temperature-controlled cold storage for perishable cargo, and secured storage rooms for high value cargo. As only a limited number of flights could be handled at the existing cargo complex, plans to build an integrated cargo handling terminal to increase the capacity to 0.3 million tonnes per annum was announced in early 2024.

=== Parking bays ===
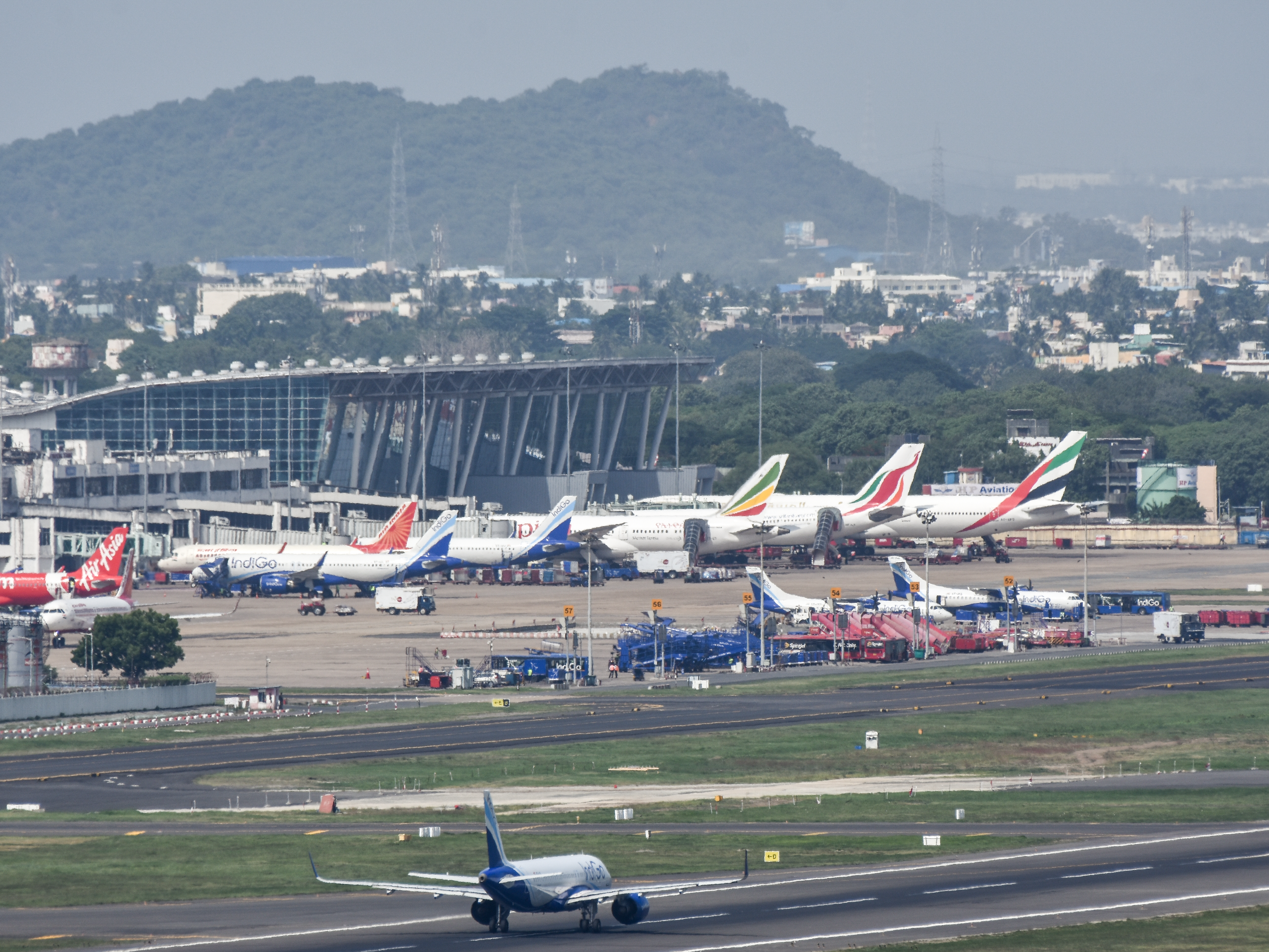
Aircraft parked on the main apron

The airport has 90 parking bays including 18 in-contact bays connected to the passenger terminals. The main apron (A) located to the south of the primary runway and the parallel taxiway B accommodates 33 parking bays including 11 parking bays that can accommodate wide body aircraft. Two aprons (Aprons II and III) are located between the two runways. Apron II can park 36 narrow-body aircraft and Apron III can accommodate 12 wide-body aircraft including one parking bay that can park an Airbus A380.

A remote apron (Apron I) located to the east of the secondary runway can accommodate a further eight narrow body jets. A smaller apron (T) located towards the east end of the secondary runway has three parking bays. An apron (B) located to the east of the air cargo complex caters to cargo operations has 10 parking bays with three of them accommodating wide body aircraft.

=== Air traffic control ===
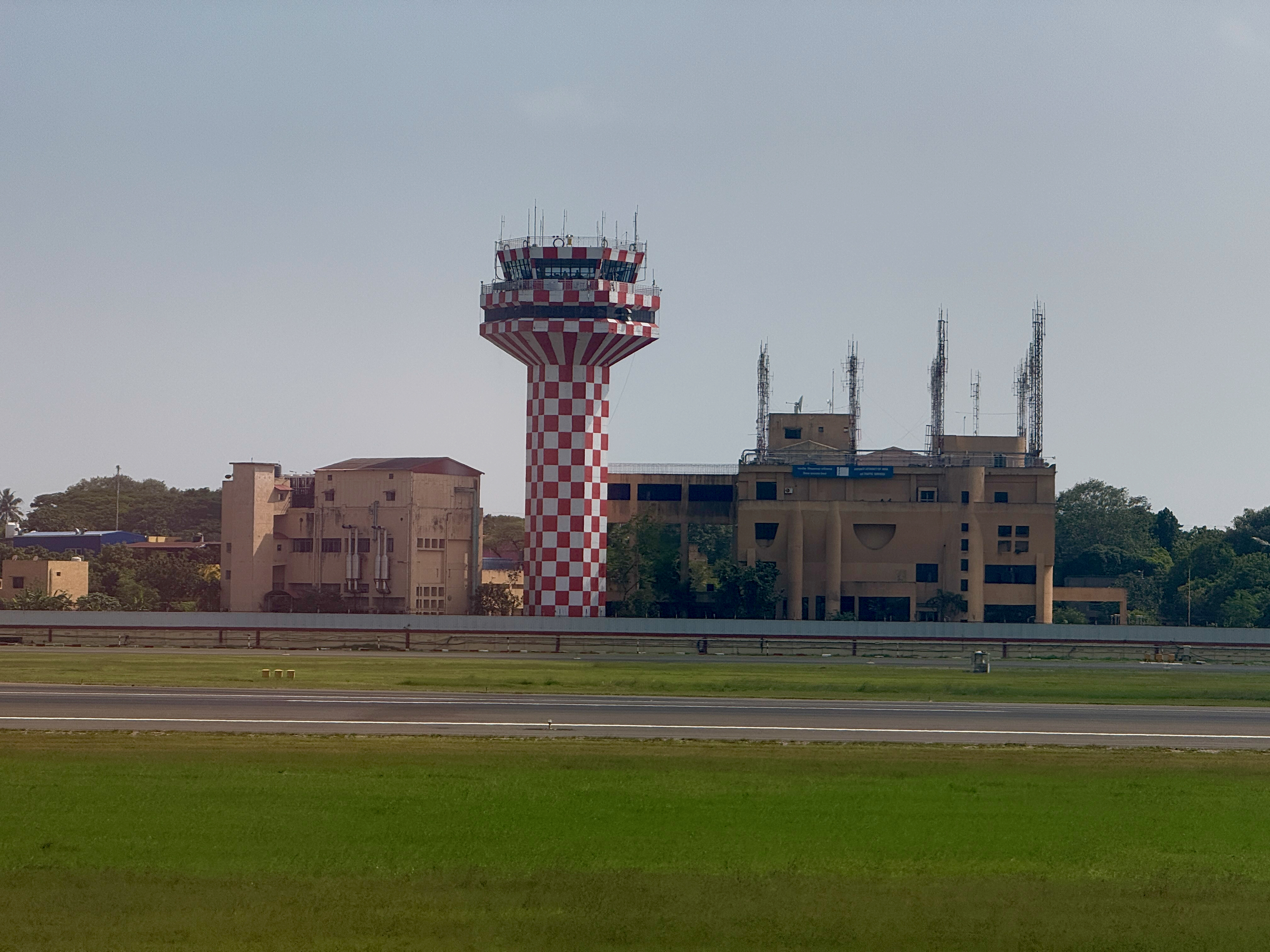
Air traffic control tower

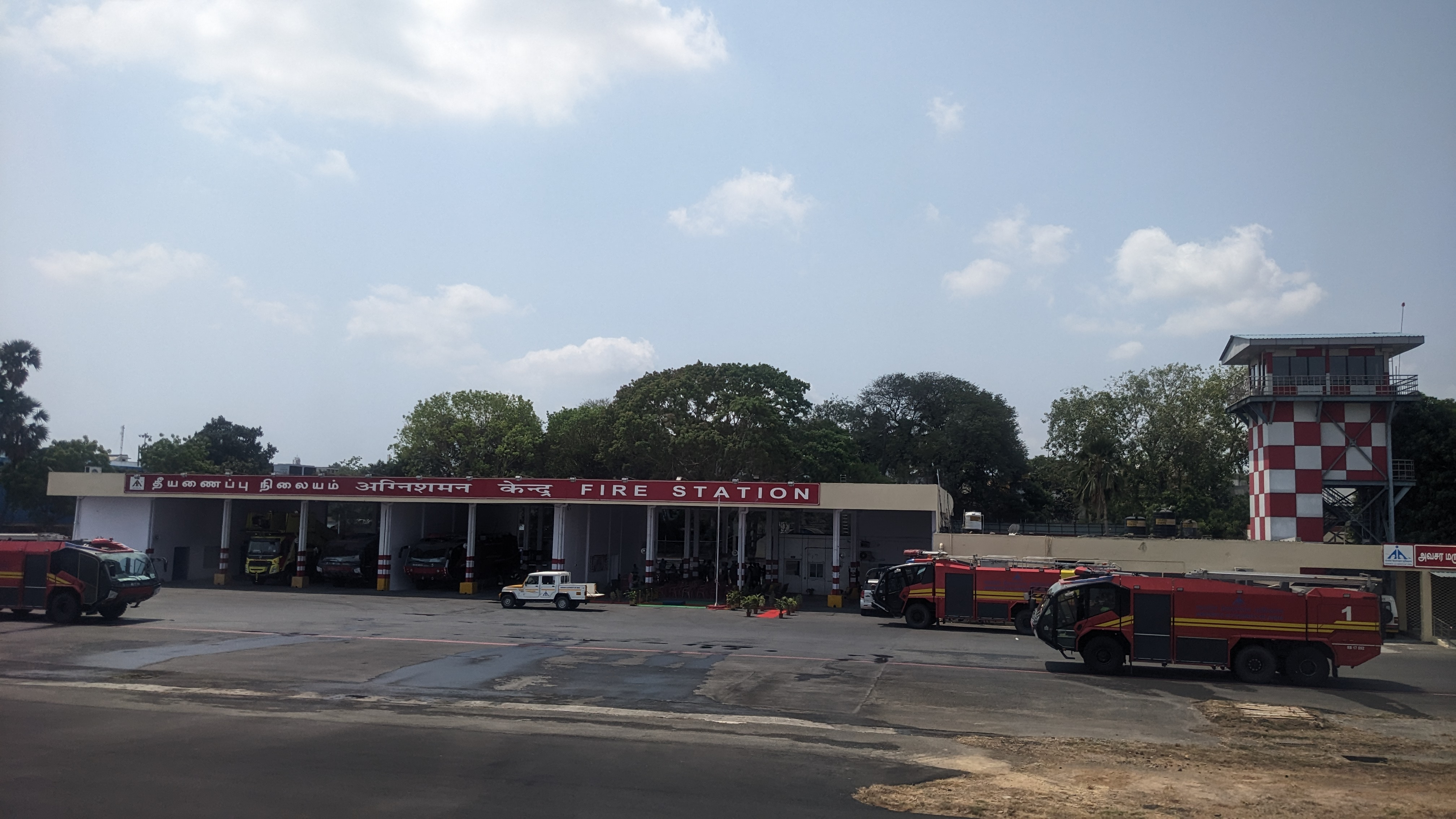
Airport fire station

The Air traffic control tower is located at the Air Traffic Services Complex and is equipped with advanced surface movement guidance and control system. An automated smart flight guidance system was installed in October 2011 at a cost of ₹420 million (US$4.5 million). The automated system combines information from tower control, approach control, area control and oceanic control. There are two radars, a secondary surveillance radar and a terminal radar. As the airport controls one of the four flight information regions in the country, other radar systems in the region are integrated with the ATC at Chennai. In 2021, AAI announced plans to construct a new ATC complex at the airport.

=== Other facilities ===
The old parking lot at the airport accommodated 1,200 cars. In June 2018, a six-level car park with a capacity to accommodate 2,237 cars was planned in front of the airport on a 4.25-acre plot. Construction began in March 2019, was completed in December 2021 and opened in 2022. In addition, a 250,000 ft^{2} (23,000 m^{2}) mall named Aerohub was built. The mall has a 238,100 ft^{2} (22,120 m^{2}) cinema multiplex and a 35,678 ft^{2} (3,314.6 m^{2}) 59-key transit hotel facility. TajSATS, a joint-venture of the Indian Hotels Company and SATS, provides in-flight catering at the airport. It also manages the airport lounges. Taj Madras Flight Kitchen, a joint venture of the Indian Hotels, SATS and Malaysia Airlines which started in 1994, operates restaurants at the airport.

In 2008, a 6,503 m^{2} (70,000 sq ft) maintenance, repair and overhaul (MRO) hangar was established at a cost of ₹111.5 million (US$1.2 million). The facility can handle one large or two smaller aircraft and functions as a repair shop and assembly area. It is equipped with an engineering and training facility and an engineering maintenance conference room. Fire and rescue services at the airport are provided by Tamil Nadu Fire and Rescue Services in conjunction with AAI.

== Future plans ==
The existing airport is expected to reach saturation by 2035, with a peak capacity of 40 million passengers. Plans for a second greenfield airport for the city have been put forward since 2012. While in August 2022, the state government selected Parandur in Kanchipuram district as location for the new airport, the project was cancelled in June 2026.

In mid-2026, the Airport Authority of India and the state government announced plans to construct a new passenger terminal (Terminal 5) in the north-western section of the airport. Designed to add an estimated capacity of 20 million passengers per annum, the project includes dedicated access infrastructure, such as a new approach road and flyover. Preliminary administrative processes and land acquisition for the expansion were initiated by state authorities in October 2026.

== Airlines and destinations ==
=== Passenger ===
Airlines	Destinations
Air Arabia	Sharjah
Air Arabia Abu Dhabi	Abu Dhabi
Air India	Delhi, Mumbai
Air India Express	Bengaluru, Guwahati, Kolkata, Madurai, Port Blair, Pune, Siliguri, Singapore
Air Mauritius	Mauritius
AirAsia	Kuala Lumpur–International
Akasa Air	Abu Dhabi, Ahmedabad, Bengaluru, Mumbai, Port Blair
Alliance Air	Hyderabad
Biman Bangladesh Airlines	Dhaka
British Airways	London–Heathrow
Cathay Pacific	Hong Kong
Emirates	Dubai–International
Ethiopian Airlines	Addis Ababa
Etihad Airways	Abu Dhabi
FitsAir	Colombo–Bandaranaike (resumes 15 December 2026)
Gulf Air	Bahrain
IndiGo	Abu Dhabi, Agartala, Ahmedabad, Amritsar, Bangkok–Suvarnabhumi, Bengaluru, Bhubaneswar, Chandigarh, Coimbatore, Colombo–Bandaranaike, Dehradun, Delhi, Dhaka, Doha, Dubai–International, Durgapur, Ghaziabad, Goa–Dabolim, Goa–Mopa, Guwahati, Hubli, Hyderabad, Indore, Jaffna, Jaipur, Jammu, Kadapa, Kannur, Kanpur, Kochi, Kolkata, Kozhikode, Kuala Lumpur–International, Kuwait City, Lucknow, Madurai, Mangaluru, Mumbai, Mysore, Navi Mumbai, Patna, Penang, Port Blair, Pune, Raipur, Rajamahendravaram, Ranchi, Salem, Shirdi, Siliguri, Singapore, Surat, Thiruvananthapuram, Thoothukudi, Tiruchirappalli, Vadodara, Varanasi, Vijayawada, Visakhapatnam; Seasonal: Muscat
Jazeera Airways	Kuwait City
Kuwait Airways	Kuwait City
Lufthansa	Frankfurt
Malaysia Airlines	Kuala Lumpur–International
Myanmar Airways International	Yangon
Oman Air	Muscat
Qatar Airways	Doha
Royal Brunei Airlines	Bandar Seri Begawan
SalamAir	Muscat
Scoot	Singapore
Singapore Airlines	Singapore
SpiceJet	Ahmedabad, Bengaluru, Goa–Mopa, Hyderabad, Kochi, Kolkata, Mumbai, Patna, Pune, Shimoga (ends 21 November 2026)
SriLankan Airlines	Colombo–Bandaranaike
Thai AirAsia	Bangkok–Don Mueang, Phuket
Thai Airways International	Bangkok–Suvarnabhumi
Thai Lion Air	Bangkok–Don Mueang
US-Bangla Airlines	Dhaka

=== Cargo ===
Airlines	Destinations
Afcom Cargo	Bangkok–Suvarnabhumi
Blue Dart Aviation	Ahmedabad, Bengaluru, Delhi, Hyderabad, Kolkata, Mumbai-Shivaji
Cathay Cargo	Hong Kong
Ethiopian Airlines Cargo	Addis Ababa, Hong Kong
Etihad Cargo	Abu Dhabi, Shanghai–Pudong
Emirates SkyCargo	Dubai–Al Maktoum
Hong Kong Air Cargo	Hong Kong
K-Mile Air	Bangkok–Suvarnabhumi
Longhao Airlines	Zhengzhou
Lufthansa Cargo	Frankfurt, Hong Kong
MASkargo	Kuala Lumpur–International
Oman Air Cargo	Muscat
Qatar Airways Cargo	Doha
SF Airlines	Chengdu–Tianfu, Ezhou, Shenzhen
Sichuan Airlines Cargo	Chengdu–Tianfu
Singapore Airlines Cargo	Amsterdam, Sharjah, Singapore
Turkish Cargo	Colombo–Bandaranaike, Istanbul
YTO Cargo Airlines	Guangzhou, Kunming, Nanning

== Statistics ==
Busiest domestic routes from MAA (2023–24)
Rank	Airport	Carriers	Passengers
1	Mumbai, Maharashtra	Air India, Akasa Air, IndiGo	1,235,465
2	Delhi	Air India, IndiGo, SpiceJet	1,162,421
3	Bengaluru, Karnataka	Air India, Air India Express, IndiGo	655,054
4	Hyderabad, Telangana	Air India, Air India Express, Alliance Air, IndiGo, SpiceJet	644,863
5	Kolkata, West Bengal	Air India, Air India Express, IndiGo	428,257
6	Coimbatore, Tamil Nadu	Air India, IndiGo	419,001
7	Pune, Maharashtra	Air India Express, IndiGo, SpiceJet	291,171
8	Kochi, Kerala	Air India Express, IndiGo, SpiceJet	277,367
9	Port Blair, Andaman and Nicobar	Air India Express, Akasa Air, IndiGo, SpiceJet	252,302
10	Madurai, Tamil Nadu	Air India, IndiGo, SpiceJet	203,804

Busiest international routes from MAA (2023–24)
Rank	Airport	Carriers	Passengers
1	Dubai, United Arab Emirates	Air India, Emirates, IndiGo	501,938
2	Singapore	Air India, Air India Express, IndiGo, Scoot, Singapore Airlines	438,218
3	Colombo–Bandaranaike, Sri Lanka	Air India, FitsAir, IndiGo, SriLankan Airlines	398,469
4	Kuala Lumpur, Malaysia	Air Asia, IndiGo, Malaysia Airlines	318,567
5	Abu Dhabi, United Arab Emirates	Air Arabia, Etihad Airways, IndiGo	280,907
6	Doha, Qatar	IndiGo, Qatar Airways	152,972
7	Kuwait City, Kuwait	IndiGo, Jazeera Airways, Kuwait Airways	146,134
8	Muscat, Oman	Air India Express, Oman Air, SalamAir	132,349
9	Bangkok–Suvarnabhumi, Thailand	IndiGo, Thai Airways International	83,961
10	Frankfurt, Germany	Lufthansa	76,886

== Ground transport ==
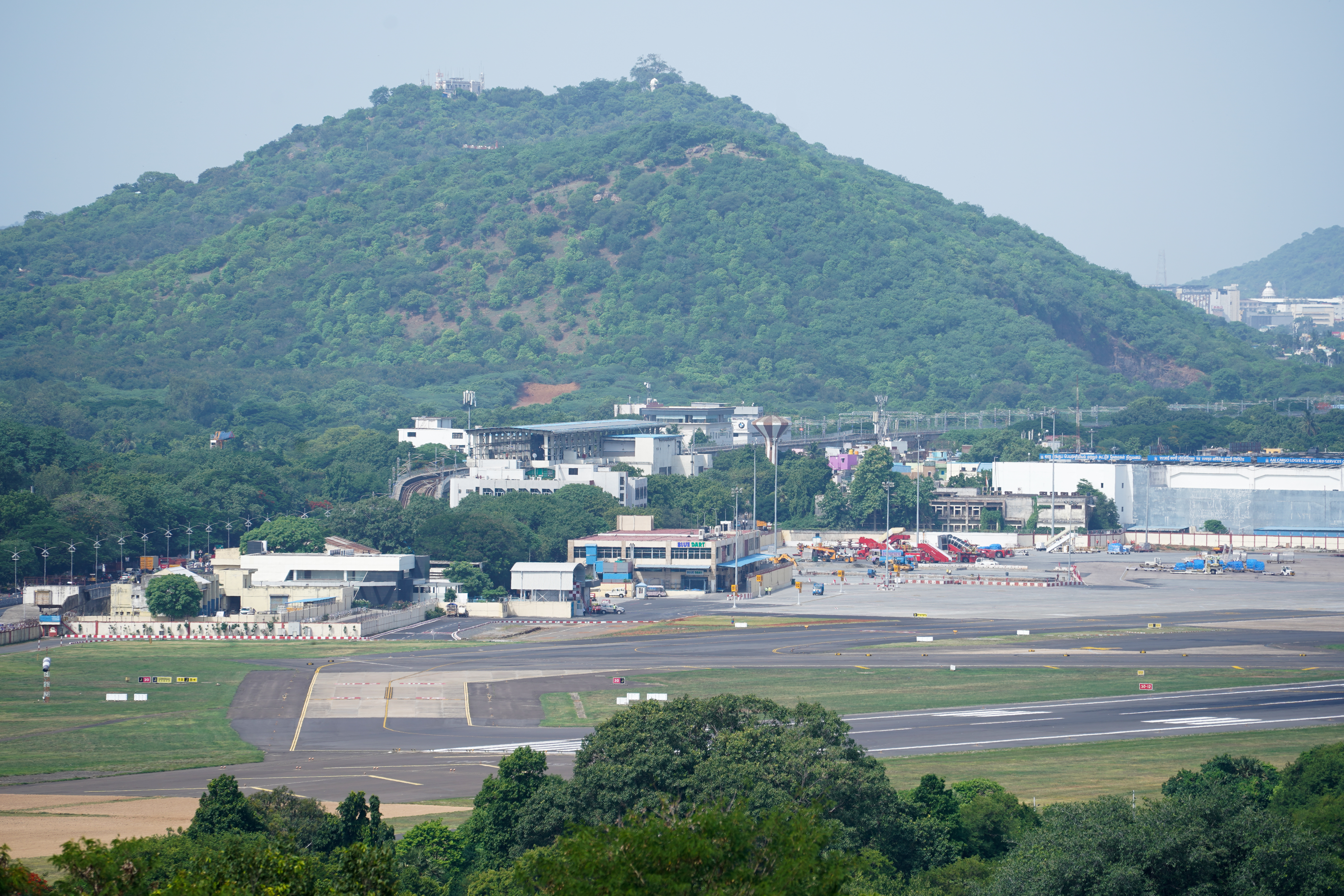
Tirusulam railway station as seen from the airport

The airport is situated on the Grand Southern Trunk Road (National Highway 32) with a flyover at the entrance of the airport separating traffic. Public bus transport is handled by Metropolitan Transport Corporation (MTC) of the state-run Tamil Nadu State Transport Corporation (TNSTC). The airport is served by several taxi and rental car companies. In addition, ride-sharing companies Ola Cabs and Uber operate outside the terminal.

The airport is served by Tirusulam railway station on the Suburban railway network. The airport metro station of the Chennai Metro connects the airport. Shuttle services between the metro station and the terminals are provided for the passengers. The concourse of the metro station is directly linked to the passenger terminals. The Tirusulam suburban train station is also integrated with the metro station and the airport.

== Awards ==
The airport was ranked in the third place as the Best Airport by Size in the category of 15–25 million passengers per annum by Airports Council International in 2017. It was awarded as the Best Tourist Friendly Airport by Tamil Nadu Tourism from the Ministry of Tourism two consecutive times, in 2016 and 2018. It was awarded the Gold Award by the survey of RoSPA Health and Safety Awards for ensuring proper hygienic conditions and safety from accidents and incidents, as well as the Sword of Honour by the British Safety Council for ensuring safety and security, both for the airport's Phase-II of modernisation, in 2020. It was ranked in the eighth place among the most punctual airports in the world, globally, by ensuring timely takeoffs and landings to and from the airport, in 2021 by Cirium, an aviation data analytics company.

== Accidents and incidents ==
- On 7 January 1974, an Antonov AN-12 of the Indian Air Force crashed on take-off at the airport due to engine failure. There were no fatalities but the aircraft was damaged beyond recovery.
- On 26 April 1979, a Boeing 737-200 operated by Indian Airlines (registration VT-ECR) from Trivandrum had a mid-air explosion during descent. The aircraft crash landed more than 2,500 ft (760 m) beyond the runway threshold. There were 14 injuries and no fatalities but the aircraft was destroyed due to subsequent fire.
- On 2 August 1984 there was a bomb blast caused by the Tamil Eelam Army, a Sri Lankan Tamil militant group. 33 people were killed and 27 others were injured in this bomb blast.
- On 29 September 1986, Indian Airlines flight IC 571, an Airbus A300 (registration VT-ELV), on a flight from Madras to Mumbai, aborted take-off due to a bird-strike and suffered a runway excursion. No fatalities were reported but the aircraft was damaged beyond repair.
- On 5 March 1999, Air France flight 6745, an ex-UTA Boeing 747-2B3F freighter (registration F-GPAN) from Paris crash-landed and caught fire. The five crew members were rescued by the airport fire service, before the aircraft burned out.
- On 15 June 2007, a British Aerospace ATP freighter (registration VT-FFB) operated by First Flight Couriers crash landed at the airport due to landing gear collapse and the aircraft was damaged beyond repair.

== See also ==
- Air transport in India
- Airports in India
- List of airlines of India
- Transport in Chennai
