= List of Sri Lankan Tamil militant groups =

Following is a list of Sri Lankan Tamil militant groups.

== Student organizations ==
- TSL – Tamil Students League [Tamil Manavar Peravai] (1970), founded by Ponnuthurai Satyaseelan. See also, TYL.
- TYL – Tamil Youth League [Tamil Ilaignar Peravai] (1973), the progenitor of Eelam Tamil militancy.
- GUES – General Union of Eelam Students, part of EROS and forerunner of EPRLF.

== Major groups ==
- LTTE Liberation Tigers of Tamil Eelam - was the only remaining armed Tamil nationalist group, after successfully liquidating other groups. LTTE was defeated militarily by the Sri Lankan armed forces in May 2009. The leader was V. Prabakaran.
- EPRLF Eelam People's Revolutionary Liberation Front - a part of the TNA. The leader was K. Pathmanabha
- TELO Tamil Eelam Liberation Organization -once decimated by the LTTE, part of TNA The leader was Kutimani(nickname) & Sri Sabaratnam
- PLOTE People's Liberation Organisation of Tamil Eelam - a minor standalone political party accused of being a paramilitary; the PLOTE, unlike other groups, vehemently denies this. The leader was Uma Maheswaran
- EROS Eelam Revolutionary Organisation of Students - largely active in the 1970s and 1980s. The leader was V.Balakumar
- ENDLF Eelam National Democratic Liberation Front - created with the help of the IPKF, now active in India in refugee settlements in Orissa. The leader was Paranthan Rajan
- EPDP Eelam People's Democratic Party - pro-government group and a political party accused of being a paramilitary The leader is Douglas Devananda (Former member of EPRLF left to form EPDP)
- TMVP - a LTTE splinter group, a pro-government group accused of being a para-military organization
- ICMM - Indo Ceylon Merger Movement (Inththiya Ilanggai Innaippu Iyakkam). (1971–1980)
- TNT - Tamil New Tigers (Puthiya Thamil Pulikal). (1972–1976) predecessor to LTTE
- TLO - Tamil Liberation Organization. (1974–1978)

== Militant fronts ==
- Upsurging People's Force - active in the North in the 2000s (decade).
- Ellalan Padai - A front organization of LTTE.
- Ravanan Padai - Considered to be a front of LTTE.
- Senan Padai - Considered to be a front of LTTE splinter group Tamil Makkal Viduthalaip Pulikal. Officials of the Tamil Makkal Viduthalaip Pulikal have denied any connections.
- Seerum Padai - A shadowy group calling itself Seerum Padai claimed responsibility for murder of Member of Parliament N. Raviraj. The LTTE splinter group TMVP has claimed no connections with it.
- People's Liberation Army - Supposed new Sri Lankan militant group operation in Eastern Province, Sri Lanka
- Jihad - an armed Muslim organization opposed to the LTTE

== Political front parties ==
- TSK – Tamilar Suya-Aadchi Kazhakam (1969), of V. Navaratnam; a splinter group of ITAK.
- ETOM – Eela Thamilar Ottrumai Munnani (1960), of Chellappah Suntharalingam; became a minor constituent of the TULF.
- DPLF – Democratic People's Liberation Front, the political wing of PLOTE, of D.Siddarthan.
- PFLT – People's Front of Liberation Tigers (1989), now defunct political party of the LTTE.
- ENLF – Eelam National Liberation Front (1985–1986), a short-lived union of the LTTE, EROS, TELO and EPRLF. LTTE wiggled out of this union.
- TELF – Tamil Eelam Liberation Front (1982), of S.C. Chandrahasan, M.K. Eelaventhan, journalist Kovai Mahesan and S. A. Tharmalingam; a splinter group of the TULF.
- ENDLF – Eelam National Democratic Liberation Front (1987), a group created by RAW from PLOTE, EPRLF and TELO.

== Minor groups ==
- ELDF – Eelam Liberation Defence Front.
- ELO – Eelam Liberation Organisation (1975).
- ELT – Eelam Liberation Tigers.
- EM – Eagle Movement, of Gnanavel.
- ERCP – Eelam Revolutionary Communist Party.
- GATE – Guerrilla Army of Tamil Eelam.
- NLFT – National Liberation Front of Tamileelam, which according to Taraki, was a small but influential Maoist group based largely in Jaffna, which "drove down the road to perdition by splitting hairs over the question of whether it should first build an armed wing or a mass political movement."
- PLFT – People's Liberation Front of Tamil Eelam, a splinter group of NLFTE.
- PLA – People's Liberation Army, the military wing of EPRLF, Led by current EPDP leader Douglas Devananda. Important achievement of the PLA was the 1984 kidnapping of American couple Stanley and Mary Allen from Columbus, Ohio, in Jaffna.
- PLP – People's Liberation Party.
- RCG – Red Crescent Guerrillas.
- RELO – Revolutionary Eelam Liberation Organisation.
- RFTE – Red Front of Tamil Eelamists. (1984)
- RW – Revolutionary Warriors.
- SRSL – Socialist Revolutionary Social Liberation
- TEA – Tamil Eelam Army (1983), of Panagoda Maheswaran.
- TEC – Tamil Eelam Commando.
- TEDF – Tamil Eelam Defence Front.
- TEEF – Tamil Eelam Eagles Front.
- TELA – Tamil Eelam Liberation Army (1982) of Oberoi Thevan; a splinter group of TELO. After the assassination of Thevan in 1983 by the LTTE, TELA was absorbed by PLOTE.
- TELC – Tamil Eelam Liberation Cobras (1983), a short-lived Batticaloa-based group. As per Taraki, "It was widely known as the Cobra Army (Naaha Padai)".
- TELE – Tamil Eelam Liberation Extremists, which Taraki identified as "led by one 'TELE Jegan.' He was shot dead by the LTTE.
- TELG – Tamil Eelam Liberation Guerrillas.
- TENA – Tamil Eelam National Army (1983), of Amirthalingam Baheerathan.
- TERO – Tamil Eelam Revolutionary Organisation, of Sudan Ramesh; a splinter group of TELO.
- TERPLA – Tamil Eelam Revolutionary People's Liberation Army, of Thangarasa.
- TESS – Tamil Eelam Security Service.
- TLO – Tamil Liberation Organisation (1969), the progenitor of TELO.
- TNC – Tamil National Council (1989).
- TNT – Tamil New Tigers (1972–1976); renamed the LTTE.
- TPCU – Tamil People's Command Unit.
- TPDF – Tamil People's Democratic Front.
- TPSF – Tamil People's Security Front.
- TPSO – Tamil People's Security Organisation.
- TEBM – Tamil Eelam Blood Movement.
