= Chennai Airport Flyover =

Bridge in India

Location
- Chennai, India
- Coordinates: 12.981569°N 80.166968°E

Construction
- Type: Flyover
- Spans: 27
- Lanes: 3, one-way traffic
- Constructed: 2005–08 by National Highways Authority of India
- Opened: 19 October 2008
- Maximum width: 11 metres (36 ft)

Chennai Airport Flyover is a 1.6 km long flyover in front of the Chennai International Airport in Chennai city.

== Flyover Details ==
The flyover is 1.6 km long three-laned flyover for One-way traffic for vehicles that proceed from Pallavaram to Alandur near Kathipara Junction. It is built by the National Highway Authority of India (NHAI) at a cost of ₹ 970 million. It was opened for traffic on 19 October 2008 by M. Karunanidhi, the then chief minister of Tamil Nadu.

The NHAI also intends to provide bus bays for the flyover as well as on ground level with escalators and elevators connecting both. It has invited tenders for the same.
