= Hotel d'Angelis =

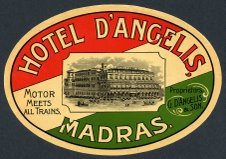
- Luggage label

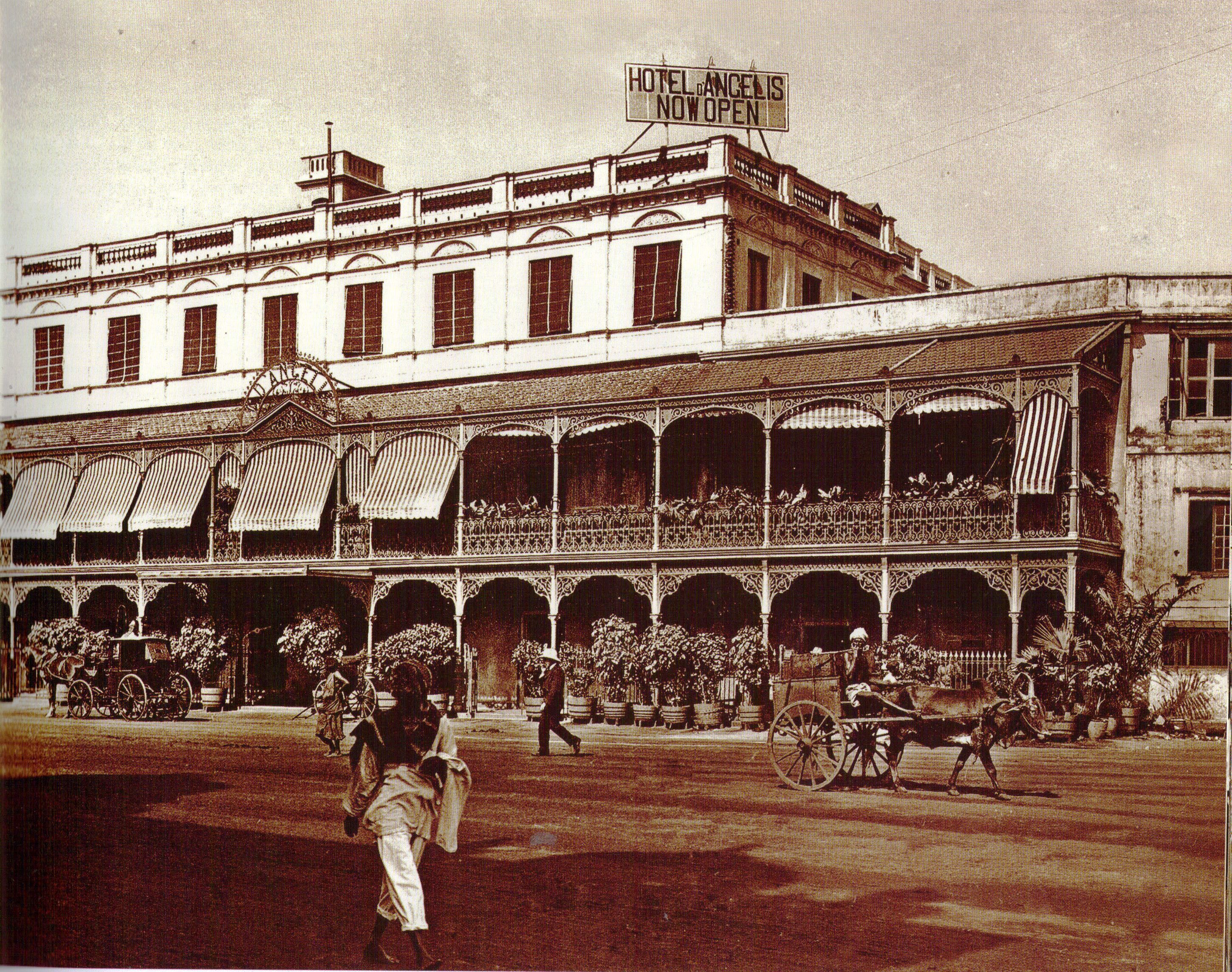
- Hotel D'Angelis in the 1900s
- Former names: Hotel Bosotto 1928-1950 Airlines Hotel 1950-1970's Bata store 1970s-2007

General information
- Architectural style: Neo-classical Italianate, Victorian
- Location: Chennai, India, Madras, Mount Road
- Opened: 1906
- Closed: 1927
- Demolished: 2018
- Owner: Giacomo d'Angelis

Height
- Architectural: three-floor pavilion hotel with interior courtyard

Design and construction
- Architect: Giacomo d'Angelis
- Known for: Luxury hotel and restaurant

Other information
- Seating capacity: 700-800 people
- Facilities: Bar, mezzanine, billiards hall, restaurant, café and hotel
- First restaurant and hotel in Madras to have electrical lifts

Hotel d'Angelis was a luxurious Parisian-style hotel and restaurant established in 1906 by Giacomo D'Angelis at Mount Road, Madras, British India, serving French, Italian and continental cuisines, remaining in operation through the early to mid-20th century. It is considered to have spearheaded the introduction of modern hotel technology in South Asia.

== History ==
Giacomo D'Angelis, born in Messina, was a trained French confectioner who arrived in Madras in 1880 and set up a small store, Maison Française, a catering and confectionary business in Mount Road. He announced himself as a "manufacturing confectioner, glacie &.C, general purveyor and mess contractor". He was one of the first to supply large-scale catering for parties at that time in India, which contemporaries like the Connemara Hotel did not provide. D'Angelis had also dealings in Ooty, where he served as hotelier and manager for Sylk's Hotel.

The firm was one of the first in British India to operate a catering service on such a large scale, and soon became a "first class caterer". It was appointed the official caterer to the governor of Madras, Lord Ampthill, to supply to all official banquets and soirées.

Subsequently, D'Angelis earned a name for himself in the circles of Madras, and in 1906 founded Hotel d'Angelis at Mount Road and Blacker's Road junction. Initially a small restaurant in a three-story long building with wrought iron balustrades and balconies, the hotel was the first in Madras to have an electric lift, hot water taps, electric fans, imported tiles, ice-making plant and cold storage.

By 1908, the hotel had gained immense popularity in Madras, especially among the European community, and became a luxurious restaurant in the heart of the bustle of Madras, emulating Parisian cafés.

The hotel was famous enough during its heyday that it was visited by King George V and Queen Mary in 1906, during their royal tour of India, as prince and princess of Wales, in 1912 by Nizam mir Osman Ali Khan, by the Raja of Bobili, Lord Pentland, and the Maharajah of Vizianagarm. D'Angelis's stunt with a self-constructed aircraft in 1910, where he flew a small airplane in Island grounds in Madras, the first flight in Asia by accounts, created a new sort of popularity for him and his hotel.

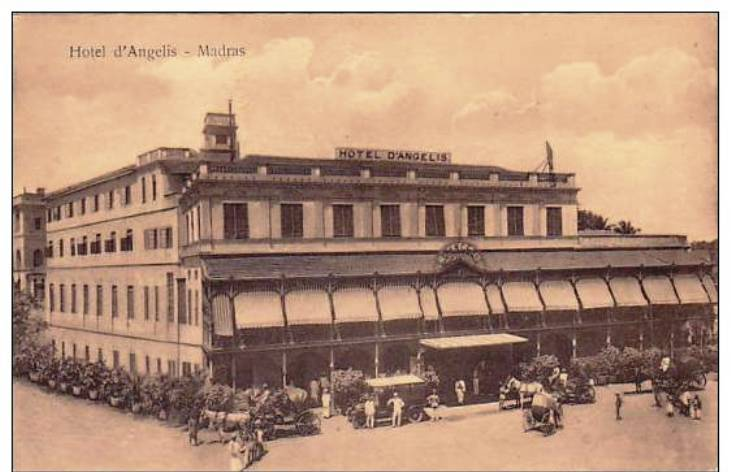
Hotel D'Angelis in the 1910s, during its heyday

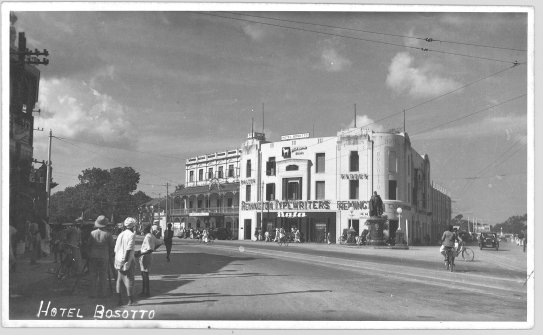
(Hotel D'Angelis) as seen in the early to mid-1950s, right after it became Airlines Hotel and Bata showroom

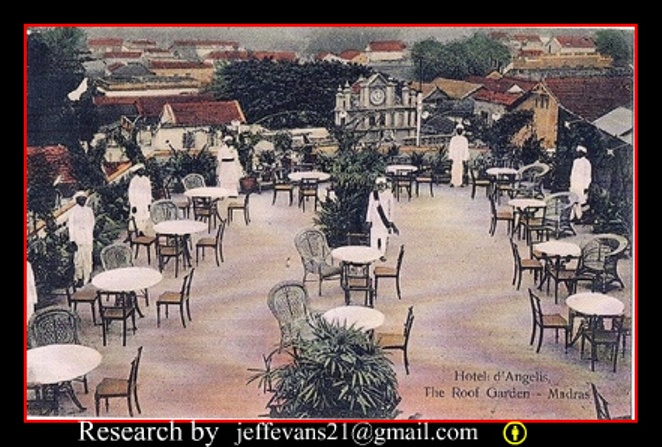
Rooftop garden café at Hotel D'Angelis, 1900s

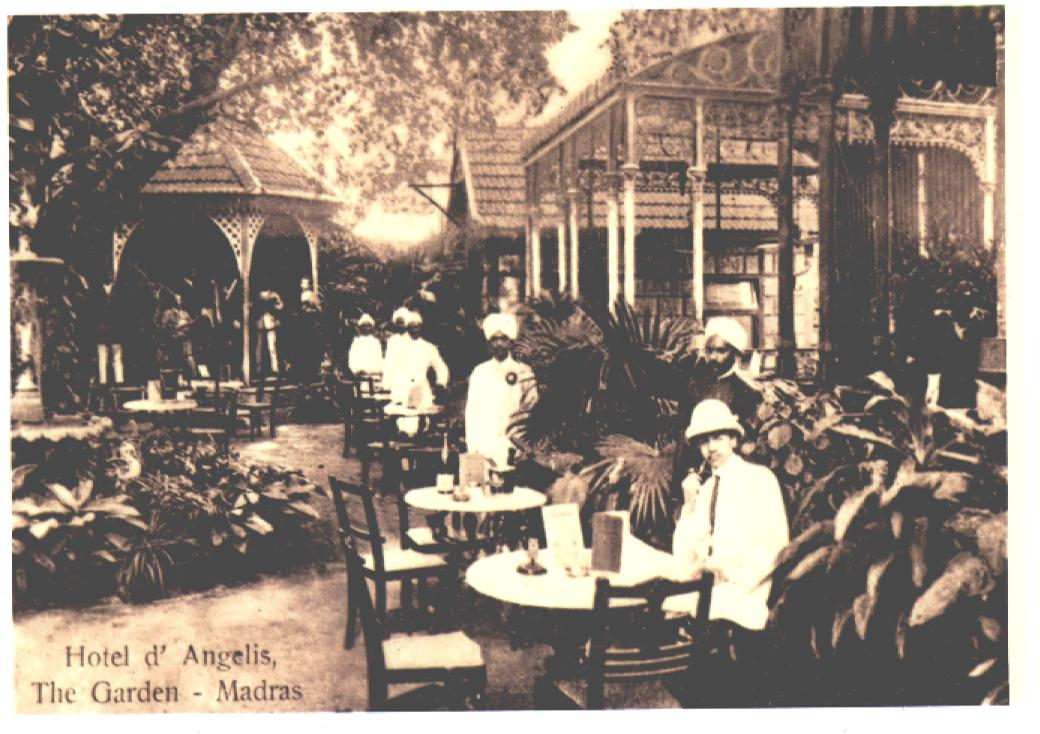
Hotel D'Angelis garden café

However, in 1919 Giacomo, who had taken a holiday in Carignano, Turin, Italy, died. A year later, his son, Carlo D'Angelis, drowned. Giacomo's daughter Marianna took management of the Sylk's Hotel in Ooty which still was within the family, and renamed it The Savoy in 1925. It ran under the Spencer's and Taj group after 1943. After the death of Carlo and Giacomo in 1920, the D'Angelises decided to sell the hotel. Giacomo's youngest son Louis travelled from New York to settle the family's affairs. The family sold it to another Italian, Attilio Bosotto, in 1928. He renovated the building, replacing the Parisian iron-wrought railings and signature style of D'Angelis with an Art-Deco facade and fittings, which was a popular style in the 1920s–1930s, and renamed it Hotel Bosotto.

The hotel remained popular, and was considered fashionable due to its Nouveau furnishing. It hosted Douglas Jardine and his cricket team in 1934, during their 1934 world tour. The Sassoons from Bombay set up a five-star emporium inside the hotel for the upper class clientele. D'Angelis, now renamed Hotel Bosotto, was Madras's most renowned hotel and restaurant until 1937, when the Connemara Hotel, which had taken three years to refurbish and go through refittings, reopened, and Hotel Bosotto began to wane in popularity.

In 1950, the Hotel Bosotto, now after independence and changing customs, was sold to the Airlines Hotel, which had a restaurant in one part and which also functioned in another part as a Bata Shoe store showroom. The building was not well-maintained. It functioned until 1983 when a fire broke out, after which upkeep and functioning became rare and uncertain. The property was purchased by the Akshaya Group in 2007, and the building remained in a derelict state until its demolition in 2018. Some parts of the facade of the building remain, including the walls and some ruined entry arches, serving to mark the circumference of the land as a boundary fence.

== Architecture and style ==
The hotel was built in a Neoclassical and Italianate fashion in 1905–1906, with Victorian and Beaux-arts influences and wrought-iron railings and balustrades, across two floors. The building was originally built using lime mortar, brick and granite, and occupied a space of an acre or more in prime central Madras. The architectural style was preserved until 1928.

After 1928, the building underwent a complete overhaul. Reinforced cement was used to make front Art-Deco facades and beams, and it was redesigned as an Art-Deco building, which it remained until its demolition in 2018.

=== Rooftop garden ===
The original hotel, under Giacomo D'Angelis, had a rooftop garden above the three-story restaurant, which served as a café environment, with wrought-iron chairs and tea tables and cushioned seats, potted parlour palm, other flowers and plants, an iron-grille work pavilion, and a scenic view of Madras, with cool evening air passing through.

=== Parisian garden café ===
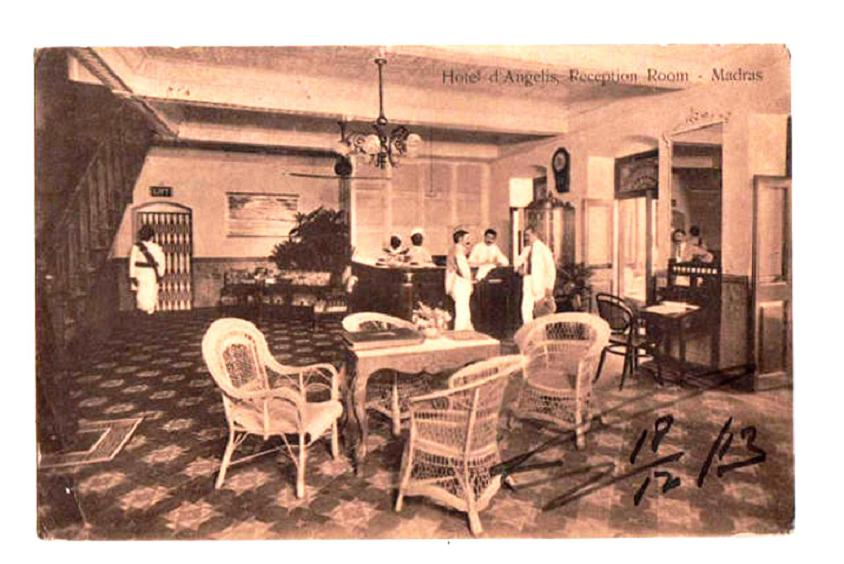
Reception hall

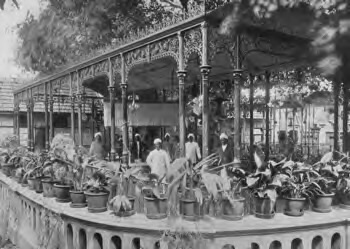
Garden pavilion

A prominent part of the Hotel D'Angelis was its courtyard café, an expansive courtyard, with lines of iron chairs, and scroll work tables, with tall trees, vegetation and iron grille pavilions fashioned to block out the heat, all this combined gave an almost Parisian feel to the interiors of D'Angelis, making it popular. It was reportedly poplar among the "madames" of Madras during that period, and became a hub for social life and society in Madras.

=== Mezzanine and billiards room ===
The hotel was known for its black and white checkered imported Italian marble tiles, with iron-grille balustrades onlooking Mount Road, which became a vantage point to gather and see processions and important events for the wealthy of Madras during the colonial era, acting as a mezzanine and balcony. The wide, three-table billiard room catered to the British administrators, and was famously first played by King George V (then Prince of Wales) in 1906.

The hotel had large and airy foyers and entrance halls, with plants and ventilation, which many favoured over Connemara Hotel. The hotel reportedly had its own ice cream-making plant with custom-made machines from Italy, in-house ice storage, and a famous daily high tea service at 3:30 PM. It had an expansive bar with expensive Baron de Rothschild wines being stored and served for only the most elite clientele.

The d'Angelis was one of the first in all of South Asia to introduce an elevator to a restaurant and hotel.

== See also ==
- Hotels in Chennai
- Bharat Insurance Building
- Higginbotham's

== Bibliography ==
- Muthiah, S. (2004). Madras Rediscovered. East West Books (Madras) Pvt Ltd. pp. 65–66. ISBN 81-88661-24-4.
- Playne, Somerset; J. W. Bond; Arnold Wright (1914). Southern India: Its History, People, Commerce, and Industrial Resources. pp. 151–152.
