= Taj Connemara =

Luxury hotel in Chennai, India

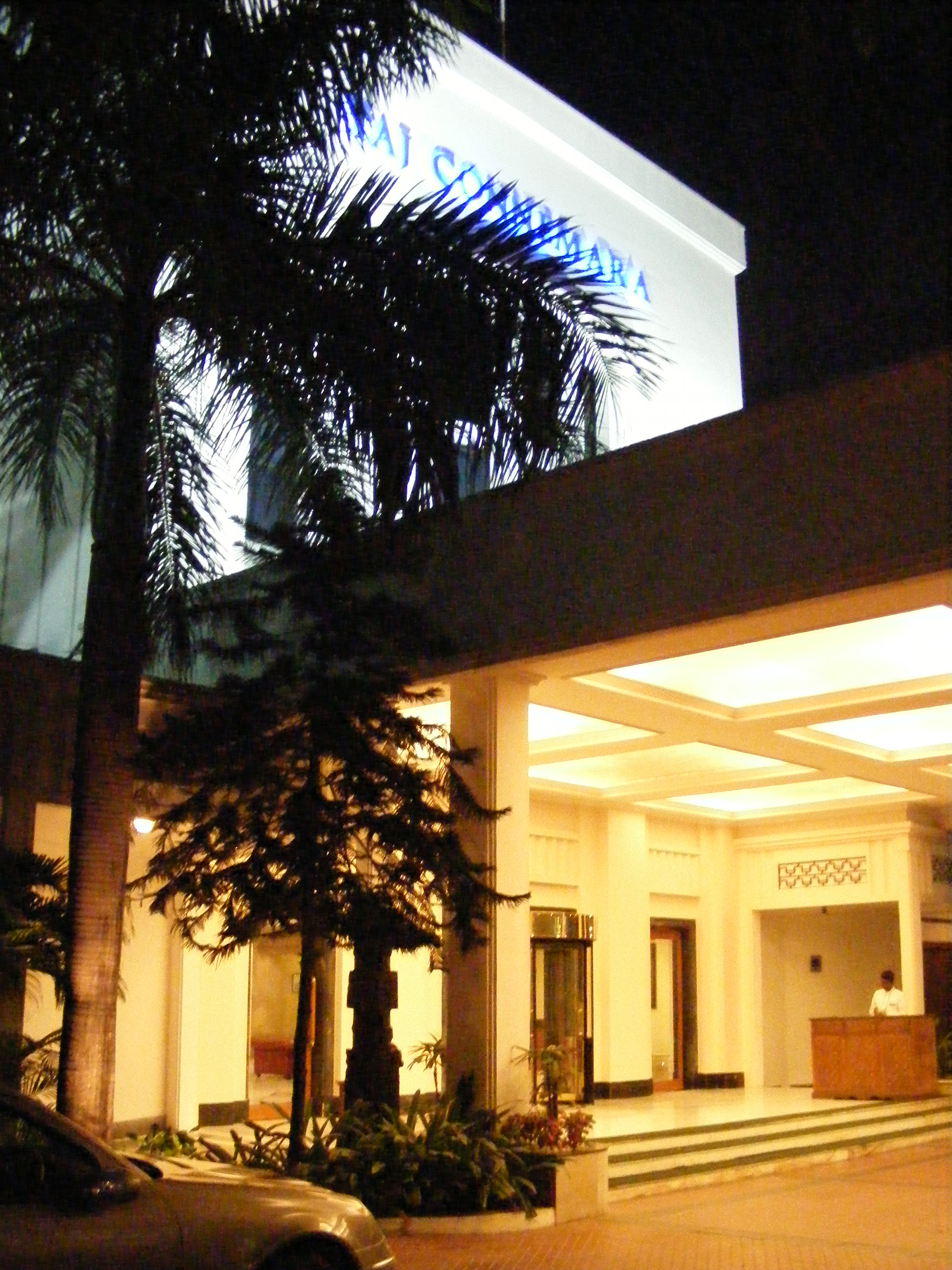
- Taj Connemara in 2007.
- Interactive map of the Taj Connemara area
- Hotel chain: Taj Hotels

General information
- Location: Chennai, India, 2, Binny Road, off Anna Salai; Chennai, Tamil Nadu 600 002
- Coordinates: 13.062809°N 80.261508°E
- Opening: 1854; 172 years ago (as the Imperial Hotel)
- Operator: Taj Hotels

Other information
- Number of rooms: 147
- Number of suites: 4
- Number of restaurants: 2

Website
- Taj Connemara

Taj Connemara, Chennai is a five-star hotel in Chennai, India. It is a heritage hotel in Chennai. Classified under the Taj Group's business hotels section, the 127-year-old hotel is considered the oldest hotel in the city.

== History ==
The property of Taj Connemara was originally a house bought by John Binny from The Nawab of Arcot in 1799. The property was later bought by T. Somasundara Mudalyar and built as the Imperial Hotel in 1854 under the proprietorship of Triplicane Rathinavelu Mudaliar, renamed Albany in 1886 when it was leased to two other Mudaliar brothers, and re-established as The Connemara in 1890, named after the then Madras Governor during 1881–1886, Robert Bourke, baron of Connemara, a rural area in County Galway in the west of Ireland, later becoming a Spencer's hotel. In 1891, Eugene Oakshott, owner of Spencer's, then a little shop near Anna Circle, bought the hotel and its nine acres to build a showroom. Oakshott wanted to give Spencer's a facelift, so he decided to build one of Asia's biggest departmental store. In the 1930s, James Stiven, director of Spencer's, modernised the hotel starting in 1934, and the modernisation was completed in 1937. It sported an art deco look when it was reopened in 1937. According to a hotel press release, the 1937 renovation, estimated at ₹575,000, boasted about its "cool refreshing air delivered through the newest air conditioning apparatus." According to the first published tariff of the hotel, the cost of a room on single occupancy was ₹10 with breakfast and that of a room with all meals was ₹17.80.

Spencer's leased the Connemara to the Taj Group in 1974. The tower block and linking pool was designed by architect Geoffrey Bawa in 1974, and the work was completed in 1977. The deluxe wing of the hotel was destroyed almost completely in the "Friday the Thirteenth" fire in February 1981, which broke out in the Spencer's building. However, the main building of the hotel remained unharmed because of the high-rise wall in between the two buildings. In 1984, the Taj Group of Hotels acquired the hotel for a 100-year lease from the Spencer's Group. The hotel saw two renovations in 1990 and 1995. The hotel was again renovated in 2004 and 2005, when the hotel was re-designed with the launch of the loud Distil bar and chic pan Asian restaurant Hip Asia, It is also when 65 rooms in the hotel were renovated.

In 2008, historian S. Muthiah wrote a book on the heritage of the hotel, A Tradition of Madras that is Chennai—The Taj Connemara, which reproduces an advertisement from 1880 that states the hotel, called The Imperial Hotel then, promises "extensive premises… cool and fitted with every convenience" and wines from the "celebrated house of Messrs. McDowell & Co." The book gives a rare collection of photographs of old Madras roads, buildings, interiors of the hotels and the hotel's tariff since 1939. According to Muthiah, the British rated Connemara as one of the best hotels in the world. Although the building was purportedly 200 years old by the turn of the twenty-first century, dating back to the original garden house bought by John Binny, according to Muthiah nothing of the old structure remains. The oldest part of the hotel is that built in the 1880s and 1890s.

In September 2010, the hotel was rebranded and renamed as Vivanta by Taj—Connemara, Chennai.

The hotel closed on 1 November 2016 for a major makeover to re-create the theme of its early past and reopen as an intimate high-end luxury hotel. Aiming at recreating old menus and cuisines, the renovation would retain only the Verandah and Raintree restaurants, refurbishing all the rooms, lobby and banquet halls to look more like the hotels early years. The renovation would be made by the Mumbai-based engineering consultancy Structwel Designers and Consultants Private Limited. Then, London-based designer Susan Freeman, a specialist in historical renovation was hired to work on the rooms and the restaurants.

The hotel reopened on 20 October 2018 as the Taj Connemara. The renovation took 22 months, cost 900 million Rupees, and involved 1400 workers. The renovation preserved the architectural influences of Classic Colonial, Art Deco and distinctive elements from architect Geoffrey Bawa's "Tropical Modernism" style. The Art Deco façade and interiors are the hotel's original features, including wooden carvings sourced from the 16th and 17th century temples of Mahabalipuram.

Given its centuries-old background, the hotel boasts some historical snippets:

- The stone pillars in the hotel's Raintree pathway and the wooden carvings in the grand staircase wall, both of which date back to the 16th and 17th centuries, are from old temples of Mahabalipuram.
- The lobby has a grand piano that dates back to 1922, which used to be played in the ballroom in the evenings during the post-war era, and is still played on weekdays.
- Nagavelli well, located in the hotel, never dries up even during the peak of summer when all other wells in the city dry up.
- The Lady Connemara Bar & Lounge is the city's first licensed bar.

== Location ==
Taj Connemara is located on the eastern banks of River Cooum on Binny Road, off Anna Salai, abutting the Spencer Plaza, one of the most prominent landmarks of Chennai.

== The hotel ==
Built on a 4.2-acre land, Taj Connemara has a total of 147 rooms, which include 143 double rooms and 4 suites. The hotel has 2 meeting rooms which include a ball room that can accommodate up to 400 people in a theatre style and up to 600 people for cocktails. The conference room of the hotel can accommodate up to 30 people in a theatre style. The restaurants in the hotel include The Verandah—a 24-hour coffee shop serving Indian, Continental and Thai food, The Lady Connemara Bar and Lounge—serving exotic cocktails, spirits, wines, beer and light snacks in a colonial ambiance, Raintree—an ethnic, open-air restaurant serving Chettinad cuisine from Tamil Nadu.

Greeneries in the hotel include a dramatic old raintree and two sturdy Nagavalli trees.

== Notable associations ==
For decades, the hotel has been integral to the functioning of several clubs and associations in the city. The Rotary Club of Madras has been meeting in the hotel every Tuesday at 1:00 p.m. since 10 May 1929, and plaque has been erected past the ballroom to mark this. The Wednesday Club has been gathering in the hotel since 1975, taking "the same table at Verandah every week, and always have the lunch buffet." The Madras Book Club has been meeting in the hotel since the 2000s.

== Awards and honors ==
In 2023, the hotel was recognized with "Top Hospitality Honors" at the 8th International Hospitality Day organised by the International Hospitality Council (IHC) London and the International Institute of Hotel Management (IIHM).

== See also ==
- Hotels in Chennai
- Hotel d'Angeli's
- Heritage structures in Chennai
