= Giacomo D'Angelis =

Giacomo D'Angelis was a Corsican-Indian hotelier and aviation pioneer who piloted the first powered airplane flight in Asia in Madras (Chennai), India on 10 March 1910. The flight reportedly occurred nine months prior to another published account of a flight in Allahabad. D'Angelis flew a self-built aircraft.

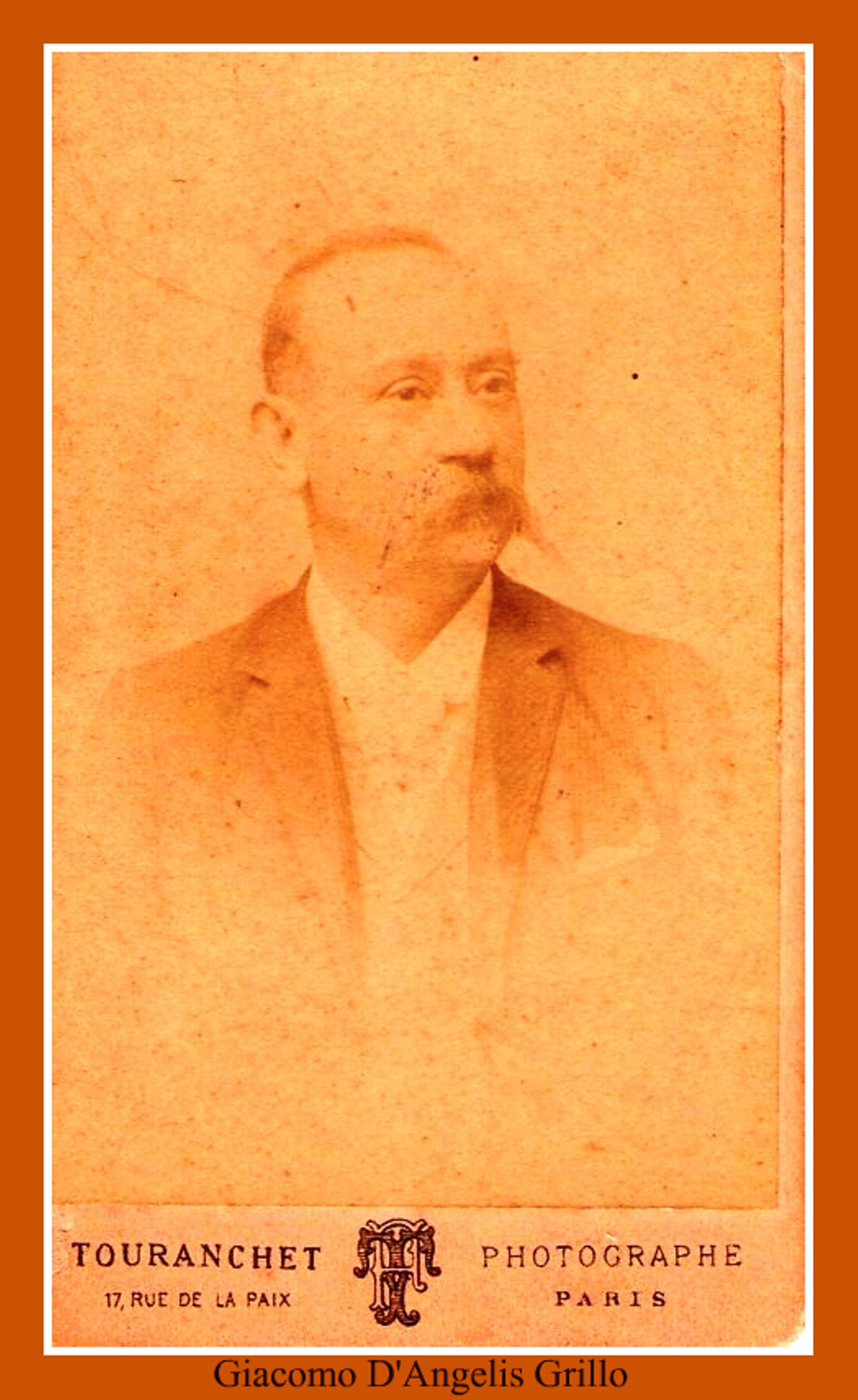
Giacomo D'Angelis

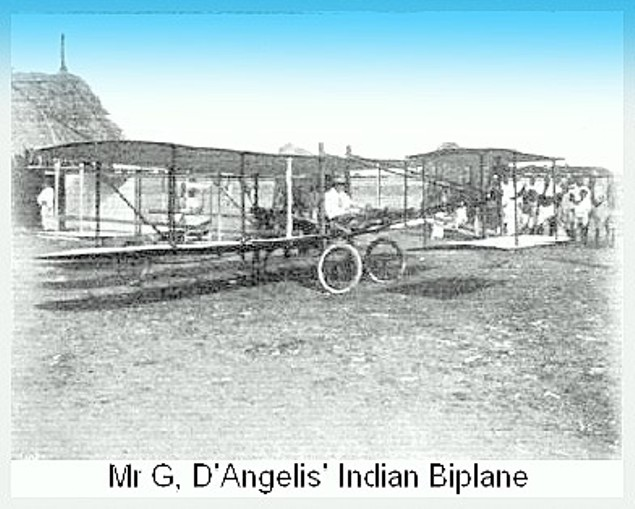
Giacomo D'Angelis's Biplane in 1910

== Life ==
Giacomo D’Angelis, a confectioner from Messina, Italy, arrived in Madras in 1880 and opened his "Maison Francaise" as chef de cuisine, and his excellent service soon enabled him to open a small hotel in 1906, the latter Heritage Hotel d'Angelis at Anna Salai, the former Mountain Road, in Chennai.

== D'Angelis 's biplane ==
The biplane has been built by D'Angelis entirely from his own designs, experimenting with a small horse-power engine. D'Angelis seems to have been inspired by Louis Blériot who was the first to fly across the English Channel in July 1909. D'Angelis tested his aeroplane in Pallavaram, Tamil Nadu, and then arranged a public viewing in March 1910 reported by the local newspapers.

A'Dangeli's made its flight on March 26, 1910: "We are posting you what we believe is the first aeroplane in India, which has been constructed by one of our customers, Mr. G. D'Angelis of Madras. The machine has been built by our friend entirely from his own design, and we understand that although upto the present he has been experimenting with a small horse-power engine, the results given by this are so satisfactory that with a higher horse-power he anticipates being able to make long and consecutive flights." The aircraft's engine may have been supplied by E. and A Levetus, and Co. India Weekly mentioned that the motor of the biplane had been built by Samuel John Green, an engineer of the Simpson's company.
