= Tamil Eelam Army =

Defunct Tamil separatist group in Sri Lanka

The Tamil Eelam Army is a defunct Tamil separatist group in Sri Lanka. It was founded by Panagoda Maheswaran. It was implicated in a bomb attack against a Sri Lankan airliner at Madras airport in India. It was disbanded after that incident.

== See also ==
- Sri Lankan Civil War
- Tamil Eelam
- List of Sri Lankan Tamil militant groups
- Meenambakkam bomb blast
