= Upsurging People's Force =

Militant organization

The Upsurging People's Force (Tamil: பொங்கி எழும் மக்கள் படை) was a militant group in Sri Lanka.

The group was unknown until February 2006, when it claimed responsibility for a series of attacks on Sri Lankan army and navy cadre in the north and east of Sri Lanka in December 2005 and January 2006. It claimed responsibility for a series of further claymore mine attacks on soldiers and police officers on 15 April 2006, but has not issued any public communiques since then.

== See also ==
- Paramilitary organisations based in Sri Lanka
