= Panagoda Maheswaran =

Sri Lankan Tamil militant (born 1955)

Panagoda Maheswaran (born 1955 as Thambapillai Maheswaran) was a Sri Lankan Tamil militant who founded and led the Tamil Eelam Army. He studied chemical engineering from the University of London and was an expert in explosives. His name Panagoda came as he was jailed in Panagoda Cantonment in the outskirts of Colombo, whence he made an audacious escape. He attempted to blow up an Air Lanka aircraft in 1984.

He died some time in 2024.
