= 2010 Transnational Constituent Assembly of Tamil Eelam election =

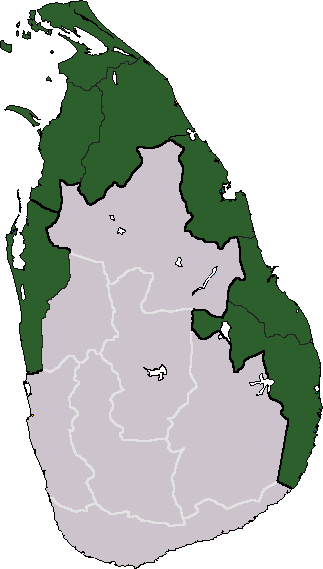
Area claimed for Tamil Eelam

In 2010 elections were held in Sri Lankan Tamil diaspora communities to elect members to the first Transnational Constituent Assembly of Tamil Eelam.

== Background ==
One of the main recommendations of the Advisory Committee on the Formation of a Provisional Transnational Government of Tamil Eelam was that a Transnational Constituent Assembly be formed consisting of 135 members. Of these, 115 would be elected and the remaining 20 shall consist of delegates selected by the elected assembly to represent regions where elections aren't feasible.

The distribution of the 115 elected representatives is: Australia 10; Benelux 3; Canada 25; Denmark 3; Finland 1; France 10; Germany 10; Ireland 1; Italy 3; New Zealand 2; Norway 3; South Africa 3; Sweden 1; Switzerland 10; UK 20; and USA 10.

The distribution of the 20 appointed delegates is: Caribbean & South America 1; India 5; Malaysia 3; Mauritius 1; Middle East 2; Oceania 1; Rest of Africa 1; Rest of Asia 1; Rest of Europe 1; Singapore 2; and South Africa 2.

Working groups were established in countries with significant diaspora communities to organise elections.

== Results ==
=== Australia ===
Election is due to held on 22 May 2010 to elect four members in one constituency (NSW). Five members from three constituencies have already been elected unopposed:

==== Constituency 1 (New South Wales) ====
| Candidate | Votes | % |
|---|---|---|
| Sivasambu Brabaakaran | | |
| Dharshan Gunasingam | | |
| Ramalingam Karunanithy | | |
| Balasingham Prabhakaran | | |
| Sinnapu Victor Rajakulendran | | |
| Kulasegaram Sanchayan | | |
| Seran Sribalan | | |
| Total | | |

==== Constituency 2 (Victoria) ====
| Candidate | Votes | % | |
|---|---|---|---|
| Janani Balachandran | U/C* | | Elected |
| Dominic Savio Santhiapillai | U/C* | | Elected |
| Thuraisingam Shanmugananthakumar | U/C* | | Elected |

==== Constituency 4 (Australian Capital Territory, Tasmania) ====
| Candidate | Votes | % | |
|---|---|---|---|
| Apiramy Visuvanathan | U/C* | | Elected |

=== Canada ===
Election was held on 2 May 2010 in Canada to elect 25 members across five districts:

==== District 1 (Toronto GTA & Vicinities) ====
| Candidate | Votes | % | |
|---|---|---|---|
| Tharani Prapaharan | 4,967 | 15.50% | Elected |
| Thiru S. Thiruchelvam | 4,936 | 15.40% | Elected |
| M. K. Eelaventhan | 4,161 | 12.98% | Elected |
| Pon Balarajan | 3,777 | 11.79% | Elected |
| Joe Antony | 3,388 | 10.57% | Elected |
| Piraba Nalliah | 3,175 | 9.91% | |
| Deva Sabapathy | 2,754 | 8.59% | |
| Sri Bavan Sri-Skanda-Rajah | 2,691 | 8.40% | |
| Nimal Vinayagamoorthy | 2,197 | 6.86% | |
| Total | 32,046 | 100.00% | |
| Valid Votes | 7,004 | | |
| Rejected Votes | 2 | | |
| Total Polled | 7,006 | | |

==== District 2 (Eastern Ontario) ====
| Candidate | Votes | % | |
|---|---|---|---|
| Vanitha Rajendram | 8,451 | 15.07% | Elected |
| Esan Kulasekaram | 7,810 | 13.92% | Elected |
| Waran Vaithilingam | 6,523 | 11.63% | Elected |
| Mariampillai Anjalo Yogendran | 6,478 | 11.55% | Elected |
| Suresh Ratnabalan | 6,109 | 10.89% | Elected |
| Selvanayaki Sridas | 4,632 | 8.26% | |
| Vin Mahalingam | 3,845 | 6.85% | |
| R. Rajkumar Nada | 3,692 | 6.58% | |
| Jeyabalan Alagaratnam | 3,594 | 6.41% | |
| Srisangar (Shean) Sinnarajah | 2,541 | 4.53% | |
| Henry Kirupairajah | 2,420 | 4.31% | |
| Total | 56,095 | 100.00% | |
| Valid Votes | 12,021 | | |
| Rejected Votes | 5 | | |
| Total Polled | 12,026 | | |

==== District 3 (Western Ontario) ====
| Candidate | Votes | % | |
|---|---|---|---|
| Iyampillai (Shan) Shanmuganathan | 5,049 | 16.96% | Elected |
| Suren Mahendran | 5,002 | 16.80% | Elected |
| Sam Sangarasivam | 4,997 | 16.79% | Elected |
| Ram Sivalingam | 4,993 | 16.77% | Elected |
| Balan Ratnarajah | 4,844 | 16.27% | Elected |
| S. M. Thanapalan Marakandu | 2,501 | 8.40% | |
| Charles Devasagayam | 2,382 | 8.00% | |
| Total | 29,768 | 100.00% | |
| Valid Votes | 6,617 | | |
| Rejected Votes | 4 | | |
| Total Polled | 6,621 | | |

==== District 4 (Quebec & Eastern Canada) ====
| Candidate | Votes | % | |
|---|---|---|---|
| Luxan Sivapragasapillai | 3,221 | 14.14% | Elected |
| Maharajah (Nanthan) Nanthakumar | 2,818 | 12.37% | Elected |
| Niruthan Nagalingam | 2,794 | 12.27% | Elected |
| Kanthiah Theiventhiran | 2,690 | 11.81% | Elected |
| Majendran (Indran) Raveendran | 2,586 | 11.35% | |
| Bhuvan-Endra Nadarajah | 2,557 | 11.22% | Elected |
| Manoharan Majooran | 2,435 | 10.69% | |
| Muthuckumaru Sivananthan | 1,886 | 8.28% | |
| Roy Yarl Vaanan Wignarajah | 1,793 | 7.87% | |
| Total | 22,780 | 100.00% | |
| Valid Votes | | | |
| Rejected Votes | | | |
| Total Polled | 5,491 | | |

==== District 5 (Western Canada) ====
| Candidate | Votes | % | |
|---|---|---|---|
| Sivasothy Jeyamathy | U/C* | | Elected |
| Nagendra Katpana | U/C* | | Elected |
| Mokanasingham Markandu | U/C* | | Elected |
| Muthukumarasamy Ratna | U/C* | | Elected |
| Sothinathan Sumughan | U/C* | | Elected |

=== Denmark ===
Election was held on 2 May 2010 in Denmark to elect three members:

| Candidate | 1Sjæl land | 2 Syddan mark | 3 Midt & Nord Jylland | Total votes | % | |
|---|---|---|---|---|---|---|
| Remmon Washington | 375 | 963 | 1,400 | 2,738 | 32.63% | Elected |
| Sukenthini Nimalanathan | 370 | 943 | 1,313 | 2,626 | 31.30% | Elected |
| Maheswaran Ponnampalam | 338 | 916 | 1,296 | 2,550 | 30.39% | Elected |
| Elayaraj Kannan Sithamparanathan | 43 | 122 | 311 | 476 | 5.67% | |
| Total | 1,126 | 2,944 | 4,320 | 8,390 | 100.00% | |
| Valid Votes | 385 | 1,054 | 1,605 | 3,044 | | |
| Rejected Votes | 8 | 25 | 25 | 58 | | |
| Total Polled | 393 | 1,079 | 1,630 | 3,102 | | |
| Eligible Voters | | | | c6,500 | | |
| Turnout | | | | c48% | | |

=== France ===
Election was held on 2 May 2010 in France to elect 10 members across eight constituencies:

==== Constituency 1 (Electoral District 75) ====
| Candidate | Votes | % |
|---|---|---|
| Christian Gregory | | |
| Rajamalar Gunsegaralingam | | |
| Balachandran Sivaguuru | | |
| Mahintan Sivasubramaniam | | |

==== Constituency 2 (Electoral District 93) ====
| Candidate | Votes | % | |
|---|---|---|---|
| Rayappu Arulanantham | | | |
| Collins Mickeal | | | Elected |
| Ramesh Pathmanathan | | | |
| Kirushanthi Sakthithasan | | | Elected |

==== Constituency 3 (Electoral Districts 78 & 95) ====
| Candidate | Votes | % |
|---|---|---|
| Ariyaratnam Kanagasabai | | |
| Balasundaram Paramanathan | | |
| Sutharsan Sivagurunathan | | |

==== Constituency 4 (Electoral District 94) ====
| Candidate | Votes | % | |
|---|---|---|---|
| Balachandran Nagalingam | U/C* | | Elected |

==== Constituency 5 (Electoral District 92) ====
| Candidate | Votes | % | |
|---|---|---|---|
| Thiruchchoti Thirukulasingam | | | Elected |
| Balakanesan Thamotharampillay | | | |

==== Constituency 6 (Electoral Districts 77 & 91) ====
| Candidate | Votes | % | |
|---|---|---|---|
| Subashini Kuruparanathan | U/C* | | Elected |

==== Constituency 7 (Northern France) ====
| Candidate | Votes | % | |
|---|---|---|---|
| Sasikumar Saravanamuththu | U/C* | | Elected |

==== Constituency 8 (Southern France) ====
| Candidate | Votes | % | |
|---|---|---|---|
| Krishanth Tharmendran | U/C* | | Elected |

=== Germany ===
Election was held on 2 May 2010 in Germany to elect one member in one constituency: Election is due to held on 16 May 2010 to elect seven members in two constituencies.

==== Constituency 1 (Berlin, Brandenburg, Mecklenburg-Vorpommern, Sachsen-Anhalt, Sachsen, Thüringen) ====
| Candidate | Votes | % | |
|---|---|---|---|
| Vithiya Jeyasangar | 441 | 70.11% | Elected |
| Vazuki Thangarajah | 188 | 29.89% | |
| Valid Votes | 629 | 100.00% | |
| Rejected Votes | 1 | | |
| Total Polled | 630 | | |

==== Constituency 2 (Bremen, Hamburg, Niedersachsen, Schleswig-Holstein) ====
| Candidate | Votes | % | |
|---|---|---|---|
| Rajaratnam Jeyachandran | U/C* | | Elected |
| Renuga Logeswaran | U/C* | | Elected |

==== Constituency 3 (Nordrhein-Westfalen) ====
| Candidate | Votes | % |
|---|---|---|
| Gratian James Alston| | | |
| Mughunthan Indralingam | | |
| Subramaniam Paramananthan | | |
| Thaniga Subramaniam | | |
| Rasiah Thanabalasundaram | | |
| Nadarajah Thiruchelvam | | |
| Valid Votes | | |
| Rejected Votes | | |
| Total Polled | | |

==== Constituency 4 (Baden-Württemberg, Bayern, Hessen, Rheinland-Pfalz, Saarland) ====
| Candidate | Votes | % |
|---|---|---|
| Paramu Ananthasingam | | |
| Rajivan Arunasalam | | |
| Ananther Boopathy–Balavadivetkaran | | |
| Piriyatharsieni Manoharan | | |
| Nadarajah Rajendra | | |
| Selvaratnam Ratnaroopan | | |
| Valid Votes | | |
| Rejected Votes | | |
| Total Polled | | |

=== New Zealand ===
Two members across two electorates were elected unopposed:

==== Electorate 1 (Northern - Auckland) ====
| Candidate | Votes | % | |
|---|---|---|---|
| Theva Rajan | U/C* | | Elected |

==== Electorate 2 (Southern - Wellington) ====
| Candidate | Votes | % | |
|---|---|---|---|
| K. S. Naguleswaran | U/C* | | Elected |

=== Norway ===
Election was held on 2 May 2010 across 17 centres in Norway to elect three members on a nationwide constituency:

| Candidate | Votes | % | |
|---|---|---|---|
| Sivakanesan Thillaiampalam | 2,449 | | Elected |
| Jeyasri Balasubramaniam | 2,342 | | Elected |
| Murali Sivanandan | 2,321 | | Elected |
| Others | | | |
| Total | | | |
| Voters | 3,511 | | |
| Eligible Voters | c6,500 | | |
| Turnout | c54% | | |

=== Switzerland ===
Election was held on 2 May 2010 in Switzerland to elect 10 members across seven constituencies:

==== Constituency 1 (Bern, Solothurn) ====
| Candidate | Votes | % | |
|---|---|---|---|
| Suganya Puthirasigamani | 1,880 | 30.99% | Elected |
| Suntharalingam Virakathi | 1,846 | 30.43% | Elected |
| Thileepan Krishnasamy | 1,367 | 22.54% | |
| Suresh Selvaratnam | 973 | 16.04% | |
| Total | 6,066 | 100.00% | |

==== Constituency 2 (Zurich, Schaffhausen, Thurgau) ====
| Candidate | Votes | % | |
|---|---|---|---|
| Jeyam Selvarajah | 1,058 | 29.36% | Elected |
| Thayananth Alvaipillai | 854 | 23.70% | Elected |
| Sreetharan Ramanathan | 645 | 17.90% | |
| Ilango Visvalingam | 530 | 14.71% | |
| Devarajah Markandu | 517 | 14.35% | |
| Total | 3,604 | 100.00% | |

==== Constituency 3 (Basel, Aargau, Jura) ====
| Candidate | Votes | % | |
|---|---|---|---|
| Baskaralingam Mahalingam | U/C* | | Elected |

==== Constituency 4 (Luzern, Zug, Nidwalden, Uri, Obwalden, Schwyz) ====
| Candidate | Votes | % | |
|---|---|---|---|
| Balan Sivapatham | 515 | 44.90% | Elected |
| Kanapathipillai Uruthiran | 412 | 35.92% | |
| Balachandran Amuthaharan | 220 | 19.18% | |
| Total | 1,147 | 100.00% | |

==== Constituency 5 (Vaud, Valais, Genève, Fribourg, Neuchâtel) ====
| Candidate | Votes | % | |
|---|---|---|---|
| Sukinthan Murugaiah | U/C* | | Elected |
| Rajinithevi Sinnathamby | U/C* | | Elected |

==== Constituency 6 (Graubünden, Glarus, St. Gallen) ====
| Candidate | Votes | % | |
|---|---|---|---|
| Srisajeetha Sivarajah | 1,002 | 85.79% | Elected |
| Sountharajah Muthukumar | 166 | 14.21% | |
| Total | 1,168 | 100.00% | |

==== Constituency 7 (Tessin, Ticino) ====
| Candidate | Votes | % | |
|---|---|---|---|
| Mahenthirampillai Sellathurai | 111 | 50.92% | Elected |
| Deivendran Arulanandam | 107 | 49.08% | |
| Total | 218 | 100.00% | |

=== United Kingdom ===
Election was held on 2 May 2010 in the United Kingdom to elect 20 members across five constituencies:

==== Constituency 1 (North East London) ====
| Candidate | Votes | % | |
|---|---|---|---|
| Arththy Arumugam | 4,154 | 16.81% | Elected |
| Sasithar Maheswaran | 3,796 | 15.37% | Elected |
| Shanmuganathan Kaviraj | 3,758 | 15.21% | Elected |
| Selvarajah Sellathurai | 2,796 | 11.32% | Elected |
| Manivannan Pathmanabhan | 2,608 | 10.56% | |
| Vasuki Muruhathas | 2,006 | 8.12% | |
| Arumugam Kandiah Manoharan | 1,956 | 7.92% | |
| Senthinathan Suntherampillai | 990 | 4.01% | |
| Total | 24,705 | 100.00% | |

==== Constituency 2 (South East London) ====
| Candidate | Votes | % | |
|---|---|---|---|
| Nicholas Manoranjan | U/C* | | Elected |
| Janarthanan Pulenthiran | U/C* | | Elected |

==== Constituency 3 (South West London) ====
| Candidate | Votes | % |
|---|---|---|
| David Joseph | | |
| Paramasivan Karthikesan | | |
| Jeyashanker Murugiah | | |
| Namasivayam Sathiyamoorthy | | |
| Ruthirapathy Sekar | | |
| Vasuky Somaskanda | | |
| Vadivelu Surendran | | |
| Thanikasalam Thayaparan | | |
| Appathurai Vairavamoorthy | | |

==== Constituency 4 (North West London) ====
| Candidate | Votes | % | |
|---|---|---|---|
| Senathirajah Jeyanandamoorthy | 8,357 | 16.58% | Elected |
| Deluxon Morris | 6,334 | 12.57% | Elected |
| Balambigai Murugadas | 5,879 | 11.67% | Elected |
| Lalithasorubiny Pratheeparaj | 5,521 | 10.96% | Elected |
| Jeyavani Atchuthan | 5,446 | 10.81% | Elected |
| Sugirthakalas Gobiratnam | 4,959 | 9.84% | |
| Sugantha Mala Radhakrishnan | 3,988 | 7.91% | |
| Nimalan Seevaratnam | 3,678 | 7.30% | |
| Sockalingam Yogalingam | 2,739 | 5.44% | |
| Sivapoosam Sukumar | 1,753 | 3.48% | |
| Sivasambu Sivarajah | 1,741 | 3.45% | |
| Total | 50,395 | 100.00% | |

==== Constituency 5 (Outside London) ====
| Candidate | Votes | % |
|---|---|---|
| Vanniyasingam Gunaseelan | | |
| Reginald Kingston | | |
| Navaratnam Paramakumaran | | |
| Logeswaran Sivasubramaiyam | | |
| Sinnathurai Sriranjan | | |
| Arumugam Vivekanandarajah | | |

=== United States ===
Elections were held on 2 May 2010 in the United States to elect 10 members across nine regions, though eight regions were uncontested:

==== Region 1 (New England) ====
| Candidate | Votes | % | |
|---|---|---|---|
| Suba Suntharalingam | U/C* | | Elected |

==== Region 2 (New York) ====
| Candidate | Votes | % | |
|---|---|---|---|
| Jeyaprakash Jeyalingam | | | Elected |
| Sellathurai K. Dhayaparan | | | |
| Total | | | |

==== Region 3 (New Jersey) ====
| Candidate | Votes | % | |
|---|---|---|---|
| Shan Sundaram | U/C* | | Elected |

==== Region 4 (Mid Atlantic) ====
| Candidate | Votes | % | |
|---|---|---|---|
| Prabharan Ponnuthurai | U/C* | | Elected |

==== Region 5 (South) ====
| Candidate | Votes | % | |
|---|---|---|---|
| Ranjan Selva | U/C* | | Elected |

==== Region 6 (Mid West) ====
| Candidate | Votes | % | |
|---|---|---|---|
| Thave Thavendrarajah | U/C* | | Elected |

==== Region 7 (North West) ====
| Candidate | Votes | % | |
|---|---|---|---|
| Siva Sangary | U/C* | | Elected |

==== Region 8 (South West) ====
| Candidate | Votes | % | |
|---|---|---|---|
| Alex Doss | U/C* | | Elected |

==== Region 9 (National) ====
| Candidate | Votes | % | |
|---|---|---|---|
| Gerard Francis | U/C* | | Elected |
| Visvanathan Rudrakumaran | U/C* | | Elected |

== See also ==
- Tamil Eelam independence referendums, 2009-2010
- Vaddukoddai Resolution
