= 2009–2010 Tamil Eelam independence referendums =

2009–2010 unofficial referendum on the independence of Tamil Eelam from Sri Lanka

| May 10, 2009 – April 18, 2010 |
- I aspire for the formation of the independent and sovereign state of Tamil Eelam in the north and east territory of the island of Sri Lanka on the basis that the Tamils in the island of Sri Lanka make a distinct nation, have a traditional homeland and have the right to self-determination.

Results
| Choice | Votes | % |
|---|---|---|
| Yes | 207,058 | 99.68% |
| No | 656 | 0.32% |
| Valid votes | 207,714 | 99.65% |
| Invalid or blank votes | 721 | 0.35% |
| Total votes | 208,435 | 100.00% |

Territory claimed by Tamil Eelam

Between 10 May 2009 and 18 April 2010, a number of unofficial independence referendums were held amongst Sri Lankan Tamil diaspora communities on the independence of Tamil Eelam from Sri Lanka, as reported by Tamil nationalist online newspaper TamilNet.

Referendums were held in ten countries with significant Tamil diaspora populations: Norway, France, Canada, Switzerland, Germany, the Netherlands, the United Kingdom, Denmark, Italy, and Australia. The Government of Sri Lanka and its supporters allegedly attempted to prevent referendums from being held, according to TamilNet.

Although over 99% voted in favour of independence, the results of the referendums were not recognized by the Government of Sri Lanka.

== Procedure ==
The referendums, although organised by Tamil groups, were conducted by independent organisations with independent observers. Voters were asked their opinion on the following statement:

"I aspire for the formation of the independent and sovereign state of Tamil Eelam in the north and east territory of the island of Sri Lanka on the basis that the Tamils in the island of Sri Lanka make a distinct nation, have a traditional homeland and have the right to self-determination."

=== Norway ===
Voting took place on 10 May 2009 at 14 locations throughout Norway. The referendum was organised by the Utrop newspaper but conducted by independent Norwegian professionals. 99.11% voted for an independent Tamil Eelam.

=== France ===
Voting took place on 12 and 15 December 2009 at 35 locations throughout France. The referendum was organised by The House of Tamil Eelam but conducted by French election officers coming from local government councils. 99.86% voted for an independent Tamil Eelam.

=== Canada ===
Voting took place on 19 December 2009 at 31 locations throughout Canada. The referendum was organised by the Coalition for Tamil Elections Canada but conducted by Election Systems & Software. 99.82% voted for an independent Tamil Eelam. The low turnout was blamed on the need for all voters to register.

=== Switzerland ===
Voting took place on 23 and 24 January 2010 at 50 locations throughout Switzerland. The referendum was organised by a Swiss Tamil diaspora organisation but conducted by independent journalists and politicians. 99.80% voted for an independent Tamil Eelam.

=== Germany ===
Voting took place on 24 January 2010 at 110 locations throughout Germany. The referendum was organised by the International Human Rights Association of Bremen but conducted by independent teachers, NGO workers and politicians. 99.41% voted for an independent Tamil Eelam.

=== Netherlands ===
Voting took place on 24 January 2010 at 15 locations throughout the Netherlands. The referendum was organised by a Dutch Tamil diaspora organisation but conducted by independent election officials. 99.67% voted for an independent Tamil Eelam.

=== United Kingdom ===
Voting took place on 30 and 31 January 2010 at 65 locations throughout the UK. The referendum was organised by the Tamil National Council but officiated by independent observers, including councillors and Members of Parliament. 99.71% voted for an independent Tamil Eelam.

=== Denmark ===
Voting took place on 28 February 2010 at 33 locations throughout Denmark. The referendum was organised by the Denmark Tamils Forum but conducted by TNS Gallup. 99.49% voted for an independent Tamil Eelam.

=== Italy ===
Voting took place on 21 March 2010 at 16 locations throughout Italy. The referendum was organised by independent election commission of Eelham Tamils but conducted by the Co-ordination of Non-governmental Organisations for International Development Co-operation, an Italian federation of NGOs. 98.79% voted for an independent Tamil Eelam.

=== Australia ===
Voting took place on 17 and 18 April 2010 at 9 locations throughout Australia. The referendum was organised by the Tamil Referendum Council Australia but officiated by CPI Strategic, an independent body. 99.38% voted for an independent Tamil Eelam. Approximately 10,000 of the 15,000 eligible voters registered to vote.

== Results ==
| Country | Yes | | No | | Valid Votes | | Rejected Votes | Total Polled | Eligible Voters | Turnout (%) |
| Country | Votes | % | Votes | % | Votes | % | Rejected Votes | Total Polled | Eligible Voters | Turnout (%) |
|---|---|---|---|---|---|---|---|---|---|---|
| Norway | 5,574 | 99.11% | 50 | 0.89% | 5,624 | 100.00% | 9 | 5,633 | c8,500 | c66% |
| France | 30,936 | 99.86% | 43 | 0.14% | 30,979 | 100.00% | 169 | 31,148 | c35,000 | c89% |
| Canada | 48,481 | 99.82% | 85 | 0.18% | 48,566 | 100.00% | 17 | 48,583 | c100,000 | c49% |
| Switzerland | 16,357 | 99.80% | 32 | 0.20% | 16,389 | 100.00% | 52 | 16,441 | c25,000 | c66% |
| Germany | 22,904 | 99.41% | 136 | 0.59% | 23,040 | 100.00% | 49 | 23,089 | c25,000 | c92% |
| Netherlands | 2,728 | 99.67% | 9 | 0.33% | 2,737 | 100.00% | 13 | 2,750 | c4,000 | c69% |
| United Kingdom | 64,256 | 99.71% | 185 | 0.29% | 64,441 | 100.00% | 251 | 64,692 | c100,000 | c65% |
| Denmark | 4,072 | 99.49% | 21 | 0.51% | 4,093 | 100.00% | 54 | 4,147 | c6,500 | c64% |
| Italy | 3,596 | 98.79% | 44 | 1.21% | 3,640 | 100.00% | 40 | 3,680 | c4,500 | c82% |
| Australia | 8,154 | 99.38% | 51 | 0.62% | 8,205 | 100.00% | 67 | 8,272 | c15,000 | c55% |
| Total | 207,058 | 99.68% | 656 | 0.32% | 207,714 | 100.00% | 721 | 208,435 | c323,500 | c64% |

== See also ==
- 2010 Transnational Constituent Assembly of Tamil Eelam election
- Transnational Government of Tamil Eelam
- Vaddukoddai Resolution
