= Criminal charges levelled against the Liberation Tigers of Tamil Eelam =

There are allegations of various types of criminal activities levelled against the Liberation Tigers of Tamil Eelam (LTTE) by state actors and agencies.

One factor that has greatly benefited the LTTE has been its sophisticated international support network. While some of the funding obtained by the LTTE is from legitimate fundraising, a portion is obtained through criminal activities such as extortion among the Tamil diaspora, sea piracy, human trafficking, drug trafficking and gunrunning.

== Sea piracy ==
The LTTE has been accused of hijacking 4 Sri Lankan supply ships in the waters of Sri Lanka, including Irish Mona (in August 1995), Misen (in July 1997), Morong Bong (in July 1997) and Princess Kash (in August 1998). The MV Sik Yang, a 2,818-ton Malaysian-flag cargo ship which sailed from Tuticorin, India on 25 May 1999, went missing in waters near Sri Lanka. The fate of the ship's crew of 15 is unknown. A report published on June 30, 1999 states that the vessel "may have been" captured by the LTTE as it went missing in the waters of Sri Lanka, according to 'Anti-Shipping Activity Messages'.

Likewise, the crew of a Jordanian ship, MV Farah III in December 2006, that ran aground near LTTE-controlled territory off the island's coast, accused the Tamil Tigers of risking their lives and forcing them to abandon the vessel which was carrying 14,000 tons of Indian rice. Also they were accused of stripping off the equipment from it.

== Arms smuggling ==
The LTTE members operated a cargo company called "Otharad Cargo" in the United Arab Emirates. There are reports that the LTTE met Taliban members and discussed the "Sharjah network", which existed in the Sharjah emirate of the United Arab Emirates. The Sharjah network was used by Victor Bout, an arms-smuggling Russian intelligence agent, to provide the Taliban with weapons deliveries and other flights between Sharjah and Kandahar. Otharad Cargo reportedly received several consignments of military hardware from the Sharjah network.

The Mackenzie Institute claimed that LTTE's secretive international operations of the smuggling of weapons, explosives, and "dual use" technologies is attributed to the "KP Branch", headed by Selvarasa Pathmanathan prior to 2002. It also claims that the most expertly executed operation of the KP Branch was the theft of 32,400 rounds of 81 mm mortar ammunition purchased from Tanzania destined for the Sri Lanka Army. Being aware of the purchase of 35,000 mortar bombs, the LTTE made a bid to the manufacturer through a numbered company and arranged a vessel of their own to pick up the load. Once the bombs were loaded into the ship, the LTTE changed the name and registration of their ship. The vessel was taken to Tiger-held territory in Sri Lanka's north instead of transporting it to its intended destination. In 2002, Prabhakaran appointed Castro as the international chief of LTTE. He took over the responsibilities of arms smuggling and related activities from Pathmanathan.

== Extortion ==
The LTTE was known to extort money from Tamil civilians in Sri Lanka and the Sri Lankan Tamil diaspora by threatening the safety of their relatives or property in areas under its control.

== Money laundering ==
In 2008–2009, a report on "Money laundering and the financing of terrorism" to the European Union Committee stated a case study related to the LTTE which evidenced the implantation of this terrorist group in number of EU member states. In January 2011, Swiss authorities arrested several LTTE members on money laundering charges. The Swiss Federal Criminal Court has given no prison terms to alleged financiers of the LTTE. It said the 13 accused were either given suspended custodial sentences or acquitted. In December 2019, the Federal Supreme Court of Switzerland upheld the 2018 ruling, stating that the hierarchical link with the World Tamil Coordinating Committee "could not be sufficiently established" and that the LTTE is not a criminal group, "even if" it had committed acts of terror.

== Passport forgery ==
In the early 1990s, Canadian authorities uncovered a passport forgery scheme run by Canadian Tamils with links to the LTTE, including one of its founding members. In December 2010, Spanish and Thai police uncovered another passport forgery scheme attributed to LTTE. Rohan Gunaratna, a pro-government scholar and an international terrorism expert, alleged that LTTE supplied forged passports to Ramzi Yousef, who bombed the World Trade Center.

== Drug trafficking ==
A number of intelligence agencies have accused LTTE of involvement in drug trafficking. Citing Royal Canadian Mounted Police sources, Jane's Intelligence Review stated in 2007 "it is possible that LTTE-affiliated street gangs may be involved in lower-level distribution," and controlled a portion of the one-billion-dollar drug market in Montreal, Quebec. It also stated narcotics smuggling using its merchant ships is one of the main ways of earning money out of its $200-300 million annual income.

The U.S. Department of Justice stated in 2003 that "some Tamil Tiger communities" had historically served as the drug couriers moving narcotics into Europe. However, U.S. law enforcement officials were not able to confirm these suspicions. Available evidence did not suggest LTTE involvement in the European drug market. In 1987, British authorities denied allegations of LTTE involvement in drug trafficking. Indian authorities accused LTTE operatives of previously bringing narcotics to Mumbai from Mandsaur District of Madhya Pradesh, Rajasthan and the Punjab border. The drugs were then transported to coastal towns in Tamil Nadu such as Tuticorin, Rameswaram, Ramanathapuram, Nagapattinam and Kochi, in Kerala State. However, no verifiable evidence exists of LTTE involvement in the Asian drug market.

== Credit card fraud ==
Alleged LTTE operatives have been accused of involvement in credit card fraud. In 2008 the Special Task Force arrested Anandan, alias Neshanadan Muruganandan, accusing him of being “the mastermind behind the international credit card fraud for funding the LTTE.” In 2007, Norwegian authorities sentenced six individuals suspected to be LTTE agents for skimming more than 5.3 million Norwegian kroner in a credit card scam. Two of the accused gave contradictory testimony about the identity of their alleged LTTE handler and his whereabouts and due to insufficient information the police couldn’t take further action.

Maxwell Keegel, the first secretary of the Sri Lankan High Commission in London, accused Tamil employees at petrol stations in the UK of being LTTE operatives engaged in credit card fraud. However, the LTTE dismissed the accusations as attempts by the Sri Lankan government to divert attention from the human rights abuses by its armed forces. Detective Inspector Paul Welton of Humberside Police stated he would not go as far as to blame the LTTE. Tamil activists in the UK denounced Keegel’s allegations as being intended to criminalize their community as a whole.

== Cyberattacks ==
In August 1997, an organisation calling themselves the Internet Black Tigers claimed responsibility for the E-mail harassment of various Sri Lankan networks around the world. The group sent mass Emails which contained the text "We are the Internet Black Tigers and we're doing this to disrupt your communications". They were also responsible for repeated attacks on official sites of numerous other governments. (Note: According to Indrajit Banerjee, "This cyber attack in 1997 on Sri Lankan government and consulate network was the first recorded incident on internet terrorism by a conventional terrorist group". A Tamil tiger wing called ″Internet Black Tigers″ were involved in this attack and they were also responsible for repeated attacks on official sites of numerous other governments.) The LTTE is also accused of having pioneered online fund raising through solicitation and various cybercrimes including identity theft and credit card fraud.

LTTE is also known to use the internet for criminal profit. In an attack on Sheffield University's computer system, they were able to capture legitimate user IDs and passwords of well respected academics and to use them for propaganda and fundraising in a covert manner.

== See also ==
- Affiliates to the Liberation Tigers of Tamil Eelam
- Alleged war crimes during the final stages of the Sri Lankan Civil War
