= National Television of Tamil Eelam =

Defunct Sri Lankan television channel

National Television of Tamil Eelam (NTT) was a television channel affiliated to the Liberation Tigers of Tamil Eelam, a separatist militant organization which aimed to create the independent state of Tamil Eelam in northern Sri Lanka.

== History ==
The Tigers had previously operated a small television station in Jaffna in the mid-1980s, which did not last long. The studios were destroyed on 14 February 1987 by the Indian army.

NTT started broadcasting on 26 March 2005 from an undisclosed location within Tamil Eelam. It started with a daily 15-minute news bulletin, which was sent to the Tamil Television Network, an LTTE-affiliated television station based in Paris. Programming produced by NTT was still unavailable in Asia, as it relied on launching a channel via an accessible satellite. As a result, NTT became the first television channel owned by a rebel insurgent group. Satellite broadcasts to Asia started on 8 August, Effective 25 November, its daily airtime increased to 90 minutes, from 7:30pm Tamil Eelam Time for Asia and from 8:30pm to 10pm GMT for Europe on TTN.

In early April 2007, Intelsat removed NTT from its satellites covering Europe and Asia, citing unauthorized use on the grounds that the LTTE was a terrorist organization. Its associate channel TTN was shut down on 3 May 2007.

The channel reportedly shut down in 2009 due to the end of the Sri Lankan civil war.

== Logo ==
The logo of the channel was the Gloriosa superba, known among Tamils as the Karthigaipoo.
