= List of organizations designated as terrorist by Canada =

Organizations designated as terrorist by Canada are groups that have been listed by the Canadian government as terrorist organisations.

Since 18 December 2001, the Anti-terrorism Act has allowed for section 83.05 of the Canadian Criminal Code to be invoked by the Governor in Council to maintain a list of "entities" that are engaged in terrorism, facilitating it, or acting on behalf of such an entity.

Matters relevant to overall counterterrorism and national security within the Government of Canada fall under the jurisdiction of the Minister of Public Safety and Emergency Preparedness. A review is conducted by the minister every five years to determine whether an entity should remain listed. Entities may apply for a judicial review by the Chief Justice of the Federal Court. Both ministerial and judicial reviews are published in the Canada Gazette. The list is also published on the website of Public Safety Canada.

== List ==
=== Active ===
Currently listed entities, as of 7 December 2025
Entity	Date listed	Date reviewed
764	10 December 2025	N/A
Abdallah Azzam Brigades (AAB)	29 June 2015	7 June 2024
Abu Nidal Organization (ANO)	12 February 2003	7 June 2024
Abu Sayyaf Group (ASG)	12 February 2003	7 June 2024
Al-Aqsa Martyrs' Brigade (AAMB)	2 April 2003	7 June 2024
Al-Ashtar Brigades	21 June 2019	4 December 2025
Al-Murabitoun	2 June 2014	7 June 2024
Al-Muwaqi'un Bil Dima	7 November 2013	7 June 2024
Al Qaida	23 July 2002	4 December 2025
Al Qaida in the Arabian Peninsula (AQAP)	23 December 2010	7 June 2024
Al Qaida in the Indian Subcontinent (AQIS)	28 December 2016	7 June 2024
Al Qaida in the Islamic Maghreb (AQIM)	23 July 2002	7 June 2024
Al Shabaab	5 March 2010	7 June 2024
Al-Gama'a al-Islamiyya (AGAI)	23 July 2002	7 June 2024
Ansar al-Islam (AI)	17 May 2004	7 June 2024
Ansar Dine	3 February 2021	4 December 2025
Ansarallah	2 December 2024	N/A
Aryan Strikeforce	25 June 2021	N/A
Asbat Al-Ansar (AAA) (The League of Partisans)	27 November 2002	4 June 2021
Atomwaffen Division	3 February 2021	4 December 2025
Aum Shinrikyo (Aum)	10 December 2002	7 June 2024
Babbar Khalsa International (BKI)	18 June 2003	7 June 2024
Blood & Honour (B&H)	21 June 2019	7 June 2024
Boko Haram	24 December 2013	7 June 2024
Cártel de Jalisco Nueva Generación	20 February 2025	N/A
Cártel de Sinaloa	20 February 2025	N/A
Cártel del Golfo	20 February 2025	N/A
Cárteles Unidos	20 February 2025	N/A
Caucasus Emirate	24 December 2013	7 June 2024
Combat 18 (C18)	21 June 2019	7 June 2024
Ejército de Liberación Nacional (ELN)	2 April 2003	7 June 2024
Euskadi Ta Askatasuna (ETA)	2 April 2003	4 June 2021
Fatemiyoun Division	21 June 2019	4 December 2025
Front de Libération du Macina	3 February 2021	4 December 2025
Fuerzas Armadas Revolucionarias de Colombia (FARC)	2 April 2003	7 June 2024
Gulbuddin Hekmatyar	24 May 2005	7 June 2024
Gulbuddin Hekmatyar's Faction of the Hezb-e Islami, Hezb-e Islami Gulbuddin (HIG)	23 October 2006	7 June 2024
Hamas (Harakat Al-Muqawama Al-Islamiya) (Islamic Resistance Movement)	27 November 2002	4 June 2021
Haqqani Network	9 May 2013	7 June 2024
Harakat al-Sabireen (HaS)	21 June 2019	7 June 2024
Harakat ul-Mudjahidin (HuM)	27 November 2002	7 June 2024
HASAM (Harakat Sawa'd Misr)	11 February 2019	7 June 2024
Hizballah	10 December 2002	4 June 2021
Hizbul Mujahideen	3 February 2021	4 December 2025
Indian Mujahideen (IM)	28 December 2016	7 June 2024
International Relief Fund for the Afflicted and Needy - Canada (IRFAN – CANADA)	24 April 2014	7 June 2024
International Sikh Youth Federation (ISYF)	18 June 2003	7 June 2024
Islamic Movement of Uzbekistan (IMU)	2 April 2003	7 June 2024
Islamic Revolutionary Guard Corps	19 June 2024	N/A
Islamic Revolutionary Guard Corps' Qods Force (IRGC-QF)	17 December 2012	7 June 2024
Islamic State	20 August 2012	7 June 2024
Islamic State – Bangladesh	3 February 2021	4 December 2025
Islamic State – Democratic Republic of the Congo	25 June 2021	N/A
Islamic State East Asia	3 February 2021	4 December 2025
Islamic State in the Greater Sahara	3 February 2021	4 December 2025
Islamic State Khorasan Province (ISKP)	23 May 2018	4 December 2025
Islamic State in Libya	3 February 2021	4 December 2025
Islamic State – Sinai Province (ISSP)	7 April 2015	7 June 2024
Islamic State West Africa Province	3 February 2021	4 December 2025
Jaish-e-Mohammed (JeM)	27 November 2002	4 June 2021
Jama'at Nusrat Al-Islam Wal-Muslimin	3 February 2021	4 December 2025
James Mason	25 June 2021	N/A
Jaysh Al-Muhajirin Wal-Ansar (JMA)	30 October 2014	7 June 2024
Jemaah Islamiyyah (JI)	2 April 2003	7 June 2024
Kahane Chai (Kach)	24 May 2005	7 June 2024
Kurdistan Workers Party (PKK)	10 December 2002	7 June 2024
La Familia Michoacana	20 February 2025	N/A
La Mara Salvatrucha (MS-13)	20 February 2025	N/A
Lashkar-e-Jhangvi (LJ)	18 June 2003	7 June 2024
Lashkar-e-Tayyiba (LeT)	18 June 2003	7 June 2024
Liberation Tigers of Tamil Eelam (LTTE)	8 April 2006	7 June 2024
Movement for Oneness and Jihad in West Africa (MOJWA)	2 June 2014	7 June 2024
Palestine Liberation Front (PLF)	13 November 2003	7 June 2024
Palestinian Islamic Jihad (PIJ)	27 November 2002	4 June 2021
Popular Front for the Liberation of Palestine - General Command (PFLP-GC)	13 November 2003	4 June 2021
Popular Front for the Liberation of Palestine (PFLP)	13 November 2003	4 June 2021
Proud Boys	3 February 2021	4 December 2025
Russian Imperial Movement	3 February 2021	4 December 2025
Samidoun	15 October 2024	N/A
Sendero Luminoso (SL)	12 February 2003	7 June 2024
Taliban	9 May 2013	7 June 2024
Tehrik-e-Taliban Pakistan (TTP)	5 July 2011	7 June 2024
The Base	3 February 2021	4 December 2025
The Bishnoi Gang	29 September 2025	N/A
Three Percenters	25 June 2021	N/A
Tren de Aragua	20 February 2025	N/A
World Tamil Movement (WTM)	13 June 2008	7 June 2024

=== Former ===
1. Armed Islamic Group (GIA) (listed on 23 July 2002, removed on 18 June 2024)
2. People's Mujahedin of Iran (listed in 2005, removed in 2012)
3. Hay'at Tahrir al-Sham (removed in 2025)

== See also ==
- Terrorism in Canada
- List of designated terrorist groups
