= British Tamils =

British Tamils "பிரித்தானியத் தமிழர்"
Regions with significant populations
- London; Manchester; Birmingham; Nottingham; Bristol; Sheffield; Liverpool; Leicester; Leeds; Cardiff; Southampton

Languages
- British English · Tamil

Religion
- Hinduism; Christianity; Islam

Related ethnic groups
- Tamil people; British Asian; British Sri Lankans; British Indians

British Tamils (Tamil: பிரித்தானியத் தமிழர், [pirittāṉiyat tamiḻar]) are British people of Tamil origin (mainly from Sri Lanka, with a minority from Tamil Nadu) or descendants of Tamils who stayed in UK.

== History ==
Immigration of significant numbers of Tamils to the United Kingdom (UK) started with labour migrants in the 1940s. These were joined by students moving to the UK for education in the 1970s and by refugees fleeing the Sri Lankan Civil War in the 1980s and 1990s.

== Demographics ==
The UK has always had a strong, albeit small, population of Sri Lankan Tamils deriving from colonial era immigration between Sri Lanka and the UK, but a surge in emigration from Sri Lanka took place after 1983, as the civil war caused living conditions deteriorate and placed many inhabitants in danger of genocide.

"Tamil" is not one of the predefined tick-box answers for the ethnicity question on the UK Census. The tick-box options under the "Asian" category include "Indian", "Pakistani" and "Bangladeshi", but respondents can also tick an "Any other Asian" or simply "other" box and write in their own answer. In the 2011 Census, the number of respondents writing in "Tamil" was 24,930 in England, 128 in Wales, 99 in Scotland and 11 in Northern Ireland. In the 2021 census, 68,178 people wrote in "Tamil" in England, 803 in Wales and 24 in Northern Ireland. 123 people wrote in "Tamil" in Scotland's 2022 census.

The number of people in England and Wales that speak Tamil as their main language was recorded as 125,363 in the 2021 census. In Scotland's 2022 census, the number was 2,469.

In 2008, community estimates suggested that 150,000 Tamils lived in the UK, with a 2006 Human Rights Watch report putting the number of Sri Lankan Tamils in the UK at 110,000. A 2009 article in the FT Magazine put the number of Tamils at up to 200,000.

They are spread out throughout the country. The largest population of British Sri Lankan Tamils can be found in London, chiefly in Harrow (North West London), East Ham and across Redbridge (East London) and Tooting (South London), although Tamil population can be find across North, East and South London. The community generally has far lower birth rates in comparison to other South Asian ethnic groups, with one child for two parents being the norm.

== Socioeconomics ==
Unlike immigrants to countries in Continental Europe, the majority of Sri Lankan Tamils that went to live in Anglo-Saxon countries achieved entry through non-refugee methods such as educational visas and family reunion visas, owing to the highly educated in Sri Lanka being literate in English as well as Tamil. This resulted in the first generation diaspora falling into highly professional jobs such as medicine and law after studying at British educational facilities.

The result was that the community was perceived as being similar to the rest of the Indian community (see:Ugandan Indian Refugees) and therefore also gave them a more middle class image. The community, for the most part, did not suffer from the problems with criminality, anti-social behaviour, or poor socioeconomic demographics that have plagued other immigrant communities, although there are small Tamil criminal gangs present in London.

The Tamil Chamber of Commerce (TCC), for example, estimated in March 2011 that there are 5,000 Tamil-owned businesses in UK with a turnover of 1 billion GBP.

Percentage of children gaining 5 'A* to C' grades
Ethnicity	Difference from average (%) in 2011	Difference from average (%) in 2003
Chinese	+38%	+11%
Sri Lankan Tamil	+32.5%	+8%
Indian	+29.9%	+7%
Bangladeshi	+1.8%	-9.3%
Average	0	0
White British	-2.3%	+1%
Pakistani	-8.6%	-11.3%
Somali	-23.7%	-22.3%

== Politics ==
The Sri Lankan Civil War has played a crucial role in the political actions of the Eelam Tamil community. A number of activist organisations have been established by first generation immigrants in order to represent the voice of the Eelam Tamil community on the island, and several major protests have been held in order to forward various viewpoints surrounding the Eelam war, most notable of which was a mass demonstration in April 2009 which drew nearly 100,000 protestors.

The second generation have, however, generally been more emotionally detached from the politics of the civil war, giving more priority to the issues in the United Kingdom and European Union, and preferring to refrain from involving themselves into the more extreme activism surrounding the civil war.

== Culture ==
The second generation generally do not speak Tamil fluently enough to relate to South Asian culture and media, beyond news and politics, and therefore have traditionally avoided popular Indian culture like Kollywood (music and films) and literature. A number of scholars have suggested that this points to a relative success of integration by the community.

=== Social values ===
The community has some paternal aspects that clash with liberal western youth values. A number of second generation have commented on how their first generation parents tend to look down on many elements of western youth culture (binge drinking, illegal drugs, promiscuity, etc.), and issues such as mental illness, homophobia, and misogyny have often received minor vocal opposition from first generation Sri Lankans.

However, there are elements of Sri Lankan Tamil culture that are markedly more liberal than other South Asian communities. There is widespread tolerance towards the concept of love before marriage and the majority of Tamils are not subject to forced marriage (arranged marriages are always optional), and women are often encouraged to participate in the education and labour market prior to marriage.

=== Religion ===
Tamils are mostly Hindus, albeit a small Christian population along with Tamil-speaking Muslims also exist; much of Tamil traditional culture is rooted in Hinduism and Christian Tamils find it increasingly difficult to maintain a cultural identity that is separate and distinct from Hinduism. 'Raj' argued that there has been a 'Hindu resurgence' in the UK, whereby the young second generation living in the Hindu diaspora are reconstructing and realigning themselves with the faith of their parents, although religious adherence has largely declined over time in the United Kingdom as a whole.

Chakravoty discusses how British Sri Lankan Tamil youth often carried forward elements of Tamil culture from their parents into their own daily lives, such as the widespread practice of religious rituals.

== See also ==
- British Indian
- British Sri Lankans
- British Tamils Forum (BTF)
