= Ranjan Lala =

Captain Ranjan Lala
- கப்டன் லாலா ரஞ்சன்
- Born: K. Gnanendramohan; 2 September 1960
- Died: 13 July 1984 (aged 23); Thondamanaru, Jaffna District
- Years active: ?–1984
- Organization: Liberation Tigers of Tamil Eelam

Kanakanayakam Gnanendramohan (Tamil: கனகநாயகம் ஞானேந்திரமோகன் Kaṉakanāyakam Ñāṉēntiramōkaṉ; 2 September 1960 – 13 July 1984; commonly known by the nom de guerre Ranjan Lala) was a leading member of the Liberation Tigers of Tamil Eelam (LTTE), a separatist Tamil militant organisation in Sri Lanka.

Gnanendramohan was born on 2 September 1960. He was from Odakkarai near Point Pedro, Jaffna District. His niece Sivagowri Shanthamohan is married to Nediyavan (Perinpanayagam Sivaparan), a leading member of the LTTE amongst the Sri Lankan Tamil diaspora. Gnanendramohan joined the LTTE and took on the nom de guerre Ranjan Lala. He was one of the founding members of the LTTE and a confidant of its leader V. Prabhakaran.

He was trained in India along with Kumarappa and Bhanu. Captain Ranjan Lala was shot dead by the Special Task Force on 13 July 1984 whilst he was riding a motorcycle in the Thondamanaru area of Jaffna District.
