= Sixth Amendment to the Constitution of Sri Lanka =

Constitution of Sri Lanka

Sixth Amendment to the Constitution of Sri Lanka was enacted on 8 August 1983 and made it a criminal offence to advocate secession and establishing a separate state within Sri Lanka .It also made it mandatory for Sri Lankan members of Parliament and holders of official posts not to support a separate state within Sri Lankan borders and take an oath on this. This was done as Tamil United Liberation Front had called for a separate state called Tamil Eelam in the Vaddukoddai Resolution and the Black July riots had taken place which led to the Sri Lankan Civil War. This led to members of the Tamil United Liberation Front in the Sri Lankan parliament refusing to take the oath and forfeiting their seats. Tamil separatists led by the Liberation Tigers of Tamil Eelam took over leadership of the Tamils during the course of the Sri Lankan Civil War.
