= Global Tamil Forum =

Flag of the Tamil Democrats with the traditional colors of Tamil Eelam

Global Tamil Forum (GTF) is an International Tamil organization meant to further Tamil causes in Tamil areas of Sri Lanka. GTF supports self-determination for Tamils and wants justice for war crimes against Tamils. It is headed by S. J. Emmanuel. In UK it works with both Labour and Conservative Parties. It consists of Tamil organizations across the world.

== See also ==
- British Tamils Forum
- British Tamil Association
