= British Tamils Forum =

British Tamils Forum or BTF, is a largest organisation representing the Tamil Community in the United Kingdom. The BTF intends to be the voice of the Tamil Community in the UK by raising the issues on Tamils in UK and to bring awareness to the issues affecting Tamil people in the island of Sri Lanka and around the world. The BTF's work is focused on addressing the root cause to the conflict through an international justice mechanism to bring truth and justice to all victims of war and to bring end to the entrenched culture of impunity in Sri Lanka.

The BTF's vision for a lasting peace and security through a negotiated political settlement to the Tamil national question by recognising the Tamil people’s right in the North-East of the island of Sri Lanka and hope to bridge the voice between the British Tamil Community and the Tamil people in the island of Sri Lanka.

The Sri Lankan government banned the organization as a front for the LTTE. However the lack of evidence to link the BTF and with the LTTE and terror activities resulted in the ban eventually getting lifted in 2015 as a bid to achieve reconciliation. BTF was banned again in 2021 by the Sri Lankan government. The ban was again lifted in 2022.

== History ==
The British Tamils Forum was established as an advocacy group in 2006, with the support of Sri Lankan Tamils to undertake high level diplomacy, engaging with the members of parliament, government representatives, policy makers, civil society organisations and to mobilise the Tamil Community in the UK to on Sri Lankan Tamil issues. In 2010, BTF evolved as a nonpartisan, grassroots community organisation and representing a collective voice of the Tamil Community in the UK, by bringing together individuals, and Tamil organisations in a bottom-up structure, governed along the principles of participatory democracy.

== Activities ==
=== Boycott call ===
In January 2008, the Forum called for a boycott of SriLankan Airlines as well as other trade and travel sanctions, in protest at the Government of Sri Lanka's withdrawal from a ceasefire with the rebel Liberation Tigers of Tamil Eelam, after both sides had violated the agreement numerous times after LTTE instigation. Ivan Pedropillai of the forum stated that "£12m in foreign currency earned annually by the airline was being used to reinforce the government's war chest." The Forum organised a meeting chaired by MP Keith Vaz who compared the Tamil plight to the Rwandan genocide, Darfur killings and Bosnian ethnic cleansing. BTF spokesman Suren Surendiran surmised that the international community had continually pursued a double standard in its approach to conflict resolution in Sri Lanka compared to in states such as Zimbabwe, stating that the Sri Lankan government was "abusing the Tamils' fundamental human rights and killing innocent Tamil civilians with the aid and assistance from the international community."

=== 2008 photo exhibition in UK Parliament ===
On 16 July 2008, the BTF displayed a photo exhibition, sponsored by the All Party Parliamentary Group for Tamils (APPGT), which was held in the British Houses of Parliament premises on the anniversary of the Black July pogrom, and marked 50 years since the 1958 riots on the island. Photos depicted political figures according to BTF responsible for structural and physical violence in the North-East since Ceylon's independence from Britain as well as victims of the Sri Lankan civil war. The event was attended by MPs of all parties, Members of the House of Lords, Former Cabinet Ministers, Mayors, Councillors, University students, and representatives of international & UK organisations.

Attendees included three MPs of the Tamil National Alliance - Ms Padmini Sithamparanathan MP, Jayananthamoorthi MP and Gagendran MP, a representative of the Sri Lankan High Commissioner in London, Labour Party MPs Joan Ryan MP, Virendra Sharma MP, Keith Vaz MP, Andy Love MP and Lord Waddington QC of the Conservative Party. It was hailed by Neil Gerrard MP as "making a clear case for self-determination" and as a final note, Barry Gardiner MP wrote of the exhibition "We Build a Nation."

=== Ken Livingstone meeting ===
Whilst campaigning for a renewed term as London Mayor, Ken Livingstone MP sought the backing of the BTF in Harrow during a meeting. According to a column by Andrew Gilligan, Livingstone was accused by the Sri Lankan High Commission and Gilligan as speaking to "a front of the terror group LTTE." The BTF rejected the allegation. Gilligan has been noted by Livingstone to have led a sustained partisan campaign against the former mayor during his time in office. At the meeting, co-organised with councillor Thaya Iddaikadar and local Harrow Tamilians, Livingstone stated of the claim "the Metropolitan Police came under [me] and where there was a legitimate request for a legitimate event his office would always be supportive." Livingstone also gave the forum his "personal commitment" that he would support its candlelit vigil in Trafalgar Square in July 2008 to mark the 25th anniversary of "Black July."

=== Rallies ===
Annual political rallies are organised by the BTF and in June, July, September and October 2008, the forum organised and participated in several public demonstrations in London. It worked in union with the NSSP, the TYO (Tamil Youth Organisation), S4P (Solidarity for Peace), Socialist Resistance, the Socialist Party, International Socialist Group and South Asia Solidarity Group in condemning Mahinda Rajapakse's visit to London, and supported the right to self determination of the Tamil people in "Tamil Eelam." All Party debates in UK Parliament have highlighted gatherings organised by the BTF and the issues the forum has raised.

=== Statements ===
In the wake of a return to full-scale hostilities in 2008 on the island, with Tamil civilians moving further into rebel areas amid army offensives and increasing international concern on the plight of civilians caught in Sri Lanka's conflict, the BTF released a statement, responding to an assertion by Lord Malloch Brown that "the LTTE should allow free movement of civilians", accusing the Sri Lankan Government of deliberately "restricting free movement of civilians within and out of Jaffna Peninsula, where the Sinhala army is an occupying force." Its statement went on to note how "degrading restrictions laid on the Tamil community living in and around Colombo, restrictions placed on journalists to travel around Sri Lanka to report on current security situations and human rights violations and the inhuman treatment of IDPs by restricting their mobility, by placing them in 'detention centres' (e.g. in Mannar) [was] in contravention of humanitarian practices, human rights laws, U.N. Charters and Geneva Conventions." The forum has criticized British authorities for not condemning the Sri Lankan Government's human rights violations.

=== 2009 London Protest ===
On 31 January 2009, up to 100,000 people marched through London on a BTF co-organised demonstration, protesting the deaths of hundreds of Tamils in Sri Lankan army attacks and demanding a permanent ceasefire. Protesters carried large flags of red and yellow – the Tamil national colours – and banners condemning the genocide of Tamils by the Sri Lankan state, expressing their support for an independent Tamil Eelam. Passing peacefully for one of its size, with three MPs, Keith Vaz MP, Simon Hughes MP and Andrew Pelling MP joining the protest, Vaz stated that in his 21-year career in politics, he had never seen a protest as large as it in London. Addressing the crowd, he challenged the Indian High Commission to pressure Colombo to give peace a chance in the spirit of Mahatma Gandhi.

=== Land Grab Conference 2014 ===
A two-day international conference on the Sri Lankan state’s Land Grab of Tamil land, a number of speakers calling for an international mechanism to halt land-grabs. Various international delegates participated, including political and civil society representatives from the North and East of the Island of Sri Lanka, expressed serious concern about land garb issues.

31 January 2014 - Day one in the houses of Parliament committee room 14 1 February 2014 - Day two in the Kennedy Theatre, University College London

== Awards and recognition ==
The BTF received the "Asian Voice Award" for the "Best Campaigning organisation of the Year" in 2008. Introduced by Keith Vaz MP, forum representative Nathan Kumar received the award from John Reid MP at the event.

== See also ==
- British Tamil
- Federation of Tamil Sangams in North America
- Tamils Against Genocide
- Global Tamil Forum
- British Tamil Association
