= Tamils Rehabilitation Organisation =

Indian refugee organization

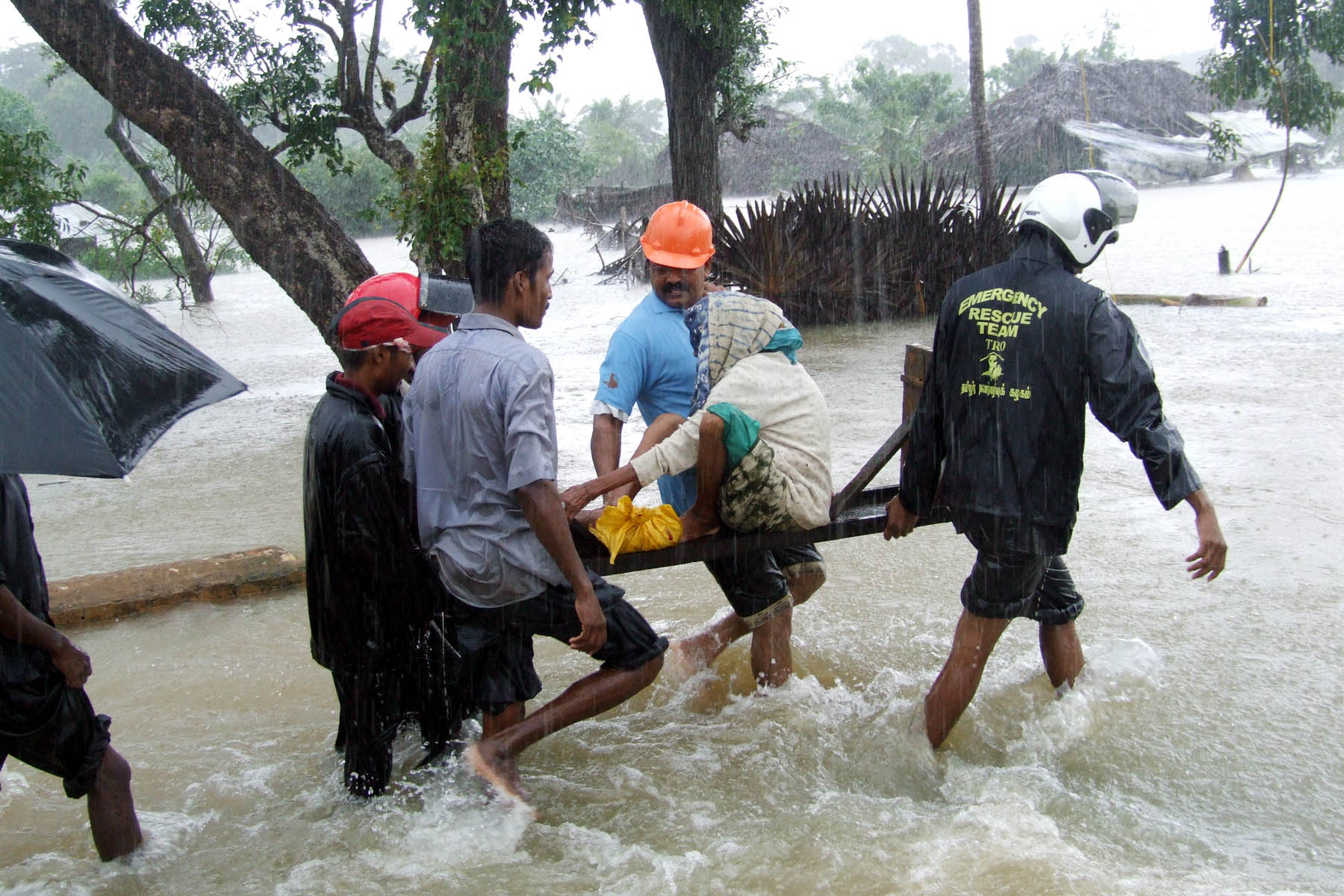
- TRO Emergency Rescue Team carries a woman to safety during floods
- Founded: 1985
- Region served: Sri Lanka

The Tamils Rehabilitation Organisation (TRO) was a fundraising front for the Liberation Tigers of Tamil Eelam (LTTE), originally established either by Tamil refugees or by the LTTE itself in 1985. Its nominal mission was initially to aid Tamil refugees from the Sri Lankan civil war who had fled to Tamil Nadu, and later to aid Tamils remaining in the Northern and Eastern Provinces of Sri Lanka, but a "significant amount" of its funds were redirected to support LTTE military operations.

After the signing of the Indo-Sri Lanka Accord and the subsequent fighting between the LTTE and the Indian Peace Keeping Force, TRO moved its operation and headquarters to Jaffna in Northern Sri Lanka. The headquarters moved again to Killinochchi after Jaffna was taken by Sri Lanka Armed Forces in 1995. After the signing of the ceasefire agreement in 2002 between the LTTE and the Government of Sri Lanka, TRO was recognised by the Government as a legitimate NGO and was granted NGO status. During the period 2002 to 2005 TRO operated from offices across Sri Lanka in both Government and LTTE controlled areas providing post war and post tsunami relief and rehabilitation to Tamil community.

The Financial Investigation Unit of the Criminal Investigation Department and the Central Bank Financial Investigation Unit which monitor the financial transactions noted the TRO is receiving millions from outside that is being sent to the LTTE in Wanni and LTTE International Procurement cadres to buy weapons, sophisticated communication equipment and other technology for the LTTE. The government quickly sealed off TRO offices in Sri Lanka and froze nearly Rs 72 million but the TRO managed to siphon off most of their funds prior to the freezing. The CID also sent the information through the INTERPOL.

On 15 November 2007, the United States Department of the Treasury designated the TRO as a SDGT in the SDN under Executive Order 13224, aimed to financially isolate US designated foreign terrorist groups and their support network. Under this order, the Department of the Treasury froze all assets held by the TRO and its designees in US territories, and formally prohibited US citizens from transacting with the TRO or its members.

The Department of Treasury stated that "T.R.O. passed off its operations as charitable, when in fact it was raising money for a designated terrorist group responsible for heinous acts of terrorism ... in the United States, T.R.O. has raised funds on behalf of the LTTE through a network of individual representatives. According to sources within the organization, T.R.O. is the preferred conduit of funds from the United States to the LTTE in Sri Lanka".

== See also ==
- British Tamil Association
- World Tamil Movement
- 2006 murder of TRO workers in Sri Lanka
