= 2006 murder of TRO workers in Sri Lanka =

Coordinates: 9.666°N 80°E

Murder of TRO workers
- Location: Welikanda, Sri Lanka
- Date: 2006 (+6 GMT)
- Target: Sri Lankan Tamil civilians
- Attack type: Unknown
- Weapon: Unknown
- Deaths: 7

2006 murder of TRO workers refers to the incident of abduction of seven Tamils Rehabilitation Organisation (TRO) employees who were tortured and executed by the TMVP paramilitary group. One employee Premini Thanuskodi was gang raped and murdered.

== Abduction ==
Seven TRO workers were abducted in two separate incident in January 2006 in Jaffna. The first incident happened when five workers were traveling from Batticalo to Kilinochchi. They were subjected to checks at the Sri Lanka Army checkpoint at Welikanda. At this point they noticed a white van behind them. After traveling a short distance from the checkpoint the workers were attacked by armed men in the white van. The assaulter then tied the workers and took them to a camp in the jungle. Three of the five abducted were released later. The next day another 15 workers were abducted 100 meters in front of the Walikanda checkpoint. 10 of the 15 abducted were released and were told to prepare the funeral rites for their colleges.

== Reaction ==
The President of Sri Lanka has asked the security forces to speed up the investigation concerning the abduction of the TRO workers. He further asked to search the Walikanda area for the abducted. The government also denied any links to this abduction.

Tamils Rehabilitation Organisation has alleged that their staff were abducted by the Karuna Group, a paramilitary organization which is believed to be working with the Sri Lankan Armed Forces. It further added that they have not received any reports or response from any investigating authorities.

The Amnesty International has asked for the immediate release of these workers

The former US Assistant Secretary of State for South and Central Asian Affairs, Christina Rocca, made an appeal for their release.

The LTTE expressed concern over the abduction of the TRO workers.

== Conflicting reports ==
UTHR reported that the LTTE had staged the abduction of the TRO workers but later said that they were not correct on this statement. However, TRO alleged that a government backed paramilitary was responsible for this abduction

== See also ==
- List of attacks on civilians attributed to Sri Lankan government forces
