= S. J. Emmanuel =

Sri Lankan Tamil Catholic priest and activist

Rev Fr Prof Dr S. J. Emmanuel
- Born: 1934 (age 91–92); Jaffna, Ceylon
- Education: University of Ceylon; Pontifical Urbaniana University

Reverend Father S. J. Emmanuel is a Sri Lankan Tamil Catholic priest, activist and president of the Global Tamil Forum, an umbrella organisation for Sri Lankan Tamil diaspora groups.

== Early life ==
Emmanuel was born in 1934 in Jaffna, Ceylon. He studied in Jaffna before going to the University of Ceylon in Colombo from where he obtained a bachelor's degree in physical sciences (Mathematics & Physics) in 1958. After graduation he spent time as a teacher and a journalist before he chose to join the priesthood. He then went to the Pontifical Urbaniana University in Rome from where he obtained a degree in philosophy and theology.

== Career ==
Emmanuel was ordained as a priest at St Peter's Basilica in December 1966. On returning to Ceylon he served as a pastor and diocesan director for lay apostolate. He returned to Rome in 1976 where he did research into lay ministries and obtained a doctorate in theology. After returning to Sri Lanka he served as a professor and Dean of Theology at the National Seminary in Kandy from 1976 to 1986, after which he was Rector of St. Francis Xavier’s Major Seminary in Jaffna for ten years. He was also the Vicar General of the Jaffna Diocese until 1997.

Emmanuel was amongst the half million people who fled the Jaffna Peninsula in October 1995 when the Sri Lankan Military launched an offensive to recapture the peninsula from the rebel Tamil Tigers. He spent the next year in the jungles of Vanni before going into exile in 1997.

== Exile ==
Emmanuel moved to Germany in 1997 where he was a priest in a catholic parish in the diocese of Münster until 2007. Since 2007 he has served as Vicarius Cooperator in St. Nikolaus Parish in Darfeld, Germany.

Emmanuel has spent his exile as a conscientious Catholic and Tamil activist publicising the impact of the Sri Lankan Civil War, mostly on Tamil civilians. In 2010 he was elected President of the Global Tamil Forum, an umbrella organisation for Sri Lankan Tamil diaspora groups.
