= Transnational Government of Tamil Eelam =

Sri Lankan Tamil disapora organisation

Transnational Government of Tamil Eelam நாடு கடந்த தமிழீழ அரசு
- The emblem of the transnational government
- Formation: 17 May 2010
- Purpose: The creation of an independent state called Tamil Eelam
- Official language: Tamil
- Prime minister: Visvanathan Rudrakumaran
- Main organ: Transnational Constituent Assembly of Tamil Eelam
- Website: Official website

The Transnational Government of Tamil Eelam (TGTE) is a transnational government-in-exile among the Sri Lankan Tamil diaspora which aims to establish Tamil Eelam, a secular and democratic socialist state which many Tamils aimed to create in the North-East of Sri Lanka. It was formed in 2010, following the defeat of the Liberation Tigers of Tamil Eelam (LTTE) and end of the Sri Lankan civil war in 2009.

== Background ==
Policies adopted by the majority Sinhalese government of Sri Lanka following independence from Britain in 1948 resulted in the growth of Sri Lankan Tamil nationalism, along with an appeal for Tamil autonomy. Political parties were formed to petition for these goals, with Tamil United Liberation Front (TULF), the main political party representing the Tamils, calling for "an independent sovereign, secular, socialist State of Tamil Eelam" based on the Vaddukoddai Resolution in its 1977 election manifesto. This was endorsed by the Tamil people who voted overwhelmingly for the TULF. However, the failure of the Tamil political parties to achieve autonomy resulted in some Tamils forming militant groups such as the Liberation Tigers of Tamil Eelam (LTTE). By 1983, full-scale civil war had broken out between the Tamil Tigers and the Sri Lankan government. Over the next three decades the Sri Lankan civil war became increasingly violent. The civil war came to an end on 18 May 2009 when the Sri Lankan military defeated the LTTE.

After the end of the war the UN urged the Sri Lankan government to address "the legitimate concerns and aspirations of the Tamil people". This was echoed by the EU, United States, India and other countries. In March 2010 the Tamil National Alliance (TNA), the successor to the TULF, dropped its demands for an independent Tamil Eelam but continues to demand greater autonomy through federalism.

== Structure ==
The TGTE was formed in 2010 following the end of the Sri Lankan civil war. It is based internationally, including in the United States, Canada, the United Kingdom, Australia, New Zealand, Norway, Germany, Italy, France and Switzerland. Its Prime Minister is Visvanathan Rudrakumaran, the former international legal advisor to the LTTE. Global elections took place among Sri Lankan Tamil diaspora communities in May 2010 to elect members to the first Transnational Constituent Assembly of Tamil Eelam.

The TGTE has maintained that it is a democratic organization, and intends to use soft power and not military power to its end. The TGTE constitution states "Whereas the TGTE has guided us towards a democratic system of government, to establish an independent state of Tamil Eelam based on the principles of peace, non-violence, tolerance, pluralism, transparency and accountability". The Sri Lankan government has banned the TGTE as a terrorist organization.

=== Advisory Committee ===
In June 2009 an Advisory Committee on the Formation of a Transnational Government of Tamil Eelam was established "to explore the modalities for the establishment of a Transnational Government of Tamil Eelam, and to recommend the objectives that should be achieved by such a Transnational Government".

The advisory committee consisted of many experts from different countries.

- Muthucumaraswamy Sornarajah, Ph.D./LL.D. (University of London, UK)
- Francis Boyle, Ph.D./J.D. (Harvard University, USA), Professor of International Law, USA
- Prof.Ramasamy Palanisamy, (Malaysia)
- Prof. A.J.C Chandrakanthan, (Canada)
- Nadarajah Sriskandarajah, Ph.D. (University of Sydney, Australia), Professor of Environmental Communication, Swedish University of Agricultural Sciences, Sweden
- Murugar Gunasingham, Ph.D.
- Dr.Sivanendran Seevanayagam (AUS)
- A.L. Vasanthakumar Ph.D. (UK)
- Karen Parker, Ph.D. Humanitarian Lawyer (USA)
- Nagalingam Jeyalingam, M.D. (USA)
- Selva Sivarajah
- Paul Williams
- Peter Schalk, Ph.D. Lund University (Religion) / University Gothenburg (Indology), Professor of History of Religion, Uppsala University, Sweden
- Dr. Anojan Selvanathan

The advisory committee published its final report in March 2010.

=== Transnational Constituent Assembly of Tamil Eelam ===
One of the main recommendations of the advisory committee was that a Transnational Constituent Assembly of Tamil Eelam be formed consisting of 135 members. Of these, 115 would be elected and the remaining 20 shall consist of delegates selected by the elected assembly to represent regions where elections aren't feasible.

The distribution of the 115 elected representatives is: Australia 10; Benelux 3; Canada 25; Denmark 3; Finland 1; France 10; Germany 10; Ireland 1; Italy 3; New Zealand 2; Norway 3; South Africa 3; Sweden 1; Switzerland 10; UK 20; and USA 10.

The distribution of the 20 appointed delegates is: Caribbean & South America 1; India 5; Malaysia 3; Mauritius 1; Middle East 2; Oceania 1; Rest of Africa 1; Rest of Asia 1; Rest of Europe 1; Singapore 2; and South Africa 2.

Working groups were established in countries with significant diaspora communities to organize elections. Elections were held in May 2010 and the following were elected:

- Australia - Janani Balachandran; Dominic Savio Santhiapillai; Eliyathamby Selvanathan; Thuraisingam Shanmugananthakumar;Kanagenthiram Manickavasagar and Apiramy Visuvanathan.
- Canada - Joe Antony; Pon Balarajan; M. K. Eelaventhan; Sivasothy Jeyamathy; Nagendra Katpana; Suren Mahendran; Mokanasingham Markandu; Bhuvan-Endra Nadarajah; Niruthan Nagalingam; Maharajah Nanthakumar; Tharani Prapaharan; Muthukumarasamy Ratna; Sam Sangarasivam; Iyampillai Shanmuganathan; Ram Sivalingam; Luxan Sivapragasapillai; Sothinathan Sumughan; Kanthiah Theiventhiran; Waran Vaithilingam.
- Denmark -
- France - Subashini Kuruparanathan; Balachandran Nagalingam; Sasikumar Saravanamuththu; and Krishanth Tharmendran.
- Germany - Rajaratnam Jeyachandran; Nadarajah Rajendrâ; Anather Poopathy Balavadivetkaren.
- New Zealand - K. S. Naguleswaran and Theva Rajan.
- Norway -
- Switzerland - Thayananth Alvaipillai; Baskaralingam Mahalingam; Suginthan Murugiah; Suganya Puthirasigamani; Mahenthirampillai Sellathurai; Jeyam Selvarajah; Rajinithevi Sinnathamby; Balan Sivapatham; Srisajeetha Sivarajah; and Suntharalingam Virakathi.
- United Kingdom - Arththy Arumugam;Shanmuganathan Kaviraj; Nicholas Manoranjan; Deluxon Morris; Balambihai Murugadas; Janarthanan Pulenthiran;Manivannan Pathmanabhan; Nimalan Seevaratnam; Sokalingam Yogalingam and Selvarajah Sellathurai.
- United States of America - Alex Doss; Gerard Francis; Jeyaprakash Jeyalingam; Prabharan Ponnuthurai; Visvanathan Rudrakumaran; Siva Sangary; Ranjan Selva; Shan Sundaram; Suba Suntharalingam; and Thave Thavendrarajah.

The inaugural assembly met between 17 May 2010 and 19 May 2010 at the National Constitution Center in Philadelphia, USA.
