= Nediyavan =

Sri Lankan Tamil rebel

- நெடியவன்
- Born: P. Sivaparan; 28 August 1976 (age 49); Vaddukoddai, Sri Lanka
- Other names: Nedi, November India
- Years active: 1994–
- Organization: Liberation Tigers of Tamil Eelam

Perinpanayagam Sivaparan (Tamil: பேரின்பநாயகம் சிவபரன், romanized: Pēriṉpanāyakam Civaparaṉ; born 28 August 1976; commonly known by the nom de guerre Nediyavan) is a Sri Lankan Tamil rebel and leading member of the Liberation Tigers of Tamil Eelam (LTTE), a separatist Tamil militant organisation in Sri Lanka.

== Early life and family ==
Sivaparan was born on 28 August 1976 in Vaddukoddai in northern Sri Lanka His family were from Sangarathai near Vaddukoddai. He was educated at Jaffna Hindu College.

Sivaparan married to Sivagowry Shanthamohan (Gowry), niece of Captain Ranjan Lala, on 30 October 2005.

== Career ==
Sivaparan joined the militant Liberation Tigers of Tamil Eelam (LTTE) in 1994 aged 18. Sivaparan, who was 6 feet tall, was given the nom de guerre "Nediyavan" (tall man). After initial training Nediyavan studied at Kittu's police college. He was sent by the LTTE to Russia to study political science but did not complete the course.

Nediyavan then joined the LTTE's political wing under S. P. Thamilselvan and took part in various Norwegian mediated peace talks with the Sri Lankan government. Nediyavan later worked at the LTTE's International Co-coordinating Centre (ICC) headed by Castro (Veerakulasingam Manivannan). He was entrusted with managing LTTE's finances and front organisations abroad.

Nediyavan was sent to Norway in 2006 to co-ordinate the LTTE's activities abroad. When war resumed between the LTTE and the Sri Lankan military in 2006 Castro appointed Nediyavan to be in charge of the LTTE's international branches. In early 2009, as the war escalated, Nediyavan's predecessor KP re-established control over the LTTE's international branches, a move resented by Castro. KP took over the leadership of the remnants of the LTTE after it was militarily defeated in May 2009 and its leader V. Prabhakaran killed. Castro, Nediyavan and their supporters opposed KP's leadership. Nediyavan is believed to have taken over the leadership of the LTTE following the arrest of KP in August 2009 though his wife Gowry as denied this. Former Sri Lankan diplomat K. Godage has alleged that KP's arrest was the result of betrayal by Nediyavan.

Nediyavan worked in a nursery school in Norway. He was head of the Tamil Coordinating Committee (TCC) in Norway. He was questioned by the Norwegian police in August 2009 for unspecified reasons.

Nediyavan was arrested by Norwegian police on 18 May 2011 in connection with financing LTTE activities in the Netherlands. After being interrogated for two days by a Dutch judge and five state attorneys he was later released on bail. The police warned Nediyavan not to engage in or promote violence whilst living on Norway. Nediyavan left Oslo and moved to a place 240 km away.

Nediyavan was amongst 424 individuals designated as terrorists by the Sri Lankan government in February 2014. In April 2014 the Sri Lankan police issued international arrest warrants (Interpol red notice) for 40 LTTE members including Nediyavan.
