= Visvanathan Rudrakumaran =

Sri Lankan politician

V. Rudrakumaran
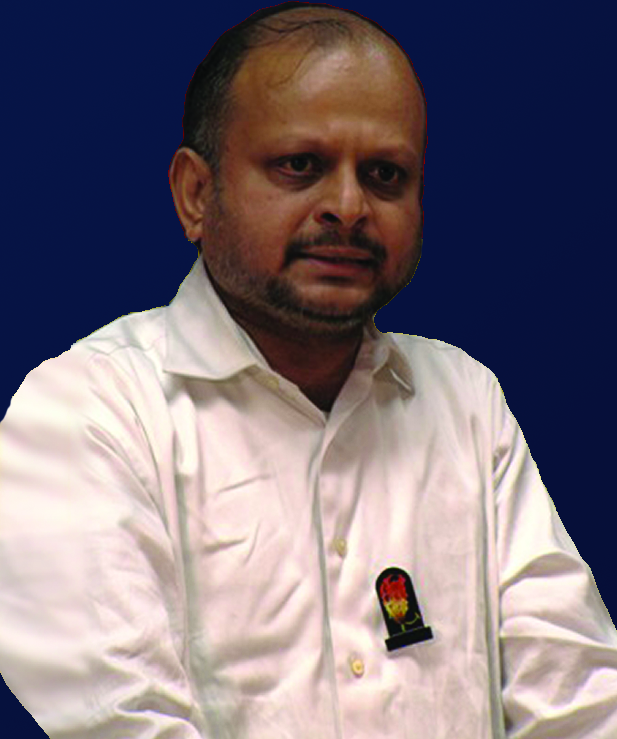
- Born: Sri Lanka
- Education: Sri Lanka Law College, Southern Methodist University, Harvard University
- Occupation: Lawyer
- Known for: Prime Minister of the Transnational Government of Tamil Eelam

Visuvanathan Rudrakumaran (Tamil: விசுவநாதன் உருத்ரகுமாரன்) is the prime minister of the Transnational Government of Tamil Eelam, which aims to realize accountability for crimes against humanity, war crimes and genocide committed by Sri Lanka against the Tamil minority and to create a separate Tamil state, called Tamil Eelam in Sri Lanka. He was the former legal advisor to the Liberation Tigers of Tamil Eelam (LTTE). By profession he is a lawyer in the United States. He is currently a US citizen and lives in New York City.

== Early life ==
Rudrakumaran is the son of the former Jaffna Mayor Rajah Viswanathan. He studied at Jaffna Central College and earned law degrees from the Sri Lanka Law College and the Southern Methodist University. He also studied law for a period at Harvard, and is an expert in immigration law.

== Career ==
=== Legal advisor to LTTE ===
Prior to the military defeat of the LTTE, he was the international legal advisor to the organization's supremo Velupillai Prabhakaran and in-charge of its international and diplomatic affairs. Rudrakumaran made valuable contributions to the LTTE, including coordinating lawyers in the defense of Rajiv Gandhi assassination case, assisting in Suresh Manikkavasagam trial in Canada and challenging US decision to name LTTE as a Foreign Terrorist Organization in 1997. He has represented the LTTE in several peace talks with the Government of Sri Lanka.

=== Prime Minister of Transnational Government of Tamil Eelam ===
Visuvanathan Rudrakumaran is currently heading the Transnational Government of Tamil Eelam as its prime minister. To date referendums have been held in seven countries (Norway, France, Canada, Switzerland, Germany, Netherlands and United Kingdom).

== See also ==
- Tamil Eelam independence referendums, 2009-2010
