= Utrop =

Norwegian newspaper

- Format: Online newspaper Biweekly print newspaper
- Editor: Majoran Vivekananthan
- Launched: October 2001 online June 2004 print
- Language: Norwegian
- Country: Norway
- Website: utrop.no

Utrop ('Outcry') is a Norwegian biweekly, multicultural newspaper.

It was established in 2001 as the first online newspaper for minorities in Norway. The newspaper was expanded to a paper version in June 2004. Editor-in-chief is Majoran Vivekananthan.
