= British Tamil Association =

British Tamil Association (BTA) is a Sri Lankan Tamil diaspora group in the United Kingdom. The VIGIL Network, in its October 2006 report LTTE "Tamil Tigers" and its UK-wide network, described the organization as "LTTE's de facto headquarters in London".

According to a 2006 Human Rights Watch report titled "Funding the Final War: LTTE Intimidation and Extortion in the Tamil Diaspora", the group acted as a front organization for the LTTE: a separatist militant organization, which waged a war against Sri Lankan state. The charitable group solicited funds to assist civilians affected by the war, but on most occasions, a significant amount of the funds raised were channeled to the LTTE for its military operations. And on a number of occasions, BTA had extorted money from Tamil people living in western countries by threatening the safety of their relatives back in Vanni, the northern part of Sri Lanka.

In June 2007, the founder of BTA, Krishanthakumar alias Shanthan was arrested by Metropolitan Police Service. In April 2009, he was found guilty of supplying bomb-making equipment for the LTTE and receiving documents for the purpose of terrorism. BTA is the successor to the United Tamil Organisation, which was proscribed in 2001.

== See also ==
- Tamils Rehabilitation Organisation
- World Tamil Movement
