= Tamil Television Network =

French Tamil-language satellite TV channel

TTN
- Country: France
- Broadcast area: Europe, Australasia, Middle East, North Africa

Programming
- Language: Tamil

History
- Launched: June 1997
- Closed: May 2007
- Former names: Tamil Radio & Television (TRT)

Tamil Television Network (TTN) was a France-based Tamil language satellite television channel. Its main audience were Sri Lankan Tamils living in Europe, Australia and the Middle East. The channel mainly broadcast films, live broadcast of football, crickets matches and news.

== Launch ==
In June 1997 Paris based Radio Asia (founded by Sabapathy Suppiah Kuhanathan, editor of Eelanadu) launched Tamil Radio & Television (TRT), the first Tamil-language TV station outside India. The subscription channel broadcast 24 hours to viewers across Europe, South Africa, Mauritius and Réunion. The channel broadcast news and original cultural programmes as well as films, soap operas and music imported from Tamil Nadu.

By 2000 it had about 7,000 subscribers and 50,000-60,000 viewers. Despite this the channel faced financial difficulties. In September 2000 Tamil Media Ltd, owner of IBC Radio, took a 50% stake in TRT, against the wishes of Kuhanathan. On January 14, 2001 TRT was renamed Tamil Television Network.

== Closure ==
The French authorities started investigating TTN after the Sri Lankan government protested about its links to the Tamil Tigers. The investigations revealed that TTN did not have a license to broadcast from the Conseil supérieur de l'audiovisuel (CSA), the French broadcasting regulator. Later TTN applied for a license but this was rejected by the CSA in February 2006 as TTN was already broadcasting from French soil without a license. The matter was referred to the Procureur de la République (Attorney General). The channel ceased broadcasting on 2 May 2007 when Globecast stopped relaying the channel.
