= Vaddukoddai Resolution =

Sri Lankan political event in 1976

The Vaddukoddai Resolution was adopted on May 14, 1976, in Pannakam, near Vaddukoddai, Northern Province, Sri Lanka. It called for the creation of an independent Tamil Eelam by the Tamil United Liberation Front under the leadership of S. J. V. Chelvanayakam. It was a major event in the modern history of Sri Lanka, as it was the first time the demand for a separate state for the Sri Lankan Tamils was made; Tamils had previously only demanded devolution or power sharing under a federal system. TULF contested the 1977 Sri Lankan parliamentary election on its demand for Tamil Eelam and won an overwhelming mandate in the Tamil areas, becoming the main opposition party in Sri Lanka, the only time a minority party has done so. It gave impetus to Tamil nationalists, who claimed it was a democratic endorsement of a separate state.

== Background ==
The adoption of the 1972 Sri Lankan Constitution made Sri Lanka a unitary state with Sinhala being the sole official language and Buddhism becoming the state religion. The Federal Party led by S. J. V. Chelvanayakam wanted a Federal state with Tamil being an official language. Prior to this point, ethnic tensions between the Sinhala and Tamil residents of the island had been growing due to events like the passage of the Ceylon Citizenship Act, which stripped all Indian Tamils of the island of their citizenship, the passage of the Sinhala Only Act which made Sinhala the only official language of the country, as well as two pogroms in 1956 and 1958. Earlier accords signed including Bandaranaike-Chelvanayakam Pact and the Dudley-Chelvanayakam pact aimed at compromises were not implemented by the Sri Lankan Government.

== Aftermath ==
The Tamil United Liberation Front demand for Tamil Eelam led the Sri Lankan Government to pass the 6th Amendment, which made it mandatory for all members of parliament to take an oath for the unitary state of Sri Lanka. The Tamil United Liberation Front resigned and refused to take the oath at a time when Tamil militancy was on the rise. Tamil Separatists led by the LTTE took over leadership of the Tamils during the course of the Sri Lankan Civil War.
