= World Tamil Movement =

- Flag of the World Tamil Movement
- Formation: 1986
- Type: Civil rights law
- Headquarters: Scarborough, Toronto, Canada
- President: Sitha Sithampalam

World Tamil Movement (abbreviated WTM) is a non-profit organization designated as a terrorist organization by Canada and Sri Lanka. The organization was created in 1986 and run by Canadians of ethnic Tamil heritage. Its president was Sitha Sithampalam until June 2008. The organisation has functioned as a community group that offers services such as translation, vocational training and a library for the Tamil population in Toronto, Ontario, Canada. It further organised cultural and sports leagues, and classes to help women and children integrate into the larger Canadian society. It was further involved in relief efforts for the 2004 Indian Ocean earthquake. It has also openly declared itself to share the politics of Sri Lankan Tamil nationalism, stating "It's no secret that the World Tamil Movement supports the right of the Tamil people to self-determination in the Northern and Eastern part of Sri Lanka. This is a political position – perhaps one that not everyone will agree with, but one that we are constitutionally entitled to hold."

== Investigation ==
Since 2006, The World Tamil Movement has been accused by the Royal Canadian Mounted Police (RCMP) and the Government of Canada as being a front organization of Liberation Tigers of Tamil Eelam (LTTE). The group's Quebec and Ontario branches are currently under police investigation for allegedly raising money for Sri Lanka's Liberation Tigers of Tamil Eelam rebels, which was proscribed in Canada as a terrorist group in 2006 by the Conservative Government of Canada. In April 2006, five days after the federal government labeled the Liberation Tigers of Tamil Eelam (LTTE) a terrorist organization, police raided offices of the World Tamil Movement in Toronto and Scarborough, sealing the buildings and confiscating boxes of documents. The government and media outlets such as The National Post and CTV deemed the move coming in line with the United States and Britain who had previously designated the organisation as a terrorist organization.

The Royal Canadian Mounted Police (RCMP) accuses the World Tamil Movement of collecting "war taxes" from Canada's large ethnic Tamil community and funnelling the cash to the Tamil Tigers guerrillas in Sri Lanka. During the raid on WTM offices in April 2006, RCMP officers claimed to have found "pledge forms, receipts, ledger books and lists of contributors." The RCMP claimed it had "obtained lists of Tamil Canadians and the amounts they had donated, as well as pre-authorized bank payment forms; – Lists of businesses that had made donations in multiples of $10,000; – Plastic collection jars with the WTM and Tamil Tigers logos side by side; – Computer disks that police said suggests money flows from Montreal to Toronto, then to other countries", with one RCMP Corporal describing what they stated they found as "significant evidence of terrorist financing."

Sergeant John MacDonald, the lead investigator and a member of the RCMP-led Integrated National Security Enforcement Team, claims that "The World Tamil Movement acts as the de facto taxation arm of the Liberation Tigers of Tamil Eelam and utilizes collectors to collect funds from Canadian Tamils on an organized and systematic basis." He further claimed he found "a manual on missile design, tributes to Tamil Tigers "martyrs," large numbers of documents pertaining to LTTE cadres, operatives and activities" and photos suggesting the WTM encourages Tamil Canadian children to "develop a cult-like devotion and obedience" to the leader of the Tamil Tigers."

In April 2008, Conservative MP Art Hanger tabled a petition in the House of Commons containing what he claimed were "the signatures of more than 1,000 Canadians of Sri Lankan origin." It urged the government to "ensure adequate surveillance and prosecution of the LTTE's front organizations and bogus charities."

== Designation ==
On June 16, 2008, the Government of Canada formally listed the World Tamil Movement as a "terrorist organization" under the Criminal Code. The World Tamil Movement, the Canadian Tamil Congress and the International Federation of Tamils condemned the move. Its vice president Velupillai Thangavelu refuted the state's allegations of extortion, arguing the RCMP had not prosecuted a single case. At the time of designation, no charges had been laid against the group or its members. Sithampalam characterised the listing as "the first step on a slippery slope, where all of our fundamental rights and freedoms can be eroded. We see the listing as a political move intended to silence a voice within the Tamil diaspora." Insisting that the organisation would fight the designation, their lawyer Marlyss Edwardh stated "This is not the conduct of a democracy where people are entitled to meet a challenge in a courtroom ... it's much more for them like the actions of a police state."

Sri Lanka designated the WTM as a terrorist organization in February 2014.
