= Lanka Education and Research Network =

- Abbreviation: LEARN
- Predecessor: Sri Lanka Inter-University Committee on Computing (SLIUCC)
- Formation: 1989
- Founder: Professor Abhaya Induruwa
- Founded at: University of Moratuwa
- Type: Governmental organization-Academic computer network organisation
- Legal status: company
- Purpose: Education and Research networking
- Headquarters: Information Technology Center, University of Peradeniya, Peradeniya 20400, Sri Lanka
- Members: 23 Education Institute; 6 Research Institutes
- Chairman: Senior Prof. Chandana Premakumara Udawatte
- Consultant: Prof. Roshan G. Ragel
- Affiliations: University Grants Commission
- Website: www.ac.lk
- Formerly called: Lanka Experimental Academic and Research Network

The Lanka Education and Research Network (LEARN), formerly the Lanka Experimental Academic and Research Network, is a specialized internet service provider dedicated to supporting the needs of the research and education communities within Sri Lanka. The history of the internet in Sri Lanka began with the initial proposal of the 'Lankan Experimental Academic and Research Network' (LEARN) to Sri Lankan government in 1989 by Prof. Abhaya Induruwa. In 1990 the LEARNmail was initiated and the first message was sent over LEARN was from the University of Moratuwa to the University of Colombo. In 1994, wireless links were used to create first Internet Protocol / Wide area network (IP/WAN) in Sri Lanka between University of Colombo, University of Moratuwa and Open University of Sri Lanka. Based on a proposal submitted in 1992 to Sri Lankan government, LEARN connected to the internet in 1995 opening doors to the Internet era in Sri Lanka.

Today LEARN as the National Research and Education Network in Sri Lanka, connects all of the UGC funded Sri Lankan national universities, a number of public universities, higher education institutes under other ministries, the University Grants Commission, the Ministry of Higher Education, and six national research institutions. It is a private company, owned by fourteen national universities including the UGC since 2009. According to University Grants Commission, its international connectivity include a 7Gbps bandwidth to the commodity internet and a 2.5Gbps link to LEARN point of presence in Singapore. It also connects the academic, world research internet through the TEIN4 network, SingAREN, NKN, LGN, Internet2 and Google. LEARN as the NREN forms the Sri Lankan component of the global advanced Research and Education Internet network.

== Current members ==
The full list of current members is shown below.

=== Sites Connected to the LEARN Network ===
- University Grants Commission (Sri Lanka)
- Ministry of Higher Education and Highways

=== Universities ===
- The Open University of Sri Lanka
- University of Colombo
- Eastern University
- University of Jaffna
- University of Kelaniya
- University of Moratuwa
- University of Peradeniya
- Rajarata University
- University of Ruhuna
- Sabaragamuwa University of Sri Lanka
- South Eastern University of Sri Lanka
- University of Sri Jayewardenepura
- Uva-Wellassa University
- University of the Visual and Performing Arts
- Wayamba University
- Bhiksu University of Sri Lanka
- Buddhist and Pali University of Sri Lanka
- Sri Palee Campus
- Gampaha Wickramarachchi University of Indigenous Medicine
- University of Vavuniya
- University of Vocational Technology

=== Research Institutes ===
- Arthur C. Clarke Institute for Modern Technologies
- Industrial Technology Institute (ITI)
- National Institute of Fundamental Studies (NIFS)
- National Aquatic Resources Agency (NARA)
- National Science Foundation (NSF)
- National Engineering Research and Development Center (NERDC)

=== Postgraduate Institutes ===
- Postgraduate Institute of Agriculture (PGIA)
- Postgraduate Institute of Medicine (PGIM)
- Postgraduate Institute of Humanities and Social Sciences (PGIHS)
- Vocational Training Institutes
- Sri Lanka – German Training Institute (SLGTI)
- Sri Lanka Institute of Advanced Technological Education (SLIATE)
- Informatics Institute of Technology

=== Members, but not having LEARN VPLS direct Connection ===
- National Centre for Advanced Studies in Humanities & Social Sciences
- Sri Lanka Law College
- National Institute of Social Development
- University College of Kuliyapitiya
- University College of Anuradhapura
- University College of Ratmalana
- University College of Jaffna
- Institute of Surveying and Mapping
- General Sir John Kotelawala Defence University
- Ocean University of Sri Lanka

== See also ==
- List of universities in Sri Lanka
- Education in Sri Lanka
- Sri Lankan universities
