= List of universities in Sri Lanka =

This is a list of higher education institutions in Sri Lanka. The Sri Lankan law on publicly financed universities, the University Grants Commission controls 17 Sri Lankan universities and other educational institutions, as higher education institutions.

== History ==
The origins of the modern university system in Sri Lanka dates back to 1921 when a University college, the Ceylon University College was established at the former premises of Royal College Colombo, and was affiliated with the University of London. The college provided courses of study in art and humanities, science and medicine prepared undergraduates for examination at the University of London. The beginnings of modern higher education in Ceylon commenced in 1870 with the establishment of the Ceylon Medical School, followed by Colombo Law College (1875), School of Agriculture (1884) and the Government Technical College (1893). In 1942 the first university was established in the country was the University of Ceylon which had several campuses island wide, Colombo (established 1942), Peradeniya (established 1949), Vidyodaya (established 1959), Vidyalankara (established 1959) and Katubedda (established 1972). Vidyodaya and Vidayalankara were established under the Vidyodaya and Vidayalankara University Act No 45 of 1958. The University of Ceylon was modelled on the Oxbridge formula, at its inception the university only accommodated 904 students, which later expanded to cover a number of universities and it remained as an elite-oriented university as stated by Sir Ivor Jennings, catering to a small number of students and exclusively residential. It was dissolved in 1972 to establish the University of Sri Lanka. In 1974 the Jaffna campus was added to the University of Sri Lanka.

The change of the government in July 1977 led to dismantling of the single university apparatus with the plan of establishing independent universities. With the promulgation of the Universities Act. No 16 of 1978, state university status was restored to the six separate campuses. The University Grants Commission (UGC) was also created to plan and coordinate the state university education. After that, a number of state universities were created. All these state universities are registered under the University Grants Commission, but a few come under the auspices of ministries other than the Ministry of Higher Education, in which the UGC is a part of. Most of the state universities depend on funds given by the University Grants Commission, as it is their primary and sometimes only source of funding. Therefore, the UGC has a direct control over these universities and administer the undergraduate intake. The UGC is subordinate to the Ministry of Higher Education.

== Legislation for universities ==
Universities in the Sri Lanka have generally been instituted by Special Presidential Decree, University Orders, Acts of Parliament and the Higher Education Act 1978.

=== Ordinance ===
- 20 of 1942 Ceylon University (Repealed in 1966)

=== Acts of Parliament ===
- Ceylon University (Amendment) Act No. 36 1956 (Repealed in 1966)
- Vidyodaya University and the Vidyalankara University Act, No. 45 of 1958 (Repealed in 1966)
- Higher Education Act No. 20 of 1966
- University of Ceylon Act No. 01 of 1972
- Universities Act No.16 of 1978 (this Act established the University Grant Commission and a University Service Appeals Board provided for the administration of universities with their campuses and outset the six campuses of the single University of Sri Lanka, the set up under the previous Act No.1 of 1972, were converted to six independent universities on 1 January 1979)

== Universities ==
There are currently seventeen universities in Sri Lanka, which are established under the authority of the University Grants Commission. All the following universities are recognised bodies with university status (University charter) under Universities Act No.16 of 1978.

University	Main campus			Founded (Note: Foundation date of earliest higher education establishment linked to current university.)	Type	Authority	University Status (University charter)
University	City	District	Province	Founded	Type	Authority	University Status (University charter)
University of Colombo	Colombo	Colombo	Western	1 June 1870	Public	UGC	1 July 1942
Eastern University	Vantharumoolai	Batticaloa	Eastern	1 August 1981	Public	UGC	26 September 1986
University of Jaffna	Jaffna	Jaffna	Northern	1 August 1974	Public	UGC	1 January 1979
University of Kelaniya	Kelaniya	Gampaha	Western	1875	Public	UGC	1959
University of Moratuwa	Moratuwa	Colombo	Western	1966	Public	UGC	1 January 1979
Open University	Nawala	Colombo	Western	1978	Public	UGC	1 January 1979
University of Peradeniya	Peradeniya	Kandy	Central	1 July 1942	Public	UGC	1 July 1942
Rajarata University	Mihintale	Anuradhapura	North Central	7 November 1995	Public	UGC	31 January 1996
University of Ruhuna	Matara	Matara	Southern	27 August 1978	Public	UGC	1 February 1984
Sabaragamuwa University	Belihuloya	Ratnapura	Sabaragamuwa	20 November 1991	Public	UGC	7 November 1995
South Eastern University	Oluvil	Ampara	Eastern	26 July 1995	Public	UGC	27 March 1996
University of Sri Jayewardenepura	Sri Jayawardenepura Kotte	Colombo	Western	1873	Public	UGC	1958
Uva Wellassa University	Badulla	Badulla	Uva	1 June 2005	Public	UGC	1 July 2005
University of the Visual and Performing Arts	Colombo	Colombo	Western	1893	Public	UGC	1 July 2005
Wayamba University	Kuliyapitiya	Kurunegala	North Western	January 1999	Public	UGC	17 August 1999
Gampaha Wickramarachchi University	Yakkala	Gampaha	Western	1928	Public	UGC	30 October 2020
University of Vavuniya	Vavuniya	Vavuniya	Northern	1991	Public	UGC	1 August 2021

== Dissolved universities ==
=== University of Ceylon ===
The University of Ceylon was the only university in Sri Lanka (earlier Ceylon) from 1942 until 1972. It had several constituent campuses at various locations around Sri Lanka. The University of Ceylon Act No. 1 of 1972, replaced it with the University of Sri Lanka which existed from 1973 to 1978.

=== University of Sri Lanka ===
The University of Sri Lanka was a public university in Sri Lanka. Established in 1972 by amalgamating the four existing universities, it was the only university in Sri Lanka from 1972 until 1978. The university was based at six campuses in Colombo, Peradeniya, Sri Jayewardenepura, Kelaniya, Moratuwa and Jaffna. The university was dissolved in 1978 and its six campuses became independent universities.

== Other government universities ==
Other Government Universities which are established by Acts of Parliament of Sri Lanka. These universities are not recognised bodies with university status or university charter under Universities Act No.16 of 1978.

University	Main campus			Founded (Note: Foundation date of earliest higher education establishment linked to current university.)	Type	Authority
University	City	District	Province	Founded	Type	Authority
Buddhasravaka Bhiksu University	Anuradhapura	Anuradhapura	North Central	1996	Public	Ministry of Higher Education
Buddhist and Pali University	Homagama	Colombo	Western	1982	Public	Ministry of Higher Education
General Sir John Kotelawala; Defence University	Ratmalana	Colombo	Western	11 October 2007	Public	Ministry of Defence
Ocean University of Sri Lanka	Mattakkuliya	Colombo	Western	2014	Public	Ministry of Skills Development and Vocational Training
University of Vocational Technology	Ratmalana	Colombo	Western	2014	Public	Ministry of Skills Development and Vocational Training

== Degree awarding institutes ==
Under the Section 25 A of the Universities Act No. 16 of 1978, following institutes have been recognised to award degrees.

Institute	Main campus			Founded	Recognised (Note: Date recognised as degree awarding body.)	Type
Institute	City	District	Province	Founded	Recognised	Type
Aquinas College of Higher Studies	Colombo	Colombo	Western	1953	10 October 2005	Private
Colombo International Nautical and Engineering College	Malabe	Colombo	Western	1990	9 July 2013	Private
Horizon Campus	Malabe	Colombo	Western	2008	26 November 2014	Private
Saegis Campus	Nugegoda	Colombo	Western	4 June 2010	11 July 2018	Private
Institute of Chartered Accountants of Sri Lanka	Colombo	Colombo	Western	1959	12 March 2013	Professional accountancy body
Institute of Surveying and Mapping	Diyatalawa	Badulla	Uva	1967	21 July 1990	Public
Institute of Technological Studies	Colombo	Colombo	Western	1984	18 January 2017	Private
KAATSU	Battaramulla	Colombo	Western	2015	7 January 2015	Private
National Institute of Business Management	Colombo	Colombo	Western	1968	20 October 2009	Private
National Institute of Social Development	Seeduwa	Colombo	Western		1992	Government
National School of Business Management	Colombo	Colombo	Western		5 March 2013	Private
SANASA Campus	Hettimulla	Kegalle	Sabaragamuwa		21 January 2014	Private
South Asian Institute of Technology and Medicine	Malabe	Colombo	Western	2008	30 August 2011	Private
Sri Lanka Institute of Development Administration	Colombo	Colombo	Western	1966	24 April 2003	Public
Sri Lanka Institute of Information Technology	Malabe	Colombo	Western	1999	13 October 2000	Private
Sri Lanka Institute of Nanotechnology	Homagama	Colombo	Western	2008	30 March 2004	Private
Sri Lanka International; Buddhist Academy	Pallekele	Kandy	Central	2009	22 February 2013	Private
Esoft Metro Campus	Colombo	Colombo	Western	2009	3 September 2019	Private
International College of Business and Technology	Colombo	Colombo	Western	2000	25 September 2020	Private
SLTC Research University	Padukka	Colombo	Western	2015	2 December 2016	Private
Business Management School	Colombo	Colombo	Western	2021	1 January 2021	Private
Royal Institute Colombo	Colombo	Colombo	Western	2021	1 January 2021	Private
International Institute of Health Science	Welisara	Colombo	Western	2021	11 June 2021	Private
Benedict XVI Catholic Institute of Higher Education	Negombo	Colombo	Western	2021	23 March 2021	Private
Institute of Chemistry Ceylon	Colombo	Colombo	Western	2020	11 March 2020	Private

== Rankings of universities ==
=== Webometrics rankings ===
2023 Webometrics Ranking of World Universities for Sri Lankan universities are listed below.

University	2023 (January edition)				2018 (July edition)				2016 (July edition)				2015 (July edition)			
University	Country university rank	Change in rank from previous year	World rank	Change from previous year	Country university rank	Change in rank from previous year	World rank	Change from previous year	Country university rank	Change in rank from previous year	World rank	Change from previous year	Country university rank	Change in rank from previous year	World rank	Change from previous year
Colombo	1	▲1	1485	▲679	2	▼1	2164	▼218	1	Steady	1946	▲93	1	Steady	2039	▲107
Peradeniya	2	▼1	1885	▲133	1	▲1	2018	▲140	2	Steady	2158	▲72	2	Steady	2230	▲249
Sri Jayewardenepura	3	▲3	1944	▲1127	6	Steady	3071	▼26	5	▼1	2476	▲615	4	▲2	3091	▲2878
Moratuwa	4	Steady	2219	▲502	4	▼1	2721	▼306	3	Steady	2415	▼8	3	Steady	2407	▲90
Ruhuna	5	▼2	2336	▲329	3	▲2	2665	▼31	5	▲1	2634	▲1891	6	Steady	4525	▼1042
Kelaniya	6	▼1	2971	▼219	5	▼1	2752	▼193	4	Steady	2559	▲570	4	▲1	3129	▲65
Rajarata	7	Steady	3020	▲1354	7	▲6	4374	▼370	13	▼3	6137	▲3570	10	Steady	9707	▼712
Jaffna	8	Steady	3633	▲751	8	▼1	4384	▼380	7	▲2	4004	▲2557	9	▼1	6561	▲664
Wayamba	9	▲5	4379	▲1030	14	▼4	5409	▼2731	10	▼3	5409	▼358	7	▲6	5051	▲6742
Sabaragamuwa	10	▲1	4590	▲560	11	Steady	5150	▲ -865	= 11	▲1	6015	▲4987	12	▼1	11002	▼203
Eastern	11	▼1	4621	▲90	10	▲2	4711	▲1304	= 11	▲2	6015	▲5250	13	▼1	11265	▼111
Open	12	▼3	5140	▼487	9	Steady	4653	▼174	9	▼1	4479	▲1091	8	▼1	5570	▲419
SLIIT	13	Steady	6657	▼1173	13	Steady	5484	Steady								
KDU	14	▼2	7267	▼1858	12	Steady	5409	Steady								
Uva Wellassa	15	▲1	7311	▲3140	16	▼3	10451	▲10451	15	Steady	11664	▲4050	15	▼1	15714	▼989
South Eastern	16	▼1	7709	▲1011	15	▼3	8720	▲752	14	▼3	7968	▲2061	11	▼2	10029	▼1705
Visual & Performing Arts	17	Steady	15491	▼669	17	▼9	14822	▼10701	8	▲6	4121	▲9944	14	▲1	14065	▲1626
Last Updated according to Webometrics Ranking of World Universities January 2023 Sri Lankan Edition

== See also ==
- Higher education in Sri Lanka
- List of research universities in Sri Lanka
- List of colleges and universities
- List of colleges and universities by country
