= Science and technology in Sri Lanka =

Scientific research in Sri Lanka is carried out by several research institutions. However, historically, Sri Lanka has been behind its regional peers in research funding. Sri Lanka was ranked 93rd in the Global Innovation Index in 2025.

== Funding ==
Sri Lanka's research funding is around 0.1% of GDP, which is among the lowest in the world. The apex body in Sri Lanka for government research funding is the National Science Foundation of Sri Lanka. The Accelerating Higher Education Expansion and Development (AHEAD), a joint program between the Sri Lankan government and the World Bank, provides research grants to Sri Lanka's higher education institutes.

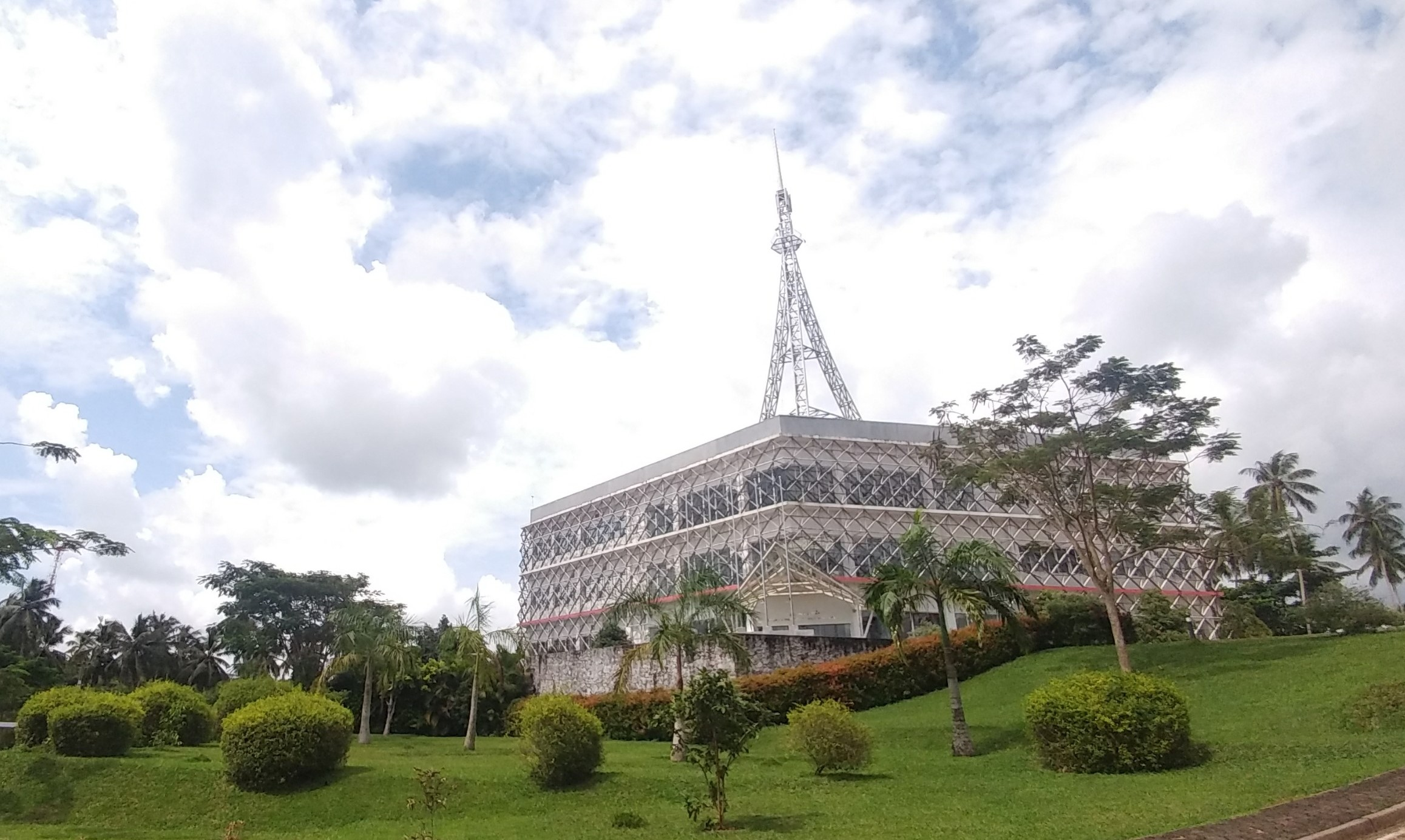
The Sri Lanka Institute of Nanotechnology in Homagama

== Institutions ==
- Arthur C. Clarke Institute for Modern Technologies is a major research institution and the national focal point for space technology applications in Sri Lanka.
- Gem and Jewelry Research and Training Institute (GJRTI)
- Rice Research and Development Institute (RRDI) - Department of Agriculture
- Medical Research Institute of Sri Lanka
- Institute for Research & Development
- National Aquatic Resources Research and Development Agency
- Lanka Education and Research Network
- Tea Research Institute of Sri Lanka (TRI)
- Rubber Research Institute of Sri Lanka
- Coconut Research Institute of Sri Lanka (CRI)
- National Science Foundation of Sri Lanka
- National Research Council of Sri Lanka (NRC)
- Center for Defence Research and Development (CDRD)
- Hector Kobbekaduwa Agrarian Research and Training Institute
- Ministry of Science Technology and Research
- Central Bank of Sri Lanka - Research Studies
- Sugarcane Research Institute - Sri Lanka
- Center for Women's Research (CENWOR)
- Veterinary Research Institute
- Institute of Policy Studies of Sri Lanka (IPS)
- Institute of Fundamental Studies
- Sri Lanka Institute of Nanotechnology
- Sri Lanka Institute of Biotechnology
- Institute of Applied Statistics, Sri Lanka
- IHP - Institute for Health Policy Homepage
- Ministry of Science Technology and Research
- Sri Lanka Council for Agricultural Research Policy (SLCARP)
- Bandaranaike Memorial Ayurvedic Research Institute
- Clothing Industry Training Institute (CITI) and Textile Training Services Center (TTSC)
- Natural Resources Management Center (NRMC)
- Center for Telecommunication Research (CTR)
- National Engineering Research and Development Center (NERD)

== Research universities ==
- University of Colombo (Western Province)
  - Sri Palee Campus
  - Institute of Indigenous Medicine
  - University of Colombo School of Computing
- University of Peradeniya (Central Province)
- University of Sri Jayewardenepura (Western Province)
- University of Kelaniya (Western Province)
  - Gampaha Wickramarachchi Ayurveda Institute
- University of Moratuwa (Western Province)
- University of Jaffna (Northern Province)
  - Ramanathan Academy of Fine Arts - Maruthanarmadam
  - Siddha Medicine Unit - Kaithady
  - Kilinochchi Campus
- University of Ruhuna (Southern Province)
- University of Vavuniya
- Open University of Sri Lanka
- Eastern University, Sri Lanka (Eastern Province)
  - Trincomalee Campus
  - Swami Vipulananda Institute of Aesthetic Studies (Eastern Province)
- South Eastern University of Sri Lanka, Oluvil (Eastern Province)
- Rajarata University (North Central Province)
- Sabaragamuwa University of Sri Lanka (Sabaragamuwa Province)
- Wayamba University of Sri Lanka, Kuliyapitiya and Makandura (North Western Province)
- Uva Wellassa University (Uva Province)
- University of the Visual & Performing Arts (Western Province)
- Sri Lanka Technological Campus (Western Province)
- Sri Lanka Institute of Information Technology (Western Province)
