= Sri Lanka Technology Campus =

Private university in Sri Lanka

SLTC
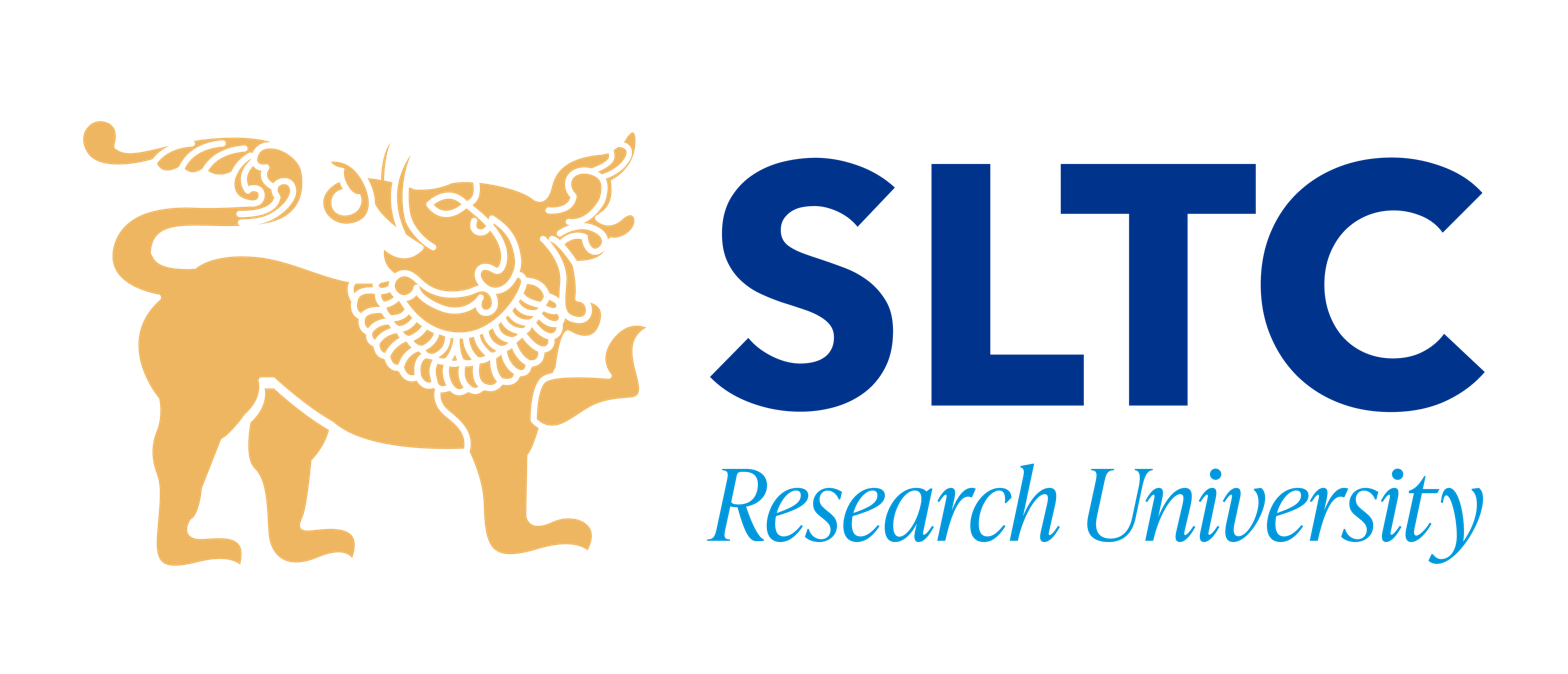
- Type: Private
- Established: 2015; 11 years ago
- Accreditation: Recognized by Ministry of Education, Higher Education and Vocational Education (Sri Lanka)
- Affiliations: Tempest Two Ltd
- Vice-Chancellor: Prof. Chandrika N Wijeyaratne
- Faculty: 300
- Total staff: 600
- Location: Padukka Colombo, Western Province, Sri Lanka
- Website: www.sltc.ac.lk

Sri Lanka Technology Campus is a private university in Sri Lanka. It conducts Engineering programs in Electronics, Telecommunications, Power Systems, Civil and Computing. Its degree programs are recognised by Recognized by Ministry of Education, Higher Education and Vocational Education.

== History ==
Founded in 2015, as a subsidiary of Sri Lanka Telecom, its residential campus is located at the 42 acre former Satellite Station premises in Padukka. SLT Campus's city campus is located at the TRACE Expert City in Colombo. It is the first corporate funded, fully residential private research university in Sri Lanka. Through Sri Lanka Telecom, it came under the Ministry of Telecommunication and Digital Infrastructure.

In 2017, it was recognized as a degree-awarding institution by the Ministry of Higher Education and Highways, with a gazette notification indicating it could grant BSc Engineering degrees in the fields of power, electronic, ICT, Civil and telecommunication engineering.

In 2021 SLT divested its ownership and sold the university to Tempest Two Ltd a joint venture between Capital Alliance and Insite Holdings.

== Faculty ==
- Faculty of Engineering
- Faculty of Technology
- Faculty of Science
- Faculty of Business Management
- Faculty of Computing & IT
- Department of Music
- Faculty of Postgraduate Studies & Research

== List of Departments ==
- Faculty of Engineering
  - Department of Civil Engineering
  - Department of Electrical Engineering
  - Department of Electronics and Telecommunications
  - Department of Industrial Management
  - Department of Mechatronics Engineering
- Faculty of Technology
  - Department of Agricultural Technology
  - Department of Applied Electronics
  - Department of Environmental Studies
- Faculty of Science
  - Department of Basic Science and Quantitative Studies
  - Department of Biosystems and Biotechnology
  - Department of Textile, Fashion and Clothing Technologies
- Faculty of Business Management
  - Department of Accounting and Finance
  - Department of Human Resource Management
  - Department of Logistics & Operations
  - Department of Marketing Management
  - Department of Travel and Tourism Management
- Faculty of Computing and IT
  - Department of Software Engineering
  - Department of Data Science
- Campus
  - Department of Music

== See also ==
- SLTMobitel
- List of universities in Sri Lanka
- Research in Sri Lanka
- Arthur C. Clarke Institute for Modern Technologies
