= Chaminda Jayasundara =

Chaminda Chiran Jayasundara obtained his bachelor's degree in Statistics from the University of Ruhuna, Sri Lanka in 2000, MSc in Information Management from the University of Sheffield, UK in 2002 and Doctor of Literature and Philosophy in Information Science from the University of South Africa in 2010. He has worked at the University of Colombo Library as the Deputy University Librarian, Fiji National University as the University Librarian, Sir John Kotelawala Defence University as the University Librarian and currently the University Librarian of the University of Kelaniya.

Dr. Jayasundara was a member of the steering committee formulated for the automation of Colombo Public Library in 2005. From 2007 to 2012, he worked as the Sri Lanka Country Coordinator of the International Network for the Availability of Scientific Publications (INASP) in UK and also Project Leader of the Sida/SAREC library support programme in Sri Lanka. He was appointed as a Consultant Librarian to the National Centre for Advancement of Humanities and Social Sciences of the University Grants Commission of Sri Lanka and he worked there till the end of 2011 as a consultant to the centre. He has been functioning as a researcher, research article reviewer for a number of peer-reviewed journals published in USA, South Africa, Venezuela, India and Sri Lanka. In 2006, he worked as a consultant to the Maldives Law Library, at the request of the Maldivian government, and he also acted as a visiting facilitator to the Master of Public Administration degree programme conducted by the Sri Lanka Institute of Development Administration in Sri Lanka which is a government owned venture for training of civil servants in the country. He served as a visiting lecturer in Information Management and Information Science for various faculties at the University of Colombo, and also the coordinator of its master's degree programme in Library and Information Science, Postgraduate Diploma in Information Systems Management and Masters in Information Systems Management.

He has introduced some undergraduate and postgraduate degree programmes at postgraduate level including but not limited to Postgraduate Diploma in Information Systems Management leading to Masters in Information Systems Management at the Faculty of Graduate Studies, University of Colombo, Diploma in Library and Information Management programme in 2004 at the National Institute of Library and Information Sciences. He was the in-charge of the curriculum planning and development committees of different academic programmes and he was mainly responsible for developing curriculum for Research methods for information work, Information Systems Project Management and Business Information modules. He was the pioneer for introducing Higher Education Certificate, higher Education Diploma and Bachelor of Library and Information Systems programmes at the Fiji National University in 2012.

He has also functioned as co-chairs of different international conferences including 6th International Conference on Academic Librarianship held from 14 to 15 July 2010, 7th International Conference on Contribution of the Academic Librarians towards a knowledge Society held from 16 to 17 August 2011, local organising committee co-chairship for the Third International Conference on Holistic Medicine, organized by University of Ballarat, Queensland University of Technology and University of Colombo in 2012. In 2018/2019, he was the President of the University Librarians Association of Sri Lanka (ULA). He organised the 10th International Research Conference of the University Librarians Association of Sri Lanka in 2019 at Mount Lavinia Hotel.

He also acted as a visiting lecturer cum an examiner of the MPhil and PhD programmes of the University of Colombo. He was the Country Coordinator of Fiji for the Electronic Information for Libraries (EIFL) based in Europe until 2017. He has authored few books and has provided research articles and write-ups for many scholarly publications. Currently he is the university librarian of the University of Kelaniya in Sri Lanka. He is a Certified Professional of the Australian Library and Information Association.
