= Adara Kanda =

Mountain in Sri Lanka

- Hagala Mountain
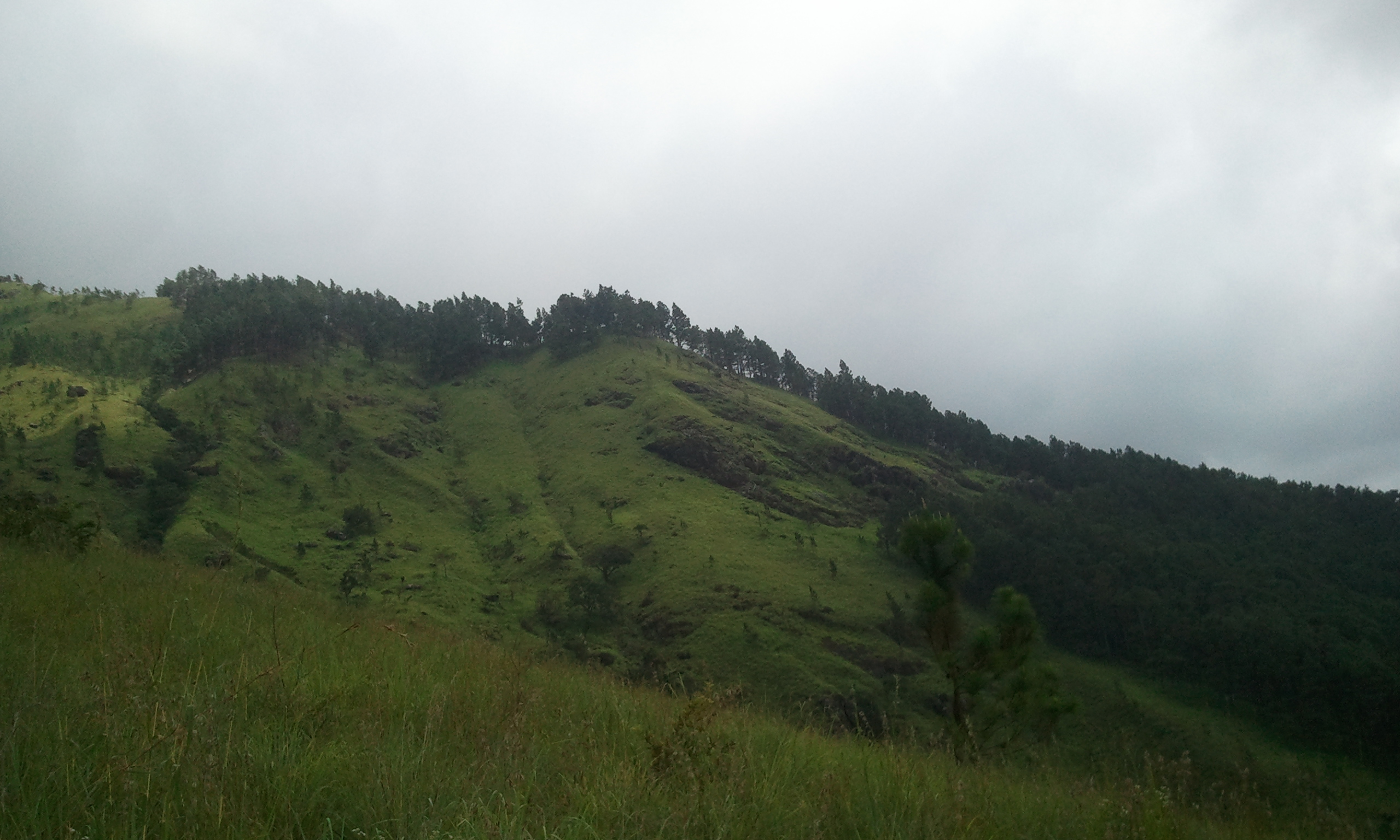
- View from the middle of mountain

Highest point
- Elevation: 1,500 m (4,900 ft)
- Coordinates: 06°45′03″N 80°46′26″E

Geography
- Location within Sri Lanka
- Location: Sri Lanka
- Parent range: Samanala

Climbing
- Easiest route: via Belihuloya

Adara Kanda, (Sinhala: ආදරවන්තයන්ගේ කන්ද) also known as Paraviyangala, and commonly known as Lovers' Peak, is a mountain in Sri Lanka. It falls within the Kalupahana mountain range. It is located approximately 5 km (3.1 mi) north east of Belihuloya in the Sabaragamuwa Province of Sri Lanka.

The mountain's peak is at an elevation of 1,500 m (4,900 ft).

Nearby are the Horton Plains and the Samanalawewa reservoir.

== See also ==
- Geography of Sri Lanka
- List of mountains in Sri Lanka
