= Higher education in Sri Lanka =

Higher education in Sri Lanka is an optional final stage of formal learning following secondary education. Higher education, also referred to as tertiary education occurs most commonly universities or degree-granting institutions. These may be public universities, public and private degree-granting institutions which award their own degrees or degrees from foreign universities. High visibility issues include limited capacity of public universities to cater for the demand and opposition to private universities from certain segments.

== Types of universities and institutions ==
=== Universities ===
There are only 17 state universities in Sri Lanka under the direct administration of the University Grants Commission which controls funding and appointments. The prominent ones are University of Colombo, University of Peradeniya, University of Kelaniya, University of Sri Jayawardhenapura, University of Moratuwa, University of Jaffna, University of Ruhuna As well as the state universities in Sri Lanka there are 107 private universities but only 24 private institutions are Recognized as Degree Awarding Institutes Under the Section 25A of Universities Act No. 16, 1978

=== Other government universities ===
Apart from the national universities controlled by the University Grants Commission, there are several other universities administrated directly by several government ministries.

=== Degree awarding institutions ===
In recent years, with amendments to the University Act, a few institutes and private companies have been given permission to grant their own degrees: The most prominent is the Sri Lanka Institute of Information Technology.

=== Professional institutions ===
There are many local and foreign professional bodies active in Sri Lanka such as Association of Chartered Certified Accountants, Chartered Institute of Management Accountants, British Computer Society, Association of Chartered Certified Accountants, etc. There are institutions provide entrance to professions such as the Sri Lanka Law College.

=== Vocational training ===
Vocational education and training in Sri Lanka are managed by the Tertiary and Vocational Education Commission of the Ministry of Vocational & Technical Training. Training includes course based curriculum at vocational technical training centers and apprenticeship at private or public organizations. Higher education in vocational fields could be archived though several universities. The National Vocational Qualifications Systems in Sri Lanka (NVQSL) provides a structured seven levels of qualifications from Level 1 to Level 7. Vocational education and training is carried out for degree level at the Open University, Sri Lanka and the University of Vocational Technology, as well as at diploma level at 37 technical colleges, Institute of Engineering Technology, Sri Lanka Institute of Advanced Technological Education and the Sri Lanka School of Agriculture.

== History ==
The beginnings of modern higher education in Ceylon commenced in 1870 with the establishment of the Ceylon Medical School, followed by Colombo Law College (1875), School of Agriculture (1884) and the Government Technical College (1893).

The origins of the modern university system in Sri Lanka dates back to 1921 when a University college, the Ceylon University College was established at the former premises of Royal College Colombo, and was affiliated with the University of London. The college provided courses of study in art and humanities, science and medicine prepared undergraduates for examination at the University of London.

In 1942 the first university was established in the country was the University of Ceylon which had several campuses island wide, Colombo (established 1942), Peradeniya (established 1949), Vidyodaya (established 1959), Vidyalankara (established 1959) and Katubedda (established 1972). Vidyodaya and Vidayalankara were established under the Vidyodaya and Vidayalankara University Act No 45 of 1958. The University of Ceylon was modelled on the Oxbridge formula, at its inception the university only accommodated 904 students, which later expanded to cover a number of universities and it remained as an elite-oriented university as stated by Sir Ivor Jennings, catering to a small number of students and exclusively residential. It was dissolved in 1972 to establish the University of Sri Lanka. In 1974 the Jaffna campus was added to the University of Sri Lanka.

The change of the government in July 1977 led to dismantling of the single university apparatus with the plan of establishing independent universities. With the promulgation of the Universities Act. No 16 of 1978, state university status was restored to the six separate campuses. The University Grants Commission (UGC) was also created to plan and coordinate the state university education. After that, a number of state universities were created. All these state universities are registered under the University Grants Commission, but a few come under the auspices of ministries other than the Ministry of Higher Education, in which the UGC is a part of. Most of the state universities depend on funds given by the University Grants Commission, as it is their primary and sometimes only source of funding. Therefore, the UGC has a direct control over these universities and administer the undergraduate intake. The UGC is subordinate to the Ministry of Higher Education.

== Legislation ==
Universities in the Sri Lanka have generally been instituted by Special Presidential Decree, University Orders, Acts of Parliament and the Higher Education Act 1978.

=== Ordinance ===
- Ceylon University Ordinance No.20 of 1942

=== Acts of Parliament ===
- Ceylon University (Amendment) Act No.36 1956
- Vidyodaya University and Vidyakara University Act No.45 of 1958
- Higher Education Act No.20 of 1960
- University of Ceylon Act No.01 of 1972
- Universities Act No.16 of 1978 (this Act established the University Grant Commission and a University Service Appeals Board provided for the administration of universities with their campuses and outset the six campuses of the single University of Sri Lanka, the set up under the previous Act No.1 of 1972, were converted to six independent universities on 1 January 1979)

== Admission process ==
Undergraduate education in state universities is free but entrance is extremely competitive, limited and standardized. Fewer than 16% (less than 16,000 students) of those who qualify get admission to state universities and of that only half graduate. Admission to the university system is based on the highly competitive GCE Advanced Level examination. Selection of students is done on the basis of rank order on average Z Scores obtained by candidates at the GCE Advanced Level to replicate a district basis representation. Only the top students from each district get admissions, as appose to their overall island rank.

== Funding ==
All state universities are funded through the government and undergraduate education is free in these universities. All postgraduate education is fee-levied, unless sponsored by the government. Government also provides grants for students through the Mahapola Higher Education Scholarship Trust Fund.

== Criticism ==
=== Z score ===
Due to the limited intake into state universities, admissions are based on the student's rank order on average Z Scores obtained by candidates at the GCE Advanced Level to replicate a district basis representation. The top students from urban and rural districts get the chances of having tertiary education. However, top students who got qualified under the minimum Z Scores requirements for admissions from remote districts may get in with relatively lower marks than those from urban districts. As a result, many students who are not granted admission find other means of higher education.

=== Graduate unemployment ===
Sri Lanka has a large number of unemployed graduates numbering 43,000 in 2017. Low economic growth, limited vacancies in public sector as well as unemployable skill set of graduates who have studied aesthetics subjects, while there is a major shortage of technical knowledge. Calls for reform of the university system has been called for to address these issues and the successive attempt to grant government jobs to these graduates mainly in teaching.

=== Ragging ===
ragging has been widespread in Sri Lankan universities. Certain student groups such as the IUSF uses ragging as a means of attracting a following among more backward students. Student groups claim that ragging served as a social equalizer in the universities. But with the emergence of JVP-backed student unions such as IUSF, ragging has served primarily to ensure the continuing domination of JVP political power within the universities, academics suggest with several student death associated to it.

=== Academic standards ===
The academic standards of Sri Lankan universities have been questioned as they fare extremely low in international rankings with the University of the Colombo ranked 801 in the Times Higher Education World University Rankings and 8 in South Asia.
