= Sri Lanka University Games =

MULTI SPORTING EVENT

- Purpose: Multi-sport event for universities of Sri Lanka
- Frequency: Every three years
- Inaugurated: 1980 Sri Lanka University Games in Peradeniya
- Most recent: 2019 Sri Lanka University Games in Matara

The Sri Lanka University Games (SLUG) are a multi-sporting event held between public universities in Sri Lanka.

== History ==
Inter-University sports championships have been organized since the latter part of the 1950s. The first University Sports Festival was held in 1980 at the University of Peradeniya in response to a suggestion made by the Director of Physical Education of the University of Peradeniya, Mr. Lesley Handunge. Mr. Lesley Handunge, a graduate of the University of Peradeniya himself, was a skilled sportsman who had represented Sri Lanka twice in boxing at the Olympic Games. Furthermore, as he had led the Sri Lankan team at the World University Sports Festival and at a number of other international sports festivals. Mr. Handunge was able to organize a festival among universities in keeping with the standards and traditions of the Olympic Games. Thus, following this tradition, the Sri Lankan universities organize a festival once in three years and the Wayamba University of Sri Lanka organized XII Sri Lanka University Games in 2016.

The first Sri Lanka University Sports Festival which was organized by the University of Peradeniya was held in 1980.

== Participant Universities ==
The first Sri Lanka University Games saw the participation of six public universities and by 2023 the participation has risen to 15 universities

PER	University of Peradeniya
COL	University of Colombo
KEL	University of Kelaniya
SJP	University of Sri Jayewardenepura
MOR	University of Moratuwa
RUH	University of Ruhuna
JAF	University of Jaffna
EST	Eastern University of Sri Lanka
RAJ	Rajarata University of Sri Lanka
SAB	Sabaragamuwa University of Sri Lanka
WAY	Wayamba University of Sri Lanka
SEA	South Eastern University of Sri Lanka
VPA	University of the Visual & Performing Arts
UVA	Uva Wellassa University
GWUIM	Gampaha Wickramarachchi University of Indigenous Medicine

== Events ==
The first Sri Lanka University Games included 12 events and by 2013 it has risen to 36 events under 22 sport categories.

Men	Women
Badminton	Badminton
Baseball	-
Basketball	Basketball
Carrom	Carrom
Chess	Chess
Cricket	-
Elle	Elle
Football	-
Hockey	Hockey
Karate	Karate
-	Netball
Road Race	-
Rowing	Rowing
Rugby	-
Swimming	Swimming
Table Tennis	Table Tennis
Taekwondo	Taekwondo
Tennis	Tennis
Track and Field	Track and Field
Volleyball	Volleyball
Weightlifting	-
Wrestling	-

== Hosts and Champions ==
	Year	Host	Men Champion	Women Champion	Overall Champion
I	1980	University of Peradeniya	University of Peradeniya	University of Peradeniya	University of Peradeniya
II	1983	University of Colombo	University of Colombo	University of Colombo	University of Colombo
III	1986	University of Kelaniya	University of Colombo	University of Peradeniya	University of Colombo
	1989	not held			
IV	1992	University of Sri Jayawardenapura	University of Colombo	University of Colombo	University of Colombo
V	1995	University of Moratuwa	University of Moratuwa	University of Colombo	University of Colombo
VI	1998	University of Ruhuna	University of Colombo	University of Colombo	University of Colombo
VII	2001	University of Peradeniya	University of Peradeniya	University of Peradeniya	University of Peradeniya
VIII	2004	University of Colombo	University of Moratuwa	University of Peradeniya	University of Peradeniya
IX	2007	University of Kelaniya	University of Peradeniya	University of Kelaniya	University of Peradeniya
X	2010	University of Sri Jayawardenapura	University of Moratuwa	University of Sri Jayawardenapura	University of Colombo
XI	2013	University of Moratuwa	University of Moratuwa	University of Colombo	University of Moratuwa
XII	2016	Wayamba University of Sri Lanka	University of Sri Jayewardenepura	University of Colombo	University of Sri Jayewardenepura
XIII	2019	University of Ruhuna	University of Sri Jayewardenepura	University of Colombo	University of Sri Jayewardenepura
XIV	2023	Eastern University	University of Sri Jayewardenepura	Unibersity of Sri Jayewardenepura	University of Sri Jayewardenepura
XV	2025	Rajarata university of sri lanka	University of Sri Jayewardenepura	University of Sri Jayewardenepura	University of Sri Jayewardenepura

== 9th Sri Lanka University Games 2007 ==
SLUG2007, Opening Ceremony.

SLUG2007, Opening Ceremony.

SLUG2007, 100m.

SLUG2007, Swimming.

SLUG2007, Wrestling.

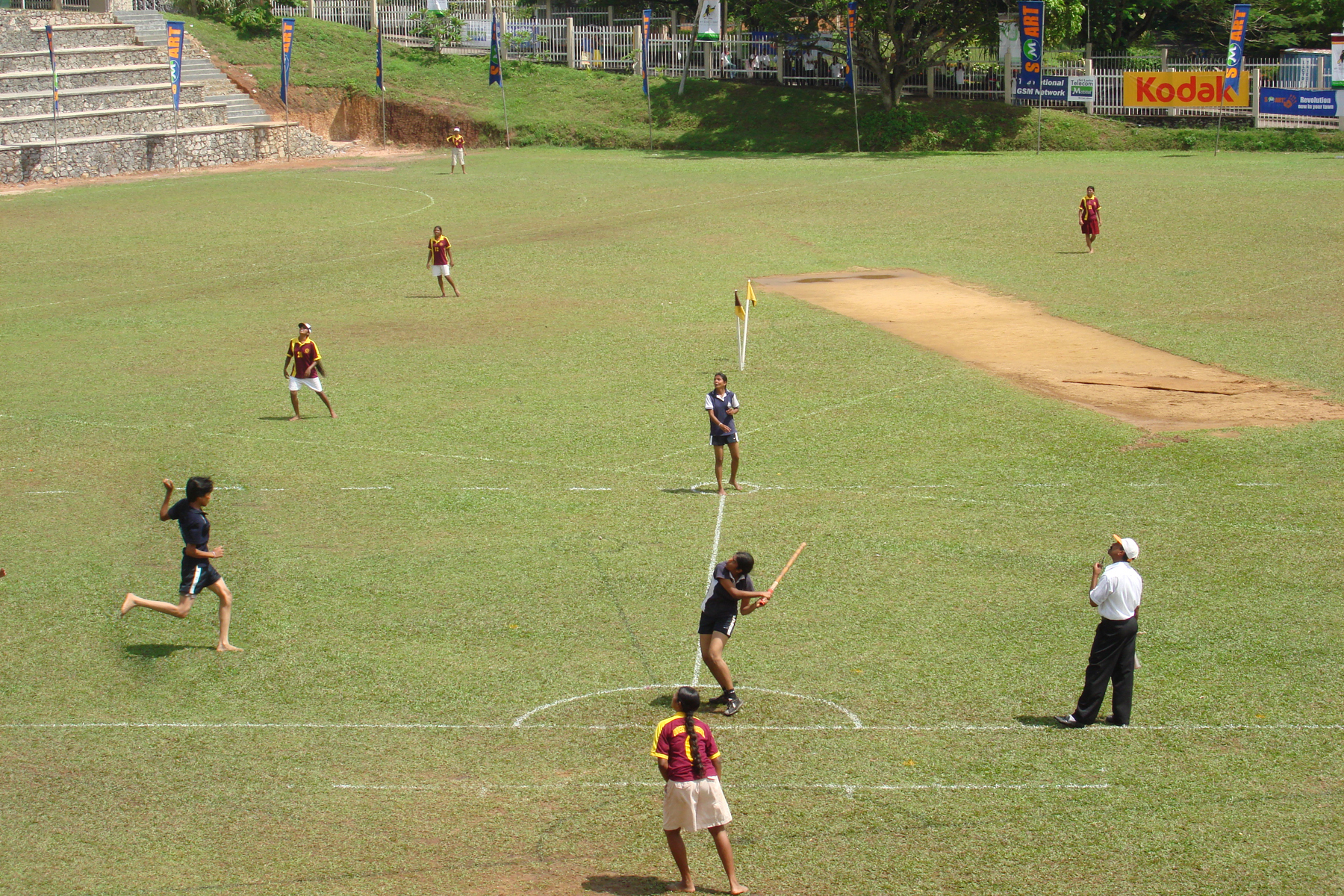
SLUG2007, Elle.

SLUG2007, Closing Ceremony.

SLUG2007, Closing Ceremony.

SLUG2007, Closing Ceremony.

The University of Kelaniya has its origin in the historic Vidyalankara Pirivena, founded in 1875 as a centre of learning for Buddhist monks. It was one of the two great national centres of traditional higher learning, heralding the first phase of the national movement and national resurgence.

With the establishment of modern Universities in Sri Lanka in the 1940s and 1950s, the Vidyalankara Pirivena became the Vidyalankara University in 1959, later the Vidyalankara Campus of the University of Ceylon in 1972 and, ultimately, the University of Kelaniya in 1978.

Today, the University of Kelaniya is one of the major national Universities. It is located just outside the municipal limits of Colombo, in the ancient and historic city of Kelaniya, on the north bank of the Kelani River. It has two major campuses, seven locations, six faculties and four institutions.

More than 5,000 participants from 13 universities will take part in the 9th University Games Festival, starting 2 November at University of Kelaniya. Around 28 events under 19 different categories of sports and the events will be held at 10 different places, including the University of Kelaniya, Sugathadasa Stadium, Royal College and the sports grounds of the National Youth Centre.

The chief guests of the festival are the Minister of Higher Education, Vishwa Warnapala, Minister of Sports, Gamini Lokuge, Chairman of the University Grants Commission, Professor Gamini Samaranayaka, Vice Chancellor of the University of Kelaniya Professor Jayantha Wijerathne and the Vice Chancellors and Deans of all the universities. In addition to that, Directors of Sports of all the universities and the directors of the sponsoring companies are also to be present at this occasion.

=== Logo and mascot ===
The logo of the SLUG is in the shape of the letter “U”. It was selected from a competition. The letter “U” was selected, because the Kelani River flows in the shape of the letter “U” when it passes Kelaniya. And the letter “U” symbolizes the whole university system. It is green, to represent the greenish lawns of the grounds and the 13 balls represent the 13 universities who take part in the SLUG.

Oriole is the mascot of this year's sports festival. It was in the Olympic Games in 1968, in Mexico that a pet was used as a mascot and it was used to control anti-Olympic ideas stirred up by student revolts and to spread good will among people.

It is for the first time that a mascot is being used in a SLUG. Oriole was chosen as the mascot because it is familiar to all Sri Lankans and also because of the close affinity it has with the area of Kelaniya in the Selalihini Sandeshaya.

Oriole is an eye catching bird because of its shining body and golden neck and legs. It was selected as the mascot of the year because the oriole is the ideal pet which represents the ethics and principles of the university games.
