= Sevvandi Jayakody =

Sri Lankan echinodermologist

Sevvandi Jayakody is a conservationist and echinodermologist from Sri Lanka, who is Senior Lecturer in the Department of Aquaculture & Fisheries at the Wayamba University of Sri Lanka.

== Career ==
Jayakody has a BSc in Zoology from the University of Kelaniya and a PhD in Zoology from the University of Aberdeen. She also has a diploma in Wildlife Management and Conservation from the Wildlife Institute of India. She joined the Sri Lankan Department of Wildlife Conservation as an Assistant Director in 1997, followed post-doctoral research at institutions in Scotland, Canada and Australia. She joined the Department of Aquaculture & Fisheries at the Wayamba University of Sri Lanka in 2001. In 2018 she was the National Coordinator for 18th Conference of the Parties of CITES. In 2021, after the submission of a report by Jayakody to Environment Minister Mahinda Amaraweera, led to the creation of a Highly-Sensitive Marine Protection Zone from Mannar to Rameswaram.

Outspoken on the subject of the climate crisis, Jayakody has commented on the necessity of restoration of mangrove habitats in Sri Lanka in order to act as carbon sinks and to protect coastlines from erosion. She is a member of the National Mangrove Expert Committee, as well as the National Mangrove Task Force, and has led calls for greater collaboration with communities living close to revived mangrove areas. Her research explores how human activities impact aquatic environments.

== Selected publications ==
- Subasinghe, Madhusha Mihirani, et al. "Potential health risk assessment of selected metal concentrations of Indian backwater oyster,(Crassostrea madrasensis) from Puttalam lagoon, Sri Lanka." (2022).
- Prakash, TG Supun Lahiru, et al. "Current perceptions and the need for a strategic plan for the whale watching industry in Mirissa, Sri Lanka." African Journal of Hospitality, Tourism and Leisure 8.3 (2019): 1-16.
- Fernando, G. K., et al. "A comparison of the larvivorous habits of exotic Poecilia reticulata and native Aplocheilus parvus." BMC ecology 18.1 (2018): 1-12.
- Arachchige, Gayashan M., et al. "A review of previous studies on the Sri Lankan echinoid fauna, with an updated species list." Zootaxa 4231.2 (2017): 151-168.
- Jayakody, S., et al. "Ecosystem Approach to Fisheries Management (Essential EAFM) training and TOT in Sri Lanka." (2015).
- Jayakody, Sevvanadi. "Provisional checklist of sea urchins (Echinodermata: Echinoidea) of Sri Lanka." The national red list (2012): 370-372.
- Jayakody, Sevvandi, et al. "Red deer Cervus elephus vigilance behaviour differs with habitat and type of human disturbance." Wildlife biology 14.1 (2008): 81-91.
- Jayakody, JADS Sevvandi. A study of the effects of human disturbance on habitat use, behaviour and diet composition in red deer (Cervus elaphus L.). University of Aberdeen (United Kingdom), 2005.
