= University of Vavuniya =

Public university in the district of Vavuniya, Sri Lanka

- வவுனியாப் பல்கலைக்கழகம் වවුනියා විශ්වවිද්‍යාලය
- Former names: University of Jaffna (Vavuniya Campus)
- Motto: நன்றின்பால் உய்ப்பது அறிவு
- Motto in English: Wisdom Guides and Restrains Toward Virtue
- Type: Public
- Established: 1 August 2021; 4 years ago
- Parent institution: University of Jaffna
- Accreditation: University Grants Commission (Sri Lanka)
- Academic affiliations: University Grants Commission (Sri Lanka); Association of Commonwealth Universities; International Association of Universities
- Chancellor: President of Sri Lanka
- Vice-Chancellor: Arulambalam; Atputharajah
- Location: Vavuniya, Northern Province, Sri Lanka; 8.7578065°N 80.3701744°E
- Campus: 195 acres (79 ha); Multi Campus
- Language: English; Tamil; Sinhala
- Colors: Melanzane & Gold
- Sporting affiliations: Sri Lanka University Games
- Website: vau.ac.lk

The University of Vavuniya (Tamil: வவுனியாப் பல்கலைக்கழகம், romanized: Vavuṉiyā Palkalaikkaḻakam; Sinhala: වවුනියා විශ්වවිද්‍යාලය, romanized: Vavuṉiyā Viśvavidyālaya; abbreviated UoV) is a public university located in the district of Vavuniya, Sri Lanka. Established in June 2021, the university was formed by the Government of Sri Lanka through the conversion of the Vavuniya Campus of the University of Jaffna into the University of Vavuniya.

== Faculty of Applied Sciences ==
=== Department of Bio-science ===
The Department of Bio-science was established in 1997. It offers a four-year degree program, the Bachelor of Science Honours in Environmental Science. The curriculum includes courses in Environmental Science and Bio-science. The program's curriculum adheres to the Outcome-Based Education and Learner-Centered Teaching (OBE-LCT) framework and the Sri Lanka Qualification Framework (SLQF) guidelines.

=== Department of Physical Science ===
Established in 1997 alongside the Faculty of Applied Science, the Department of Physical Science at the Vavuniya Campus offers several degree programs:

- Bachelor of Science in Applied Mathematics and Computing
- Bachelor of Science Honours in Computer Science
- Bachelor of Science in Information Technology
- Bachelor of Science Honours in Information Technology

The degree programs' curricula are aligned with the Outcome-Based Education and Learner-Centered Teaching (OBE-LCT) framework, the Sri Lanka Qualification Framework (SLQF), IEEE-ACM, and SBS-IT guidelines.

== Faculty of Business Studies ==
- Department of Finance and Accountancy
- Department of English Language Teaching
- Department of Project Management
- Department of Human Resource Management
- Department of Marketing Management
- Department of Business Economics
- Department of Management and Entrepreneurship

== Faculty of Technological Studies ==
- Department of Information and Communication Technology

== Organisation and Administration ==
=== Chancellor ===
Chancelloris the head of the university and is responsible for awarding all the academic degrees. Usually, the chancellor is a distinguished person in an academic discipline. Otherwise, it is a distinguished person or a clergy in the civil society. The appointment is done by the head of the state, the President of Sri Lanka. The position is mainly ceremonial and duties are usually carried out by the vice chancellor.

=== Vice-chancellor ===
The vice-chancellor is the principal academic and administrative officer of the university, responsible for the management tasks. This appointment is also done by the President of Sri Lanka.

=== Deans of Faculty ===
Deans are the heads of the faculties. They are responsible for the management and the tasks carried out by the faculty. Deans are appointed by the chancellor for three years.

- Faculty of Business Studies
- Faculty of Applied Sciences
- Faculty of Technological Studies

== Student Life ==
=== Sports and Recreation ===
The Department of Physical Education caters to the student population of the university in sports. The department gives the students sports facilities in two ways:

- Students who wish to play games only for fun and those who wish to use the facilities for fitness may use the Sports Center and the Gym
- The department conducts a regular programme for 18 sports: athletics, badminton, basketball, carom, chess, cricket, elle, football, karate, netball, rowing, rugby football, table tennis, taekwondo, tennis, volleyball, weightlifting and wrestling. The department gives the facilities necessary for these sports and supplies qualified coaches for most of the games. The aim in this regular programme is to participate in the annual inter-university and national championships.

== See also ==
- Education in Sri Lanka
- List of universities in Sri Lanka
