= Ocean University of Sri Lanka =

University for fishing, marine and nautical engineering

- ශ්‍රී ලංකා සාගර විශ්ව විද්‍යාලය
- Crest of the Ocean University of Sri Lanka
- Former names: National Institute of Fisheries and Nautical Engineering (NIFNE)
- Type: Public University
- Established: 2014; 12 years ago
- Accreditation: University Grants Commission
- Vice-Chancellor: Prof. Nalin Ratnayake
- Location: Colombo, Sri Lanka; 6.9649579°N 79.869198°E
- Website: ocu.ac.lk

Ocean University of Sri Lanka (Sinhala: ශ්‍රී ලංකා සාගර විශ්වවිද්‍යාලය, Tamil: இலங்கை சமுத்திர பல்கலைக்கழகம்) is a special purpose public university in Sri Lanka. Known earlier as the National Institute of Fisheries and Nautical Engineering, it was established in 2014 by the Ocean University of Sri Lanka Act, No. 31 of 2014 of the Parliament of Sri Lanka. The university conducts academic and professional education, including specialised degree and diploma programmes, as well as vocational training in fisheries, maritime transportation and marine engineering to fulfill and develop the needs of the maritime industry and its allied sectors in Sri Lanka.

The Ocean University of Sri Lanka Main Campus is currently located in Crow Island, Mattakuliya, Colombo 15.

On 20th October 2026, during the cabinet decisions press conference, cabinet spokesperson Nalinda Jayatissa announced that the partially built SAARC Cultural Centre premises in Nawimana, Matara will be repurposed as a permanent campus for the university.

== Administration ==
Vice-chancellor - Prof. Nalin Ratnayake

Deans -

- Faculty of Engineering and Management - Dr. S. U. Priyantha Jinadasa
- Faculty of Fisheries and Marine Sciences - Dr. W.A.A.D. Lanka Wickramasinghe

== Faculty of Engineering and Management ==
=== Department of Marine Engineering ===
The Department of Marine Engineering conducts the Bachelor of Science (Hons) in Marine Engineering programme for undergraduate students in the Crow Island main campus. It also offers a bridging course for graduates aiming to become seafaring officers to obtain their Continuous Discharge Certificate.

=== Department of Maritime Transportation Management and Logistics ===
The Department of Transportation Management and Logistics conducts the Bachelor of Science (Hons) in Maritime Transportation Management and Logistics degree programme with the Master of Science in Integrated Coastal Management (ICM) postgraduate programme.

=== Department of Coastal and Marine Resources Management ===
The Department of Coastal and Marine Resources Management conducts the Bachelor of Science (Hons) in Coastal and Marine Resources Management degree programme.

== Faculty of Fisheries and Ocean Sciences ==
The faculty conducts Bachelor of Science (Hons) in Fisheries and Marine Science, Bachelor of Technology (Hons) in Aquaculture and Seafood Technology and Bachelor of Science (Hons) in Oceanography for undergraduates.

== Diploma and certificate programmes ==
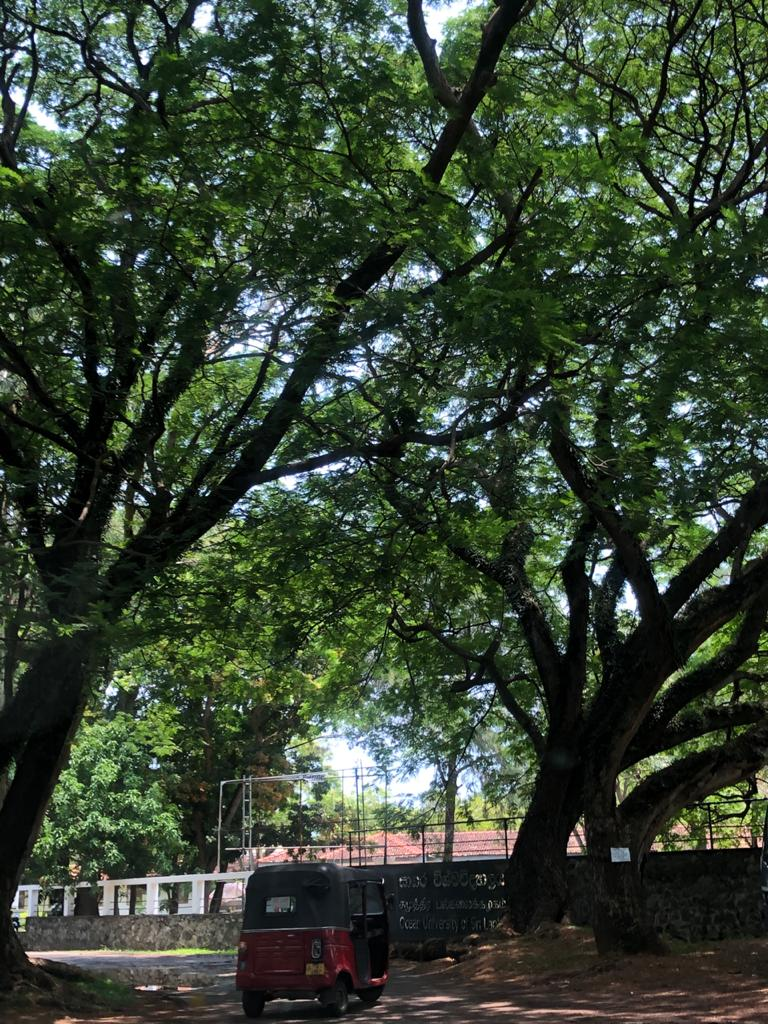
Entrance of the old building

=== Diploma programmes ===
There are several diploma programmes conducted by the university.

- Maritime & Logistic Management (NVQ level 5/6)
- Seafood Technology (NVQ level 5/6)
- Recreational Water Sports Science (NVQ level 5/6)
- Aquaculture & Aquatic Resource Management (NVQ level 5/6)
- Marine Engine and Machinery Technology (NVQ level 5)
- Fishing Technology (NVQ level 5)

=== STCW Courses ===
The university also offers courses in accordance with the Standards of Training, Certification and Watchkeeping.

- Pre Sea Training for Deck Rating (Seaman)
- Pre Sea Training for Engine Rating (Motorman)

=== Certificate programmes ===
The certificate programmes offered by the university includes:

- Marine Welding
- Scuba
- Fishing Vessel Skipper
- Lifeguard
- Machinist
- Fiberglass Technician
- Ornamental Fish Culture and Management
- Air Conditioning & Refrigerate Technician
- Marine Chart Reading, Communication and Operation of Satellite Navigators (GPS)
- Outboard Motor Technician
- Computer Graphics Designer
- Computer Application Assistance
- Fishing Gear Repair Assistant
- Fishing Harvest Technician
- Wharf Clerk

== Regional Centers ==
There are eight regional centers in addition to the main campus at Crow Island.

- Mattakkuliya
- Tangalle
- Panadura
- Galle
- Batticaloa
- Trincomalee
- Negombo
- Jaffna

== The library ==
The University Library started at the main campus Crow Island premises in 2009 with a small collection of 110 valuable books on biology, English language, and computer science. With the establishment of degree programmes in marine engineering, logistics management, and coastal management, the library collection was developed gradually. Today the collection includes valuable textbooks according to the degree programmes and other fields that are vital for the students, academic staff, and researchers.
