= State Ministry of Higher Education =

Government ministry of Sri Lanka

- උසස් අධ්‍යාපන රාජ්‍ය අමාත්‍යාංශය உயர் கல்வி இராஜாங்க அமைச்சு

Ministry overview
- Superseding Ministry: Ministry of Education
- Jurisdiction: Democratic Socialist Republic of Sri Lanka
- Headquarters: 18 Ward place, Colombo 7; 6.9166°N 79.8669°E
- Annual budget: LKR 30 billion (2018, recurrent); LKR 133 billion (2018, capital)
- Minister responsible: Vacant, State Minister of Higher Education
- Ministry executive: Mrs. J.M.B. Jayawardana, State Secretary
- Child Ministry: University Grants Commission
- Website: mohe.gov.lk

The State Ministry of Higher Education (Sinhala: උසස් අධ්‍යාපන රාජ්‍ය අමාත්‍යාංශය, romanized: Usas Adhyāpana Rājya Amātyāṅśaya; Tamil: உயர் கல்வி இராஜாங்க அமைச்சு) is a Non-cabinet ministry of the Government of Sri Lanka responsible for formulating and implementing national policy on higher education and other subjects which come under its purview. Broadly, this involves the maintenance, expansion, standardisation and general oversight and regulation of higher education institutions in the country.

The current State Minister of Higher Education is vacant.

== Ministers ==
Parties

Sri Lanka Freedom Party United National Party Sri Lanka Podujana Peramuna

Ministers of Higher Education
Name	Portrait	Party	Took office	Left office	Head of government	Ministerial title	Refs
J. R. Jayewardene		United National Party	14 February 1980		J. R. Jayewardene	Minister of Higher Education	
A. C. S. Hameed		United National Party	18 February 1989	28 March 1990	Ranasinghe Premadasa	Minister of Higher Education, Science and Technology	
Lalith Athulathmudali		United National Party	30 March 1990		Ranasinghe Premadasa	Minister of Education and Higher Education	
W. J. M. Lokubandara		United National Party	August 1993		D. B. Wijetunga	Minister of Education and Higher Education	
Richard Pathirana		Sri Lanka Freedom Party	19 August 1994		D. B. Wijetunga	Minister of Education and Higher Education	
Indika Gunawardena		Sri Lanka Freedom Party	19 October 2000		Chandrika Kumaratunga	Minister of Higher Education and Information Technology Development	
Sarath Amunugama		Sri Lanka Freedom Party	14 September 2001		Chandrika Kumaratunga	Minister of Education and Higher Education	
W. A. Wiswa Warnapala		Sri Lanka Freedom Party	28 January 2007		Mahinda Rajapaksa	Minister of Higher Education	
S. B. Dissanayake			22 November 2010		Mahinda Rajapaksa	Minister of Higher Education	
Kabir Hashim		United National Party	12 January 2015	22 March 2015	Maithripala Sirisena	Minister of Highways, Higher Education and Investment Promotion	
Sarath Amunugama		Sri Lanka Freedom Party	22 March 2015	17 August 2015	Maithripala Sirisena	Minister of Higher Education and Research	
Lakshman Kiriella		United National Party	4 September 2015	14 October 2015	Maithripala Sirisena	Minister of University Education and Highways	
Lakshman Kiriella		United National Party	14 October 2015	25 February 2018	Maithripala Sirisena	Minister of Higher Education and Highways	
Kabir Hashim		United National Party	25 February 2018	22 November 2019	Maithripala Sirisena	Minister of Higher Education and Highways	
Bandula Gunawardane		Sri Lanka Podujana Peramuna	22 November 2019		Gotabaya Rajapaksa	Minister of Higher Education, Technology and Innovation	

== Secretaries ==
Higher Education Secretaries
Name	Took office	Left office	Title	Refs
Sunil Jayantha Navaratne	22 November 2010		Higher Education Secretary	
Udaya R. Seneviratna	19 January 2015		Highways, Higher Education and Investment Promotion Secretary	
D. C. Dissanayake	8 September 2015	27 November 2019	University Education and Highways Secretary	
D.M.A.R.B. Dissanayake	27 November 2019	Present	Higher Education, Technology and Innovation Secretary	

== See also ==
- Education in Sri Lanka
- Expressways of Sri Lanka
- Higher education in Sri Lanka
- List of A-Grade highways in Sri Lanka
- List of Universities in Sri Lanka
