= Minister for Higher Education =

Minister for Higher Education may refer to:

- Minister for Higher Education (Sweden)
- Minister for Higher Education (United Kingdom)
  - Minister for Higher Education (Scotland)
- Minister for Higher Education (Victoria)

== See also ==
- Ministry of higher education
