= Gampaha Wickramarachchi University of Indigenous Medicine =

University in Sri Lanka

Coordinates: 7.0903°N 80.0368°E

- ගම්පහ වික්‍රමාරච්චි දේශීය වෛද්‍ය විශ්වවිද්‍යාලය கம்பஹா விக்கிரமராட்சி சுதேச மருத்துவப் பல்கலைக்கழகம்
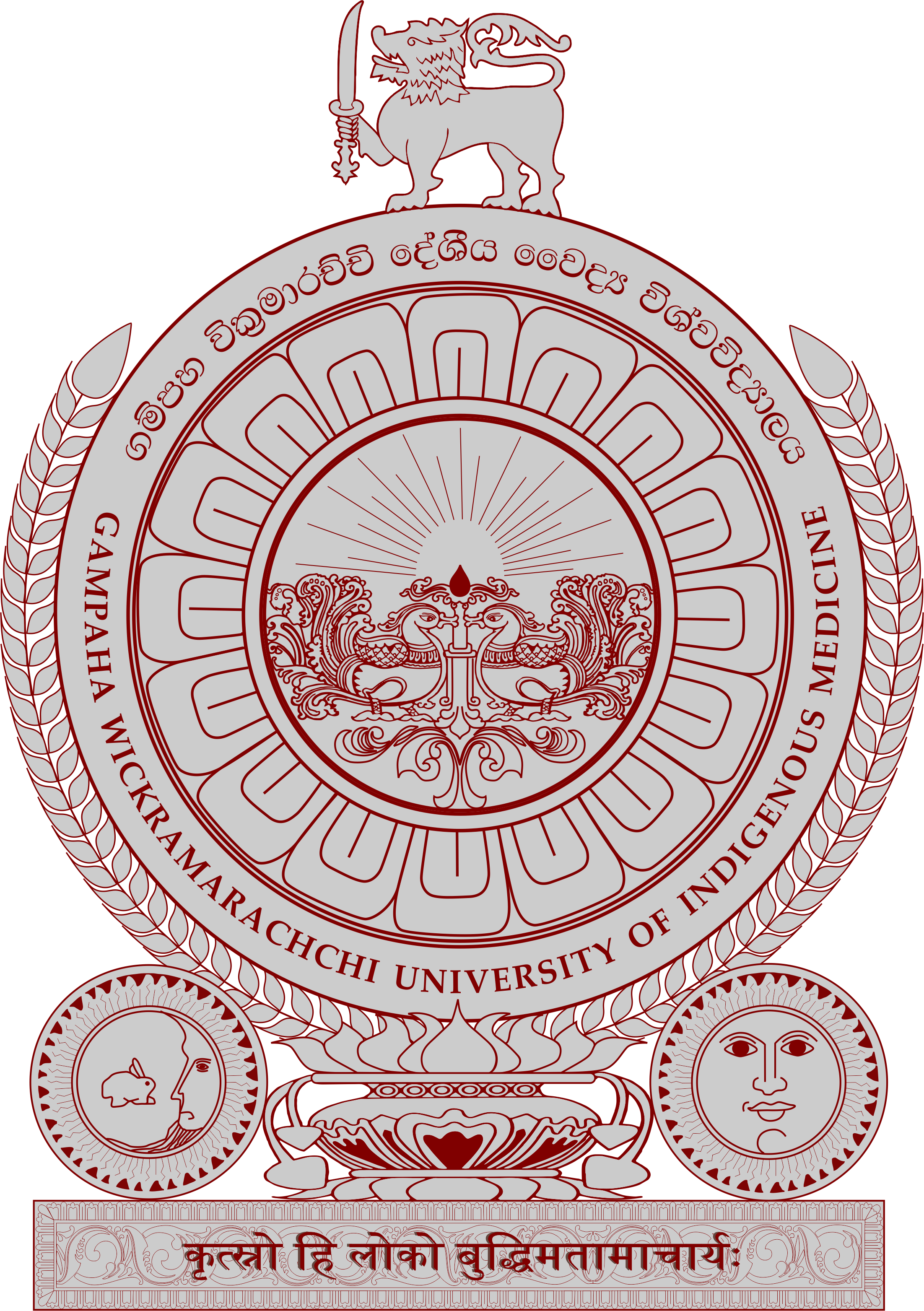
- Motto: Sanskrit: कृत्स्नो हि लोको बुद्धिमतामाचार्यः
- Motto in English: The entire world is a teacher to the intelligent
- Type: Public
- Established: 1929; 97 years ago
- Accreditation: University Grants Commission (Sri Lanka)
- Academic affiliations: University Grants Commission (Sri Lanka), Association of Commonwealth Universities, International Association of Universities
- Chancellor: Dr. Niyangoda Dharmakeerthi Sri Sangarakkitha Vijithasiri Thero
- Location: Yakkala, Sri Lanka
- Campus: Suburban
- Sporting affiliations: Sri Lanka University Games
- Website: http://gwu.ac.lk/

The Gampaha Wickramarachchi Institute, which had been affiliated with the University of Kelaniya, was elevated to university status in 2021. The decision has been described by some commentators as primarily political rather than based on long-term planning or infrastructure development.

In addition to programs in Ayurveda and Indigenous medicine, the university has introduced new degree programs in fields such as biomedical technology, health information and communication technology, and management. These expansions have drawn criticism from academic reviewers, who argue that such programs fall outside the scope of Indigenous medicine and may affect the recognition of the degrees. A five-member expert committee, including representatives of the University Grants Commission (UGC), reportedly recommended that the programs be transferred to more appropriate universities.

== History ==
In 1929, Ayurveda Cakrawarti Pandit G.P. Wickramarachchi established the Gampaha Sidayurveda Vidyalaya as a center for learning the Sidhayurveda tradition of medicine. Initially located on his personal land in Yakkala, the institute aimed to impart knowledge and expertise in herbal drug preparation and traditional medical practices to physicians. It boasted a drug manufacturing unit, hospital facilities, and a herbal garden with a rare collection of plants at its inception.

Recognizing the evolving landscape of Ayurvedic medicine and its significant contributions to the national health sector, the vidyalaya attained state recognition in 1951. This recognition enabled its diploma holders to serve in state-sector Ayurvedic hospitals. In 1982, the Vidyalaya was reconstituted as the Gampaha Wickramarachchi Ayurveda Institute under the Ministry of Indigenous Medicine through Parliamentary Act No. 30 of 1982. In 1995, it was elevated to university status.

Since 2021, following its upgrade to a university through a political decision, the Gampaha Wickramarachchi Institute has expanded its curriculum to include not only indigenous medicine but also modern medicine, technology, management, and other disciplines, as outlined in the Sri Lanka University Grants Commission handbook. However, this expansion has reportedly occurred without adequate facilities, proper division of faculties, or appropriate planning for the new degree programs.

== Academics ==
The institute's academic staff is allocated to the five academic departments based on their specialization and teaching expertise as below;

1. Departments of Ayurveda Fundamentals
2. Departments of Anatomy
3. Departments of Dravyaguna
4. Departments of Indigenous Rasa-Bahisajja
5. Departments of Rogavignana
6. Departments of Kayacikitsa
7. Departments of Desheeyacikitsa
8. Departments of Kaumaravurtha & stree roga
9. Departments of Shalya salakya
10. Departments of Languages
11. Departments of Modern Sciences & Technology

=== Undergraduate programs ===
The Gampaha Wickramarachchi University offers:

- A Bachelor of Ayurveda Medicine and Surgery degree. This is a six-year course including one-year internship training in state hospitals.

The Bachelor’s degrees in technology-related fields, such as Biomedical Technology and Health information technology, are currently in high demand due to their relevance in modern healthcare and industry. However, according to expert committee assessments, the current facilities and infrastructure at Gampaha Wickramarachchi University are not suitable to effectively deliver these programs. Experts have recommended that such degrees be transferred to a more appropriate university with the necessary resources and faculty. Despite these findings, the government and relevant authorities have remained silent, and no action has been taken to address the issue.

- A Bachelor of Health Science Honours in Biomedical Technology degree program that teaches skills to work in the biomedical technology field in modern medicine.
- A Bachelor of Health Science Honours in Health Information And Communication Technology degree program that teaches skills to Work in ICT Field And healthcare industry .

=== Postgraduate programs ===
The Gampaha Wickramarachchi Ayurveda Institute offers following postgraduate diplomas and master's degrees across disciplines in Kayacikitsa, Panchakarma and management and administration of Ayurveda institutions.

==== Postgraduate diplomas ====
- Postgraduate Diploma in Management and Administration of Ayurveda Institutions

==== Master's degrees ====
- Master of Science in Kāyacikitsā
- Master of Science in Pañcakarma
- Master of Science in Management and Administration of Ayurveda Institutions

=== Other programs ===
- Diploma In Yoga And Relaxation (DYR)
- Diploma in Ayurveda Pharmaceuticals
- Certificate Course in Yoga and Relaxation Techniques (CCYR)
- Certificate Course in Ayurveda Beauty Culture
- Certificate Course in Ultrasound Scanning

== Ministry of Education (Sri Lanka) ==
The Bachelor of Health Science Honours in Biomedical Technology is a highly demanded degree program, as it combines modern medicine with advanced technology to support healthcare innovation. Graduates in this field are crucial for maintaining medical equipment, driving research, and implementing technological solutions that directly improve patient care.

However, the current university offering this program is not suitable to deliver it effectively. The institution lacks the necessary facilities, expertise, and infrastructure to meet the academic and professional standards required for a program of this importance.

As highlighted by the Education Ministry and the expert committee, Biomedical Technology is a modern medicine and technology–oriented discipline, with no relation to Ayurveda or indigenous medicine. Therefore, the recommendation is that this program should be absorbed into a more appropriate university—one that can ensure quality education, proper resources, and alignment with national healthcare priorities.

== Gampaha Wickramarachchi Ayurveda Teaching Hospital ==
Gampaha Wickramarachchi Sidhayurveda Medical College establish in 1929 by Pandit G.P Wickramarachchi with the aims of improving Ayurveda Medicine and provided treated freely. In 1984 it was upgraded to the hospital and on 27 February 2008, it was affiliated by the Department of Ayurveda. At present this hospital has four wards that can accommodate 120 patients. In addition, there is an outpatient department and a pharmacy. This Ayurveda Teaching hospital provides Teaching and training facilities to undergraduate Medical student of the Gampaha Wickramarachchi Ayurveda Institute.

== See also ==
- University Grants Commission (Sri Lanka)
