= Institute of Engineering Technology, Sri Lanka =

Diploma awarding institute in Katunayake, Sri Lanka

Institute of Engineering Technology
- Established: 1985
- Mission: Provide technical personnel of excellence to the industry
- Formerly called: Technician Training Institute (TTI)
- Location: Temple Road, Katunayake, Sri Lanka
- Coordinates: 7.156571°N 79.873778°E
- Interactive map of Institute of Engineering Technology
- Website: iet.edu.lk

The Institute of Engineering Technology (IET) (Sinhala: ඉංජිනේරු තාක්ෂණ ආයතනය, Tamil: எந்திரவியல் தொழில்நுட்ப நிறுவனம்) is a diploma-awarding institute in Katunayake, Sri Lanka, specializing in the field of engineering. IET awards the National Diploma in Engineering Sciences (NDES), and was established as the Technician Training Institute (TTI) in 1985 to educate and train mid-level engineers in various engineering-based and allied fields.

== Courses ==
IET awards the National Diploma in Engineering Sciences under the three major fields of civil engineering, electrical engineering and mechanical engineering, and eight sub-fields.
There are 8 sub fields under above three fields; those are,

- Civil Engineering
  - Civil Building and Structural Engineering
  - Civil Highway and Railway Engineering
  - Civil Water and Environmental Engineering
- Electrical Engineering
  - Electronic & Communication Engineering
  - Power Engineering
- Mechanical Engineering
  - Mechanical Automobile Engineering
  - Mechanical General (Production and Controlling) Engineering
  - Mechanical Marine Engineering ( with ISO 9001:2000 Quality Assurance Standard)

== Location ==
The institute is situated near the Bandaranaike International Airport, Katunayake at 18th Milepost on Colombo Negombo Road. The distance is around 30 km from Colombo and it takes around 45–60 minutes to reach the institute via main road or from Colombo-Katunayake Expressway it can reach around 15 minutes.
