= National Institute of Library and Information Sciences =

The National Institute of Library and Information Sciences (NILIS), University of Colombo (Sinhala: ජාතික පුස්තකාල හා විඥාපන විද්‍යා අධ්‍යයන ආයතනය) is an institution affiliated to the University of Colombo. NILIS focuses on graduate education in Library Science, and Information Management.

== Objectives ==
It is estimated that Sri Lanka has about 10,000 libraries and information centres are there, scattered in the higher education, education, government, semi-government, local government, private, non-governmental organization and other sectors. Up to the year 2000 only University of Kelaniya provided degree and postgraduate courses at university level in the field. With the establishment of NILIS, the postgraduate and general training facilities in the field has been expanded. The primary objective of the institute is to train the human resources required for the huge school library sector in the country. In addition it has been empowered by the NILIS Ordinance of 1999 to conduct other postgraduate programmes in the Library and Information Science (LIS) field and produce the necessary high quality human resources for universities, research institutes, government departments, local government authorities and other library and information sectors in the country. Another major objective is to develop a continuing professional development (CPD) programmes for LIS professionals to update and upgrade their skills and knowledge.

== History ==
The National Institute of Library and Information Sciences (NILIS), University of Colombo was established in 1999. The purpose of the institute is to provide postgraduate and general training facilities in the Library and Information Science field with special attention to the school/teacher librarianship. The establishment of the institute was a result of the World Bank funded General Education Project 2, (GEP 2). The purpose of the GEP 2 was to improve the different education sectors in Sri Lanka including the School Library sector. Under the project 4,000 school libraries were developed. When the World Bank mission was working in close cooperation with the National Library and Documentation Services Board (NLDSB) which was the local counterpart of the School Library sub sector, the NLDSB proposed to establish a training institute to support the school library development programme at the latter part of the project. The proposal was accepted and the World Bank advisory team of the project invited the NLDSB to submit a suitable proposal for consideration. Then NLDSB developed the NILIS project proposal with the help of a local consultant (Prof. W B Dorakumbura) who prepared the proposal with the assistance of the professional staff of NLDSB. They used the initial University Grants Commission (UGC) Inter University Committee of Librarians (IUCL) proposal to establish a Postgraduate Institute in Library and Information Science. However, they developed a new proposal to meet the special requirements of the school library sector and LIS sector in general with special attention to the objectives of the GEP 2 project. This proposal was accepted by the authorities with minor modifications and became the foundation of the NILIS.
