= Rajarata University of Sri Lanka =

University in Sri Lanka

- ශ්‍රී ලංකා රජරට විශ්වවිද්‍යාලය இலங்கை ரஜரட்ட பல்கலைக்கழகம்
- Type: Public
- Established: 31 January 1996; 30 years ago
- Accreditation: University Grants Commission (Sri Lanka)
- Academic affiliations: University Grants Commission (Sri Lanka), Association of Commonwealth Universities, International Association of Universities
- Chancellor: Ven. Etalawetunawawe Gnanathilaka Maha Thero
- Vice-Chancellor: Dr. PHG Janaka Pushpakumara
- Academic staff: 275
- Administrative staff: 32
- Students: 7814
- Undergraduates: 7814
- Location: Mihintale, Sri Lanka and Anuradhapura, Sri Lanka
- Language: Sinhala, Tamil and English
- Colours: Maroon, Yellow
- Sporting affiliations: Sri Lanka University Games
- Website: www.rjt.ac.lk

Rajarata University of Sri Lanka (Sinhala: ශ්‍රී ලංකා රජරට විශ්වවිද්‍යාලය, Tamil: இலங்கை ரஜரட்ட பல்கலைக்கழகம், abbreviated RUSL) is a public university located in the historic city of Mihintale, near Anuradhapura, Sri Lanka. The Rajarata University of Sri Lanka was established as the eleventh University in Sri Lanka and was opened on 31 January 1996 by President Chandrika Kumaratunga.

Over the years, the university has developed to become a centre of excellence in higher education in the North Central Province as well as in Sri Lanka. The academic programs of the RUSL are offered by six faculties namely; Technology, Agriculture, Applied Sciences, Management Studies, Medicine and Allied Sciences and Social Sciences and Humanities. The main administrative complex, the Faculties of Applied Sciences, Technology, Management Studies and Social Sciences and Humanities are located at Mihintale while the Faculty of Agriculture and Faculty of Medicine Allied Sciences are located at Puliyankulama and Saliyapura, respectively.

== History ==
Rajarata University was established as the eleventh National University in Sri Lanka and was opened on 31 January 1996 by President Chandrika Bandaranayake, in accordance with the Gazette Notification 896/2 and the University Act 16 of 1978.

The official opening ceremony was attended by Prime MinisterSirimavo Bandaranayake, Speaker Kiri Banda Ratnayake, Minister of Higher Education Richard Pathirana, Deputy Minister of Higher Education Wiswa Warnapala, Governor NCP Maithripala Senanayake, Chairman UGC Prof. Stanley Thilakaratne, the university's first vice chancellor Prof. W.I. Siriweera and the university's first chancellor, Jayantha Kelegama.

Having examined the social variables encountered by Sri Lanka in the two decades 1970 and 1980, the then government decided to establish affiliated university colleges to provide opportunities for higher education for youth who are qualified but deprived of university education. Consequently, affiliated university colleges were established in Makandura, Kuliyapitiya and Anuradhapura. Subsequently, on 7 November 1995, the affiliated universities were amalgamated and the affiliated university of Kuliyapitiya and Makandura were named as Wayamba Campus of Rajarata University of Sri Lanka.

At the inception, four faculties namely Faculty of Social Sciences and Humanities, Faculty of Management Studies, Faculty of Agriculture and Faculty of Applied Sciences were established and in the year 2006, the Faculty of Medicine and Allied Sciences was established as the fifth faculty of RUSL. The faculties of Social Sciences and Humanities, Faculty of Management Studies and Faculty of Applied Sciences are located in the Mihintale premises while the Faculties of Agriculture and Medicine and Allied Sciences are situated in Puliyankulama and Saliyapura respectively.

In November 1995 the Rajarata University of Sri Lanka (RUSL) was established by the Gazette Notification No: 896/2 of 7 November 1995 in the administrative District of Anuradhapura. The Central Province Affiliated University College (CPAUC) in Polgolla, located 140 km from the main campus at Mihinthale, Anuradhapura was amalgamated to the RUSL as its Faculty of Applied Sciences (FASc). The immediate task of the FASc was to upgrade all the students of the CPAUC who had successfully completed their diploma requirements, to the graduate level. On this task the FASc was inaugurated on 10 January 1997 to commence the third-year degree programme with a batch of 102 students, who graduated in 1998. The first batch of students who were directly sent by the UGC to follow the degree programme was enrolled in November 1997.

After functioning for nearly 10 years at Polgolla, the faculty was established in the main campus at Mihinthale, on 16 January 2006 upon completion of Stage I of the building complex.

== Faculties ==
The university consists of six faculties, Technology, Applied Sciences, Agriculture, Management Studies, Medicine and Applied Sciences, Social Sciences and Humanities

=== Faculty of Agriculture (FA) ===
Faculty of Agriculture (FA) offers B.Sc. Agriculture(Special) four-year degree in Agriculture On the recommendation of the committee on affiliated University colleges (1994), nine Affiliated University colleges spread out in various provinces of the country were merged to form two National Universities, the Rajarata and the Sabaragamuwa University of Sri Lanka in 1996. The Affiliated University college of the North Western province which consisted of two academic sections namely; Home science and Nutrition and the Agriculture, originally affiliated with the University of Kelaniya and Peradeniya respectively, were merged to form the Wayamba Campus of the Rajarata University in terms of the provisions of the section 18 and 47(1) of the University act. No 16 of 1978 and campus board ordinance NO: 3 of 1995. Two faculties were set up to form the Wayamba Campus namely, the faculty of Agricultural Science and the faculty of Applied Sciences, each with three departments of study. The Faculty of Agricultural Sciences constituted the Department of plantation Management, Horticultural Sciences and Food Technology and Agricultural Engineering. A three-year general degree in Agricultural Science was offered. Later in 1999, a committee was appointed to make recommendations to upgrade the Wayamba Campus to a fully-fledged university. Based on the recommendations of this committee the Wayamba University was established in August 1999. With that faculty of Agricultural Sciences taken over to the Wayamba University in 1999 and Rajarata University loses its Agriculture Faculty. In the year 2001, a new Agriculture Faculty of the Rajarata University has incepted at Puliyankulama closes to ancient Anuradhapura and about ten kilometers away from Mihintale where administration building complex and other sister faculties were located. It was started at a renovated paddy store complex where the faculty of Social Sciences and Humanities was located earlier. From the beginning, there were three departments:

- Department of Agricultural Systems
- Department of Plant Sciences.
- Department of Agricultural Engineering and Soil Science
- Department of Animal and food science.

A new curricular was designed with the objective of uplifting dry zone agriculture and awarded a BSc degree in agriculture, which is a four-year special degree. The first batch of 17 students was recruited on 21 April 2001 under the patronage of the first dean of the Faculty of Agriculture at Puliyankulama Prof. S.H. Upasena. From that two comprehensive curriculum revisions were carried out in 2003 and 2006. The total annual intake is 100 students today.

=== Faculty of Applied Sciences (FASc) ===
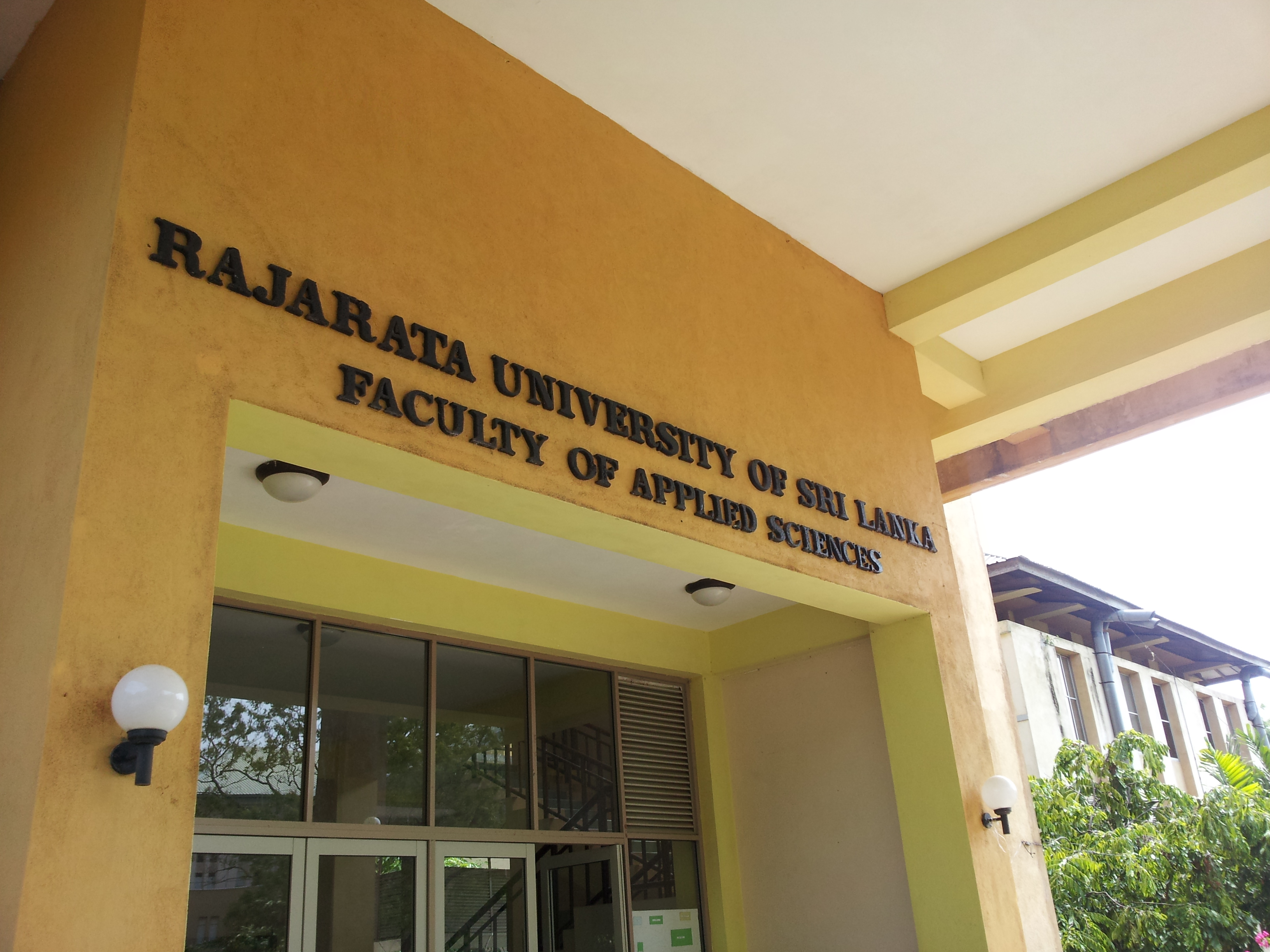
FASc main hall

The following degree programs are offered by the FASc.

The Department of Biological Sciences

General Degrees (3 Year)

- B.Sc. in Applied Sciences

Honors Degrees (4 Year)

- B.Sc. Honors in Applied Sciences
- B.Sc. Joint Major in Biology & Physics
- B.Sc. Honors in Applied Biology (Specialization area Biodiversity & Conservation)
- B.Sc. Honors in Applied Biology (Specialization area Fisheries & Aquaculture Management)
- B.Sc. Honors in Applied Biology (Specialization area Microbiology)

Department of Chemical Ciences

- Bachelor of Science in Applied Sciences
- Bachelor of Science Honours in Applied Sciences
- Bachelor of Science Honours in Chemistry
- Bachelor of Science Honours in Chemistry and Physics

Department of Computing

- Bachelor of Science in Information Technology (B.Sc. in IT)

Department of Health Promotion

- Bachelor’s degree in the region dedicated for Health Promotion

Department of Physical Sciences

General Degrees

- B.Sc. (General) 3 year degree in Applied Sciences

4 Year Degrees

- B.Sc. 4 year degree in Applied Sciences
- B.Sc. 4 year degree in Industrial Mathematics
- B.Sc. (Joint Major) 4 year degree in Chemistry & physics
- B.Sc. 4 year degree in Computer Science
- B.Sc. (Special) degree in Chemistry

The FASc, Mihintale consists of five departments: Biological Sciences, Physical Sciences, Chemical Sciences, Health Promotion and Computing. The Department of Biological Sciences offers courses in the fields of Botany/Zoology/Biology while the Department of Physical Sciences offers courses in the fields of Chemistry, Physics, Pure Mathematics, Applied Mathematics and Computer Science and Information and Communication Technology.

All the courses are offered in English.

=== Faculty of Management Studies ===
Faculty of Management Studies offers first-level and postgraduate degrees. It consists of four departments that offer B.Sc. degrees in

- B.Sc. (Special) in Accountancy & Finance
- B.Sc. (Special) in Business Management
- B.Sc. (Special) in Tourism & Hospitality Management
- B.Sc. (Special) in Business Information Technology

These degree programmes are conducted in English. The Faculty of Management Studies, Rajarata University is the only faculty that offers B.Sc. Degrees in Tourism & Hospitality Management and Business Information Technology in Sri Lanka.

Postgraduate studies involves postgraduate diplomas, MBA and Msc (Management).

=== Faculty of Medicine and Allied Sciences (FMAS) ===
This faculty was established in response to a critical situation arising from an error in the grading of the advanced level (A/L) examination chemistry paper. This error led to an additional 120 students becoming eligible for enrollment in Sri Lankan public medical schools. The inaugural acting dean was Professor Malkanthi Chandrasekara, succeeded by Professor Malani Udupihille. In 2013, a significant milestone was achieved as the first permanent staff member assumed the role of dean.

Originally conceived for a cohort of 120 students, unforeseen circumstances in the nation in 2006 prompted the inclusion of an additional 60 students from an eastern university into FMAS. Subsequently, the annual intake steadily grew to accommodate nearly 180 students each year until 2020. Presently, the faculty welcomes approximately 210 students.

Over the years, distinguished individuals have served as deans, including Professor Sisira Siribaddana (2013-19), Dr. Senaka Pilapitiya (2020-21), Professor Suneth Agampodi (2022), and Dr. Janaka Pushpakumara (2022-), each contributing to the ongoing legacy of this esteemed institution.

=== Faculty of Social Sciences and Humanities (FSSH) ===
Faculty of Social Sciences and Humanities continues to function from the inception of the university in 1995. The Faculty of Faculty of Social Sciences and Humanities is the oldest in the Rajarata University and located in great historical Mihinthale premises. Three departments were assigned with Faculty of Social Sciences and Humanities. in 2015 another two department were assigned to the Faculty of Social Sciences and Humanities and there are five departments by now.

- Department of Social Sciences
- Department of Humanities
- Department of Archaeology and Heritage Management
- Department of Environmental Management
- Department of Languages
- Department of English Language Teaching
- Department of Economics

=== Faculty of Technology (FOT) ===
The Technology Programme inaugurated at the FASc in January 2017 and that one is south Asia biggest technology faculty. Despite the commencement of these programmers under FASc, a separate Faculty of Technology is to be established in due course which includes five departments and accommodating an estimated intake of 245 students annually.

The Technology Faculty consist of five Departments leading to their respective degree programmes:

- Department of Materials Technology - MTT
- Department of Electrical & Electronic Technology- ENT
- Department of Bioprocess Technology- BPT
- Department of Food Technology- FDT
- Department of Information & Communication Technology- ITT

The curricula under these degrees follow a hands-on approach with more applied course contents than fundamentals, thereby fulfilling the needs and voids of the respective industries of the country for which the degree programmes are meant to cater. All courses under the Technology Programme are offered in English medium. As such, the students are required to follow an intensive English Language course for the purpose of following the lecture material, as well as in preparation for their future endeavours upon successful completion of the degree programmes.

== Library ==
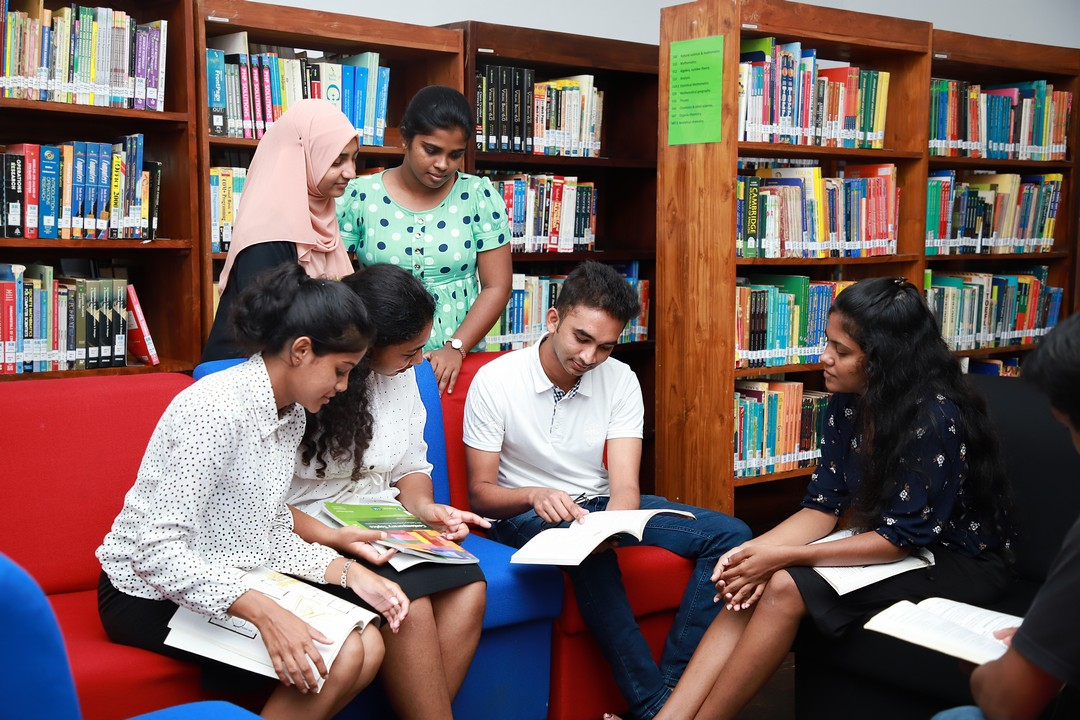
Inside the library, Rajarata University of Sri Lanka

The Main Library of Rajarata University is located in the Mihintale Premises and houses an extensive collection of books, journals, and other academic resources. The library has a seating capacity of more than 500 students and is equipped with modern facilities such as Wi-Fi, air conditioning, and comfortable seating areas.

The university library system consists of a main library and several branch libraries that are spread across the university’s different faculties such as Applied Science, Agriculture, Medicine & Allied Sciences, and Technology.

The university received subscriptions of the following databases for the online materials. Library users can access the database within the university premises.

- Emerald Insight
- Oxford Academic
- Taylor and Francis
- Hinari, AGORA, OARE, ARDI, GOALI
