= Ministry of higher education =

Government department concerning higher education

A Ministry of Higher Education is a government department that focuses on the provision or regulation of institutions of higher education. In some countries these exist as ministries compounded with other responsibilities like the oversight of scientific research.

== Examples ==
- Ministry of Higher Education (Afghanistan)
- Ministry of Higher Education and Scientific Research (Algeria)
- Ministry of Higher Education and Science (Denmark)
- Ministry of Higher Education, Science and Culture (East Timor)
- Ministry of Higher Education (Egypt)
- Ministry of Higher Education, Research and Innovation, France
- Ministry of Science, Research and Technology (Iran)
- Ministry of Higher Education and Scientific Research (Iraq)
- Ministry of Higher Education and Scientific Research (Ivory Coast)
- Ministry of Higher Education and Scientific Research (Jordan)
- Ministry of Education and Higher Education (Lebanon)
- Ministry of Higher Education and Scientific Research (Madagascar)
- Ministry of Higher Education (Malaysia)
- Ministry of Higher Education (Oman)
- Ministry of Science and Higher Education (Poland)
- Ministry of Science, Technology and Higher Education (Portugal)
- Ministry of Higher Education and Highways (Sri Lanka)
- Ministry of Higher Education (Soviet Union)
- Ministry of Higher Education (South Africa)
- Ministry of Higher Education, Science and Technology (disambiguation): Dominican Republic, Indonesia, Kenya, South Sudan, Tanzania, and Zimbabwe
- Ministry of Higher Education, Science, Research and Innovation (Thailand)
- Ministry of Higher Education and Scientific Research (Tunisia)
- Ministry of Higher Education and Scientific Research (UAE)
- Ministry of Science and Higher Education (Ethiopia)
- Ministry of Higher Education (Syria)
- Ministry of Higher Education, Labour and Skills Development, Maldives

== See also ==
- Ministry of Higher Education and Research
- Ministry of National Education
- Minister for Higher Education (disambiguation)
