= Belihuloya =

- Village
- Location within Sri Lanka
- Coordinates: 6°43′5″N 80°46′2″E
- Country: Sri Lanka
- Province: Sabaragamuwa Province
- Time zone: UTC+5:30 (Sri Lanka Standard Time Zone)
  - Summer (DST): UTC+6 (Summer time)
- Postal code: 70140

Belihuloya is a village in the Ratnapura District, Sabaragamuwa Province of Sri Lanka. It is approximately 150 kilometres (93 mi) south-east of Colombo and is situated at an elevation of 616 metres (2,021 ft) above sea level. This hillside location is a climatically transitional area, linking both the dry and wet zones and the hill and low country. Belihuloya is derived from the Belih Oya ("Oya" being the Sinhala word for river), which flows through the area.

== Transport ==
It is located on Colombo Batticaloa Hwy.

== Natural attractions ==
The area around Belihuloya contains a number of waterfalls, including:

- Pahanthuda Ella (also known as Galagama Ella) - The base of this 4.6 metres (15 ft) waterfall is shaped like an oil lamp. The name Pahanthuda is derived from the Sinhala word “pahana” for lamp. It is located approximately 1.5 kilometres (0.93 mi) from Belihuloya.
- Bambarakanda Ella (also known as Bambarakele Ella) - The highest waterfall in Sri Lanka, it is 263 m (863 ft) in height and ranks as the 299th highest waterfall in the world. It is located approximately 18 kilometres (11 mi) from Belihuloya.
- Surathalee Ella waterfall slides down along a rock wall on the eastern slope of Mt Ellamana for approximately 20 metres (66 ft), forming this waterfall. It is located 8 kilometres (5.0 mi) from Belihuloya.
- Brampton Falls - The tributary of Weli Oya flows down the eastern slopes of Mt Papulagala (1530m) forming several cascades among the trees of the surrounding monsoon forest. This fall is approximately 6 metres (20 ft) in height and is located amongst several other smaller falls. It is located about 10 kilometres (6.2 mi) from Belihuloya.
- Papulagala Ella - Located in the Brampton Estate (Tea Plantation) on the slopes of Mt. Papulagala. During the rains a brook forms this waterfall, which is about 30 metres (98 ft) high. It is located 5 kilometres (3.1 mi) east of Belihuoya at Lower Hiralouvah
- Hirikatuwa Oya - It is located about 4 kilometres (2.5 mi) from Belihuloya. Along the road to the Nonpareil estate about 2 km, a car park for this popular bathing place is found.

== Physical attractions ==
- Samanala Dam is the second-largest hydroelectric scheme in Sri Lanka, generating 405 GWh of energy annually. The dam is located 9.4 kilometres (5.8 mi) south of Belihuloya.

== Education ==
The Sabaragamuwa University of Sri Lanka is located 500 m (1,600 ft) from the Pambahinna Junction, on the A4 highway which runs through Belihuloya. Administratively the university belongs to the Imbulpe Divisional Secretariat and the Rathnapura District in Sabaragamuwa Province.
