= Mattakkuliya =

Mattakkuliya මට්ටක්කුලිය மட்டக்குளி
- Suburb
- Location within Greater Colombo Location within Colombo District Location within Sri Lanka
- Coordinates: 6°54′0″N 79°52′0″E
- Country: Sri Lanka
- Province: Western Province
- District: Colombo District
- Time zone: UTC+5:30 (Sri Lanka Standard Time Zone)
- Postal Code: 01500

Mattakkuliya is a suburb in Colombo, Sri Lanka. It is part of an area referred to as Colombo 15.

== Schools ==
- Razik Fareed Muslim Vidyalaya
- Northshore College of Business and Technology.

== Places of worship ==
- Ceylon Pentecostal Mission Church
- Zaviyathul Khairiyya Jumu'ah Masjidh
- St. Mary's Church
- Al Masjidhul Dheeniya
- Sri Kalyani Ganagarama Temple
- New Apostolic Church
- Al Masjidhul Ilahiya
- Masjidhul badriya
- Open Heaven Life Church
- St. John's Church
- Methodist Church
