= Buddhasravaka Bhiksu University =

University in Sri Lanka

Bhikkhu University of Sri Lanka
- Type: Public
- Established: 1996; 30 years ago
- Principal: Most Ven. Karagoda Uyangoda Maithree Murthi Mahanayaka Thero
- Location: Anuradhapura, Sri Lanka
- Website: http://busl.ac.lk

Bhiksu University of Sri Lanka was founded in 1996 and is located in Anuradhapura in Sri Lanka. Bhiksu University of Sri Lanka is situated in a location which surrounds Sri Maha Bodhi Tree, Swarnamali Stupa in Eight Sacred Places (Atamastana) and ancient Mihintale that was established with the Buddhist culture by Ven. Arahant Maha Mahinda Thero who introduced Buddhism to Sri Lanka.

Having started by the name Buddhasravaka Dharma Peetha in the year 1969, this great educational institution was renamed as Buddhasravaka Bhiksu University in the year 1996 and Bhiksu University of Sri Lanka in the year 2012 but the objective of the first University Act remains unchanged. The administrative structure of the University consists of the Supreme Council, the Council and the Senate and the Faculty Boards for administering academic matters.

Chancellor, Vice Chancellor who is the Chief Executive Officer and the Chief Academic Officer, Deans and Heads together with the academic staff who work towards the accomplishment of students’ academic affairs with Registrar, Bursar, Librarian, Senior Assistant Registrars, Assistant Bursar, and Assistant Registrars and the non-academic staff members are among those who work for the progress of the University. The library that enriches the knowledge of students and exam branch that measures the knowledge of students also a part of this.

== Notable alumni ==
- Bodagama Chandima (born 1957), Buddhist monk
