= Wayamba University of Sri Lanka =

University in Sri Lanka

- ශ්‍රී ලංකා වයඹ විශ්වවිද්‍යාලය இலங்கை வயம்ப பல்கலைக்கழகம்
- Type: Public University
- Established: 1991; 35 years ago Affiliated University College of North Western Province, 1996; 30 years ago Rajarata University of Sri Lanka "Wayamba mandapa", 1999; 27 years ago Wayamba University of Sri Lanka
- Accreditation: University Grants Commission (Sri Lanka)
- Academic affiliations: University Grants Commission (Sri Lanka), Association of Commonwealth Universities, International Association of Universities
- Chancellor: Tuley De Silva
- Vice-Chancellor: P.A. Kiriwandeniya
- Students: 5000
- Location: Kuliyapitiya and Makandura (NWP), Sri Lanka; 7.46898554°N 80.0220467°E
- Colours: Maroon & gold
- Sporting affiliations: Sri Lanka University Games
- Website: www.wyb.ac.lk

Wayamba University of Sri Lanka (Sinhala: ශ්‍රී ලංකා වයඹ විශ්වවිද්‍යාලය, romanized: śrī laṁkā vayam̆ba viśvavidyālaya, Tamil: இலங்கை வயம்ப பல்கலைக்கழகம், romanized: Ilaṅkai vayampa palkalaikkaḻakam) is the thirteenth national university in Sri Lanka. It was established as the Affiliated University College of North Western Province in 1991 and it became the Rajarata University of Sri Lanka "Wayamba mandapa" in 1996. It was a full-fledged university naming as Wayamba University of Sri Lanka in 1999. The main purpose of the university is offering English-medium degrees, diplomas and certificate courses (internal and external) in areas such as Agriculture, Applied Science, Management and Technology for students and working professionals. The courses are highly up-to-date and job-oriented.

The Wayamba University of Sri Lanka is headquartered at Kuliyapitiya, Sri Lanka. Its six faculties are in Makandura and Kuliyapitiya. The Faculty of Applied Sciences, Faculty of Business Studies, Finance and Faculty of Technology and Faculty of Medicine were established at Kuliyapitiya. The Faculty of Agriculture and Plantation Management and the Faculty of Livestock, Fisheries, and Nutrition are in Makandura. The Medical Faculty is located in the Labuyaya.

== Faculty of Agriculture and Plantation Management ==
The Faculty of Agriculture and Plantation Management is the oldest in the university and is located in Makandura premises. Four departments were assigned to the faculty of Agriculture and Plantation Management.

- Department of Agribusiness management
- Department of Biotechnology
- Department of Horticulture and Landscape Gardening
- Department of Plantation Management
- Department of Bio Systems Engineering

== Faculty of Applied Sciences ==
The Faculty of Applied Sciences was established with effect from 1 October 1999 by the Government Notification in the Extraordinary Gazette No. 1093/8 of Tuesday, 17 August 1999. The faculty is in Kuliyapitiya and was assigned with four Departments of study.

- Department of Computing & Information Systems
- Department of Electronics
- Department of Industrial Management
- Department of Mathematical Sciences

=== Department of Computing & Information Systems ===
The Department of Computing and Information Systems is one of four departments in the Faculty of Applied Science. It is one of the earliest departments in the university, having been established in 1999.

The department offers course modules along with projects and an industrial training programme.

=== Department of Electronics ===
The Department of Electronics was initiated in 2000 under the Faculty of Applied Sciences. This is the only department in the University System, which offers Electronics as a major subject for Physical Science undergraduates.

=== Department of Mathematical Sciences ===
The Department of Mathematical Sciences is one of the most important departments in the Faculty of Applied Sciences. The department commenced academic activities in 1996, the oldest department in the Faculty. Around 30-40 students enrolled in the courses every year.

Although the computer laboratories of the Department of Computing & Information Systems are primarily intended to facilitate the conduct of practical components in computing and information systems, they provide facilities for those undertaking project work and offering other major subjects.

== Faculty of Livestock, Fisheries & Nutrition ==
The Faculty of Livestock, Fisheries & Nutrition (FLFN) has four departments:

- Department of Food Science & Technology
- Department of Applied Nutrition
- Department of Livestock & Avian Sciences
- Department of Aquaculture & Fisheries

The Faculty has been offering a BSc in Food Science & Nutrition degree since 2001. This degree programme in the combined disciplines is the first of its kind in the Sri Lankan university system.

Faculty offers a BSc in Food Production & Technology Management from the academic year 2008–2009. Both degree programmes are offered in English medium with a four-year duration. The annual enrolment for the BSc Food Science & Nutrition degree programme is 100 students, whereas for the BSc Food Production & Technology Management, 50 students.

Two degree programmes of the faculty have been designed to train graduates to meet the national needs for higher education in the relevant sectors.

== Faculty of Business Studies and Finance ==
- Department of Accountancy
- Department of Business Management
- Department of Banking and Finance
- Department of Insurance and Valuation
- Department of English Language Teaching

== Faculty of Technology ==
- Department of Construction Technology
- Department of Electrotechnology
- Department of Mechanical and Manufacturing Technology
- Department of Nano Science Technology

== Student life ==
The Computer Unit and the English Language Teaching Unit, which come under the purview of the vice-chancellor, operate through a director or a coordinator, and offer service courses to the undergraduates of both faculties at Kuliyapitiya to further their IT, oral and written communication skills.

An academic year consists of two semesters of 15 weeks each. Academic programs are based on a course credit system, which embodies characteristics such as modularity, flexibility, and accumulation of credits. After a semester, a two-week study leave is given before the semester-end examinations are conducted in a three-week period. However, examinations of practical components, project work, in-plant training programs, etc. may be held before the semester-end examination period as decided by the department.

== Notable faculty ==
- Sevvandi Jayakody - marine biologist.
