= South Eastern University of Sri Lanka =

University in Sri Lanka

- ශ්‍රී ලංකා අග්නිදිග විශ්වවිද්‍යාලය தென்கிழக்குப் பல்கலைக்கழகம், இலங்கை
- Former name: South Eastern University College of Sri Lanka
- Motto: Job seekers made job providers
- Type: Public research university
- Established: 1995; 31 years ago
- Affiliations: University Grants Commission (Sri Lanka), Association of Commonwealth Universities, International Association of Universities
- Budget: Rs. 277 million (2010)
- Chancellor: Achi. M. Ishaq
- Vice-Chancellor: A.Rameez Vice-Chancellor
- Academic staff: 102 (2010)
- Administrative staff: 236 (2010)
- Location: Oluvil, Eastern Province, Sri Lanka; 7°18′03.50″N 81°51′19.10″E
- Campus: Multiple campuses
- Website: seu.ac.lk

The South Eastern University of Sri Lanka (Sinhala: ශ්‍රී ලංකා අග්නිදිග විශ්වවිද්‍යාලය, Tamil: தென்கிழக்குப் பல்கலைக்கழகம், இலங்கை) (abbreviated SEUSL) is a public university in Oluvil in Sri Lanka. Established in 1995 as a university college, it became a full-fledged university in 1996.

The campus is in Oluvil near Oluvil Harbour. It also has faculty in Sammanthurai. The university currently has six faculties (Applied Sciences, Arts & Culture, Islamic Studies & Arabic Language, Management & Commerce, Engineering and Technology). SEUSL offers undergraduate and postgraduate courses that award degrees such as BA, BBA, BSc. in MIT ,BCom, BSc and MBA.

The university had 2,237 students and 338 employees in 2010. It is the thirteenth largest university in Sri Lanka in student numbers. In 2009/10 the university admitted 836 undergraduates. SEUSL had a recurrent budget of Rs. 277 million and a capital budget of Rs. 121 million in 2010. Its income in 2010 was Rs. 397 million of which 99% was grant from the government in Colombo.

The chancellor and vice-chancellor of the university are professor Achi. M. Ishaq and Prof. Prof. Aboobucker Rameez. SEUSL is a member of the Association of Commonwealth Universities.

== History ==
With the rising of militancy and civil strife due to Civil War in Northern province, the Muslims in Jaffna were forced to leave the peninsula as the ethnic cleansing carried out by the Tamil militant organisation Liberation Tigers of Tamil Eelam (LTTE) since the beginning of the 1990s. That action made the difficulties on Muslim staff and students who were working and studying in the University of Jaffna at that time period. As a solution, ad hoc arrangements were made for them mainly at the Eastern University in Vantharumulai in Batticaloa District. But with several subversive incidents took place between the Tamil and Muslim communities in that region, the Muslim staff and students were again compelled to leave the Eastern University too. The problem was considered by then government, which had already planned to expand its university education in the country to less developed regions.

=== Establishment of the university college ===
As an immediate relief, under the provisions of section 24A of the university act No. 16 of 1978 as amended by Act No. 07 of 1985, the South Eastern University College was established for the displaced students and academic staff from the Eastern University by an order through gazette no. 88/9 published on 26 July 1995. The new college started functioning in October 1995 at the Government Teachers' Training College premises in Addalachchenai near Akkaraipattu. The first batch of students were transferees from the Eastern University.

=== Full-fledged university ===
Gazette no. 916/7 was issued on 27 March 1996 promoting the college to a full-fledged university, the South Eastern University of Sri Lanka, with effect from 15 May 1996. The university initially had two faculties (Arts & Culture and Management & Commerce), based at Addalachchenai. The Faculty of Applied Sciences was established in 1997 with its base in Sammanthurai near Kalmunai. In May 1998 the Faculty of Arts & Culture, Faculty Management & Commerce, main library and all administrative offices moved from Addalachchenai to the newly constructed university park in Oluvil. The Faculty of Islamic Studies & Arabic Language was established in October 2005.

== Organisation and administration ==
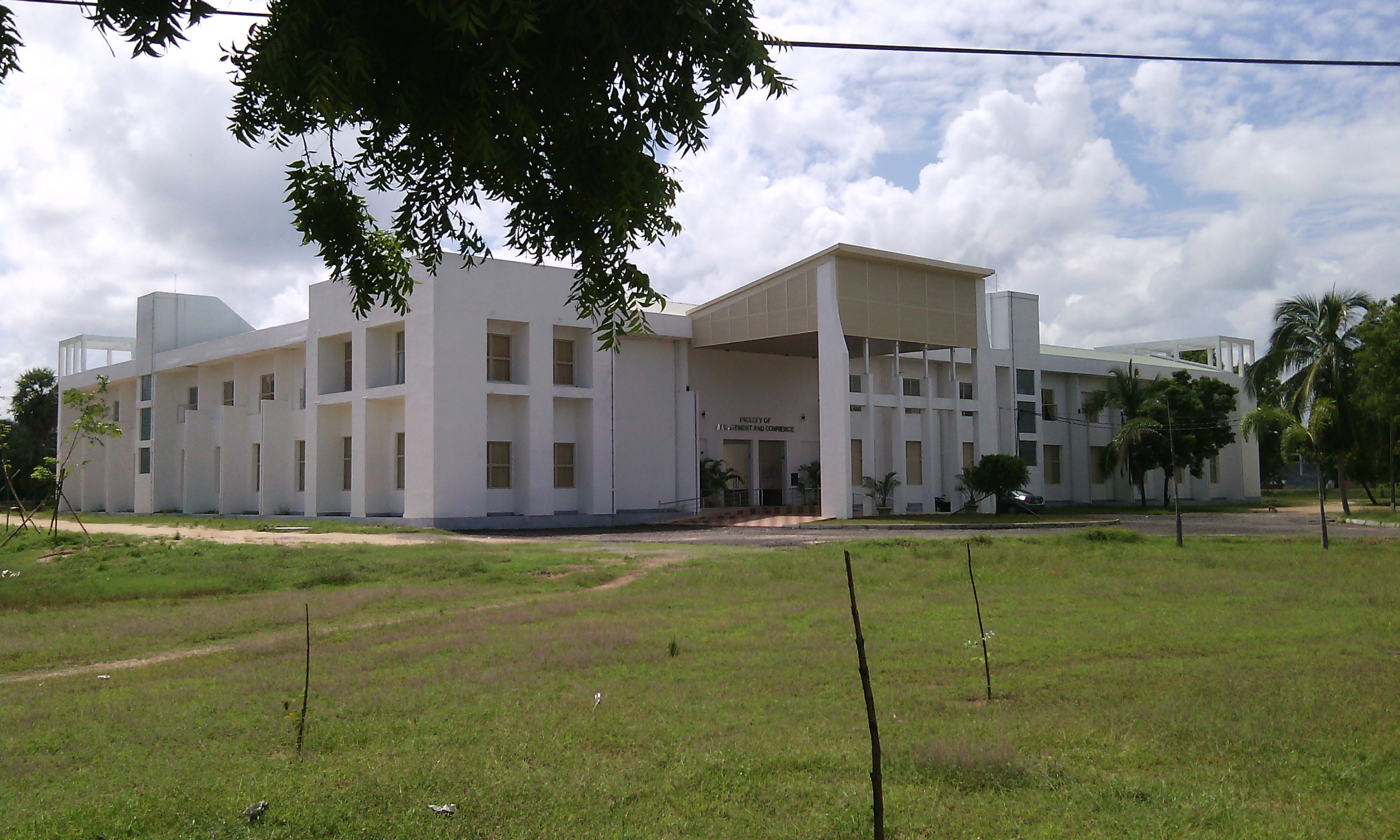
Faculty of Management & Commerce

The chancellor is professor Achi. M. Ishaq. The vice-chancellor is Prof. A. Rameez. Senior non-academic staff include registrar H. Abdul Saththar, acting bursar Mr. C.M. Wanniarachchi and librarian M. M. Rifaudeen.

The university has six faculties and a number of other departments/units:

Faculties

- Faculty of Applied Sciences
- Faculty of Arts & Culture
- Faculty of Islamic Studies & Arabic Language
- Faculty of Management & Commerce
- Faculty of Engineering
- Faculty of Technology

Other departments/units

- Arts Theatre & Auditorium
- Cafeteria
- Career Guidance Unit
- Centre for Gender Studies
- Cultural Museum
- E-learning Centre
- English Language Teaching Unit
- I.T. Centre
- Library
- Maintenance Department
- Media Unit
- Physical Education Unit
- Quality Assurance Unit
- Research & Planning Unit
- Students' Counselling Unit
- Technology and Innovation Support Center
- University Business Linkage Cell
- University Residential Complex

=== Faculty of Applied Sciences ===
The Faculty of Applied Science is divided into five departments: Biological Sciences, Mathematical Sciences, Chemical Sciences, Physical Sciences and Computer Science. The dean is Dr. UL. Zainudeen.

=== Faculty of Arts and Culture ===
The Faculty of Arts & Culture is divided into eight departments: Languages, Social Sciences, Geography, Sociology, Economic and Statistics, Political Science, English Language Teaching and Information Technology . The dean is Prof. M.M. Fazil .

=== Faculty of Islamic Studies and Arabic Language ===
The Faculty of Islamic Studies & Arabic Language is divided into two departments: Arabic Language and Islamic Studies. The dean is As Sheikh MM MUNAS .

=== Faculty of Management and Commerce ===
The Faculty of Management & Commerce is divided into Four departments: Accountancy & Finance, Management, Management and Information Technology and Marketing Management. The dean is Prof. A. M. M. Mustafa .

=== Faculty of Engineering ===
The Faculty of Engineering is divided into five departments: Civil Engineerinɡ, Mechanical Engineering, Electrical & Telecommunication Engineering, Computer Science & Engineering and Inter Disciplinary Studies. The dean is Dr.M.Haleem.

=== Faculty of Technology ===
Faculty of Technology is divided two departments: Bio systems & Technology and Information & Communication Technology. The Dean is Dr. U.L. Abdul Majeed.
