= Sabaragamuwa University of Sri Lanka =

University in Sri Lanka

- ශ්‍රී ලංකා සබරගමුව විශ්වවිද්‍යාලය இலங்கை சபரகமுவ பல்கலைக்கழகம்
- Former name: Sabaragamuwa University College
- Motto: නත්‍ථි පඤ‍්ඤා සමා ආභා (Naththi Pagnna Sama Aabha) (Pali)
- Established: 1991; 35 years ago 7 November 1995; 31 years ago Gained University Status
- Accreditation: University Grants Commission (Sri Lanka)
- Academic affiliations: University Grants Commission of Sri Lanka, Association of Commonwealth Universities
- Chancellor: Senior Professor Gallelle Sumanasiri Thero
- Vice-Chancellor: Emeritus Prof. S.A. Ariadurai
- Administrative staff: 1600
- Undergraduates: 14,250
- Postgraduates: 1500
- Location: Balangoda, Sri Lanka; 6°42′52″N 80°47′18″E
- Campus: Suburban
- Language: Sinhala, Tamil and English
- Colours: Maroon, gold
- Sporting affiliations: Sri Lanka University Games
- Website: www.sab.ac.lk

The Sabaragamuwa University of Sri Lanka (Sinhala: ශ්‍රී ලංකා සබරගමුව විශ්වවිද්‍යාලය, Tamil: இலங்கை சபரகமுவ பல்கலைக்கழகம்) is a public university in Belihuloya, Balangoda, Sri Lanka. It was founded on 20 November 1991 and consists of Nine faculties.

== History ==
=== Palabaddala Monastic University ===
Historical records provide evidence of the existence of a monastic university at Palabaddala, in the Ratnapura District of the Sabaragamuwa Province. This ancient institution of higher learning was established during the Dambadeniya period by King Parakramabahu II (1235–1271 AD), who was known as Kalikala Sahitya Sarvagna Pandita. Bhikkhu Dharmakirti served as the Chancellor of the said university. Meanwhile, the monastic institution of higher education in Sabaragamuwa was under the custody of Deva Pathiraja, the royal agent of King Parakramabahu II.

=== Historical Highlights ===
During the early 1990s, the Government of Sri Lanka introduced the concept of “Affiliated University Colleges” in response to various social issues affecting the younger generation, particularly youth unrest. Several committee reports submitted to the Government highlighted the need to address these challenges by creating new educational opportunities for young people. Accordingly, the Government decided to establish diploma-awarding institutions affiliated with national universities.

The Sabaragamuwa Affiliated University College (SAUC) was one such institution, established in affiliation with the University of Sri Jayewardenepura. Located in Belihuloya, in the Sabaragamuwa Province, the SAUC was established on 20.11.1991 under the Sabaragamuwa Province Affiliated University College Ordinance No. 14 of 1991. The institution was ceremonially declared open by His Excellency R. Premadasa, the then President of Democratic Socialist Republic of Sri Lanka, on 08.02.1992. Subsequently, academic programmes at the SAUC commenced on 07.05.1992.

Prof. J.W. Dayananda Somasundara, the founding Director of the Sabaragamuwa Affiliated University College (SAUC), was committed to transforming the institution into a national university. Inspired by his vision and leadership, the academic, administrative and non-academic staff, students, and neighbouring communities actively contributed to the development and advancement of the SAUC towards achieving this goal.

As a result of these collective efforts, the Government of Sri Lanka decided to elevate the Sabaragamuwa Affiliated University College (SAUC) to the status of a national university by amalgamating it with the Rahangala Affiliated University College (RAUC) and the Buttala Affiliated University College (BAUC), both located in Uva Province. Following the amalgamation, the RAUC and the BAUC were incorporated as the Faculties of Agricultural Sciences and Applied Sciences, respectively.

Prior to the amalgamation, the SAUC at Belihuloya and the BAUC at Buttala were affiliated with the University of Sri Jayewardenepura, while the RAUC at Rahangala was affiliated with both the University of Peradeniya and the University of Sri Jayewardenepura. The respective Directors of the RAUC and the BAUC were the Rev. Elle Wimalananda Thero and Professor Arthur Bamunuarachchi.

Establishment of Sabaragamuwa University of Sri Lanka

The Sabaragamuwa University of Sri Lanka was established on 07.11.1995 under Section 21 of the Universities Act, No. 16 of 1978, by Government Gazette Extraordinary No. 896/2 dated 07.11.1995, becoming the 12^{th} national university in Sri Lanka. The establishment of the University resulted from the amalgamation of the resources of three Affiliated University Colleges located at Belihuloya, Rahangala and Buttala.

Subsequently, the establishment of the Uva Campus, attached to the Sabaragamuwa University of Sri Lanka, was announced by an Extraordinary Gazette dated 21.12.1995. Under the arrangements made at the time, the newly established Sabaragamuwa University of Sri Lanka operated at Belihuloya, while the Uva Campus functioned at Rahangala and Buttala

The University was officially declared open on 02.02.1996 by Ms. Sirimavo R.D. Bandaranaike, the then Prime Minister of Sri Lanka.

At its inception, the University comprised four Faculties: the Faculty of Social Sciences and Languages and the Faculty of Business Studies, both located at Belihuloya; the Faculty of Agricultural Sciences at Rahangala; and the Faculty of Applied Sciences at Buttala. Subsequently, the Faculty of Business Studies was renamed the Faculty of Management Studies with effect from 13.01.2004, in accordance with Government Gazette Extraordinary No. 1323/14 dated 13.01.2004.

Initially, the Faculty of Agricultural Sciences was located at Rahangala, where it continued to function under challenging conditions until 2001. The considerable distance between Rahangala and the University's main premises at Belihuloya created difficulties for both academic staff and students. Following repeated requests from the faculty community for relocation, the University administration moved the Faculty of Agricultural Sciences to Belihuloya in 2001.

Similarly, the Faculty of Applied Sciences, which initially operated at Buttala, was relocated to the University's main premises at Belihuloya in 2008 to address similar operational and administrative challenges. These relocations brought both Faculties together with the University's main academic community at Belihuloya.

The academic structure of the University was further expanded in 2004 with the establishment of the Faculty of Geomatics as the fifth Faculty. To facilitate the development, coordination and administration of postgraduate programmes, the Faculty of Graduate Studies was subsequently established as the sixth Faculty in 2017.

The University continued to broaden its academic portfolio by establishing new Faculties to address the evolving demands of higher education. The Faculty of Technology was established as the seventh Faculty in 2018, followed by the Faculty of Medicine as the eighth Faculty in the same year. The Faculty of Medicine is located in Ratnapura, separately from the University's main premises at Belihuloya. The latest addition to the University's academic structure was the Faculty of Computing, established as the ninth Faculty in 2022.

Through these developments, the Sabaragamuwa University of Sri Lanka has evolved from an institution comprising four Faculties at its inception into a university with nine Faculties. This expansion reflects the University's continuing commitment to broadening access to higher education, diversifying its academic programmes, and strengthening its contribution to teaching, research and national development.

Throughout the history of the Sabaragamuwa University of Sri Lanka, several Vice-Chancellors have provided leadership and contributed significantly to the advancement of the University's academic standards, institutional development and higher education. They include Professor J.W. Dayananda Somasundara, Professor I.K. Perera, Professor Rohana P. Mahaliyanaarachchi, Professor Mahinda S. Rupasinghe, Professor Chandana P. Udawatte, Professor M. Sunil Shantha and Professor R.M.U.S.K. Rathnayaka. In addition, Professor S.A. Ariadurai, a retired Professor of the Open University of Sri Lanka, has served as the Acting Vice-Chancellor of the University.

== Campus ==
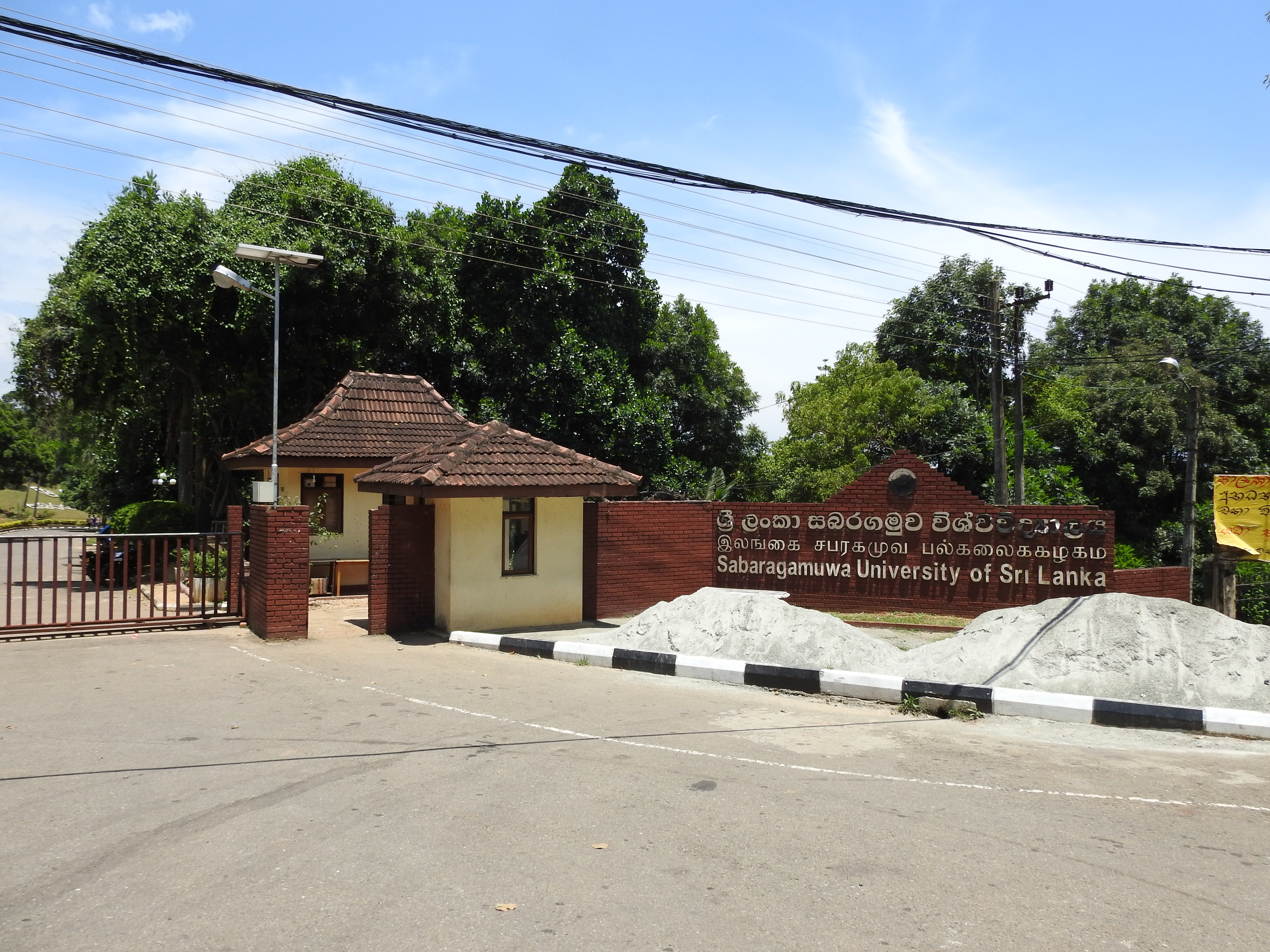
Entrance of the university.

The SUSL is in the former Japanese expatriate village of the Samanalawewa project. Hence, from the inception of SUSL, some of the Samanalawewa project buildings became available. After expansion and renovation, this village became the hub of the university.

Upon the invitation of Prof. Mahinda S. Rupasinghe, the vice-chancellor of SUSL, the new building of the Faculty of Applied Sciences and the second stage of the faculty building of the Faculty of Social Sciences and Languages were ceremoniously declared opened by His Excellency Mahinda Rajapakshe, president of Sri Lanka on 31 March 2012. Also present were the Hon. S. B. Dissanayake, Minister of Higher Education, Hon. Nandimiththra Ekanayake, deputy minister of Higher Education and other honoured guests.

Meanwhile, the construction of the new buildings complex for the Faculty of Geomatics and the playground and pavilion was completed as well. The Faculty of Agricultural Sciences had several new buildings, which were deemed adequate for its present requirements. In the future, a separate new building will be constructed for the Faculty of Agricultural Sciences to hold its growing student population. These infrastructural changes reflect steps taken towards the progress of the university.

== Location ==
SUSL is in the southern foothills of the central mountain range about 162 km from Colombo, on the Colombo–Badulla (A4) road. Administratively, SUSL belongs to the Imbulpe Divisional Secretariat and to the Ratnapura District in Sabaragamuwa Province. The university is 500 m from the Pambahinna Junction, on the A4 highway which runs through Belihuloya. The closest city to the university is Balangoda (18 km), the closest railway station is Haputale (31 km), while Bandarawela is the only 40 km from the university.

== Organization ==
The SUSL was established on 7 November 1995 by the Gazette Notification No. 896/2 and operates under the provisions of the Universities Act No. 16 of 1978 and the Universities (Amendment) Act No. 7 of 1985. SUSL was ceremonially declared open on 2 February 1996 by Her Excellency Chandrika Bandaranaike Kumaratunga, the president of Sri Lanka. The organizational structure represents a number of chief administrative positions such as chancellor, vice-chancellor, deans and many others, who plan for future development. They implement and monitor decisions taken by the overall management.

== Chancellors ==
- Most Venerable Agga Maha Pandita Rev. Balangoda Ananda Maithriya Mahanayaka Thero
- Dr. C. R. Panabokka
- Venerable Madithiyawela Wijithasena Thero
- Venerable Professor Kumburugamuwe Vajira Thero
- Venerable Snr. Prof. Gallelle Sumanasiri Thero (Present)

The chancellor of the SUSL is the ceremonial head of the university and presides over the University Convocation. The chancellor is nominated by the president of Sri Lanka for five years.

== Vice-chancellors ==
- Prof. Dayananda Somasundara, 1995–2001
- Prof. I.K. Perera, 2001–2004
- Prof. Rohana P Mahaliyanaarachchi: 2005–2008
- Prof. Mahinda S Rupasinghe: 2008–2014
- Prof. Chandana P. Udawatte: 2014–2017
- Prof. M. Sunil Shantha: 2017-2020
- Prof. R.M.U.S.K. Rathnayake 2020 - 2023
- Prof. M. Sunil Shantha: 2023 - 2026
- Prof. S.A. Ariyadurai (Acting): from 2026 May

The president of Sri Lanka appoints the vice-chancellor out of three nominations made by the University Council for three years. The vice-chancellor is the principal Executive, Academic Officer, and Chief Accounting Officer of the university. The vice-chancellor is also the chairman and ex-officio member of the Council and the Senate of the University and is responsible for the maintenance of discipline and academic work.

== Faculties ==
=== Faculty of Computing ===
Department of Software Engineering

The Department of Software Engineering (DSE) at the Faculty of Computing, Sabaragamuwa University of Sri Lanka was established in 2022 by introducing the BSc Hons Degree Programme in Software Engineering for the academic year 2019/2020.

=== Faculty of Graduate Studies ===
- Department of Physiology
- Department of Medicine
- Forensic Medicine & Toxicology
- Department of Community Medicine
- Department of Microbiology
- Department of Obstetrics & Gynaecology
- Department of Paediatrics
- Department of Parasitology
- Department of Pathology
- Department of Pharmacology
- Department of Primary Care & Family Medicine
- Department of Psychiatry
- Department of Surgery

== Development ==
The university was awarded some 155.5 million rupees in 2004/5 for improving the relevance and quality of undergraduates in higher education. This money is in addition to the annual government funds received.

== Controversy ==
A second-year student from the university's faculty of technology in Sabaragamuwa university has been found dead. He killed himself after he was stripped and tortured by seniors, family members reported to Sri Lankan security authorities . ,
