= University Grants Commission (Sri Lanka) =

Sri Lankan statutory board

- Abbreviation: UGC
- Formation: 22 December 1979
- Purpose: Planning and co-ordination of university education, allocation of funds to Higher Educational Institutions (HEIs), maintenance of academic standards, regulation of the administration of HEIs and regulation of admission of students to HEIs.
- Headquarters: Colombo
- Location: Sri Lanka
- Official language: Sinhala, Tamil, English
- Chairman: Senior Professor Kapila Seneviratne
- Main organ: Commission Members
- Affiliations: Government of Sri Lanka
- Staff: Over 200
- Website: ugc.ac.lk

University Grants Commission is the body responsible for funding the State Universities in Sri Lanka, and operates within the frame work of the Universities Act No. 16 of 1978. A public organisation, established under the Parliament Act No 16 of 1978. Location is at No 20, Ward Place Colombo 07.

It distributes public money, allocated by the Government for teaching and research to universities and university affiliated institutes, as such controls much influence and appointments at state universities.

== Functions ==
The official functions of the UGC are;

- Allocation of funds to Higher Educational Institutions (HEIs) that come under it
- Planning and co-ordination of university education
- Maintenance of academic standards
- Regulation of the administration of HEIs
- Regulation of student admissions to HEIs

== The Commission members ==
The Universities Act provides for seven members of the Commission appointed by the President. These are:

- Senior Prof. Kapila Seneviratne – Chairman
- Senior Prof. K.L. Wasantha Kumara – Vice Chairman
- Senior Prof. Rahula Athalage – Commission Member
- Senior Prof. O.G. Dayaratne – Commission Member
- Senior Prof. Subramaniam Raviraj – Commission Member
- Mr. C.K.W. Unamboowa PC – Commission Member

== Universities and Higher Educational Institutions under the UGC ==
=== Universities ===
- University of Colombo
- University of Peradeniya
- University of Sri Jayewardenepura
- University of Kelaniya
- University of Moratuwa
- University of Jaffna
- University of Ruhuna
- University of Vavuniya
- University of the Visual & Performing Arts
- Open University, Sri Lanka
- Eastern University, Sri Lanka
- South Eastern University of Sri Lanka
- Rajarata University of Sri Lanka
- Sabaragamuwa University of Sri Lanka
- Wayamba University of Sri Lanka
- Uva Wellassa University
- Gampaha Wickramarachchi University of Indigenous Medicine

=== Campuses ===
- Sri Palee Campus
- Trincomalee Campus

=== Institutes ===
- Postgraduate Institute of Medicine, Colombo
- Postgraduate Institute of Agriculture, Peradeniya
- Postgraduate Institute of Pali & Buddhist Studies
- Postgraduate Institute of Archaeology
- Postgraduate Institute of Management
- Postgraduate Institute of Science, Peradeniya
- Postgraduate Institute of English
- Postgraduate Institute of Humanities and Social Sciences
- Postgraduate Institute of Indigenous Medicine
- Postgraduate Institute of Medical Sciences
- Institute of Human Resource Advancement
- University of Colombo School of Computing
- National Institute of Library and Information Sciences
- Institute of Technology University of Moratuwa
- Institute of Biochemistry, Molecular Biology and Biotechnology (IBMBB)
- The National Centre for Advanced Studies in Humanities & Social Sciences
- Swamy Vipulananda Institute of Aesthetic Studies
- Institute for Agro-Technology and Rural Sciences

== See also ==
- Universities in Sri Lanka
