= International Association of Universities =

Nongovernmental organization

- Formation: 1950; 76 years ago
- Type: NGO
- Headquarters: Paris, France
- Region served: Worldwide
- Members: More than 600 members- Universities, higher education institutions & associations
- Official language: French, English
- President: Andrew J Deeks
- Executive General Secretary: Hilligje van't Land
- Main organ: IAU General Assembly
- Affiliations: UNESCO
- Website: IAU Official website

The International Association of Universities (IAU) is a membership-led non-governmental organization working in the field of global higher education. It has more than 600 members in over 130 countries, including institutions, organizations, affiliates, and associates in higher education. The IAU was created under and is an official associate partner of the United Nations Educational Scientific and Cultural Organization (UNESCO).

== Mission ==
Following the IAU's 15th General Conference, the IAU proclaims four priorities to advance the mission of development in higher education. These include leadership, sustainable development, internationalization, and digital transformation.

== History ==
As a result of the aftermath of World War II and the emergence of the Cold War, there was a renewed need for global cooperation. Cooperation within global higher education became a driving issue to rebuild and strengthen the world. Thus, a formal proposition of the International Association of Universities was discussed at a UNESCO General Conference in the year 1947. Three years after, the IAU held its first General Conference in Nice, France. Over the decades, the IAU has played a key role in promoting global collaboration among universities, addressing issues in higher education, and advancing sustainable development. Following the first General Conference, key events included releasing two publications that formalized the standards and goals for the organization as well as the creation of international research committees in the 1960s.

Throughout the 1970s and 1980s, IAU expanded its vision by addressing and discussing arising problems, increasing partnerships, and releasing more publications. In the 1990s, the IAU recognized the importance of releasing policy statements as a form of discussion for current concerns, addressing issues like sustainable development and academic freedom.

In the 2000s, the IAU increased its focus on internationalization, launching global reports, advisory services, and global forums. It also embraced digital transformation, creating online platforms for outreach to higher education institutions. First presented in 2016 and up until today, the IAU prioritizes leadership, sustainable development, internationalization, and digital transformation.

== Governance structure ==
The IAU operates under a member representative governance system designed to foster international cooperation in higher education. The General Conference, composed of representatives from institutional members and organizational members, is the supreme decision-making body. It convenes at least once every four years, determining IAU’s general policy, electing the President and Administrative Board, and addressing themes of global relevance in higher education. This gathering also serves as a forum for fostering diversity and solidarity in global higher education. The Administrative Board, comprising the President, Secretary-General, and members from diverse nations, meets annually to implement the General Conference’s decisions, manage the budget, and oversee the Secretariat. Supporting the Administrative Board is the Executive Committee, composed of the President, four regional Vice-Presidents, and the Secretary-General. Meeting twice yearly, this committee acts on behalf of the Administrative Board, guiding the agenda and preparing its meetings. The IAU President as well as all Administrative Board positions are election based and are served in four year terms. Executive Committee positions are appointed by the President with confirmation by the Administrative Board. The Secretariat, based in UNESCO’s Paris headquarters, executes the association’s programs, manages its daily operations, and serves as a hub for information and advisory services.

== Membership ==
The IAU counts over 600 members in over 130 countries worldwide. These members span diverse geographical regions and focus on collaboration, knowledge exchange, and innovation in higher education. There are four different member classes within the IAU including institutions, organizations, affiliates, and associates. The majority of the organizations' membership is occupied by higher education institutions. There are a variety of benefits that members of the IAU utilize including networking opportunities, resources for development, and being actively involved in both organizational and global decision making. Access to benefits alters with member status. Each member category has a specific admission criteria and application process. To become a member institution of the an application must be submitted and accepted given that the institution aligns with the mission and meets a set of characteristic requirements. Becoming a member organization is open to associations and networks of higher education institutions. Affiliate membership is offered for those organizations that align with the IAUs mission but do not meet certain characteristic admission criteria. Individuals who have expertise in higher education can apply for associate membership. There is a financial requirement annually which varies depending on member class and origin country income.

== Programs and initiatives ==
In its 2023 annual report, the IAU outlines an agenda focusing on thematic priorities to address global challenges and foster development in higher education.

=== Leadership ===
The IAU prioritizes leadership that enables institutions to strategically address challenges and foster social progress. A high developed IAU program includes the year-long Executive Leadership Program, which equips current and emerging university leaders with skills to address pressing administrative, ethical, and societal issues. This program utilizes in person sessions and online learning, incorporating ten thematic modules.

=== Sustainable Development ===
The IAU offers research and collaboration to support its alignment with the United Nations 2030 Agenda's Sustainable Development Goals. The IAU's Higher Education and Research for Sustainable Development (HESD) Cluster, promotes collaboration among universities worldwide to advance specific sustainable development goals. The IAU actively engages with UNESCO and other organizations to enhance sustainability in education. The IAU leads research projects like the Global Survey on HESD and pilot programs to gather information that can be utilized in sustainable development.

=== Internationalization ===
The IAU advocates for inclusive and ethical internationalization in higher education. This is presented through a variety of methods including the 6th Global Survey on Internationalization, collecting insights from institutions across 110 countries to assess global and regional trends. Partnerships like the Future of Internationalization Partnership and Network of International Education Associations focus on understanding evolving dynamics and fostering global dialogue. Initiatives like an Online Diploma on Internationalization Management target regional and global stakeholders.

=== Digital Transformation ===
The IAU understands the progression of technology and offers a framework to utilize technology to enhance access and quality in education. Recent initiatives include developing an Open Science Expert Group which supports the adoption of UNESCO’s Open Science principles and discussions exploring the impact of unprecedented technologies like artificial intelligence. The IAU relaunched its connection-based program, the Institutional Site Visits Program, which fosters peer learning around innovative digital practices.
