= Engineering education in Sri Lanka =

Engineering is the most sought after subject areas among Sri Lankan students. The engineering degrees make up less than 2% of the bachelor's degrees in Sri Lanka.

== Registration ==
The title of "engineer" is not regulated in Sri Lanka. However, as per the Engineering Council Act No 4 of 2017, all engineering practitioners in Sri Lanka needs to be registered with the engineering council to practice. Failing to do so would result in an offence and can be convicted by a summary trial before a Magistrate with imprisonment period not exceeding one year and/or a fine not exceeding one hundred thousand.

=== Categories of registered engineers ===
Registering engineering practitioners under the categories of;

- Chartered Engineer (CEng) - Chartered Engineer of the Institution of Engineers, Sri Lanka (IESL)
- Associate Engineer (AEng) - Four year Full-time degree in Engineering recognized by IESL or an Associate Member of IESL
- Affiliate Engineer (AflEng) - Three year full-time degree in Engineering recognized by IESL
- Incorporated Engineer (IEng) - Incorporated Engineer of the Institution of Incorporated Engineers, Sri Lanka (IIESL)
- Engineering Diplomate (EngDip) - Diploma in Engineering from a recognized University or Technical or Technological Institute recognized by IIESL
- Engineering Technician (EngTec) - National Vocational Qualification Level IV of Engineering Technology or equivalent qualification recognized by the Tertiary and Vocational Education Commission or one year full-time academic course in Engineering Technology and has gained one year industrial experience in the relevant field or a holder of a Diploma or Certificate in Technology by a University or a Technical or Technological Institute of the Government of Sri Lanka

== Engineering Degrees ==
=== Public Universities ===
- Faculty of Engineering, University of Peradeniya
- Faculty of Engineering, University of Moratuwa
- Faculty of Engineering Technology, Open University of Sri Lanka
- Faculty of Engineering, University of Ruhuna
- Faculty of Engineering, General Sir John Kotelawala Defence University
- Faculty of Engineering, University of Jaffna
- Faculty of Engineering Technology, University of Vocational Technology
- Faculty of Engineering, South Eastern University of Sri Lanka
- Faculty of Engineering, University of Sri Jayewardenepura

=== Autonomous Institutes ===
- Faculty of Engineering, Colombo International Nautical and Engineering College
- Faculty of Engineering, SLTC-Research University
- Faculty of Engineering, Sri Lanka Institute of Information Technology

Faculty of Engineering, NSBM-Green University

== Engineering Diplomas ==
- Institute of Engineering Technology, National Diploma in Engineering Sciences
- Technical Colleges in Sri Lanka
  - Maradana College of Technology
  - Technical College Balapitiya
- Institute of Technology, University of Moratuwa
- Ceylon-German Technical Training Institute
- Institute of Higher National Diploma in Engineering
- Sri Lanka Institute of Advanced Technological Education
  - Hardy Advanced Technological Institute

== See also ==
- Engineering education
- Education in Sri Lanka
- Post-secondary qualifications in Sri Lanka
