= Gal Oya Scheme =

Sri Lankan government scheme

- Country: Sri Lanka
- Location: Eastern Province
- Purpose: Irrigation, agriculture, resettlement
- Status: Operational
- Construction began: 1949
- Opening date: 1953
- Operator: Gal Oya Development Board (defunct)

Gal Oya Scheme is a multipurpose irrigation and agricultural development project initiated by the Government of Ceylon in 1949. At its time, it was the largest post-independence development project undertaken in Sri Lanka as part of the Dry Zone Settlements in Sri Lanka. The project built the Inginiyagala Dam, creating the Senanayake Samudraya reservoir and the Gal Oya National Park.

Following independence in 1948, the Ceylonese state prioritized increasing its agricultural output to achieve food security and economic self-reliance. The Gal Oya River was targeted for a large-scale irrigation project aimed at cultivating over 63,000 hectares. The Gal Oya Development Board was formed in 1949 as a semi-autonomous public body set up by Parliament to manage the planning, construction, irrigation works, and settlement processes. At its formation the board consisted of R. L. Brohier (first Chairperson), Harold James Huxham, R. Kanagasuntheram (second Chairperson), W. T. I. Alagaratnam, T. C. S. Jeyaratam, D Caspersz and A R Mansoor. Construction was contracted to Morrison–Knudsen.

== See also ==
- Dry Zone Settlements in Sri Lanka
- Mahaweli Development programme
- Hardy Advanced Technological Institute
