= List of post-nominal letters (Sri Lanka) =

Post-nominal letters in Sri Lanka include:

Office	Post-nominal
Military Awards and Decorations
Bravery Awards
Parama Weera Vibhushanaya	PWV
Weerodara Vibhushanaya	WV
Weera Wickrama Vibhushanaya	WWV
Rana Wickrama Padakkama	RWP
Rana Sura Padakkama	RSP
Distinguished & Long Service Awards
Vishista Seva Vibhushanaya	VSV
Uttama Seva Padakkama	USP
Videsha Seva Padakkama	VSP
Karyakshama Seva Vibhushanaya	KSV
Prashansaniya Seva Vibhushanaya	PSV
Appointments by the President
President's Counsel	PC
Court Appointments
Justice of the Peace and Unofficial Magistrate	JP, UM
Justice of the Peace	JP
Legislators
Member of Parliament of Sri Lanka	MP
University Degrees
Doctorate	PhD, etc.
Master's Degree	MA, MSc, MISM, MCS, MDS, etc.
Bachelor's Degree	BA, BSc, etc.
University diplomas
Postgraduate diploma	PgDip
Postgraduate certificate	PgCert
Diplomas
National Diplomas	NDT, HNDA, etc.
Diploma	Dip
University alumni
University of Ceylon	(Cey.)
University of Colombo	(Col.)
University of Peradeniya	(Pera.)
Qualifications
Chartered Chemist	CChem
Chartered Engineer	CEng (Sri Lanka)
Incorporated Engineer	IEng
Learned society
Association of Accounting Technicians of Sri Lanka	FMAAT, MAAT, SAT
Computer Society of Sri Lanka	MCS(SL)
College of Community Physicians of Sri Lanka	FCCPSL
Institute of Certified Management Accountants of Sri Lanka	FCMA, ACMA
Institute of Chartered Professional Managers of Sri Lanka	FCPM, MCPM, ACPM
Institute of Chartered Accountants of Sri Lanka	FCA, ACA
Institute of Chemistry, Ceylon	FIChemC, MIChemC, AMIChemC, LIChemC
Institution of Engineers, Sri Lanka	FIESL, MIESL, AMIESL, AffIESL
Institution of Incorporated Engineers, Sri Lanka	FIIESL, MIIESL, AMIIESL, AffIESL
Institute of Management of Sri Lanka	FIM(SL), MIM(SL), AMIIM(SL)
Sri Lanka Institute of Marketing	FSLIM, MSLIM, CMSLIM, AMSLIM
Armed Forces
Passed Staff College	psc
Logistics Staff Course	lsc
Sri Lanka Army	SLLI, SLAC, SLA, etc.
Sri Lanka Army Volunteer Force	SLAVF
Sri Lanka Navy	SLN
Sri Lanka Volunteer Naval Force	SLVNF
Sri Lanka Air Force	SLAF
Sri Lanka Volunteer Air Force	SLVAF
Approved retired officers	(Retd)

== See also ==
- Lists of post-nominal letters
- Orders, decorations, and medals of Sri Lanka
