= Institute of Higher National Diploma in Engineering =

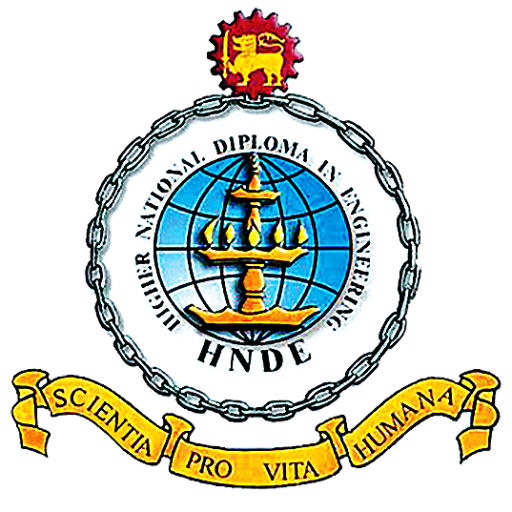
- The emblem of Institute of Higher National Diploma in Engineering
- Other name: HNDE Colombo
- Motto: Scientia Pro Vita Humana
- Motto in English: Knowledge for Human Life
- Type: Public autonomous
- Established: 1986
- Parent institution: Sri Lanka Institute of Advanced Technological Education
- Affiliations: Sri Lanka Institute of Advanced Technological Education; Institution of Incorporated Engineers, Sri Lanka; Institute of Quantity Surveyors Sri Lanka; American Society of Heating, Refrigerating and Air-Conditioning Engineers; Australian Institute of Quantity Surveyors
- Director: A.G.A Jalithe Kumara
- Students: 1500+
- Location: 42, Rodrigo Place, Colombo 15
- Campus: Urban
- Colors: Gold and Light Blue
- Website: www.hnde.lk

Institute of Higher National Diploma in Engineering (HNDE) is a public institute in Sri Lanka mainly focused on higher education. Since 1986 the Higher National Diploma in Engineering (HNDE) program has been the pioneer in producing incorporated engineers for the local and international industry.

== History ==
In 1985 the National Technical Teachers Training College (NTTTC) and Technical education unit of the Ministry of Education conducted a survey on the workforce. It was found that the ratio of chartered engineers to middle level engineers should be 1:3. However, according to the statistics it was 1:5:20. As a proposal the UK-based HNDE was introduced to Sri Lanka and which It was modified with Advanced Engineering Theoretical concept and Communication skills to suit modern-day industry and the course was extended for three and one-half years duration, including its six-month in-plant training period, with the approval of the Bolton University and funded by the ADB.

On 30 October 1990, the HNDE was gazetted as a parallel course to other Engineering diplomas in Sri Lanka. After a year, on 11 December 1991, the HNDE course which was at Rathmalana NTTTC, was affiliated to BTEC under registration number 78/981. On 17 August 1994, HNDE was transferred to the ministry of labour and vocational training from the ministry of education and higher education. However, on 1 May 1996 HNDE was connected with the Sri Lanka Institute of Advanced Technological Education, which was mainly under the ministry of education & higher education. On 12 December 1996 the institute celebrated its 10th anniversary.

In July 2004, a newly built 4-story building was opened to the public. The students were able to conduct an art festival on the theme 'Mini Sengavi Soya' with the presence of the deputy minister Ranjith Siyambalapitiya and Rathna Sri Wijesingha.

In June 2006, it celebrated the 20th anniversary, organising an exhibition, in parallel with the INCO exhibition of IIESL was held on. Minister Sarath Amunugama was the chief guest on the first day.'Himidiriya' a collection of short stories was presented to the educationalist Leelananda Gamachchi.

== Departments ==
- Civil Engineering
- Electrical & Electronics Engineering
- Mechanical Engineering
- Building Services Engineering
- Quantity Surveying

== Courses ==
1. Higher National Diploma in Civil Engineering
2. Higher National Diploma in Electrical & Electronics Engineering
3. Higher National Diploma in Mechanical Engineering
4. Higher National Diploma in Building Services Engineering
5. Higher National Diploma in Quantity Surveying

== Head of The Departments ==
- Department of Civil Engineering - Mrs. K.V.D. Perera
- Department of Mechanical Engineering - Mrs. A.H.F. Sattar
- Department of Electrical & Electronics Engineering - Mr. R.W.R. Jayasinghe

== Career Progression ==
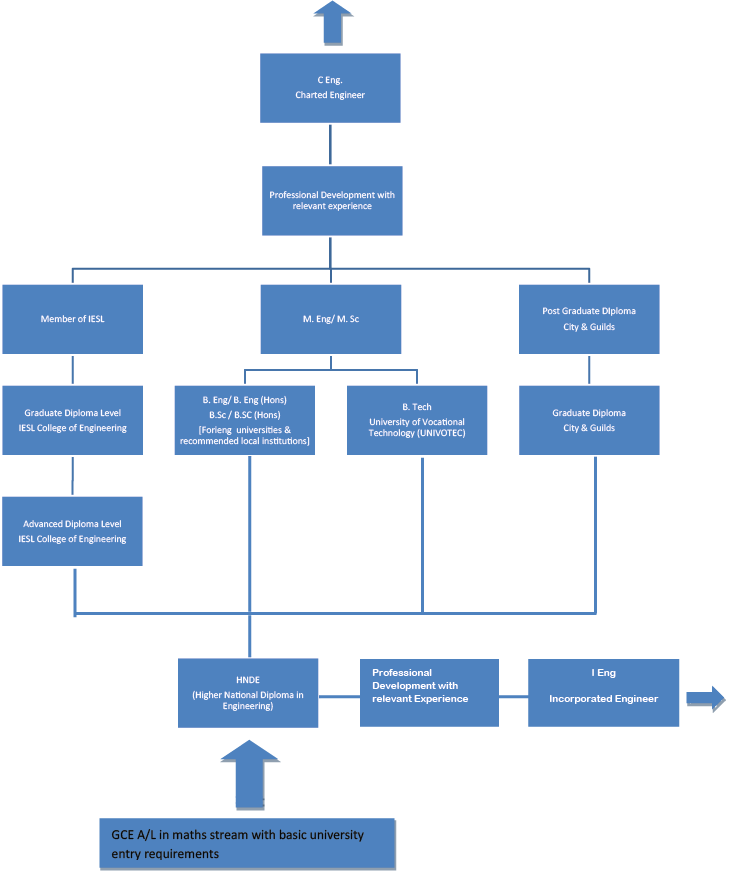

== See also ==
- Education in Sri Lanka
- Sri Lankan universities
- Advanced Technological Institute, Sri Lanka
