= R. L. Brohier =

Richard Leslie Brohier
- Born: 10 May 1892; Colombo Fort
- Died: 14 February 1980 (aged 87); Colombo
- Education: Royal College, Colombo, Ceylon Technical College
- Occupations: Surveyor, author
- Children: Deloraine

Richard Leslie Brohier, OBE, FRAS, FRGS (5 October 1892 – 14 February 1980) was a Ceylonese Burgher surveyor and writer. He served as Deputy Surveyor General of Ceylon and Chairman of the Gal Oya Development Board.

== Education and career ==
Brohier was born in Colombo Fort on 5 October 1892. He received his education at the Colombo Academy and at the Ceylon Technical College, where he studied surveying, having entered in 1909. In 1910, he joined the Survey Department as a supernumerary surveyor and was the first Ceylonese surveyor in the department. He passed the senior departmental professional examination in 1921, and was appointed to the grade of Assistant Superintendent of Surveys and headed the surveyor party in the North Central Province. In 1933, he was promoted to the grade of Superintendent of Surveys. Between 1938 and 1946 he served in the capacity of Acting Assistant Surveyor General and was confirmed as Assistant Surveyor General, later serving as Deputy Surveyor General. He was the first Ceylonese to serve in these capacities. In 1946, he served as the Secretary to the first Delimitation Commission, appointed under the Ceylon (Constitution) Order in Council. He took early retirement while serving as Deputy Surveyor General on request of Prime Minister D. S. Senanayake to become a member of the Gal Oya Development Board, later serving as its chairman.

== Honors and appointments ==
Brohier was elected a Fellow of the Royal Geographical Society in 1931 and of the Institute of Chartered Surveyors in 1947. He was appointed an Officer of the Order of the British Empire in the 1947 Birthday Honours for his service as Assistant Surveyor General. He was awarded an honorary doctorate DLitt (Honoris Causa) from the University of Ceylon in 1963 and was presented the Gold Medal of the Royal Asiatic Society in 1971. In 1978, he was appointed an Officer of the Order of Oranje Nassau by Queen Juliana of the Netherlands.

He served as president of the Engineering Association of Ceylon; President of the Ceylon Geographical Association; President of the Ceylon Survey Institute, and President of the Dutch Burgher Union of Ceylon. He was elected as a Fellow of the Royal Asiatic Society and an honorary member of the Netherlands Alumni Association.

== Author ==
He authored several books, including:

=== Bibliography ===
- The Golden Age of Military Adventure in Ceylon in 1933.
- The Ancient Irrigation Works of Ceylon in three parts (1934/35), which was reprinted in 1949 and 1979.
- De Wolvendaalsche Kerk in 1938 and reprinted in 1938 and 1957.
- History of Irrigation and Colonisation in Ceylon in 1941.
- Lands Maps and Surveys Vol I and Vol II in 1951.
- The Gal Oya Valley Project in Ceylon in 1951.
- Seeing Ceylon in 1965 reprinted in 1971 and reprinted in 1981.
- Furniture in Dutch Ceylon in 1969 and reprinted in 1978.
- Discovering Ceylon in 1973 and reprinted in 1982.
- Food and the People in 1975
- Links between Sri Lanka and the Netherlands in 1978
- Changing Face of Colombo in 1984 (Posthumously)
- The Golden Plains in 1992 (Posthumously)
