= Junior University Colleges =

University in Sri Lanka

Junior University Colleges of Ceylon
- ලංකා කණිෂ්ඨ විශ්වවිද්‍යාල කොලිජිය
- Type: Public
- Active: February 2, 1969–1972
- Location: Dehiwala; Galle; Kuliyapitiya; Kegalle; Palaly; Polgolla, Ceylon

The Junior University College of Ceylon was a university college in Sri Lanka which operated from 1969 until 1972. It had several constituent campuses around Sri Lanka. In 1972, several of the campuses were separated into independent Advanced Technological Institutes .

== History ==
=== Foundation and vision ===
.... The Junior University Colleges are destined in the decades ahead to bring lasting benefits of great value to their students, to each of the cities and towns, and hence to the Nation,
Prof.Fredrick C. Kintzer-1969

The government of Ceylon established the six Junior University Colleges in 1969.

Part xvi of the Higher Education Act No. 20 of 1966 provided for the establishment of Junior University Colleges in Ceylon. They are two-year colleges, providing courses designed to meet the skill requirements of the developing nation. The primary aim is the further democratization of education by extending it beyond the secondary level.

Junior University Colleges make higher education an opportunity for many high potential students who may not reach the university system. The Junior University Colleges emphasize employment-oriented education rather than purely academic education.

The Junior University College concept was proposed by the Minister of Education and Cultural Affairs of Ceylon, I. M. R. A. Iriyagolla. In 1965, he visited the United States to study institutions of higher education. Among the institutions he visited were the junior colleges of Southern California. Impressed with what he saw, he "returned to Ceylon with renewed enthusiasm and determination to provide semi-professional education for his nation." Many educators and politicians supported the philosophy behind the movement.

=== Workshops ===
Immediately after the appointment of the first group of faculty in the spring of 1968, a series of workshops planned and directed by Charles C. Collins, the first of four scheduled Fulbright professors (1967–68), produced detailed course outlines and developed plans for a comprehensive student personnel services program. For the first time in the nation's history, the junior university colleges were to be staffed by full-time guidance and placement counselors.

== Junior University Colleges ==
Junior University College	Location			Founded	Specialization	Notes
Junior University College	City	District	Province	Founded	Specialization	Notes
Dehiwala Junior University Colleges	Dehiwala	Colombo	Western	1969	Personnel management Librarianship; Journalism; English; Banking practices	it was subsumed by the Sri Lanka Institute of Advanced Technological Education to form a new entity also called Dehiwala Advanced Technical Institute.
Galle Junior University Colleges	Galle	Galle	Southern	1969	Auditing practices Translation; Transport; Purchase and supply	-
Kegalle Junior University Colleges	Kegalle	Kegalle	Sabaragamuwa	1969	Sales and retailmanagement English; Translation; Personnel management	-
Kuliyapitiya Junior University Colleges	Kuliyapitiya	Kurunegala	North Western	1969	Agriculture; Translation; Bookkeeping; English	later elevated Affiliated University College, thereafter as the Wayamba Campus of the Rajarata University of Sri Lanka and presently having the status of a national university name as Wayamba University of Sri Lanka.
Palaly Junior University Colleges	Palali	Jaffna	Northern	1969	Agriculture; Auditing practice English	Discontinued in 1972
Polgolla Junior University Colleges	Polgolla	Kandy	Central	1969	For women	The Junior University Colleges was later elevated to an Affiliated University and named Central Province Affiliated University College; The Central Province Affiliated University College in Polgolla was amalgamated to the Rajarata University of Sri Lanka as its Faculty of Applied Sciences (FASc).
