= Jayantha =

Jayantha is both a given name and a surname. Notable people with the name include:

- Jayantha Amerasinghe (born 1954), Sri Lankan cricketer
- Jayantha Chandrasiri (born 1959), Sri Lankan journalist
- Jayantha Dhanapala (1938–2023), Sri Lankan diplomat
- Jayantha Jayasuriya, Sri Lankan lawyer
- Jayantha Kelegama (1928–2005), Sri Lankan economist
- Jayantha Ketagoda, Sri Lankan politician
- Jayantha Kularathna, Sri Lankan admiral
- Jayantha Paranathala (1950–2023), Sri Lankan cricketer
- Jayantha Perera, Commander of the Sri Lankan Navy
- Jayantha Rathnayake (1968–2020), Sri Lankan music composer
- Jayantha Lal Ratnasekera (born 1962), Sri Lankan academic
- Jayantha Samaraweera (born 1968), Sri Lankan politician
- Jayantha Seneviratne (born 1952), Sri Lankan cricketer
- Jayantha Silva (born 1973), Sri Lankan cricketer
- Jayantha Wattavidanage, Sri Lankan scientist
- Jayantha Weerasinghe (born 1950), Sri Lankan lawyer
- Jayantha Wickramarathne, Sri Lankan Inspector-General of Police
- Jayantha Wijesekara, Sri Lankan politician
- Saman Jayantha (born 1974), Sri Lankan cricketer
