= Open University of Sri Lanka =

University in Sri Lanka

The Open University of Sri Lanka
- ශ්‍රී ලංකා විවෘත විශ්වවිද්‍යාලය இலங்கை திறந்த பல்கலைக்கழகம்
- Crest of Open University of Sri Lanka
- Motto: විද්‍යා සර්වස්‍ය වෘද්ධයෙ(Vidya Sarvasya Vruddhaye)
- Motto in English: Education is regarded with greater esteem than any other entity
- Type: Public
- Established: 1978; 48 years ago
- Accreditation: University Grants Commission (Sri Lanka)
- Affiliations: University Grants Commission of Sri Lanka
- Chancellor: Dr. M. A.Upali Mampitiya
- Vice-Chancellor: Senior Professor P.M.C. Thilakerathne
- Faculty: 6
- Administrative staff: 1,500+
- Students: 35,000+^{[a]}
- Location: Nawala, Nugegoda, Sri Lanka
- Campus: Urban
- Colours: Orange, Black and White
- Website: www.ou.ac.lk

The Open University of Sri Lanka (OUSL; Sinhala: ශ්‍රී ලංකා විවෘත විශ්වවිද්‍යාලය, Tamil: இலங்கை திறந்த பல்கலைக்கழகம்) is a national university in Sri Lanka. It is unique within the Sri Lankan national university system for being the only university to offer programs of study leading to certificates, diplomas, degrees and postgraduate degrees up to PhD level through the Open and Distance Mode of Learning (ODL). The degrees awarded by the university are treated as equivalent to degrees awarded by any other Sri Lankan university under the preview of the University Grants Commission.

The OUSL Main Campus and Colombo regional centre (C010) are located in Colombo in Nawala, Nugegoda. There are 8 regional centers in addition to the main campus at Nawala. They are:

- Kandy Regional Center ( K030 ) – Polgolla, Kandy
- Matara Regional Center ( M050 ) – Nupe, Matara
- Jaffna Regional Center ( J060 ) – Kokuvil, Jaffna
- Anuradhapura Regional Center ( K110 ) – Jayanthi Mawatha, Anuradhapura
- Batticaloa Regional Center ( K070 ) – 23, New Road, Batticaloa
- Badulla Regional Center – No 18/1, Bandaranayake Mw, Badulla
- Kurunegala Regional Center ( K090 ) – Negombo Road, Malkaduwawa, Kurunegala
- Ratnapura Regional Center ( C130 ) – Hidellana, Ratnapura

The Open University of Sri Lanka is currently ranked as No. 9 among Sri Lankan universities and No. 6353 among international Universities.

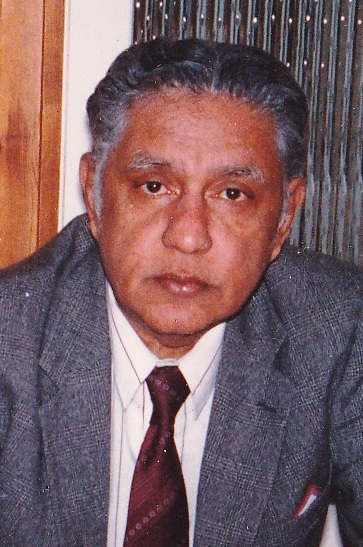
The concept of establishing the Open University of Sri Lanka in 1978 by Cabinet Minister of Education & Higher Education at the time Dr. Nissanka Wijeyeratne

== Establishment and history ==
The concept of establishing the Open University of Sri Lanka was by Dr. Nissanka Wijeyeratne the Cabinet Minister of Education & Higher Education at the time.

As Cabinet Minister of Education and Higher Education, Wijeyeratne introduced the Universities Act No. 16 of 1978 to Parliament. The University of Ceylon was the only university in Ceylon from 1942 until 1978. As a result of this act, it was separated into five independent universities: the University of Colombo, the University of Peradeniya, University of Sri Jayewardenepura, the University of Kelaniya and University of Jaffna. He also proposed the establishment of the University of Ruhuna and the Open University of Sri Lanka .

The university was set up by the Government of Sri Lanka under the Universities Act No. 16 of 1978, for the purpose of providing higher educational opportunities to working adults—providing them the road to success, surpassing age, vocation, gender, race, ethnicity, and religion. The OUSL has the same legal and academic status as any other national university in Sri Lanka.

The university policy on admission would enable a person to register at the lowest 'level' with mere basic literacy and then climb up to postgraduate level.

The concept of Distance Education at the OUSL functions through a dynamic network of regional and study centres, with knowledge imparted through multiple media. Therefore, students with work commitments are able to pursue studies since they interact with especially designed self-instructional materials where the materials function as a "Tutor in Print". This method provides the distance learner with the best possible learning opportunity to enable a balancing of personal, work-related, and academic obligations.

== Admission ==
The Open University of Sri Lanka has a unique admission procedure and criteria for various study programmes.

Any Sri Lankan citizen above 18 years Of age can apply for the university, and there is no upper age limit.

The university, as "The People's University," provides opportunities to climb up from the certificate level to the PhD level and multiple entry and multiple outing options at various study levels.

- Level 06 - Honours degree.
- Level 05 - General degree.
- Level 04 - Advanced diploma.
- Level 03 - Diploma.
- Level 02 - Advanced certificate.

For the degree programmes, the minimum requirement is three simple passes at the G.C.E. advanced level examination. The university does not consider their Z scores or marks received at General common test. The open university of Sri Lanka accepts both local and London AL results. In addition to ALs, some professional degrees require a recognized professional diploma for the admission. Several degree programmes started after a selection test, while other programmes don't.

People who are not carrying Advanced level qualifications can join with their G.C.E. Ordinary-level qualifications to an Advanced certificate programme (degree foundation programmes) at Study Level 02, which is equivalent to G.C.E Advanced levels and SLQF level 02 .After successful completion of an advanced certificate programme, candidates can join with their desired degree or diploma programmes.

All students are Guided and supported by counselling sessions and orientation programmes before registration and throughout the programme. 70%-80% of the course fee is sponsored by the government of Sri Lanka.

The university also offers certificate programmes at level 01 and short courses at level 0 in various fields.

There are unique educational courses called "Continuous Education Courses (CE)" where an individual can continue his or her studies further without registering for a regular degree or diploma programmes.

All applications should be submitted "online" via the OUSL web site and the university does not accept physical applications unless its a short course programme.

== Administration ==
- Chancellor – Dr. M. A. Upali Mampitiya .
- Vice-Chancellor – Prof. P.M.C.Thilakerathne.
- Faculty Deans
  - Faculty of Education – Dr. (Mrs.) D.V.M. De Silva.
  - Faculty of Engineering Technology – Dr. L.S.K. Udugama.
  - Faculty of Humanities & Social Sciences – DR. Athulasiri Samarakoon
  - Faculty of Natural Sciences – Prof. V.P.S. Perera
  - Faculty of Health Sciences- Dr. B. Sunil S. De Silva.
  - Faculty of Management Studies- Prof. Nalin Abeysekera.
- Registrar – Ms. Vindya Jayasena.
- Bursar – Dr. W.M.K.G.A. Wickramasinghe.
- Librarian – Mr. Harsha Balasooriya(Act).

=== Chancellor ===
The Chancellor is the Head of the university and presides at the convocation of the university.

Dr. M. A.Upali Mampitiya is the present chancellor of the Open University of Sri Lanka. He was appointed the Chancellor of OUSL on 30th October 2025.

=== Vice-Chancellor ===
The Vice-Chancellor is the head of administration of the university. Prof. P.M.C.Thilakerathne is the current Vice-Chancellor of The Open University of Sri Lanka. He was appointed on 30th October 2025. The Open University currently does not have a Deputy Vice Chancellor

== Faculties ==
The university consists of six faculties and one postgraduate institute and several divisions. The six faculties are:

1. Faculty of Education
2. Faculty of Engineering Technology
3. Faculty of Humanities and Social Sciences
4. Faculty of Natural Sciences
5. Faculty of Health Sciences
6. Faculty of Management Studies
7. Postgraduate Institute of English (PGIE)- This Post Graduate Institute offers two master's degree programs; Master of Arts in Teaching English as a Second Language (TESL) and Master of Arts in Teaching Literature in a Second Language context (TLSC)

== Faculty of Education ==
- Faculty Dean = Dr. (Mrs.) D.V.M. De Silva.

The Faculty of Education was established in 2003 and currently consists of three departments. These three departments are:

1. Department of Early Childhood and Primary Education
2. Department of Secondary & Tertiary Education
3. Department of Special Needs Education
4. C-DELTA Programme

== Faculty of Engineering Technology ==
- Faculty Dean, Dr. L.S.K. Udugama

The Faculty of Engineering Technology of OUSL offers Bachelor of Science Honours in Engineering [BSc(Hons)Eng ], Bachelor of Industrial Studies (BIS), and Bachelor of Software Engineering Honours [BS.Eng(Hons)]. Bachelor of Science Honours in Engineering degree offered by the Faculty of Engineering Technology is highly recognized by professional Engineering Institutions (IESL); both local and overseas, to work as a qualified Graduate Engineers. It is also the pioneer of introducing Mechatronics Engineering to Sri Lankan engineering education curricula and would be proud of producing the first graduate engineers in Mechatronics engineering in 2010 in Sri Lanka. The faculty consists of six departments. These six departments are

1. Department of Agricultural and Plantation Engineering
2. Department of Civil Engineering
3. Department of Electrical & Computer Engineering
4. Department of Mechanical Engineering
5. Department of Mathematics and Philosophy of Engineering
6. Department of Textile and Apparel Technology

Faculty also offers two Master of Technology programs in Industrial Engineering and Construction Management; each conducted by the Mechanical Engineering and Civil Engineering departments respectively.

== Faculty of Humanities and Social Sciences ==
- Faculty Dean = Prof. Anton Piyarathne

The Faculty of Humanities and Social Sciences (HSS) is the largest faculty of the OUSL. The Faculty consists of the following four departments:

1. Department of English and Language Studies
2. Department of Law
3. Department of Social Studies
4. Department of English Language Teaching

== Faculty of Natural Sciences ==
- Faculty Dean = Professor V.P.S. Perera

The Faculty of Natural Sciences was established in 1987 and consists of the six following departments:

1. Department of Botany
2. Department of Chemistry
3. Department of Computer Science
4. Department of Mathematics
5. Department of Physics
6. Department of Zoology

== Faculty of Health Sciences ==
- Faculty Dean – Dr. B. Sunil S. De Silva.

The Faculty of health Sciences established in August 2015 . It consists of six academic departments.

1. Department of Basic Sciences
2. Department of Health Education and Research
3. Department of Pharmacy
4. Department of Nursing
5. Department of Medical Laboratory Sciences
6. Department of Psychology and Counselling

== Faculty of Management Studies ==
- Faculty Dean – Prof. Nalin Abeysekera.

The Faculty of Faculty of Management Studies established in May 2019 is the youngest faculty of the university. It consists of four academic departments.

1. Department of Organizational Studies
2. Department of Accounting and Finance
3. Department of Human Resource Management
4. Department of Marketing Management

== Bachelors degree programmes ==
3 year General Degrees (level 05);

- Bachelor of Science.
- BA in Social sciences.
- BA in youth and community development.
- Bachelor of Science in Information Technology.

4 year Honours degrees (Level 06);

- Bachelors of science Honours in Physics
- Bachelors of science Honours in Chemistry
- Bachelors of science Honours in Zoology
- Bachelors of science Honours in Botany
- Bachelors of science Honours in Mathematics
- Bachelor of Science Honours in Engineering specialization of Civil Engineering
- Bachelor of Science Honours in Engineering specialization of Mechanical Engineering
- Bachelor of Science Honours in Engineering specialization of Mechatronics Engineering
- Bachelor of Science Honours in Engineering specialization of Computer Engineering
- Bachelor of Science Honours in Engineering specialization of Electrical and Electronic Engineering
- Bachelor of Science Honours in Engineering specialization of Agricultural Engineering
- Bachelor of Science Honours in Engineering specialization of Textile and Apparel Engineering
- Bachelor of Software Engineering Honors.
- Bachelor of Industrial Studies Honours specialization of Agriculture .
- Bachelor of Industrial Studies Honours specialization of Fashion design and apparel production.
- Bachelor of Industrial Studies Honours specialization of Textile manufacture.
- Bachelor of Industrial Studies Honours specialization of Apparel production and management.
- LLB Honours.
- BMS Honours.
- BLIS Honours.
- Bachelor of Science Honours in Nursing .
- Bachelor of pharmacy Honours.
- Bachelor of medical laboratory sciences Honours.
- Bachelors of science Honours in psychology and counseling .
- Bachelor of Science Honours in Information Technology.
- BEdu.Honours Primary teaching .
- BEdu .Honours Special needs education.
- BEdu. Honours Natural sciences.
- BEdu Honours drama and theatre .
- BA Honours Tamil language and Tamil teaching.
- BA Honours English language and English teaching.

== Post graduate programmes ==
- Faculty of natural sciences.
  - MSc in environmental science.
  - MSc in medical entomology and applied parasitology. ( MPhil & PhD opportunities also available.)
- Faculty of engineering technology.
  - Master of Science in Energy for Circular Economy (Joint programme with University of Moratuwa, University of Ruhuna and University of Peradeniya) - Offered by the Department of Mechanical Engineering
  - MSc in structural engineering.
  - Master of Energy Management - Offered by the Department of Mechanical Engineering
  - Master of Science in Industrial Engineering - Offered by the Department of Mechanical Engineering
  - (MPhil & PhD opportunities also available )
- Faculty of Health sciences.
  - Masters in nursing.
- Faculty of Humanities and social

Sciences.

  - LLM in criminal justice.
  - MA development studies and public policy.

(PhD and MPhil opportunities available).

- Faculty of Management studies.
  - MBA in Human resources management.
  - Commonwealth executive master's in Business / Public administration.
- Faculty of education
  - Masters of education.
  - MA in education.
  - Masters in special needs education.
  - MPhil education.
  - PhD education.
  - PGD in education.
  - PGD in special needs education.

== Post graduate institute of English - PGIE ==
Post graduate institute of English of the open university is a dedicated institute for postgraduate level studies in English language and progression of English education in Sri Lanka. The institute issues following postgraduate programmes to the nation.

* PhD in English.

* Mphil in English.

* MA in English teaching.

* MA in literature teaching in second language context.

* PGD in Bilingual education.

* PGD in Professional practice in English.

* PGD in teaching English as a second language.

* English for Masters in teacher education

== Centre for Educational Technology and media -CETMe ==
CETMe of ousl ensures quality education for all faculties through media and education technology. It supports to students by designing and developing self -instructional Materials and educational media. The centre consists of two units :

1 .Academic and research unit.

2 .Production unit - (media house).

CETMe also offers short courses on Educational media and technology, Online course for medical practitioners on old age psychiatry.

CETMe won 09 international awards from Japan, Iran and UNDP .

== Centre for Environmental Studies and Sustainable Development (CESSD) ==
CESSD of open university is established in 2015 with a mission of contribution academically to build a sustainable university, country and a world. Msc in environmental sciences program offered by the Environmental studies unit (ESU) Of CESSD is one of the best Msc Environmental porogrammes offered within the Sri Lankan university system.

According to Green policy adopted by the open University of Sri Lanka in 2018, CESSD involving process of offering more study programmes, engage with environmental research and advocacy, designing few collaborating research projects with UK and Germany.

CESSD has also created Green committee and Green Club forums, provides spaces for teachers and students at open university to engage with Green university concept of the OUSL and its activities.

== Foreign memberships and recognition ==
The open university of Sri Lanka is a member of Association of commonwealth universities (ACU) and Asian Association of open universities (AAOU)

Thus, qualifications offered by open university of Sri Lanka is recognized worldwide; the university also offers fellow ship programmes to officers from above mentioned international academic bodies and Open university of Sri Lanka (OUSL) accepts both national and international students. Currently, many graduates are engaged in their post graduate studies and also employments in international context.

== Psychological Counselling Unit ==
The psychological counselling unit will be committed to meet the needs of students and staff members of OUSL Strive to create an environment where you can feel at home. The service is totally free and confidential.The unit provides following services;

1. Individual counselling.

2. Group counselling.

3. Workshops and talks on relevant aspects .

4. Training and advocate on counselling skill to the staff.

== Non-Academic/ Support Divisions ==
- Library Services
- Educational Technology
- Regional Educational Services
- Information Technology
- Staff Development Centre

== Administrative divisions ==
The administration is done by other Divisions.

Finance Division
Information Technology Division
Establishment Division
General Administration Division
Student Affairs Division
Regional Educational Services Division
Public Information office
Maintenance Division
Operations Division
Internal and Government Audit Division Examination Division

== Study Centers of OUSL ==
There are 18 study centers in OUSL distributed all over Sri Lanka.

1. Ambalangoda ( M041 ) – 80/1.Polwatte Road, Halwatura, Ambalangoda
2. Ambalantota ( M051 ) – Rajasaranagama Road, Lunama South, Ambalantota
3. Ampara ( K080 ) – Inginiyagala Road, Samapura, Ampara
4. Bandarawela ( K120 ) – St Thomas Road, Wewatenna, Bandarawela
5. Galle ( M040 ) – Labuduwa, Galle
6. Gampaha ( C200 ) – Gampaha Road, Miriswatte, Mudungoda
7. Hatton ( K122 ) – Thomndaman Vocational Training Center, Hatton
8. Kegalle ( K140 ) – Kumarathunga Munidasa Mawatha, Kegalle
9. Kalutara ( C020 ) – 66/2, Nagoda Road, Kalutara
10. Kilinochchi ( K032 ) – Lwa Resources Center, Kandy Rd, Kilinochchi
11. Kuliyapitiya ( C100 ) – No.21 Lionel Jayathilaka Mw, Kuliyapitiya
12. Mannar – ( NP44 ) No 363, Thalaimannar Road, Mannar
13. Mullaithivu – ( NP43 ) Oddusuddan Road, Puthukkudiyiruppu, Mullaithivu
14. Monaragala ( M180 ) – Technical College Junction, Sirigala, Potuvil Rd., Monaragala
15. Polonnaruwa ( K150 ) – 24, Post Bediwewa, Jayanthipura, Polonnaruwa
16. Puttalam ( C135 ) – 1/137, Colombo Rd., Puttalam
17. Ratnapura ( C130 ) – Hiddellna, Ratnapura
18. Vavuniya (NP41) – No. 366, Kandy Rd., Thekkawaththai, Vavuniya

== Student activities ==
=== Students Unions ===
"Open University Students Unity" to protect students rights.

== Studying at OUSL ==
The distance learning methodology adopted by the OUSL may initially appear as a challenging task to students. In addition to gaining subject knowledge and skills, students develop many other life skills, including, self-organization, and time management. Regular lectures, a feature of face-to-face teaching at a conventional university, is minimal at the OUSL. Instead, students learn through with other forms of support that facilitate learning.

- Study package

The OUSL adopts a multimedia system for teaching with a strong emphasis on distance learning. The study system supports the students through printed course material, audio visual aids, discussions, day schools, tutor clinics, lab and field works, industry visits, web-based learning, etc. Continuous assessments and final examinations are also integral parts of the study system.

Printed course material is the center element in the study package. Improving reading skills is therefore essential to be successful as an OUSL student. Where applicable, students will also be provided with other supportive material applicable to a course, such as study guides, practical guides, audio visual material, etc. Printed course materials are carefully prepared to suit self study and independent learning. The printed course materials provide the students the subject knowledge of the course. The clearly outline the objectives of the course and what the student will be able to achieve by studying the course. Self-assessment questions and activities included in the course material will enable the learners to continuously assess themselves as they proceed. Printed course materials are normally provided at the time of registration for a programme/course.

== OUSL vocabulary ==
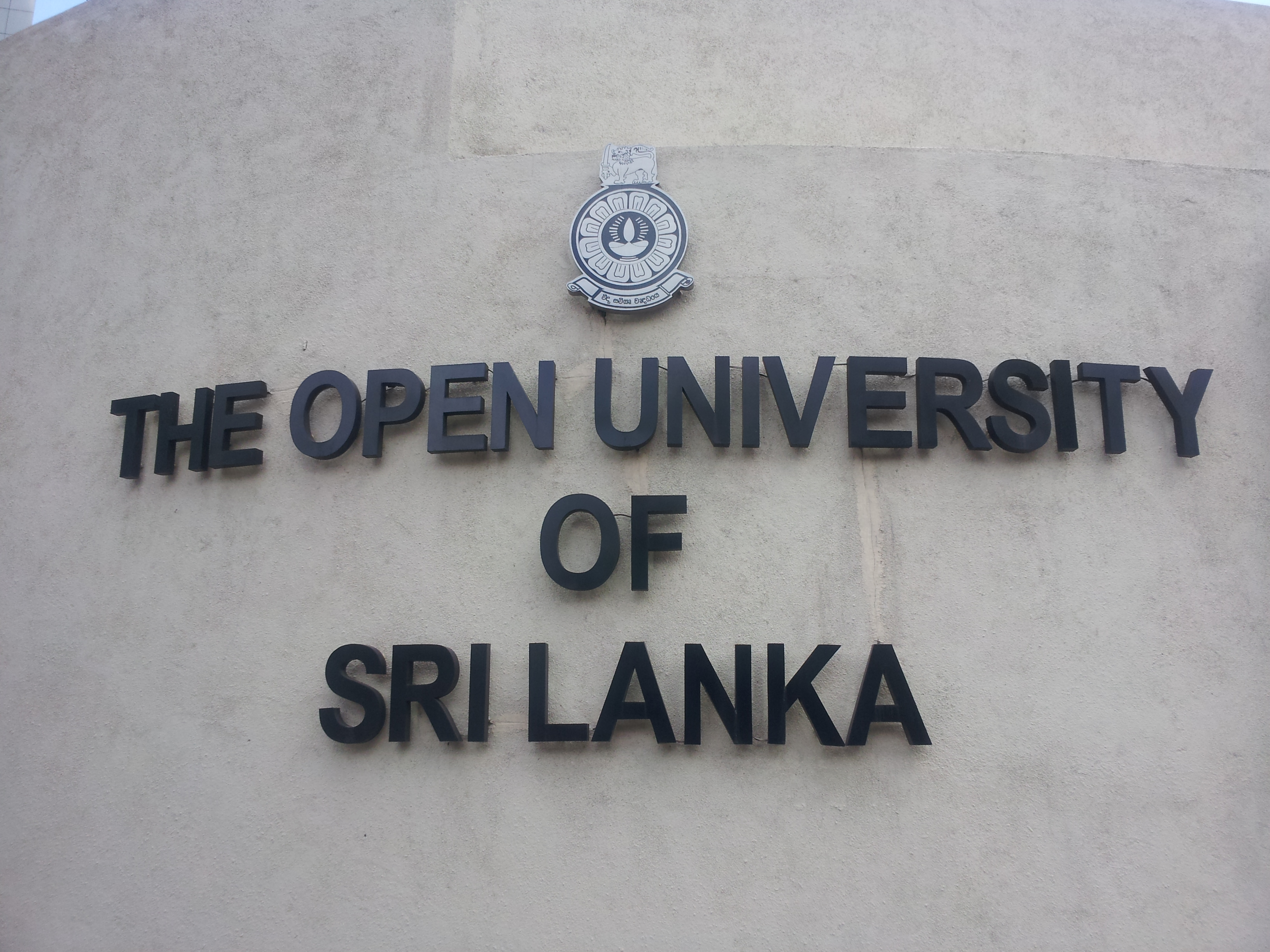
Main campus at Nawala

Once become a student of the OUSL, student need to be familiar with the OUSL terminology. It is important that student understand these terms clearly and be vigilant of these, since most are related to student's performance in studies.

A Programme of study consists of a combination of compulsory and optional courses, which leads to a certificates, certificate of advanced study, diploma, degree or a postgraduate degree.

A Stand Alone Course is a course which can be considered as a separate entity. These courses can be offered by any person who wishes to upgrade the knowledge in a particular subject area, without registering for a regular programme of study, such as a Degree/Certificate Programme. many courses of the Degree Programmes are offered as Stand Alone Courses.

Continuing education courses are offered for students registered for regular programmes of study who wish to widen their knowledge in areas of their choice These include support courses, such as Mathematics, English, Computer literacy, etc. A student can offer a limited number of continuing education courses, over and above the maximum workload allowed during an academic year.

Advanced certificate in Science (ACS) and Advanced certificate in Social sciences(ACSS) are courses offered for those who lack academic qualifications equivalent to that of G.C.E Advanced Level in Sri Lanka. Thus, these are particularly suited for students who lack direct entry requirements for the Degree Programme.it is two-year course equals to 12 & 13 grades of G.C.E Advanced level classes .

=== Credit Rating ===
Programmes as well as courses carry a credit rating. The 'Credit Rating' is the expression used in the OUSL to denote the "Academic value" of a course/programme. Please note that the word credit does not imply any measure of academic performance at an examination such as Credit Pass at G.C.E O/L or A/L Examination. The Credit rating gives a measure of the time expected to be spent on studying the course. At the OUSL, one credit is about 45 hours of study time. The time specified for a course involved, including reading and understanding course material, face-to-face sessions, continuous assessments, final examinations, consultation of reference materials, practical classes, etc.

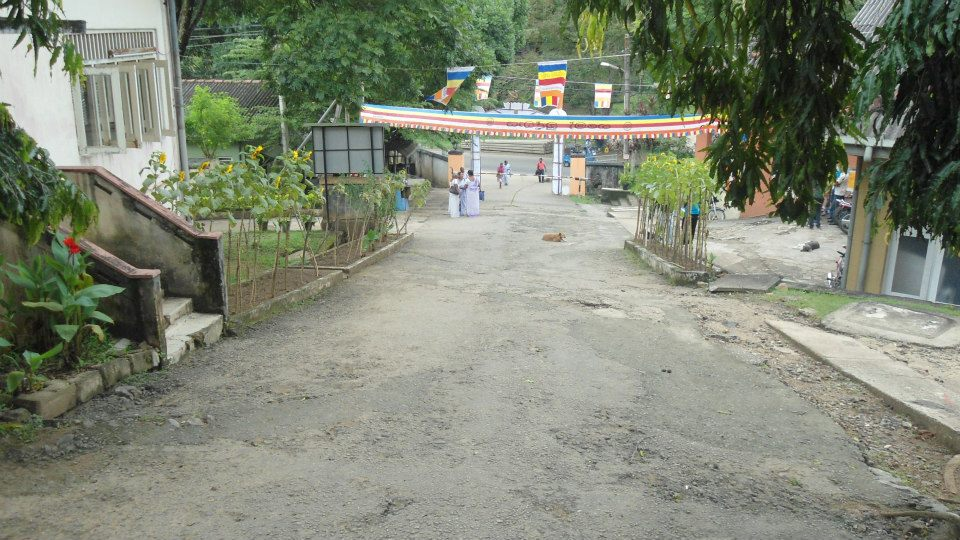
OUSL Kandy regional center at Polgolla

The credit rating of a programme increases progressively, with Certificates usually being 36 credits, a Diploma 90 credits and Undergraduate Degrees comprising 150 or 177 credits, depending on whether degree is a three or four-year programme.

The credit rating of courses also vary. The minimum credit rating of courses presently offered by the Faculty of Natural Sciences is 3. Average total time expected to be spent on a 3 credit course is around 135 hours. In actual study time, this would mean a student is expected to spend 5 hours per week on average, for a 3 credit course that is offered during one year (30 weeks ).

The maximum workload a student may undertake in an academic year is 45 credits. A student may register for a maximum of 2 programmes in the OUSL. However, both programmes should be 45 credits, This corresponds approximately to the workload undertaken in an academic year by a full-time student in conventional university. Many students, who are either employed or with other commitments find it difficult to spend this much of time for their studies and handle this full workload. Students are therefore strongly advised not to register for more than 27 credits especially in their first year of study.

=== Course Code ===
Each course offered by the university is assigned a course code. This code includes certain components of identification that uniquely identifies the course. The particular subject area/discipline is one component of identification used when assigning course codes. The course code also informs the Program of Study for which the course is offered and the level of study at which it is offered. Courses for undergraduate degrees are offered at Levels 3,4,5, and 6, whilst Courses in Foundation are offered at Level 2. In assigning course codes, the program of study is identified by a letter and the level of study is by a digit.

Incorporating all of the above components, each course is assigned a course code consisting of 7 alphanumeric characters. The first three letters indicate the area of discipline and the program of study. The first digit reflects the level of study, the second digit multiplied by 3 will give the credit rating. the last two digits give a unique serial number for the course.

== Support for Learning through Personal Tutors ==
Each student is assigned a personal tutor/counselor during the pre-registration orientation sessions of some programs. The Personal Tutor will guide the students and provide greater awareness about the university, the study system and other particulars regarding the program of study.

Students are also reminded that it is mandatory to get the registration forms certified by the Personal Tutor before coming for registration.

== Day Schools ==
Day Schools are interactive sessions where the student will get the opportunity to meet the respective course teachers to clarify any difficulty they come across in their study material. Attendance at day schools is not compulsory. However, attending a day school well prepared will immensely help students perform well in the courses. Day schools are held almost at all Regional Centers and the students have the option of attending a Day school held at a center of their choice.

Study centres situated all over the island are facilitated to self - study and evaluation of OUSL students.

Tutor clinics are normally held just before the end of semester final exams as an additional help for students preparing for final exams.

== Online Support & MyOUSL ==
In order to give the students additional help and also to familiarize them with modern learning trends and tools, some courses are supplemented with an online component. The online activities could be accessed from home or from the National Online Distance Education Service Access Centers (NAC centers) located at centers specified in Regional centers. Once the student register for a course with an online component, student will be further advised on how to access and use it.

Through MyOUSL, the link , students may access online moodle courses, personal details, timetables, payment details, submit final exam applications, etc..

The university has Open and Distant Learning system. Online Support and MyOUSL hs been found to be helpful for the students.

Centre for Gender Equity and Eaquality :

== Library ==
The OUSL operates a network of libraries comprising the main library at Central Campus, Nawala and 5 other main regional centers. In addition, there are small libraries in each of the Study Centers. The Main library is open for students from 8.30 am to 6.30 pm on each day including week-ends except Full Moon Poya Days and University holidays. The regional center libraries are open during working hours each day, except on Sundays and Mondays.

The main library is well equipped with a substantial collection of books in a wide variety of subjects and many foreign and local journals. The main library is also operates a fully equipped Audio Visual Resource Center (AVRC) with a substantial collection of videos, audios, to supplement print material. The AVRC provides internet facilities for study purposes of students.

In-house photocopying facilities are also available at very nominal rates for the convenience of all library users. The facility of getting inter-library loan of books, journals, and video films is also available. The library has copies of past examination papers, which are also available on the university website. Students are advised to read the library information sheets available at all libraries for more details on the facilities provided and how to make use of them.

== Financial Assistant through Scholarships and Bursaries ==
The Open University of Sri Lanka provides a limited number of bursaries administered by the university and Mahapola Scholarships administered under the Mahapola Trust. Both the Bursaries and Scholarships are offered under the two schemes – merit and need. The main criterion for a merit scholarship is the overall student performance at Final Exams. Guidelines for the Bursaries and Mahapola Scholarships and further information are available with the Assistant Registrar of the each Faculty.

== See also ==
- Jayantha Wattavidanage – a zoologist
