= Post-secondary qualifications in Sri Lanka =

Post-secondary qualifications are qualifications typically studied for after successful completion of secondary school. In Sri Lanka, this is usually after successful completion of the General Certificate of Education. A variety of different post-secondary qualifications are offered in Sri Lanka.

== Academic qualifications ==
=== Degree ===
The degree is the primary post-secondary academic qualification obtained, typically at a higher education institution or a local centre affiliated to a foreign institution. Academic degrees offered include the Bachelor's, Master's, and PhD. Entry requirements for the bachelor's degree typically includes a General Certificate of Education with GCE A Levels in appropriate subjects. Entry requirements for higher degrees typically include lower degrees.

Qualifications may also be awarded in select programmes upon completion of a programme of study that covers part of a degree programme. A Diploma may be awarded after two years of undergraduate study; students may then progress onto a Top-up course, or be given advanced standing, to complete an undergraduate degree. A Postgraduate Certificate may be awarded after the first stage, and a Postgraduate Diploma may be awarded at the second stage, of postgraduate study; students may then be given advanced standing to complete a postgraduate degree.

== Professional qualifications ==
Certain professional qualifications are protected by law and the right to practice is regulated;

=== Attorney-at-Law ===
To practice law in Sri Lanka, one must be admitted and enrolled as an Attorney-at-Law of the Supreme Court of Sri Lanka. This is achieved by passing law exams at the Sri Lanka Law College which are administered by the Council of Legal Education and spending a period of six months under a practicing attorney of at least 8 years standing as an articled clerk. To undertake law exams students must gain admission to the Sri Lanka Law College and study law or directly undertake exams after gaining an LL.B from a local or foreign university. Members of Parliament may gain admission to the Sri Lanka Law College to qualify as lawyers.

=== Chartered Accountant ===
The title of "Chartered Accountant" can be used by only members of the Institute of Chartered Accountants of Sri Lanka (CA Sri Lanka). These could be Associate Members (ACA) and Fellows (FCA). Chartered accountants holding practising certificates may also become "Registered Auditors", who are able to perform statutory financial audits in accordance with the Companies Act, No. 07 of 2007.

=== Company Secretary ===
A company secretary is required to be registered with the Department of Registrar of Companies, to function as a company secretary.

=== Engineer ===
To practice as an Engineer, one needs to be registered with the Engineering Council, Sri Lanka.

=== Medical Practitioner ===
Doctors, Dentists and Pharmacists need to be registered with the Sri Lanka Medical Council to practice in Sri Lanka. Doctors who practice the indigenous medicine system and Ayurveda, needs to be registered with the Sri Lanka Ayurveda Medical Council.

== Vocational qualifications ==
Vocational qualifications are designed to provide career and technical education in specific fields. They may be studied independently or may be earned as part of an Apprenticeship Scheme (AS).

=== National Certificate (NC) ===
The National Certificate (NC) is a vocational post-secondary qualification, providing training and education in a particular trade. National Certificate courses are offered at several levels mapped to the National Qualifications Framework (NQF). Entry requirements may vary based on the course.

=== National Diploma (ND) ===
The National Diploma (ND) is a vocational post-secondary qualification, providing training and education in a particular trade. National Certificate courses are offered at several levels mapped to the National Qualifications Framework (NQF). Entry requirements may vary based on the course.

=== Diploma ===
The Diploma is a post-secondary qualification. The course typically takes two years to complete.

=== Higher National Diploma (HND) ===
The Higher National Diploma (HND) is a post-secondary qualification. Higher National Diploma courses offered by Sri Lankan educational institutions and Edexcel BTEC with accreditation in the United Kingdom.
