= Dandagamuwa Electoral District =

Electoral district of Sri Lanka

Dandagamuwa electoral district was an electoral district of Sri Lanka between August 1947 and March 1960. The district was named after the town of Dandagamuwa in Kurunegala District, North Western Province. The 1978 Constitution of Sri Lanka introduced the proportional representation electoral system for electing members of Parliament. The existing 160 mainly single-member electoral districts were replaced with 22 multi-member electoral districts. Dandagamuwa electoral district was replaced by the Kurunegala multi-member electoral district at the 1989 general elections, the first under the proportional representation system.

== Members of Parliament ==
Key

Independent SLFP UNP

Election	Member	Party	Term
1947	I. M. R. A. Iriyagolle	Ind.	1947-1952
1952	I. M. R. A. Iriyagolle		1952-1956
1956	I. M. R. A. Iriyagolle		1956-1960

== Elections ==
=== 1947 Parliamentary General Election ===
Candidate	Party	Symbol	Votes	%
I. M. R. A. Iriyagolle	Independent	Umbrella	9,355	51.82
J. A. Amaratunga		Elephant	7,839	43.51
P. B. Bogahalanda		Lamp	646	3.59
Valid Votes			17,840	99.03
Rejected Votes			175	0.97
Total Polled			18,015	100.00
Registered Electors			33,767	
Turnout				53.35

=== 1952 Parliamentary General Election ===
Candidate	Party	Symbol	Votes	%
I. M. R. A. Iriyagolle		Umbrella	16,581	66.34
Leelananda, Weerasingha		Lamp	4,839	19.36
T. A. E. Tennakoon		Elephant	2,534	10.14
Magammana, Ariyasingha		Star	896	3.58
Valid Votes			24,850	99.42
Rejected Votes			144	0.58
Total Polled			24,994	100.00
Registered Electors			35,625	
Turnout				70.16

=== 1956 Parliamentary General Election ===
Candidate	Party	Symbol	Votes	%
I. M. R. A. Iriyagolle		Hand	21,704	71.36
S. M. H. M. R. B. Rekawa		Elephant	8,537	28.07
Valid Votes			30,241	99.43
Rejected Votes			175	0.57
Total Polled			30,416	100.00
Registered Electors			40,972	
Turnout				74.24
