= G. W. Samarasinghe =

Sri Lankan politician (born 1916)

Galewattegedera Wijayasiri Samarasinghe (31 October 1916 - 19??) was a Sri Lankan politician. He was the Deputy Minister of Social Services and the member of Parliament of Sri Lanka from Kuliyapitiya representing the Sri Lanka Freedom Party.

He first contested from Kuliyapitiya in the March 1960 general election, and lost to I. M. R. A. Iriyagolle. He was able to win the July 1960 general election defeating Iriyagolle and was elected to parliament. He lost the 1965 general election to Iriyagolle and defeated Iriyagolle at the 1970 general election and was appointed Deputy Minister of Social Services in the second Bandaranaike administration. He was then defeated in the 1977 general election by Lionel Jayatillake.
