= 1956 anti-Tamil pogrom =

First major Sinhalese-Tamil clash in Ceylon

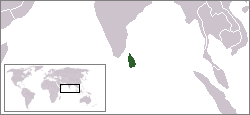
- Location of Sri Lanka
- Location: Dominion of Ceylon
- Date: June 5–16, 1956 (+6 GMT)
- Target: Majority Tamil civilians in Colombo and Gal Oya, also Sinhalese civilians in Batticaloa and Gal Oya
- Attack type: Decapitation, burning, stabbing, arson, assault, looting
- Weapons: Knives, sticks, fire
- Deaths: 20-200
- Injuries: 100+
- Perpetrators: Vast majority Sinhalese mobs, also Tamil mobs

The first organized pogrom against Sri Lankan Tamils took place in 1956. It began with anti-Tamil rioting in Colombo, followed by anti-Sinhalese rioting in the Batticaloa District. The worst of the violence took place in the Gal Oya valley after the Batticaloa attacks, where local majority Sinhalese colonists and employees of the Gal Oya Development Board commandeered government vehicles, dynamite and weapons and massacred minority Tamils. It is estimated that over 150 people, the vast majority Tamils, had died during the violence. The police and army were eventually able to bring the situation under control.

== Background information ==
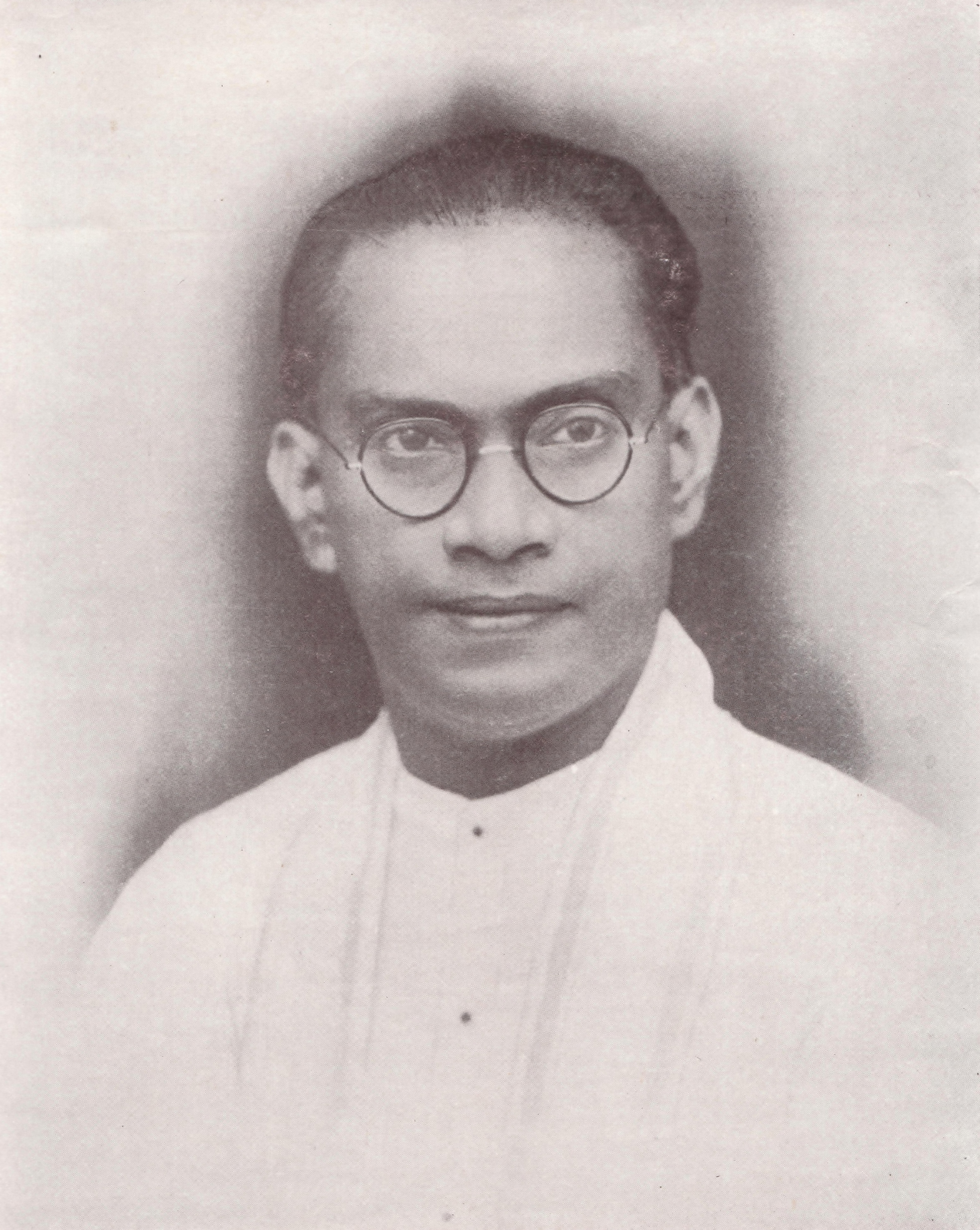
Prime Minister S. W. R. D. Bandaranaike.

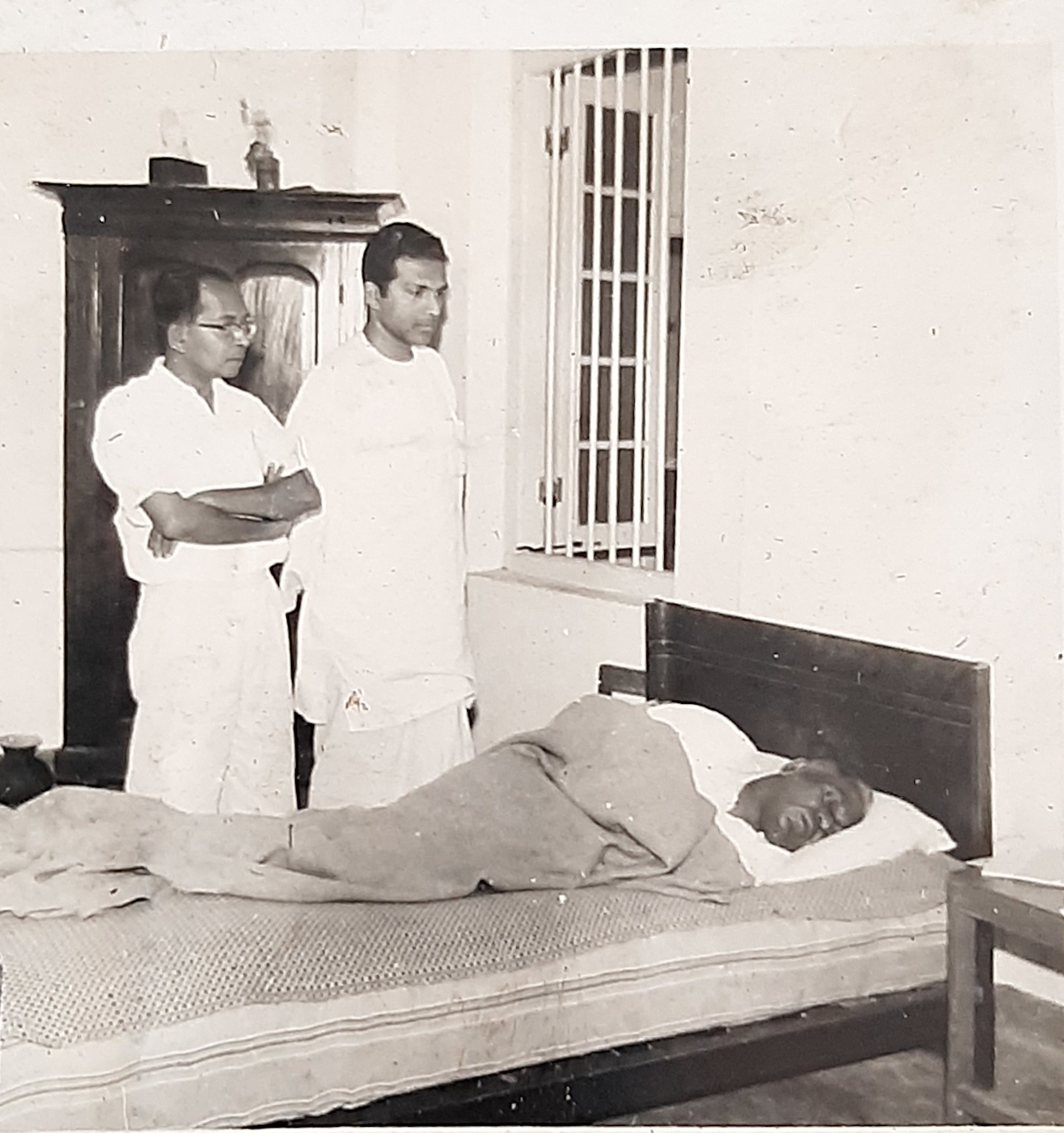
Fast unto death by Prof. F.R. Jayasuriya in 1956, to force Bandaranaike government to implement the Sinhala as the only State language excluding Tamil language of masses in the country's north and east provinces.

=== Gal Oya settlement scheme ===
Gal Oya settlement scheme began in 1949 to settle landless peasants in formerly jungle land. Gal Oya river in the Eastern province was dammed and a tank was created with 40,000,000 acres (160,000 km^{2}) of irrigated land. In 1956 the settlement had over 50 new villages where over 5,000 ethnic Tamil, Muslim, Indigenous Veddha and Sinhalese were settled. The Sinhalese were approximately 50% of the settlers. Sinhalese and others were spatially separated from each other as Sinhalese were settled at the more productive headwaters of the Gal Oya tank and the Tamils and Muslims at the down rivers closer to their former native villages. Settlement of large number of Sinhalese peasants in what Tamil nationalists considered their traditional Tamil homeland was a source of tension within the settlement area.

=== Sinhala Only Act ===
By 1946, 33% of clerical jobs in Ceylon were held by Sri Lankan Tamils, although they were 11% of the country's population. This was partly due to the availability of Western style education built by American missionaries in the Tamil dominant Jaffna Peninsula during the colonial era. The overrepresentation of Tamils was used by populist Sinhalese politicians to come to political power by promising to elevate the Sinhalese people. The pro-Sinhalese nationalist Freedom Party came to power in April 1956 promising to make Sinhala, the language of the majority Sinhalese people, the sole official language.

In the first week of May 1956, Prime Minister S. W. R. D. Bandaranaike met with the Attorney General and the Legal Draftsman giving guidelines for the Language Bill. Bandaranaike intended to honour the mandate he got by making Sinhala the only official language, while making provisions for the reasonable use of Tamil in the northern and eastern provinces. On hearing this, Prof. F. R. Jayasuriya started a fast unto death at the parliament demanding Sinhala to be the only official language with no concessions granted to Tamil. Bandaranaike gave in and had the Language Bill changed.

In response to the proposed Language Bill the Working Committee of the Tamil Federal Party met in Jaffna to consider how to display its opposition to the Language Bill, unanimously deciding to perform a satyagraha at the steps of parliament. Its leader S. J. V. Chelvanayakam wrote to Bandaranaike on 4 June stating their decision, to which Bandaranaike issued a severe warning. Chelvanayakam responded by saying that repressive measures would "only whet the appetite of the Tamils for freedom". A contingent of volunteers were brought from Jaffna, Batticaloa and Trincomalee to Colombo by train and housed on the Bambalapitiya Vinayagar Temple.

The Sinhala Basha Arakshaka Madalaya (Sinhala Language Protection Council) had threatened to counter the Federalists' protest with a protest of its on with L. H. Mettananda claiming to meet force to force. Mettananda further called for a boycott of Tamil professionals and businesses. With communal passions running high, Bandaranaike aware of the looming danger tried to get Chelvanayakam to cancel the satyagraha demonstration. However, the Federal Party and its supporters saw no reason to cancel.

== Riots ==
=== Federalist satyagraha attacked ===
The volunteers were joined by others from Colombo on the morning of 5 June. This group was briefed by V. Navaratnam, and it formed double file and walked towards Parliament singing devotional songs and holding placards led by Chelvanayakam and C. Vanniasingam. The satyagraha protest congregated outside the parliament after the government decided to close the parliamentary debate to the public and barricade the building. They then decided to move the protest to Galle Face Green, where they sat down.

They were met by a crowd of 500 Sinhalese extremists, who pounced on them, tore up the placards and used the poles to beat them up. Vanniasingam lost his national vest and was dragged some distance by his feet. One by one the mob started trampling him. C. Suntharalingam was assaulted and A. Amirthalingam was wounded in the head. Dr E. M. V. Naganathan fought back with his fists and feet. S. Z. M. Mashoor Moulana was picked up by four members of the mob and thrashed onto the floor, before he was dragged across the floor and thrown into the Beira lake. Two Sinhalese MPs, K. M. P. Rajaratne and Nimal Karunatilake, were with the lion flag and had led the mob towards the protestors and were pointing out Federal Party MPs.

The satyagrahis were beaten and pelted with stones, while another Tamil protestor had his ear bitten off. The protest was called off at 1PM. Several Tamils were hospitalized and some of the wounded included parliamentarians. The police stood by as observers having been ordered not to intervene unless they themselves were attacked. Some of the Tamil protesters including Dr Naganathan and Navaratnam were thrown into the Beira lake.

=== Riots spread in Colombo ===
The mob also stoned peaceful Tamil protesters as they marched to board a train heading back to Batticaloa at the Fort railway station. The same mob, after listening to a speech by populist Sinhalese politicians urging them to boycott Tamil businesses, then went on a spree of arson and looting in the city. Every Tamil seen on the streets of Colombo was then attacked by the mob, including Tamil office workers going home from work. Over 150 Tamil owned shops were looted and many people were hospitalized for their injuries. Tamil senator S. Nadesan gave his account about the event:

“Hooligans, in the very precincts of Parliament House, under the very nose of the Prime Minister of this country, set upon those innocent men seated there, bit their ears and beat them up mercilessly. Not one shot was fired while all this lawlessness to persons were let loose... Why? Orders had been given: 'Do not shoot, just look on.'

Thereafter... every Tamil man was set upon and robbed. He was beaten up. His fountain pen and wristlet were snatched away. He was thrashed mercilessly, humiliated and sent home. The police were looking on while all this was happening before their very eyes.

Shops were looted... but the police did nothing... specific instructions had been given to the police that they should not shoot, should not arrest, should not deal with the lawlessness and disorder that was let loose... rowdies and hooligans were given a free hand to assault, humiliate and rob any innocent Tamil walking the roads on that day.'

Eventually order was restored in Colombo after police opened fire on the rioting mobs, wounding eight in the process.

=== Attacks on Sinhalese in the Batticaloa-Kalmunai area ===
Following the riots in Colombo, Tamils in Batticaloa attacked Sinhalese. Sinhalese were assaulted and their houses and other property were burnt. In one case, a Sinhalese hotel was burned. An employee of this hotel emerged from the burning hotel and fired at a crowd that had gathered to watch the conflagration, killing two Tamils. Police had also fired on crowd of 10,000 demonstrating Tamils, killing another two Tamils. Several Sinhalese families took refuge in the Buddhist temple and hospital and complained that government authorities had not given them adequate support.

Along the road from Batticaloa to Kalmunai, there had been further attacks on Sinhalese, including an attack on a car with Sinhalese. Tamils from Karaitivu had thrown stones at Gal Oya Board trucks. Near Kalmunai, a group of 11 Tamils hid in trees and shot at a convoy of Sinhalese civilians and government officials. Two were shot dead.

=== Gal Oya ===
On 9 June, the trucks that had been stoned arrived in Gal Oya. News of the attacks on Sinhalese in the Batticaloa-Kalmunai area started reaching the valley, and with it, false rumours. The chief amongst the rumours was that a Sinhalese girl had been raped and made to walk naked down the street in Batticaloa by a Tamil mob. Although this was later proved to be false, the rumor inflamed the passions of the mob and led to further massacres and property destruction. On 11 June, agitated Sinhalese mobs began roaming the streets of Gal Oya valley looking for Tamils to physically assault. Some Tamils were severely clubbed on their skulls and admitted to hospital. Properties owned by Tamils, including those of Indian Tamils, were looted and burned down. It was rumored that the local police made no attempt to control the mob.

Tamil refugees from Amparai had fled to the Amparai police station and the Circuit Bungalow under police protection. On the evening of 12 June, a Sinhalese mob surrounded the latter location, threatening to break in. At first, police used tear gas to try and disperse the mob. The mob tried to stop a jeep with a Bren gun; at this point, the police opened fire, killing three of rioters. Then the mob severed the utilities and stole dynamite from a dynamite dump in Inginiyagala to try to blow up the bungalow. They were unable to acquire detonators, and by 11 PM, the military arrived and disperse the crowd. After this, Sinhalese rioters took vehicles and went on a rampage against Tamils, assaulting Tamils and killing some. The Tamils in Gal Oya fled to areas outside the Gal Oya valley. In return, Tamil mobs burned irrigation and construction camps on the border of the Gal Oya area and shot a number of Sinhalese.

On the morning of 13 June, a truck arrived with Sinhalese refugees from Bakiela who had been attacked by Tamil colonists. By noon of that day, there were further rumors that an army of 6,000 Tamils armed with guns were in the process of approaching the Sinhalese settlements in the Gal Oya valley. This led local groups of Sinhalese men to commandeer government vehicles to travel to outlying Tamil villages while Sinhalese officials and settlers fled. It was only after the arrival of army reinforcements and stern action taken by them that the killings and destruction were suppressed. Deputy Inspector-General of Police Sydney de Zoysa personally went to Gal Oya valley and threatened local politicians with arrest if they incited the mob to violence, even if they were Cabinet Ministers.

Journalist Tarzie Vittachi states that over 150 civilians were killed in the entire Gal Oya valley during the entirety of the riots. Historian James Manor similarly states that scores of Tamils, certainly well over 100, were massacred in Gal Oya. The government claimed that 26 were killed, 14 being Sinhalese.

=== Parliamentary Debates ===
The riots were discussed in detail in parliament.

Pieter Keuneman, third member for Colombo Central noted that, while the Eastern Province had a history of communal rioting, the events of June 1956 dwarfed them. He contended that explanations completely attributing the violence to factors peculiar to the Gal Oya valley, such as labor strikes, food shortages, or resentment against the administration, were not sufficient, and instead argued that the riots took place in the context of earlier incidents against Sinhalese in the Batticaloa-Kalmunai area. He also argued that there were too few police in the Gal Oya valley, and that the government should be more careful when forming mixed colonies, where he noted most of the violence took place. He called for a commission of inquiry.

S. J. V. Chelvanayakam, the leader of the Federal Party commented on the violence and expressed his wish for an investigation regardless of who attacked whom. He felt that while there had been attacks on Sinhalese by Tamils in the Batticaloa-Kalmunai area, they did not amount to riots as had occurred in Colombo and Gal Oya.

== Casualties ==
Source	Sinhalese	Tamil	Others	Total
Official	14	10	2	26
Vittachi	-	-	-	150+
Wriggins	-	-	-	20-200
Manor	-	100+	-	100+

== See also ==
- List of riots in Sri Lanka
- Sri Lankan Civil War
