= ATI Kegalle =

Advanced Technological Institute – Kegalle
- Type: Public
- Established: 2009
- Students: 1000
- Location: Kegalle, Sri Lanka; 7°14′50″N 80°21′18″E
- Campus: Urban
- Website: kegalle.sliate.ac.lk

Advanced Technological Institute, Kegalle is one of the Government Institutes for Higher Studies. ATI Kegalle offers Four courses: Higher National Diploma in Information Technology, Higher National Diploma in Accountancy, and Higher National Diploma in English & Higher National Diploma in Project Management. These courses are under the control of the Sri Lanka Institute of Advanced Technological Education (SLIATE)
