= National Diploma (Sri Lanka) =

A National Diploma is a standard academic qualification, offered by most further education colleges and universities in Sri Lanka.

== National Diplomas ==
The following diplomas are level 5 in the National Vocational Qualifications (NVQ) of Sri Lanka:

- National Diploma in Technology (NDT)
- National Diploma in Engineering Sciences (NDES)
- National Diploma in Information Technology (NDICT)

== Higher National Diplomas ==
The following diplomas are level 6 in the NVQ of Sri Lanka:

- Higher National Diploma in Accountancy (HNDA)
- Higher National Diploma in Business Administration (HNDBA)
- Higher National Diploma in Business Management (HNDBM)
- Higher National Diploma in Business Finance (HNDBF)
- Higher National Diploma in Building Service Engineering (HNDBSE)
- Higher National Diploma in Food Technology (HNDFT)
- Higher National Diploma in Engineering (HNDE)
  - HND in Civil Engineering
  - HND in Electrical Engineering
  - HND in Mechanical Engineering
- Higher National Diploma in English (HND in English)
- Higher National Diploma in Information Technology (HNDIT)
- Higher National Diploma in Management (HNDM)
- Higher National Diploma in Agriculture (HNDT-Agri)
- Higher National Diploma in Tourism and Hospitality Management (HNDTHM)
- Higher National Diploma in Quantity Survey (HNDQS)
