= Kuliyapitiya Electoral District =

Electoral district of Sri Lanka

Kuliyapitiya electoral district was an electoral district of Sri Lanka between March 1960 and February 1989. The district was named after the town of Kuliyapitiya in Kurunegala District, North Western Province. The 1978 Constitution of Sri Lanka introduced the proportional representation electoral system for electing members of Parliament. The existing 160 mainly single-member electoral districts were replaced with 22 multi-member electoral districts. Kuliyapitiya electoral district was replaced by the Kurunegala multi-member electoral district at the 1989 general elections.

== Members of Parliament ==
Key

Independent SLFP UNP

Election	Member	Party	Term
1960 (March)	I. M. R. A. Iriyagolle		1960
1960 (July)	G. W. Samarasinghe		1960-1965
1965	I. M. R. A. Iriyagolle		1965-1970
1970	G. W. Samarasinghe		1970-1977
1977	Lionel Jayatillake		

== Elections ==
=== 1960 (March) Parliamentary General Election ===
Candidate	Party	Symbol	Votes	%
Valid Votes				100.00%
Rejected Votes				
Total Polled				
Registered Electors				
Turnout				

=== 1960 (July) Parliamentary General Election ===
Candidate	Party	Symbol	Votes	%
Valid Votes				100.00%
Rejected Votes				
Total Polled				
Registered Electors				
Turnout				

=== 1965 Parliamentary General Election ===
Candidate	Party	Symbol	Votes	%
I. M. R. A. Iriyagolle		Elephant	17,246	52.90
G. W. Samarasinghe		Hand	14,428	44.25
A. T. Somaratna		Cartwheel	809	2.48
Valid Votes			32,483	99.63
Rejected Votes			119	0.37
Total Polled			32,602	100.00
Registered Electors			38,252	
Turnout				85.23

=== 1970 Parliamentary General Election ===
Candidate	Party	Symbol	Votes	%
G. W. Samarasinghe		Hand	19,963	52.32
I. M. R. A. Iriyagolle		Elephant	18,055	47.32
Valid Votes			38,018	99.64
Rejected Votes			136	0.36
Total Polled			38,154	
Registered Electors			42,974	
Turnout				88.78

=== 1977 Parliamentary General Election ===
Candidate	Party	Symbol	Votes	%
Lionel Jayatillake		Elephant	26,000	59.21
Wijayasiri Samarasinghe		Hand	16,927	38.55
W. A. Abeysinghe		Star	853	1.94
Valid Votes			43,780	99.70
Rejected Votes			134	0.30
Total Polled			43,914	100.00
Registered Electors			48,552	
Turnout				90.45
