= Gal Oya =

Gal
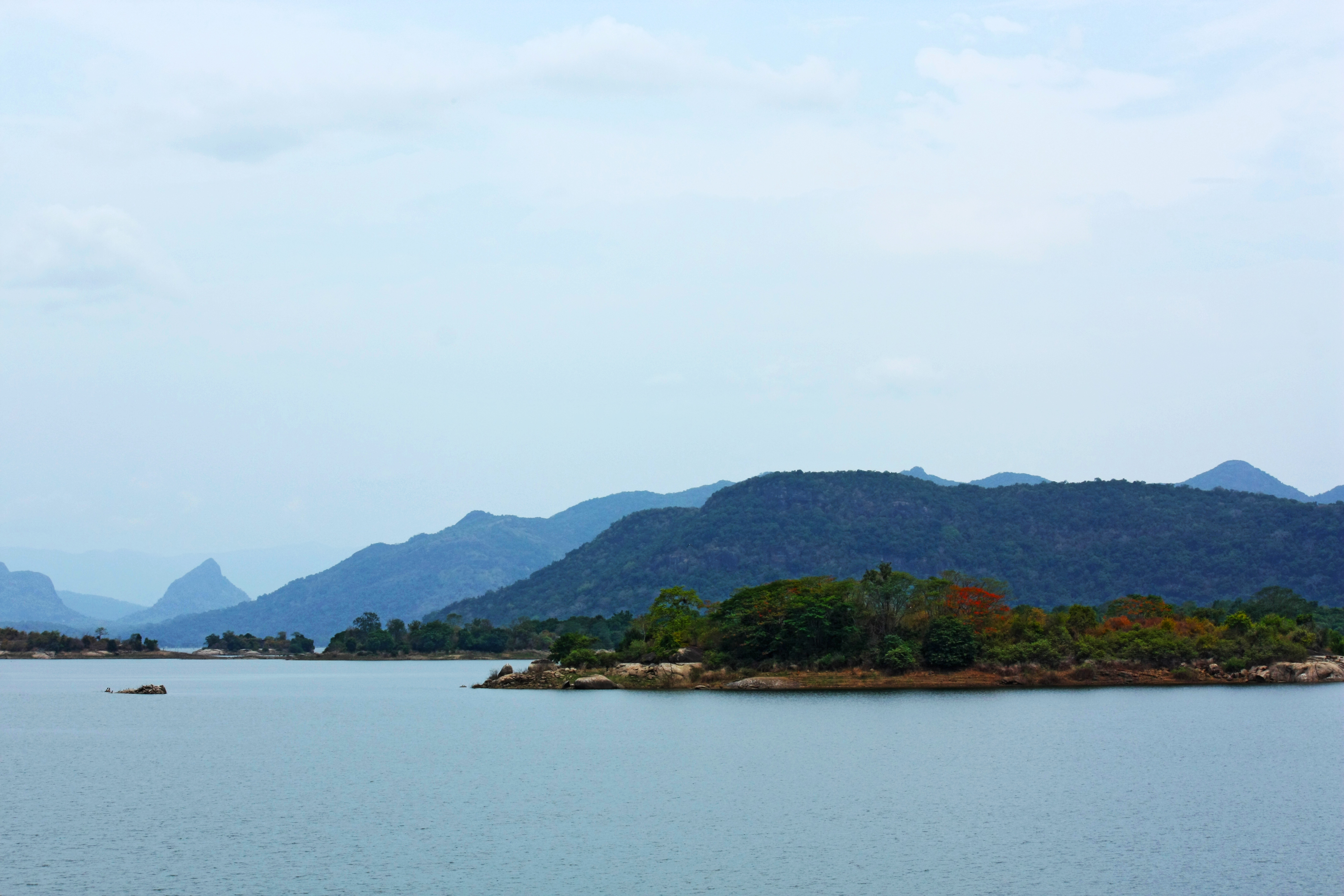
- Gal Oya Dam in Gal Oya

Location
- Country: Sri Lanka

Physical characteristics
- Source
  - elevation: 1,524 m (5,000 ft)
- Mouth: Indian Ocean
  - location: Ampara
  - coordinates: 07°18′01″N 81°51′54″E
- Length: 108 km (67 mi)

The Gal Oya is a 108 km (67 mi) long river, in southeast Sri Lanka. It is the 16th longest river in Sri Lanka. It begins in the hills east of Badulla and flows northeast, emptying into the Indian Ocean south of Kalmunai.

The river was dammed in 1948 as part of the Gal Oya scheme. The dam created the Senanayake Samudra — the largest reservoir in Sri Lanka, at Bintenne. Resettlement of the Tamils and Sinhalese people displaced in this scheme gave rise to among the first ethnic riots in Sri Lanka.

The Gal Oya project resulted in the formation of the 100,000 acre Gal Oya basin. This basin has since been used for cultivating paddy, chillies, sugarcane and potatoes. The Gal Oya National Park in the vicinity has a wide variety of wildlife including bears, leopards and elephants.

== See also ==
- List of rivers in Sri Lanka
- Gal Oya Dam
- Gal Oya National Park
- Gal Oya riots
