= Chartered Engineer (Sri Lanka) =

Sri Lankan professional qualification

In the Sri Lanka, a Chartered Engineer is an Engineer registered with the registered with the engineering council and Institution of Engineers, Sri Lanka. It is based on the British designation of Chartered Engineer.

== Registration ==
Only the Institution of Engineers, Sri Lanka (IESL) registers its Corporate Members as Chartered Engineer based on their selection criteria and peer-reviewed process. To practice as a Chartered Engineer in Sri Lanka, one needs to be registered with the Engineering Council.

== Qualifications ==
Qualifications required for registration is determined by the Institution of Engineers and as of recent require an accredited degree in engineering following the discontinuation of the mature entry route, where engineers with other qualifications and experience used to apply.

== Designatory lettering ==
Chartered Engineers are entitled to use the suffix, CEng (Sri Lanka) after names.

== Criticism ==
The process of selecting Chartered Engineers have been criticized, due to only IESL having the authority to award the designation and sole discretion to determine the selection criteria. In 2010, it discontinued the mature entry route for non-degree holding applicants to apply for Chartered Engineer designation. However, it grants membership to diploma graduates of the IESL owned IESL College of Engineering Pvt. Ltd., forcing non-degree holding applicants to undertake its fee levied IESL College courses to gain IESL membership.

== See also ==
- Chartered Engineer (UK)
