= Sri Lanka Institute of Advanced Technological Education =

University in Sri Lanka

- ශ්‍රී ලංකා උසස් තාක්ෂණ අධ්‍යපන ආයතනය இலங்கை உயர் தொழில்நுட்ப நிறுவனம்
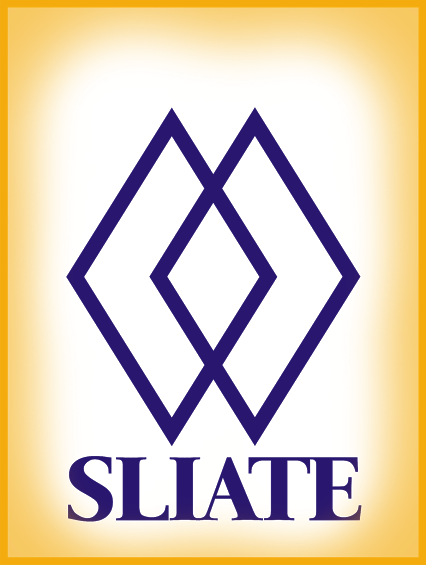
- Former names: Junior University Colleges (1969-1995); Hardy Technical Training Institute (1956-1969); Ceylon Technical College (1893-1956)
- Type: Public
- Established: 1893; 133 years ago (as the Ceylon Technical College)
- Accreditation: TVEC
- Director General: Dr. Lakshman Jayarathna
- Students: 24,697
- Location: Colombo, Sri Lanka; 6.923718°N 79.861448°E
- Campus: Main campus: Ampara Hardy Dehiwala Labuduwa Colombo Jaffna Naiwala, Western Province Badulla
- Colours: Orange, black & white
- Website: sliate.ac.lk

The Sri Lanka Institute of Advanced Technological Education (Sinhala: ශ්‍රී ලංකා උසස් තාක්ෂණ අධ්‍යපන ආයතනය; Tamil: இலங்கை உயர் தொழில்நுட்ப நிறுவனம்) (also known as SLIATE) is a statutory body in Sri Lanka coming under the purview of the Higher Education Ministry and offering Higher National Diploma courses. At present, it manages and supervises eighteen provincial Advanced Technological Institutes throughout the island. The institute is traditionally known for its education in the accountancy and engineering. As per the recommendations of the Committee appointed by Prof. Wiswa Waranapala, Deputy Minister of Higher Education in 1994, the Sri Lanka Institute of Advanced Technical Education (SLIATE) was formed in 1995, under the Sri Lanka Institute of Advanced Technical Education Act No. 29 of 1995. In 2001, the name of the institution was amended as Sri Lanka Institute of Advanced Technological Education (SLIATE).

== Campuses ==
=== Hardy Advanced Technological Institute ===
The Hardy Advanced Technological Institute is located in Ampara, Sri Lanka. Founded in 1956 by Prof. Allen Hardy as the Technical Training Institute with aid from the Colombo Plan, Food and Agriculture Organization (FAO) and the Asia Foundation, it was renamed as Hardy Senior Technical Institute (HSTI) in 1967. The 1951 Prof. Allen Hardy, arrived from Canada in Sri Lanka as the UN/FAP Advisor to the Department of Agriculture. He worked at the Maha Illuppalama Agricultural Centre and later was appointed to direct a training programme and to set up The TTI with "Honesty-Training-Industry" as its motto. Courses for the first batch of students commenced on 14 January 1956. The institute conducted two-years Diploma Courses in Civil Engineering, Mechanical Engineering, Electrical Engineering, and Agriculture Engineering. The United Kingdom and Canada classified the TTI as a Regional Technical Training Institute (RTTI) for South East Asian Countries under the Colombo Plan.

From 15 January 1956 to the time of his death on 4 December 1963 (while serving TTI), Prof. Allen Hardy served in the TTI to educate people with no previous mechanical experience and to get them to assume responsibility. As a tribute him, TTI was renamed Hardy Technical Training Institute (HTTI) after his death.

In 1967, the institute was handed over to the Technical Education Unite of the Ministry of Education and subsequently, renamed the Hardy Senior Technical Institute (HSTI).

In 1976, the National Diploma in Technology (NDT) engineering second-year courses were transferred from HSTI to Katubedda which later became a separate unit under the University of Moratuwa. In 1980, all Diploma level engineering courses were transferred to the University of Moratuwa except NDT (Agriculture) and other trade courses.

In 1995, passed the parliamentary act No 29 "Sri Lanka Institute of Advanced Technological Education (SLIATE)" was established under the Ministry of Higher Education. The NDT Agriculture course conducted by Hardy Technical College was absorbed to Hardy Advanced Technological Institute which was established under SLIATE. Under the administration of SLIATE new courses commenced at Hardy Advanced Technological Institute such as Higher National Diploma in Information Technology in 2007, Higher National Diploma in English (Fulltime) in 2007, Higher National Diploma in English (Part time) in 2008, Higher National Diploma in Accountancy (full time) in 2009, Higher National Diploma in Accountancy (Part time) in 2010 and Higher National Diploma in Management in 2011.

=== Dehiwala Advanced Technological Institute ===
The Dehiwala Advanced Technological Institute was a Junior University Colleges (Sri Lanka) in Sri Lanka (earlier Ceylon) from 1969 until 1972. It was subsumed by the Sri Lanka Institute of Advanced Technological Education to form a new entity also called Dehiwala Advanced Technical Institute.

.... The Junior University Colleges are destined in the decades ahead to bring lasting benefits of great value to their students, to each of the cities and towns, hence to the Nation,
Prof.Fredrick C. Kintzer-1969

The concept of the junior college is spreading throughout the world. The government of Ceylon established the six junior university colleges in 1969.

Part xvi of the Higher Education Act No. 20 of 1966 provides for the establishment of Junior University Colleges in Ceylon. These are two-year colleges providing courses with a practical bias designed to meet the manpower requirements of the developing nation. The primary aim of the Junior College is the further democratization of education by extending it to beyond the secondary level.

The Junior University Colleges give the higher educational opportunity to many high potential students who were barred from admission to the university system. The Junior University College strived to meet the manpower needs of both the public and the private sector, emphasizing employment-oriented rather than purely academic education that leads directly to job placement

The idea of a Junior University Colleges of Ceylon was proposed by the Minister of Education and Cultural Affairs of Ceylon, I. M. R. A. Iriyagolla. In 1965, he visited the United States to study institutions of higher education. Among the institutions visited were the junior colleges of Southern California, was impressed with what he saw and "returned to Ceylon with renewed enthusiasm and determination to provide semi-professional education for his nation" The junior university colleges system is at the apex of Ceylon's educational reforms. Many educators and politicians supported the philosophy behind the movement.

=== Other Campuses ===
1. Kandy ATI
2. Kurunagala ATI
3. Badulla ATI
4. Jaffna ATI
5. Naiwala / Gampaha ATI
6. Trincomalee ATI
7. Labuduwa / Galle ATI
8. Colombo ATI
9. Kegalle ATI
10. Vavunia ATI
11. Mannar ATI
12. Anuradhapura ATI
13. Batticaloa ATI
14. Trincomalee ATI
15. Samanthurei ATI
16. Rathnapura ATI
17. Tangalle ATI
18. Nawalapitiya ATI

== NVQ Level 6 Equivalence to HND Programmes of SLIATE ==
Tertiary & Vocational Education Commission (TVEC) has granted NVQ level 6 equivalence to the following HND programmes of SLIATE.

- HNDT – Agriculture
- HND in Electrical & Electronic Engineering
- HND in Civil Engineering
- HND in Mechanical Engineering
- HND in Food Technology
- HND in Information Technology

Director General of TVEC Mr. S. U. K. Rubasinghe & Director General of SLIATE Prof. K. T. M. U. Hemapala for the agreement to offer NVQ level 6 to the above SLIATE programmes. Ms. W. A. W. C. Premarathne, Director (NVQ) of TVEC and Dr. (Ms.) W. B. K. Bandara, Director (Planning & Research) of SLIATE also have participated for the meeting held at TVEC on 3 April 2019.

== Courses ==
Advanced Technology Institute conducts 12 courses:

=== Higher National Diploma in Accountancy ===
The Higher National Diploma in Accountancy (HNDA) program is the first professional accounting course introduced in Sri Lanka. It was started in 1943 as the National Diploma in Accountancy with the aim of detecting and preventing frauds, errors, and malpractices in Ceylon Tea Estates and Ceylon Railway. Then, it was converted to a Higher National Diploma in Accountancy (HNDA) in 1946. The Ceylon Technical College at Maradana was set up by the colonial government in 1893, accounting education was not given a place in its programs for another fifty years. Only after 1942 did the Ceylon Technical College take steps to organize and offer certificate and diploma courses in accounting. Accordingly, a commercial certificate course for bookkeepers and a diploma course for prospective accountants were launched by the Technical College in 1943 and 1946 respectively. These courses were modelled on similar programs of studies offered in the U.K. Since the Diploma in Accountancy was a four-year evening course offered at the professional level the admission to the course was restricted to those who were engaged in accounting related activities. The curriculum of this course was quite similar to those of the leading professional accounting bodies in the U.K.

=== Higher National Diploma in Information Technology ===
The Higher National Diploma in Information Technology (HNDIT) program at the Sri Lanka Institute of Advanced Technological Education (SLIATE) was developed and commenced in 2000 with the objective of producing the middle level IT professional required for the new millennium. The students who meet the requirements in the Entry Profile will be selected through a selection test followed by an interview.The curriculum includes web programming and software development. Building applications using C#,Java,PHP and Laravel and SQL is focused in the programme. HNDIT course also focuses on Networking and Quality Assurance practices. Bootcamps are held by graduate students from SLIATE on Full Stack Development focusing developing web applications using MERN stack and frameworks like Tailwind and bootstrap.

=== Higher National Diploma in Agriculture ===
Objective of HND-AGRI course is to produce middle-level managers, who are capable of practicing appropriate technology and management tasks in crop and animal production, agro product processing and agribusiness and contributing to the socioeconomic and sustainable development of the agriculture sector locally and internationally, with professional attitudes and confidence to serve the local and global community. The students who meet the requirements in the Entry Profile will be selected through a selection test followed by an interview.

=== Higher National Diploma in Food Technology ===
The Higher National Diploma in Food Technology (HNDFT) programme at the Sri Lanka Institute of Advance Technological Education (SLIATE) was developed and introduced in 2012 with the objective of producing the middle level Food Technology professionals required for the new millennium. The students who meet the requirements in the Entry Profile will be selected through a selection test followed by an interview.

=== Higher National Diploma in Business Finance ===
National diploma in Business and Finance has been introduced in 1984 by the Board of Technology and Education Council in United Kingdom. The syllabi has been revised in 2004 and 2010 to meet the rapid changes in the business environment. It is a short term (two and half year English medium) course, which meets industrial requirements.

This Higher National Diploma in Business Finance aims to provide students with a foundation education in Business and Finance. The school also attempts to provide students with specialized knowledge in selected areas of study with accompanied technical skills in finance, management, and business strategy. In the process the programme tries to enable the students to develop analytical, logical, critical and problem-solving skills and personal attributes such as communication and presentation skills. The students who meet the requirements in the Entry Profile are selected through a selection test followed by an interview.

=== Higher National Diploma in Engineering ===
The Higher National Diploma Program in Engineering (HNDE) serves to convert the school leavers with specialized mathematical knowledge to middle level technologists who possess relevant Engineering capabilities. Therefore, the program is intended to provide a clear and adequate understanding about Engineering principles, practical applications and emerging necessities of changes and creative innovations in the specific area/field to move with time.

This program has been started under the Technical College, Ratmalana in 1986 and brought under the SLIATE in 1997. Since then, SLIATE has been conducting this program with the aim of creating Higher National Diploma Holders who are competent enough and equipped with modern technology in the disciplines of Civil, Mechanical & Electrical Engineering. The students who meet the requirements in the Entry Profile are selected through a selection test followed by an interview.

Currently, the HNDE program is offered at three locations: Mattakkuliya, Labuduwa, and Jaffna, providing students in these areas with opportunities to pursue higher-level technical education in engineering.

=== Higher National Diploma in English ===
The Higher National Diploma in English (HND in English) was primarily known as National Diploma in English (NDE) when it was initiated in Ceylon Technical College in 1995, which was later converted to the current course in 2000 with revisions to foster professional standards expected in a successful diplomat. The HND in English sets a platform for school leavers with G.C.E. Advanced Level qualification to develop their proficiency in English Language focusing mainly on reading, writing, listening and speaking skills and English literature parallel to developing personality, interpersonal skills and general transferable skills. The HND in English programme consists of two-year course work and a six-month full time training/project. There are three specialization areas namely, English Language Teaching Methodology, Journalism and Business English. Specializing in English Language Teaching Methodology requires completion of a six-month in-plant training and others can choose either in- plant training or project related to their specialized area. The curriculum revision of the HND in English takes place every four years to maintain the quality of the content. The students who meet the requirements in the Entry Profile are selected through a selection test followed by an interview.

=== Other Courses ===
1. HNDBA (Higher National Diploma in Business Administration)
2. HNDBF (Higher National Diploma in Business Finance)
3. HNDBSE (Higher National Diploma in Building Service Engineering)
4. HNDFT (Higher National Diploma in Food Technology)
5. HNDE (Higher National Diploma in English)
6. HNDIT (Higher National Diploma in Information Technology)
7. HNDM (Higher National Diploma in Management)
8. HNDT - Agri (Higher National Diploma in Technology)
9. HNDTHM (Higher National Diploma in Tourism and Hospitality Management)
10. HNDQS (Higher National Diploma in Quantity Survey)
11. HNDE (Higher National Diploma in Engineering - Civil / Electrical / Mechanical)

=== Renegotiation ===
In 1990, the Public Administration Circular 46/90 recognized the Higher National Diploma in Accountancy (HNDA) as equal to a Bachelor of Commerce degree programme which was repealed by the Rajapaksa administration. Following protests by students in 2015 after the Rajapaksa administration was defeated, the new administration reinstated the Public Administration Circular 46/90 giving HNDA degree equal status.
