= Gal Oya National Park =

National park in Sri Lanka

- IUCN category II (national park)
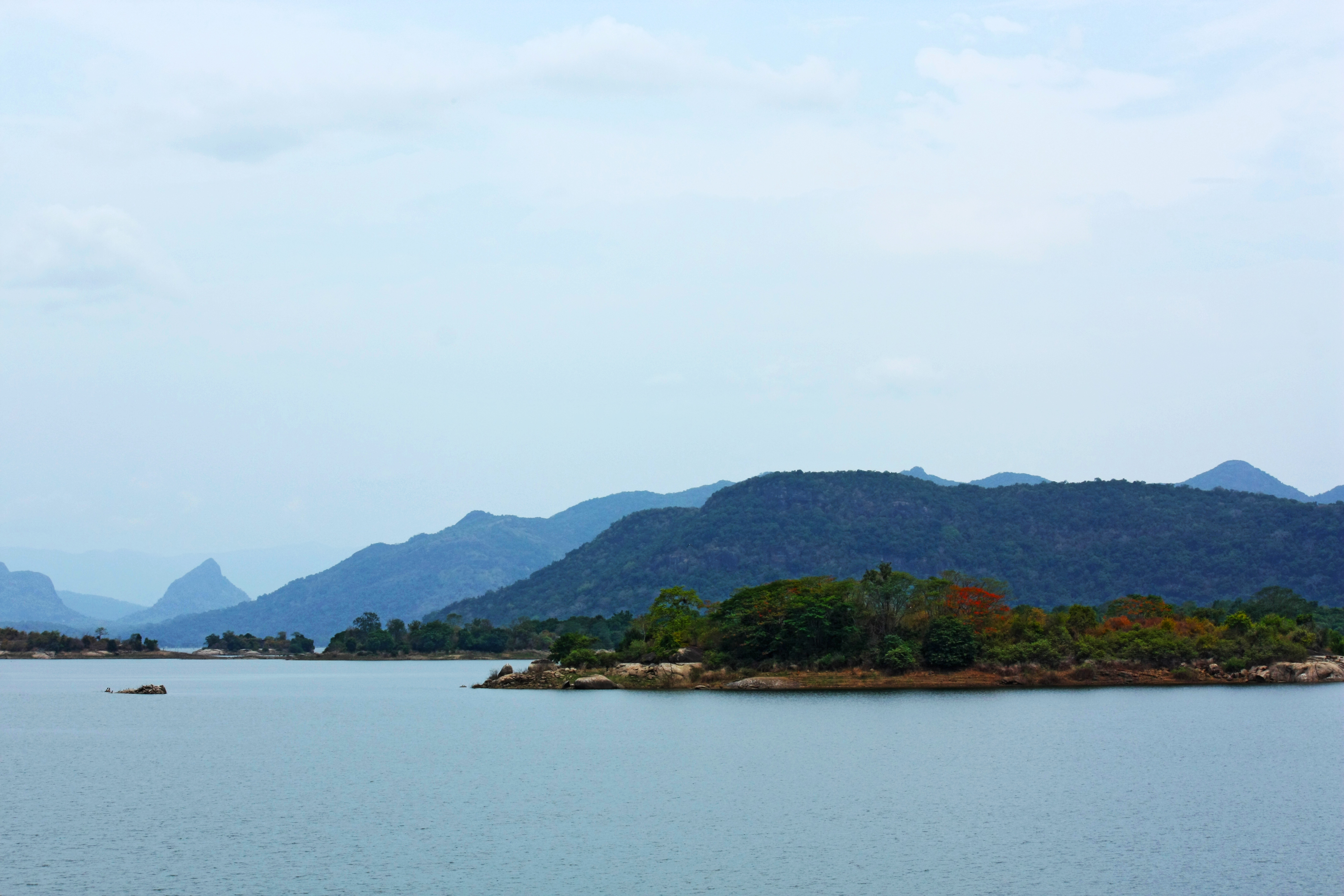
- Gal Oya National Park near Senanayake Samudraya

- Location within Sri Lanka
- Location: Uva and Eastern provinces, Sri Lanka
- Nearest city: Ampara
- Coordinates: 7°13′00″N 81°22′00″E
- Area: 25,900 ha (64,000 acres)
- Established: February 12, 1954
- Governing body: Department of Wildlife Conservation

Gal Oya National Park in Sri Lanka was established in 1954 and serves as the main catchment area for Senanayake Samudraya, the largest reservoir in Sri Lanka. Senanayake Samudraya was built under the Gal Oya development project by damming the Gal Oya at Inginiyagala in 1950. An important feature of the Gal Oya National Park is its elephant herd that can be seen throughout the year. Three important herbs of the Ayurveda medicine, triphala: Terminalia chebula, Terminalia bellirica and Emblica officinalis are amongst the notable flora of the forest. From 1954 to 1965 the park was administrated by the Gal Oya Development Board until the Department of Wildlife Conservation took over administration. The national park is situated 314 km (195 miles) from Colombo.

== Associated protected areas ==
The Gal Oya Development Board established several protected areas to protect the catchment areas of Senanayake Samudraya and several other reservoirs. This also helped to prevent the soil erosion caused by burning of the Thalawa grassland by the villagers. The protected areas established in 1954 are Gal Oya National Park, Senanayake Samudraya Sanctuary, Gal Oya valley north-east Sanctuary, and Gal Oya valley south-east Sanctuary. Together these four reserves accounts for 63,000 ha of land. Administration and protection of the four protected areas, reducing human-elephant clashes and enforcing the flora and fauna ordinance are amongst the duties of the department. Rangers are stationed at four sites: Inginiyagala, Mullegama, Nilgala and Baduluwela. Additionally in 1974 the Buddhangala Sanctuary was also designated. Buddhangala is a monastery with ruins of a stupa and other buildings in the nearby Malwattai area.

== Features ==
The elevation of the park varies from 30 m to about 900 m. Danigala, Nilgala, and Ulpotha are the mountains of the park. Rain is received during the North-eastern monsoon with average annual rainfall of 1,700 millimetres (66.93 in).

Crossing the Senanayake Samudraya by boat from Inginiyagala is an alternative method of accessing the National Park. Bird's Island in the reservoir is an island used by birds for nesting. Where Gal Oya falls to the reservoir, water flows in a natural tunnel known as Makara Kata (Sinhalese for dragon's mouth) or simply Makara. Thousands of pilgrims visit Dighavapi stupa annually which is also situated in the area. The stupa was built in the 2nd century BC on the site where Buddha is supposed to have meditated on his third visit to Sri Lanka. Danigala has a historic importance as it was the home to the Henebadde Veddas. A rock near the Henebedde cave contains Brahmi inscriptions.

== Flora and fauna ==
The vegetation of the forest is of three types: forest, shrub and grassland. The national park contains a substantial area of savannah grasslands known as thalawa in Sinhalese and mountainous grasslands known as pathana. Thalawa grassland is dominated by rough grass species, Cymbopogon nardus ("mana") and Imperata cylindrica ("iluk"). The burnt thalawa grasslands are known as the Damana grasslands and are used for cattle grazing by villagers. Rare plants of medicinal value such as Pterocarpus marsupium, Careya arborea, and Cassia fistula are also found in the forest. Berrya cordifolia, longan, Mangifera zeylanica, Diospyros spp., Ziziphus spp. and Mallotus repandus ("wal keppetiya") are the common floral species.

32 terrestrial mammals have been recorded in the park. The Sri Lankan elephant, Sri Lankan axis deer, muntjac, water buffalo, Sri Lankan sambar deer, Sri Lanka leopard, toque monkey and wild boar are among them. Included amongst the reptile species of the park are the mugger crocodile and star tortoise. More than 150 species of birds have been recorded in Gal Oya. The lesser adjutant, spot-billed pelican and red-faced malkoha are some of the park's resident birds. The Indian cormorant, Oriental darter, grey heron, and lesser whistling duck are among the common water birds of the Senanayake reservoir. The white-bellied sea eagle, and grey-headed fish eagle are the notable raptors of the area. Gal Oya National Park's butterfly species include the endemic lesser albatross.

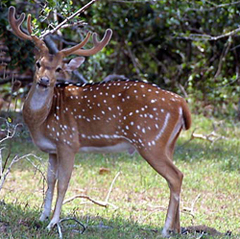
Sri Lankan axis deer

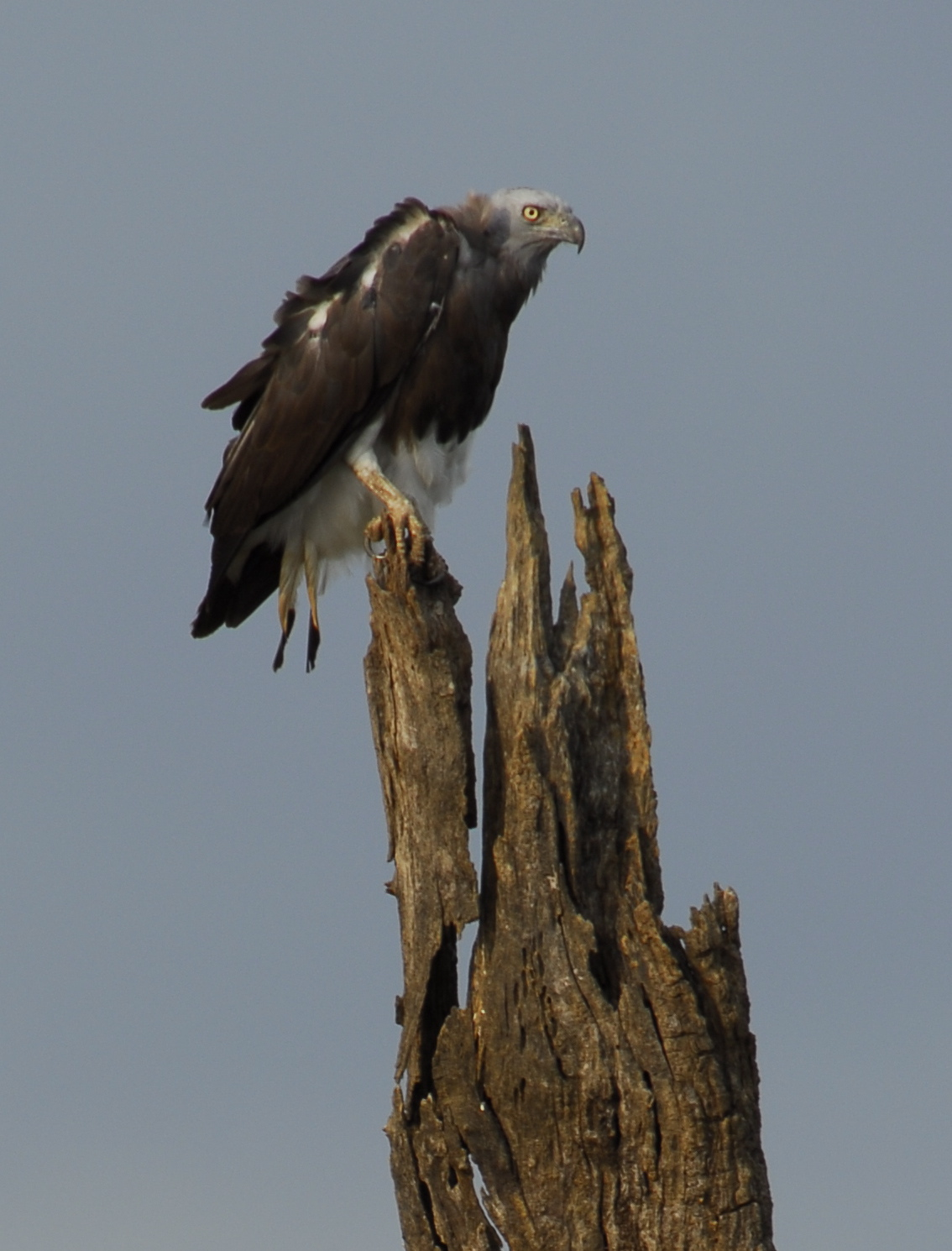
Grey-headed fish eagle

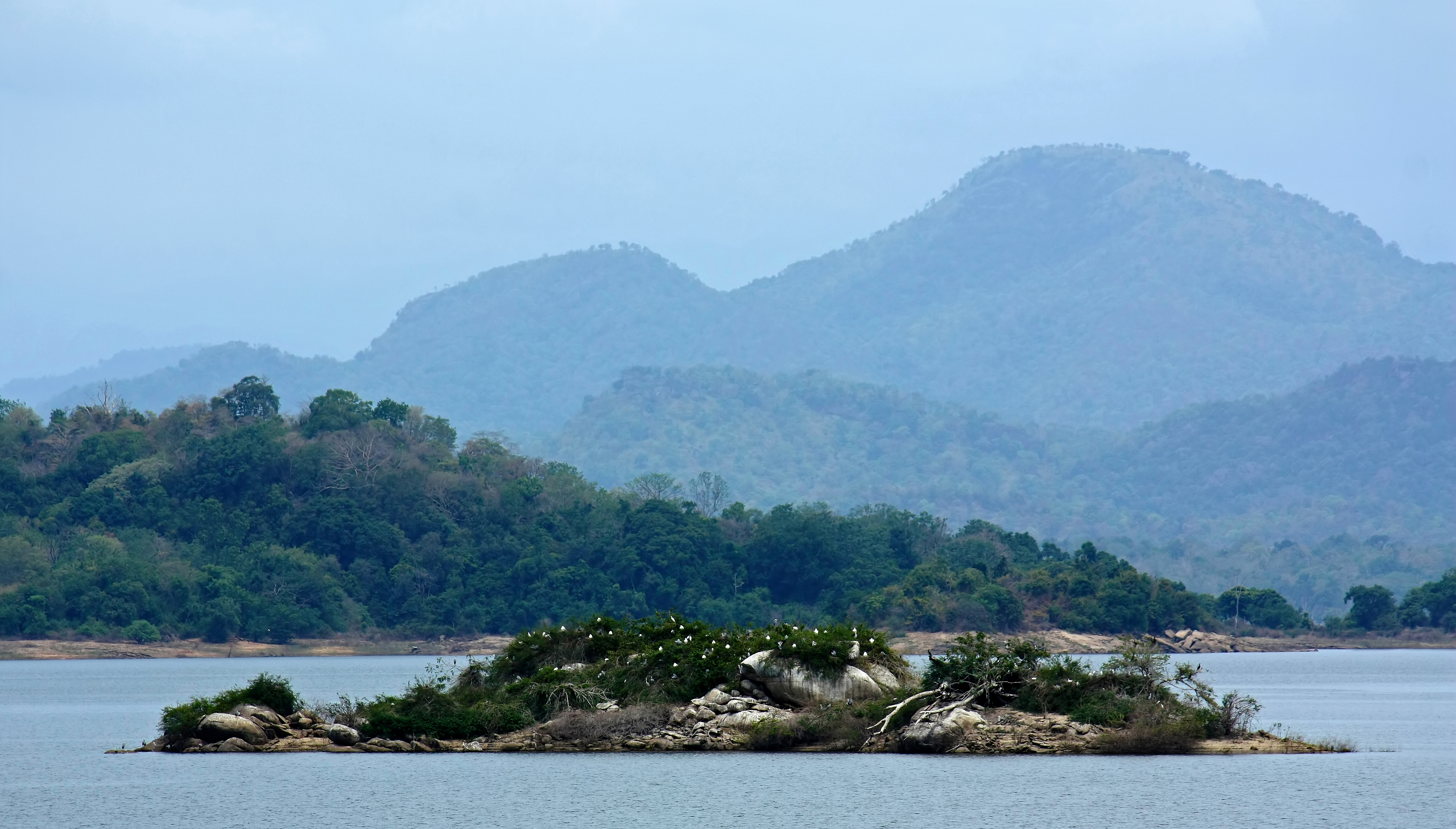
Herons, cormorants and other birds rest

== Threats and conservation ==
Illegal logging has cleared 30 acres (120,000 m^{2}) of the forest. Smuggling of medicinal plants also has been recorded. Inadequate ranger staff has made it difficult to prevent these crimes. The actions of the Department of Wildlife Conservation themselves came under criticism after the department failed to send a veterinary surgeon to attend an injured elephant. A jungle corridor has been proposed between Gal Oya and Maduru Oya National Parks.

== See also ==
- Gal Oya Dam
- Protected areas of Sri Lanka
