= Institution of Incorporated Engineers, Sri Lanka =

Engineering organization of Sri Lanka

The Institution of Incorporated Engineers, Sri Lanka (IIESL) was established in 1977 and incorporated by a Sri Lankan Act of Parliament. The institute registers engineering technologists and Incorporated Engineers under the Sydney Accord.

== History ==
Formed as the All Ceylon Engineering Diplomates Association in 1977, the society in 1992 changed to the Institute of Engineering Diplomates, Sri Lanka by an Act of Parliament, Act No 64 of 1992, registering all Engineering Diplomates. In 2000, it changed once again to Institution of Incorporated Engineers, Sri Lanka by an Act of Parliament, Act No 11 of 2000.

== Membership ==
- Hon. FIIE(SL) - Fellow of Institution of Incorporated Engineers, Sri Lanka
- FIIE(SL) - Fellow of Institution of Incorporated Engineers, Sri Lanka
- MIIE(SL) - Member of Institution of Incorporated Engineers, Sri Lanka
- AMIIE(SL) - Associate Member of Institution of Incorporated Engineers, Sri Lanka
- Student members

The following courses are entitled to membership:

- Higher National Diploma in Engineering (HNDE) - Sri Lanka Institute of Advanced Technological Education
- National Diploma in Technology (NDT) - Institute of Technology, University of Moratuwa
- National Diploma in Engineering Science (NDES) - Institute of Engineering Technology, Sri Lanka
- Diploma in Technology - Open University of Sri Lanka

== See also ==
- Engineering Council, Sri Lanka
- Institution of Engineers, Sri Lanka
