= Senanayake Samudraya =

Dam in Ampara District, Sri Lanka

- Location within Sri Lanka
- Country: Sri Lanka
- Location: Monaragala District
- Coordinates: 7.205544°N 81.473607°E
- Purpose: Irrigation
- Status: Operational
- Construction began: 24 August 1949
- Opening date: 1953; 73 years ago
- Owner: MIWRM

Dam and spillways
- Type of dam: Embankment dam
- Impounds: Gal Oya

Reservoir
- Creates: Senanayake Samudhraya
- Total capacity: 950,000,000 m3

Senanayake Samudraya (Sinhala: සේනානායක සමුද්‍රය, Tamil: சேனானாயக்க சமூத்ரய) is the largest reservoir in Sri Lanka. Locally known as "the sea" (Sinhala: සමුද්‍රය, romanized: samudraya, Tamil: கடல்), the reservoir was opened on 28 August 1949 under the Gal Oya Multipurpose Scheme, which was completed in 1953 by D. S. Senanayake.

== Gal Oya Dam ==
Senanayake Samudraya was formed by damming the Gal Oya river and other smaller rivers between a pair of mountains in Inginiyagala.

The reservoir is the largest and one of the most iconic reservoirs with an earthen dam built after receiving freedom from the British and was completed in 1953. The reservoir is sometimes referred to as "Inginiyagala Reservoir". The Senanayaka Samudraya is part of the Gal Oya multipurpose irrigation system project which started in the year 1949 and was completed in 1953 by the first prime minister of Sri Lanka, D. S. Senanayake.

== Tourism ==
The Senanayake Samudraya is the largest body of water ever created in Sri Lanka. Cradled between Siyambalanduwa and Ampara, the reservoir is bordered by the rising mountains of Inginiyagala. There is a national park near Senanayake Samudraya, known as the Gal Oya National Park, which is home to lots of wildlife, including more than 200 elephants, as well as bears and leopards. A development of the Gal Oya Project, the reservoir that irrigates the dry lands of the east of Sri Lanka, the lake attracts thousands of visitors annually.
