= Ceylon-German Technical Training Institute =

The Ceylon-German Technical Training Institute (also known as CGTTI or German Tech) is an engineering college located in Moratuwa, a suburb of Colombo, Sri Lanka. It is under the preview of the Ministry of Youth Affairs and Skills Development.

It was established in 1959 under an agreement made in 1958 between the Governments of the Federal Republic of Germany and Ceylon to supply training assistance in the maintenance of bus fleet, which belonged to the Ceylon Transport Board (CTB) and was located at the central workshops of the CTB at Werahera. In 1974, the institute was shifted to Moratuwa. CGTTI was under German management with a German Director until 1974, when the management was transferred to V.L.C (Larry) Perera who was appointed as the first Sri Lankan Director/Principal of the institute.
