= Jayantha Wattavidanage =

Jayantha Wattavidanage, is a limnologist, herpetologist and prominent molecular parasitologist in Sri Lanka. He is a well known zoologist in the country, where he has lot of media popularity. He is also a recipient of many research awards including the Presidential Award for his research publications.

He is a constant participant and resource provider in Doramadalawa TV program. He currently a senior lecturer in zoology at The Open University of Sri Lanka, since 1990.

Wattavidanage is the author of a large number of newspaper and magazine articles such as Rivira and Vidusara local newspapers and the narrator and contributor for the animal documentary Macro World which was telecasted on Swarnavahini. He also held the posts of chairman at the National Committee for Science Popularizing, National Science Foundation in Sri Lanka as well.

Wattavidanage graduated from University of Sri Jayewardenepura and took M.Phil. from the same university through limnology. He completed his PhD from University of Colombo in following years. His PhD research was based on molecular genetics of Malaria at University of Edinburgh, United Kingdom.

== Publications and co-publications ==
1. Bandarage, Gundya., Edirisinghe, E.A.D.N.D., Rajendra, J.C.N., Wattavidanage, Jayantha November 2015. Effectiveness of a modified version of peer-assisted study sessions in improving academic performance: An open and distance learning case study. Annual Academic Sessions of the Open University of Sri Lanka.

2. Tantrigoda, Ramani., Wattavidanage, Jayantha., Rajendra, J.C.N., Bandarage, Gundya. November 2014. Making "Significant Others" partners in motivating freshman of the B.Sc. Degree programme at the Open University of Sri Lanka:A preliminary study.

3. Madhava, W - Botejue, S - Wattavidanage, Jayantha 2011. Herpetofaunal diversity and distribution in Kalugala proposed forest reserve, Western province of Sri Lanka p. 65-80.

4. Perera, Palinda., Burt, Peter., Amarasekera, H. S., Wattavidanage, Jayantha. Distribution, ecology and morphology of a newly discovered Poecilotheria species of Sri Lanka (Araneae - Theraphosidae).
