= W. T. I. Alagaratnam =

W. T. I. Alagaratnam OBE, MICE, MIWE
- Born: 12 March 1895
- Died: 1977
- Occupation: Civil engineer

Winslow Thambiah Ivers Alagaratnam, OBE, MICE, MIWE (12 March 1895 – 1977) was a leading Ceylon Tamil civil engineer and Director of Irrigation in Ceylon.

== Early life ==
Alagaratnam was born on 12 March 1895. He was educated in British Ceylon before going to Madras from where he obtained a degree in civil engineering.

Alagaratnam married Daisy Anketell. They had three daughters - Chandra, Pathmini and Kamalini.

== Career ==
After graduating Alagaratnam returned to Ceylon and joined the Irrigation Department in 1921 as an Assistant Irrigation Engineer. He was the first qualified Ceylonese engineer to join the department. In 1934 he became the first Ceylonese to be appointed Irrigation Engineer. He was promoted to Divisional Engineer in 1943. In 1952 he became the first Ceylonese to be appointed Director of Irrigation. He held the post until his retirement in 1955. Alagaratnam later served as Director of the Water Resources Board.

In the 1954 New Year Honours Alagaratnam was made an Officer of the Order of the British Empire.

Alagaratnam died in 1977.
