= Technical College Balapitiya =

The Technical College Balapitiya is situated in Balapitiya, Galle District, Sri Lanka. Established in 1982, the college is managed by the Department of Technical Education and Training.

== Expansion ==
Hilfswerk Austria, in 2007, donated a fully equipped building, to the college, that included two libraries and a computer laboratory. The cost was Rs. 20 million. A solar powered Electrical and Computer Laboratory was opened on 29 July 2011. It had been designed and project managed as part of the Korea International Cooperation Agency programme.
