= Hardy Advanced Technological Institute =

Engineering college in Ampara, Sri Lanka

The Hardy University College (also known as Hardy Advanced Technological Institute ) is an engineering college located in Ampara, Sri Lanka.

Founded in 1956 by Prof. Allen Hardy as the Technical Training Institute with aid from the Colombo Plan, Food and Agriculture Organization (FAO) and the Asia Foundation, it was renamed as Hardy Senior Technical Institute (HSTI) in 1967. The institute carried out National Diploma in Technology course until it was transferred to Institute of Technology of the University of Moratuwa.
