= Gal Oya Dam =

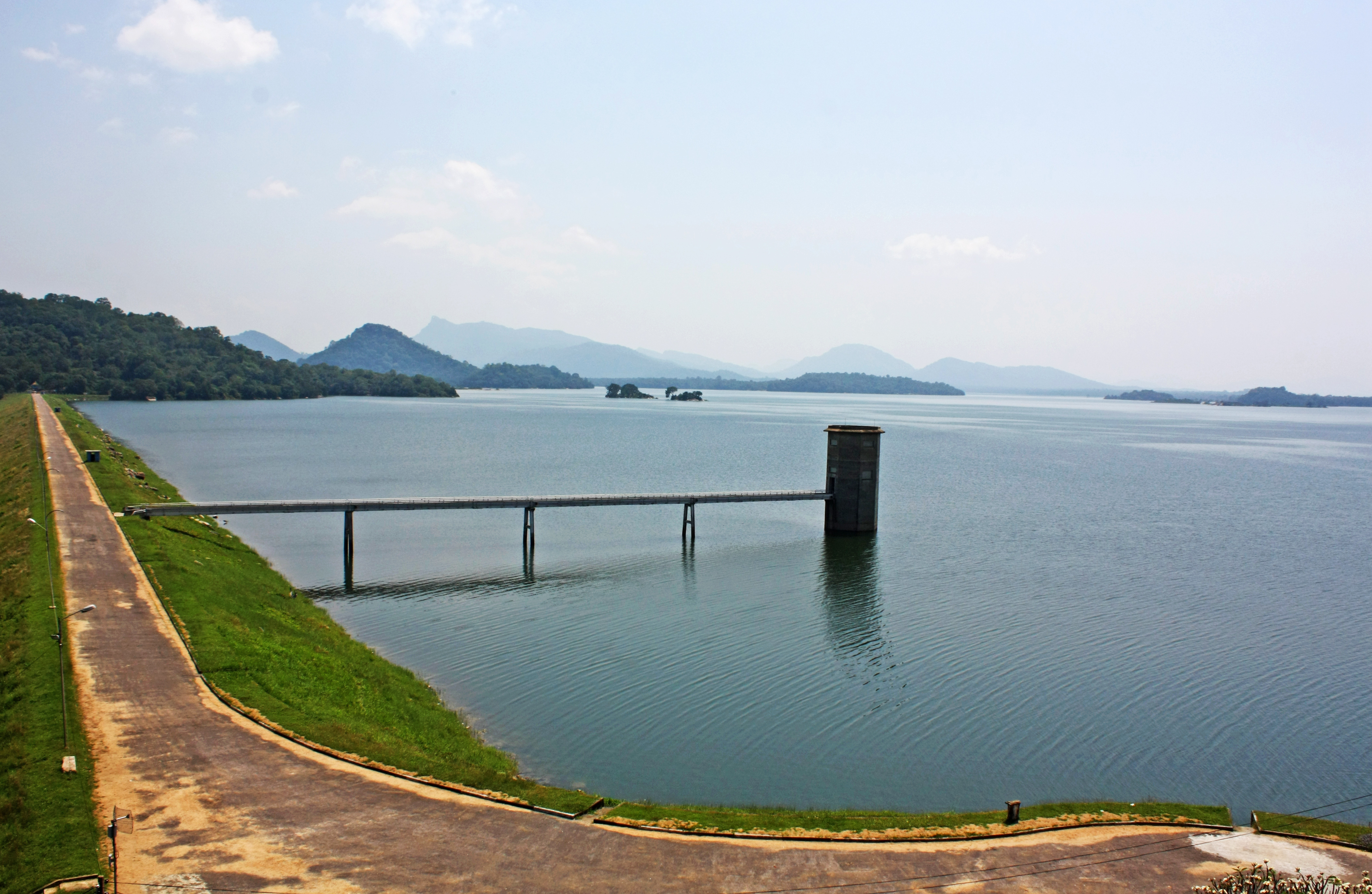
- Gal Oya dam in Senanayake Samudhraya

- Location within Sri Lanka
- Country: Sri Lanka
- Location: Gal Oya National Park
- Coordinates: 07°12′37″N 81°32′10″E
- Purpose: Irrigation, Power
- Status: Operational
- Construction began: August 24, 1949
- Opening date: 1953
- Owner: MIWRM

Dam and spillways
- Type of dam: Embankment dam
- Impounds: Gal Oya
- Height (thalweg): 140 ft (43 m)
- Length: 3,600 ft (1,100 m)
- Dam volume: 2,000,000 cu yd (1,500,000 m^{3})

Reservoir
- Creates: Senanayake Samudraya
- Total capacity: 770,000 acre⋅ft (950,000,000 m^{3})
- Surface area: 35 mi^{2} (91 km^{2})

Inginiyagala Power Station
- Coordinates: 07°12′51″N 81°32′14″E
- Operator: Ceylon Electricity Board
- Commission date: June 1963
- Type: Conventional
- Installed capacity: 11 MW

The Gal Oya Dam (also known as Inginiyagala Dam) is an embankment dam in the Uva Province of Sri Lanka. The dam creates one of the largest reservoirs in the country, the Gal Oya Reservoir. Water from the reservoir is used primarily for irrigation in the Uva and Eastern provinces, in addition to powering a small hydroelectric power station. Construction of the dam and reservoir began in August 24, 1949, completing four years later in 1953.

== Dam and reservoir ==
The dam is constructed between two hills at the small town of Inginiyagala, measuring 3,600 ft (1,100 m) and 140 ft (43 m) in length and height respectively, consisting of 2,000,000 cu yd (1,500,000 m^{3}) of soil. The dam, built by Morrison-Knudsen company, creates the Gal Oya Reservoir.

The reservoir, also known as the Inginiyagala Reservoir, and more commonly as the Senanayake Samudraya (after D.S. Senanayake), has a total storage capacity of 770,000 acre⋅ft (950,000,000 m^{3}) and a surface area of 35 mi^{2} (91 km^{2}).

== Power station ==
In addition to downstream irrigation, water from the reservoir is used to power the Inginiyagala Power Station, a hydroelectric power station located immediately downstream of the dam. The power station consists of four units of (2.475MWx2 & 3.15MWx2)11.25 MW, commissioned in 1952 unit 1,2 & 1962 unit 3,4.

== See also ==
- Electricity in Sri Lanka
- Gal Oya National Park
- List of dams and reservoirs in Sri Lanka
- List of power stations in Sri Lanka
