= Ampara =

Ampara අම්පාර அம்பாறை
- Town
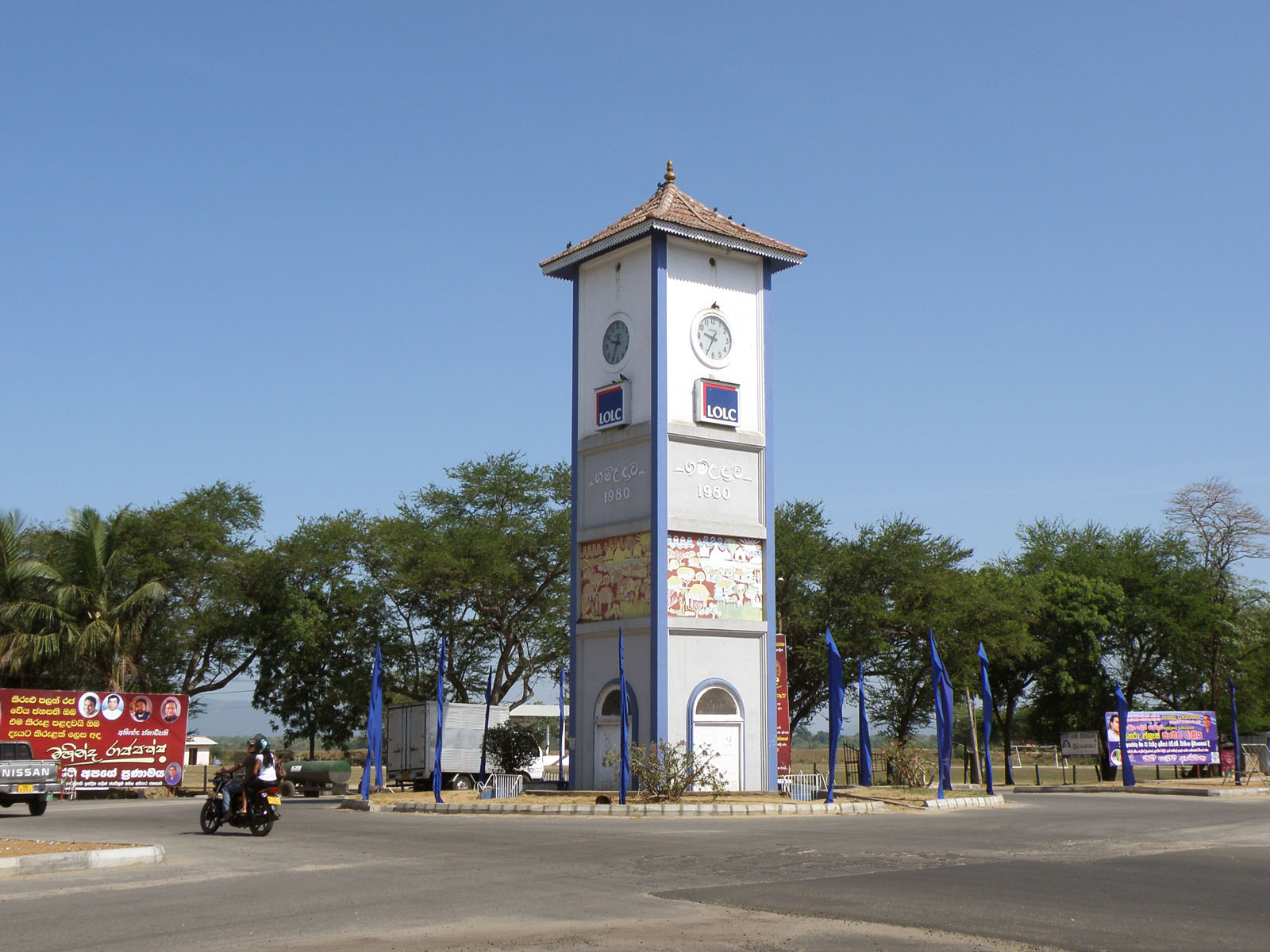
- Ampara Clock Tower

- Location within Sri Lanka
- Coordinates: 7°17′0″N 81°40′0″E
- Country: Sri Lanka
- Province: Eastern
- District: Ampara

Government
  - Type: Urban Council

Population (2024)
  - Total: 47,868
- Time zone: UTC+5:30 (Sri Lanka Standard Time Zone)

Ampara (Sinhala: අම්පාර, Tamil: அம்பாறை) is a town in Eastern Province, Sri Lanka. Located along the eastern coast of Sri Lanka, it serves as the capital of the Ampara District. The modern town of Ampara was established in the early 1950s during the construction of the Inginiyagala Dam. According to the 2024 census, the town had a population of 47,868.

== History ==
Ampara is inhabited since the time of Buddha. It was known as Ambarapiti Gardens and was a populated town during the rule of the Kingdom of Anuradhapura during the second century BCE.

During the British colonial period, Ampara was a small settlement in the Batticaloa district, and served as a resting place for hunters in the late 19th and early 20th centuries. The Gal Oya Project was launched in 1949 by the Government of Sri Lanka led by Prime Minister D. S. Senanayake. The scheme involved the construction of the Senanayake Samudraya. Ampara was initially developed as a settlement for housing the construction workers of the Inginiyagala Dam. Later, it became the main administrative and urban center in the Gal Oya Valley. The town was planned in 1954 by the Russian R. Rozwadowski. Ampara District was created in April 1961, and was expanded to include Ampara.

== Geography and administration ==
Ampara is the capital of Ampara District, in the Eastern Province of Sri Lanka. Located on the eastern coast of Sri Lanka, about 350 km (220 mi) from Colombo, the town is spread over an area of 133.8 km^{2} (51.7 sq mi). The town is located within the Ampara Divisional Secretariat Division and is administered by the Ampara Urban Council. A portion of the municipal area is part of the Gal Oya National Park.

=== Climate ===
The maximum temperature ranges from 39 °C (102 °F) in the summer to 29 °C (84 °F) in the winter, with an average of 32 °C (90 °F). The town receives most of the rainfall from the Northeast monsoon from October to February. It receives an average precipitation of 140 cm (55 in) annually. Most of the remaining months are dry.

== Demographics ==
According to the 2012 census, Ampara had a population of 43,829 inhabitants. The 2024 census recored a population of 47,868, comprising 23,103 males and 24,765 females. While the district is ethnically and religiously diverse, comprising Sinhalese, Sri Lankan Moors, and Sri Lankan Tamils, the town itself is populated majorly by the Sinhalese (98.9%) with Tamils and Moors contributing the majority of the remaining population. Buddhism is the major religion with 97.9% of the population adhering to it.
