= Engineering Council, Sri Lanka =

Engineering Council of Sri Lanka
- Formation: 2017
- Type: Statutory body
- Purpose: Sri Lankan regulatory body for the Engineering profession
- Headquarters: Engineering Council, 4th Floor, Irrigation Department Premises, 230, Bauddhaloka Mawatha, Colombo 07, Sri Lanka.
- Coordinates: 6°54′00″N 79°52′00″E
- Region served: Sri Lanka
- Members: ~20,000
- Official language: Sinhala, English, Tamil
- Chairman: W.T.R. De Silva
- Main organ: Council Board
- Affiliations: Institution of Engineers, Sri Lanka, Institution of Incorporated Engineers, Sri Lanka, University of Ruhuna, University of Moratuwa and Faculty of Engineering, University of Peradeniya
- Website: https://www.ecsl.lk/

The Engineering Council of Sri Lanka is Sri Lanka's regulatory authority for registration of engineering practitioners. It was formed under the Engineering Council Act No 4 of 2017. Engineering Council Act was passed by the Parliament of Sri Lanka with the support of Eng. Champika Ranawaka All engineering practitioners in Sri Lanka needs to be registered with the engineering council to practice. Failing to do so would result in an offence and can be convicted by a summary trial before a Magistrate with imprisonment period not exceeding one year and/or a fine not exceeding one hundred thousand.

== Functions ==
The functions of the Engineering Council, Sri Lanka are;

- Registering engineering practitioners under the categories of;
  - Chartered Engineer (CEng) - Chartered Engineer of the Institution of Engineers, Sri Lanka (IESL)
  - Associate Engineer (AEng) - Four year Full-time degree in Engineering recognized by IESL or an Associate Member of IESL
  - Affiliate Engineer (AflEng) - Three year full-time degree in Engineering recognized by IESL
  - Incorporated Engineer (IEng) - Incorporated Engineer of the Institution of Incorporated Engineers, Sri Lanka (IIESL)
  - Engineering Diplomate (EngDip) - Diploma in Engineering from a recognized University or Technical or Technological Institute recognized by IIESL
  - Engineering Technician (EngTec) - National Vocational Qualification Level IV of Engineering Technology or equivalent qualification recognized by the Tertiary and Vocational Education Commission or one year full-time academic course in Engineering Technology and has gained one year industrial experience in the relevant field or a holder of a Diploma or Certificate in Technology by a University or a Technical or Technological Institute of the Government of Sri Lanka
- Determine the remuneration payable to the staff of the council
- Make representations to the Government and relevant bodies on matters relating the engineering profession in Sri Lanka.

== Council members ==
Council is headed by a Chairmen appointed by the subject minister from among the members of the council which is made up of;

- Ex-officio members
  - Dean of the Faculty of Engineering, University of Peradeniya or representative of the rank of Professor
  - Dean of the Faculty of Engineering, University of Moratuwa or representative of the rank of Professor
  - Dean of the Faculty of Engineering, University of Ruhuna or representative of the rank of Professor
  - Director General of Tertiary and Vocational Education Commission or representative
- Appointed members
  - Seven Chartered Engineers nominated by the IESL.
  - Four members nominated by the IIESL.
  - Two Chartered Engineers nominated by the Sri Lanka Engineering Service.

== Criticism ==
The Engineering Council has been criticized on its susceptibility to government influence and domination by the IESL with majority of the council are its members. It is criticized for allowing only the IESL and IIESL to submit its members for registration as engineering practitioners. Thereby allowing both institutions with IESL ability to control registration of engineering practitioners. IESL has been criticized in the past for restricting registration of Chartered Engineers having suspended the mature candidate route for non graduate engineers. The Engineering Council Act No 4 of 2017 will prevent many foreign qualified engineers from continuing their practice. Engineering graduates from newly established engineering faculties and private universities are not recognized and are not allowed to practice. However graduate diploma holders of the IESL owned IESL College of Engineering can practice as Associate Engineer as they are entitled to Associate Membership of IESL.

== See also ==
- Engineering Council
