= Institution of Engineers, Sri Lanka =

Sri Lankan professional institution

The Institution of Engineers, Sri Lanka
- Abbreviation: IESL
- Predecessor: Engineering Association of Ceylon
- Formation: 1906
- Founded at: Anuradhapura
- Legal status: Active
- Headquarters: 120/15, Wijerama Mawatha, Colombo 07
- Fields: Engineering
- President: Eng. Kosala Kamburadeniya
- Elected President: Eng. Prabodha Jinasena
- Vice President: Eng. Mangala Silva
- Website: www.iesl.lk

The Institution of Engineers, Sri Lanka (IESL) is a multidisciplinary professional engineering institution in Sri Lanka.

== History ==
1906 saw the birth of the Engineering Association of Ceylon.

Presided by the Governor of Ceylon Sir Henry Blake, the inauguration of the Association was held on the January 6th 1906 within the hallowed precincts of the Legislative Council of Chambers. The then Head of State, the Governor was made Patron of the Association - a tradition that continues to date where the Head of State remains the Patron. F A Cooper was appointed Founder President.

From 1956 however, a series of chapters began unfolding for the Association. Those chapters began with a name change, in which the Association was established as the Institution of Engineers, Ceylon. It was in 1968 that the Association bore a name change.

The Institution was incorporated by Act of Parliament No 17 of 1968 as the Institute of Engineers, Ceylon. When in 1972, the country itself changed its name to reflect its historic annals and eastern roots to become a republic, the Institution of Engineers adopted Sri Lanka to replace Ceylon.

In 1996, this name was ratified by the Amendment to the Act No 3 of 1996. This heralded a renaming to the Institution of Engineers Sri Lanka.

== Membership ==
IESL offers several categories of membership, including:

- Student Member
- Graduate Member
- Associate Member (AMIE)
- Chartered Engineer (CEng)

These memberships recognize different levels of academic qualification and professional experience.

Corporate Member grades

- Fellow - FIE (Sri Lanka)
- Member - MIE (Sri Lanka)

Non-corporate Member grades

- Associate Member - AMIE (Sri Lanka)
- Affiliate Member - AflMIE (Sri Lanka)
- Associate
- Companion
- Student Member

https://www.iesl.lk/index.php?option=com_content&view=article&id=140&Itemid=417&lang=en

== Washington Accord ==
In June 2014, the IESL was admitted to the Washington Accord, on a unanimous decision made by the signatory countries at the 2014 International Engineering Meetings held in Wellington New Zealand. Sri Lanka now becomes the sixteenth signatory to this Accord, joining Australia, Canada, Ireland, the US, UK, New Zealand, Russia, South Africa, Japan, South Korea, Hong Kong, China, Taiwan, Malaysia, Singapore and Turkey as a Washington Accord Signatory Country.

- CEng (Sri Lanka) is used in Sri Lanka as a post-nominal abbreviation by Corporate Members of the Institution of Engineers, Sri Lanka (IESL).
- PEng (Sri Lanka) is used in Sri Lanka as a post-nominal abbreviation by Members who are registered as Professional Engineers with the Institution of Engineers, Sri Lanka (IESL).
- IntPE (Sri Lanka) is used in Sri Lanka as a post-nominal abbreviation by Members whose names have been entered in the International Register of Professional Engineers for Sri Lanka maintained by the Institution of Engineers, Sri Lanka (IESL).

== Controversies ==
=== Engineering Council of Sri Lanka ===
In 2017, the IESL sponsored legislation through parliament to establish the Engineering Council of Sri Lanka. Engineering Council has been criticized on its susceptibility to government influence and domination by the IESL with majority of the council are its members. It is criticized for allowing only the IESL and IIESL to submit its members for registration as engineering practitioners. Thereby allowing both institutions with IESL ability to control registration of engineering practitioners. IESL has been criticized in the past for restricting registration of Chartered Engineers having suspended the mature candidate route for non graduate engineers. With the formation of the Engineering Council foreign qualified engineers have become effectively excluded from practicing in Sri Lanka. Thereby establishing a monopoly for IESL graduate engineers in the island.

=== Singapore - Sri Lanka Free Trade Agreement ===
In 2018, IESL along with the GMOA has objected and criticized the Government of Sri Lanka for entering into a Free Trade Agreement with Singapore. Known as the Singapore - Sri Lanka Free Trade Agreement (SSLTA), IESL claims have liberalized the services sector affecting the practices of local professionals such as engineers forcing them to compete with service sector companies from Singapore, which offer better quality services at lower rates than local professionals or organizations.

== Council (2025–2026) ==
The Council of the Institution of Engineers, Sri Lanka (IESL) for the 2025–2026 session is headed by President Eng. Kosala Kamburadeniya. The principal office bearers are:

- President – Eng. Kosala Kamburadeniya
- President-Elect – Eng. Prabodha Jinasena
- Immediate Past President – Eng. Granie R. Jayalath
- Past President – Eng. (Dr.) Kamal Laksiri
- Vice Presidents – Eng. Samantha Gunawardana, Eng. Mangala Silva (Born 3rd October 1976 in Kalutara), and Eng. M. G. Hemachandra
- Honorary Secretary – Eng. Suran Fernando
- Honorary Treasurer – Eng. Manjula Samarasinghe

The Council also includes the chairpersons of the Institution's sectional committees representing Agricultural and Plantation Engineering, Building Services Engineering, Chemical and Process Engineering, Civil Engineering, Electrical, Electronics and Telecommunication Engineering, Information Technology and Computer Engineering, and Mechanical Engineering, together with elected representatives of the Fellow and Member grades.

== See also ==
- Institution of Incorporated Engineers, Sri Lanka
