= Vaughan Allison =

Japanese coffee personality (born 1983)

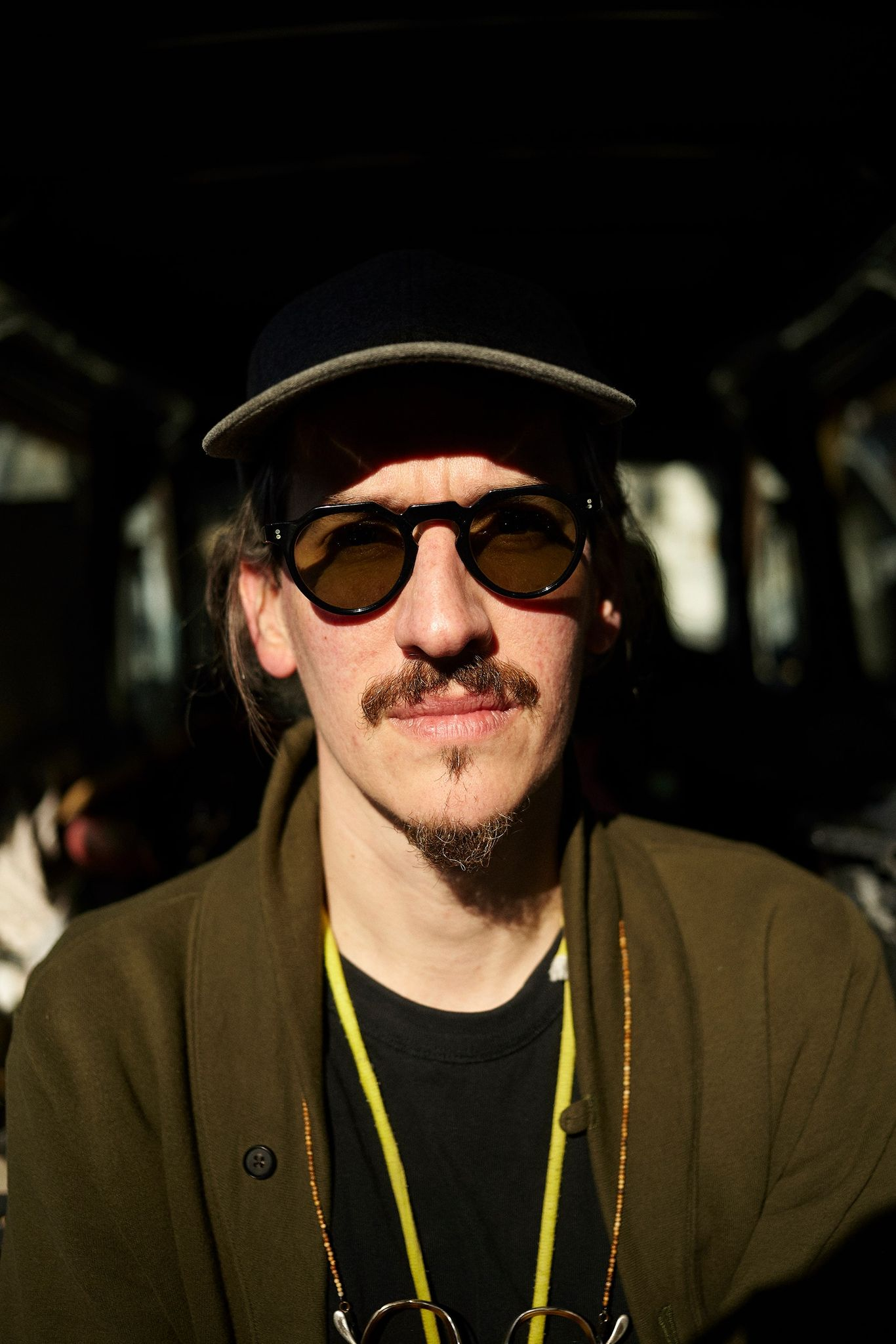

Vaughan Allison (born 1983) is a cafe owner, model, teacher, music promoter, and coffee personality based in Tokyo, Japan. He is best known for his work touring international artists throughout Japan, writing about coffee and modeling and for co-founding Mia Mia cafe in Higashi Nagasaki.

== Early life ==
Vaughan was born on February 11, 1983, at Saint Vincent's Private Hospital in Melbourne, where he grew up with his parents and brother, musician Martin Martini.

He first came to Japan in 2001, where he studied an accelerated program at Ritsumeikan Asia Pacific University where he obtained a Bachelor of Business Administration and graduated in 2003.

== Career ==
In 2003 Vaughan returned to Australia and started his own music management company Red Balloon Artist Management. Through Red Balloon Artist Management, worked with his brother's outfit Martin Martini and The Bone Palace Orchestra, which saw the team go on three Australian national tours, make appearances at the Corner Hotel, National Gallery of Victoria, Sydney Opera House, and perform an overseas season at London's Soho Theatre in 2008. In 2009 he returned to Japan and started working in the music industry, modeling and teaching at Tokyo fashion college Bunka.

=== Music industry ===
His work as a promoter and booker has seen him tour various Australian artists throughout Japan, including The Lagerphones, Grand Salvo, The Twoks, The Harpoons, Sunnyside (who played Fuji Rock 2019), Owl Eyes, and Oliver Mann.

He has also worked as an on-site, Japan-based fixer for artists such as Hiatus Kaiyote and Blue King Brown, among others, and booked a debut Australia tour for Kyoto outfit Zahatorte in 2019.

=== Coffee industry ===
Vaughan has long been a member of Tokyo's coffee community.

As a writer and curator, he's promoted various coffee shops and baristas through multiple media channels, including Casa BRUTUS Magazine and online media like lifestyle web magazine Harumari and Signpost, where he published pieces on Koffee MameyaA and Chatei Hatou. Vaughan was also invited to curate and write the Tokyo City Profile for specialty coffee magazine Standart.

Working with Good Coffee online magazine, he built the @goodcoffeeme Instagram's following from 100 to 50,000 followers in three years. He was also one of the Tokyo Coffee Festival's key members - producing the 2018 spring festival, which was one of the most attended (40,000 attendees over two days) Tokyo Coffee Festivals in history.

In 2016, Vaughan released a limited edition book.

He worked with Miki Suzuki as her English coach during her time at the World Barista Championship in Seoul in 2017, in which she placed 2nd in the world. He's also been the emcee at the Latte Art Championships in 2018 and 2019, as well as a judge at other competitions like the Tokyo Matcha Latte Art Competition in 2019.

=== Modeling ===
As a model, Vaughan has worked with Wrangler, Kishin Shinoyama, Tomoki Sukezane, Uniqlo UT (wearing Jean-Michel Basquiat), Takashi Kumagai, and Kashiyama. He's made regular appearances in magazines such as UOMO, Houyhnhnm, Brutus, Popeye, Tokyo Calendar, and Fukuoka's Bond Magazine. He has done catalog work for Beams, United Arrows, Urban Research, Phlannel and Espionage (Korea), promotional work for Zoff, and mobile phone company au. Since 2013 he's worked as a lecturer at Bunka Fashion College.
