= University of Moratuwa =

University in Sri Lanka

Coordinates: 06°47′42″N 79°54′03″E

- මොරටුව විශ්වවිද්‍යාලය மொறட்டுவைப் பல்கலைக்கழகம்
- The emblem of University of Moratuwa
- Former name: Katubedda Campus of University of Ceylon
- Motto: Sanskrit: विद्ययेव सर्वधनम् (Vidyayeva Sarvadhanam)
- Motto in English: Wisdom is all Wealth
- Type: Public
- Established: 1972; 54 years ago
- Accreditation: University Grants Commission (Sri Lanka)
- Affiliations: University Grants Commission; Association of Commonwealth Universities; International Association of Universities; Royal Institution of Chartered Surveyors; RIBA; Institution of Engineers Australia; Institution of Engineering and Technology; Kalutara Teaching Hospital
- Chancellor: Monte Cassim
- Vice-Chancellor: N. D. Gunawardena
- Academic staff: 500
- Administrative staff: 800
- Students: 11,000+
- Undergraduates: 9,000
- Postgraduates: 2,500
- Location: Katubedda, Moratuwa, Sri Lanka
- Campus: Urban - 10 ha (25 acres)
- Nickname: Mora
- Website: uom.lk

The University of Moratuwa (also referred as Moratuwa University) (Sinhala: මොරටුව විශ්වවිද්‍යාලය Moraṭuwa Wiśwawidyālaya, Tamil: மொறட்டுவைப் பல்கலைக்கழகம்) is a public university in Sri Lanka. It is located on the bank of the Bolgoda Lake in Katubedda, Moratuwa, a suburb of Sri Lanka's capital Colombo. It is the most acclaimed and prestigious university in Sri Lanka for engineering.

Apart from academics including undergraduate and postgraduate studies, the University of Moratuwa presents social and cultural activities, student services, societies, and sports and recreational activities. The institution was known as Ceylon College of Technology, Katubedda (Katubedda Tech) before gaining university status. Its roots go back to the Institute of Practical Technology founded in 1960 to provide technical education.

== History ==
The University of Moratuwa is an independent state university in Katubedda, Moratuwa, Sri Lanka overlooking Bolgoda Lake. It was established as the University of Moratuwa (UoM), Sri Lanka on 22 December 1978 under the Universities Act No. 16 of 1978 and operates under the general direction of the University Grants Commission. Its origin can be traced to the Government Technical College (GTC) which was established in Maradana, Colombo in 1893.

The GTC was one of the first institutions for formal technical education in Sri Lanka (the Ceylon Medical School was established in 1870, followed by Colombo Law College (1875), School of Agriculture (1884) and the Government Technical College (1893)). It became the pioneering institution for science education in Sri Lanka and its name was changed to the Ceylon Technical College (CTC) in 1906. The CTC provided technical education in civil, electrical and mechanical engineering fields even before the establishment of the University College Colombo, affiliated to the University of London, in 1921.

The Ceylon Technical College, Katubedda was established in 1966 offering the Diploma in Technology, it gained University status, as the Katubedda Campus of the single University of Ceylon, on 15 February 1972. The Department of Architecture, then at Colombo, was transferred to Katubedda in the formation of this new campus. The Katubedda Campus thus began with one faculty, that of Engineering and Architecture. The first president was Dr. LH Sumanadasa who steered the progress of the institution and was the principal of the IPT before it became the Katubedda Campus. When Ceylon became a Republic on 22 May 1972, the corporate name of the university was changed to the University of Sri Lanka.

In 1978, it gained the Independent University Status under Universities Act No. 16 of 1978.

Students from the University of Moratuwa have participated in Google Summer of Code every year since 2007, Imagine Cup Sri Lanka, and IEEEXtreme Competition. In the Google Summer of Code, University of Moratuwa was ranked as the top university worldwide in the number of awards received by students for the five-year period from its inception in 2005.

The University of Moratuwa won the Microsoft Imagine Cup Sri Lankan Software Design Finals in five out of eight occasions, including 2005, 2006, 2007, 2008 and 2012. In addition to this, the university regularly participates in the world stage of competitions such as the CFA Institute Research Challenge and the CIMA Global Business Challenge.

== Faculties and academic entities ==
=== Faculty of Engineering ===
This is the largest faculty in the University of Moratuwa, comprising eleven academic departments, over 200 academic staff and around 4000 undergraduate and thousands of post-graduate students. The engineering programs are accredited under the Washington Accord since 2007.The faculty offers the Bachelor of the Science of Engineering in ten disciplines, and the Bachelor of Design in Fashion Design and Product Development. In addition, the Faculty offers a large number of post-graduate degrees in varied engineering and allied disciplines.

The Departments at the Faculty of Engineering are:

- Department of Chemical & Process Engineering
- Department of Civil Engineering
- Department of Computer Science & Engineering
- Department of Earth Resources Engineering
- Department of Electrical Engineering
- Department of Electronic & Telecommunication Engineering
- Department of Materials Science & Engineering
- Department of Mechanical Engineering
- Department of Textile & Clothing Engineering
- Department of Transport & Logistics

The following departments do not have dedicated students; they support the academic activities of other departments by offering subjects to engineering undergraduates from all fields.

- Department of Mathematics

The divisions and units at the Faculty of Engineering are

- Undergraduate Studies Division
- Postgraduate Studies Division
- Industrial Training Division
- Engineering Research Unit (ERU)
- Engineering Faculty Quality Assurance Cell

=== Faculty of Architecture ===
The Faculty of Architecture is the only seat of education in Sri Lanka offering undergraduate and postgraduate degrees in Architecture, Town and Country Planning, and Facilities Management and Quantity Surveying. It comprises five departments: the departments of Architecture, Building Economics, Integrated Design, Town and Country Planning, and Facilities Management. The divisions and units of the Faculty are the Undergraduate Studies Division, the Postgraduate Studies Division, Faculty of Architecture Research Unit (FARU), and the Faculty of Architecture Quality Assurance Cell. The divisions and units above are established to provide training and research for academics and professionals.

The Faculty of Architecture offers six Honours Degrees:

- Bachelor of Architecture
- Bachelor of Landscape Architecture
- Bachelor of Design
- Bachelor of Science in Quantity Surveying
- Bachelor of Science in Facilities Management
- Bachelor of Science in Town and Country Planning

The Faculty also offers eight Postgraduate degrees:

- MSc/PG Diploma in Interior Design
- MSc in Landscape Design
- MSc in Architectural Conservation of Monuments and Sites (ACOMAS)
- Master of Urban Design
- MSc in Project Management
- MSc/PG Diploma in Construction Law and Dispute Resolution
- MSc in Occupational Safety and Health Management
- MSc in Spatial Planning, Management and Design

=== Faculty of Information Technology ===
The Faculty of Information Technology was established in June 2001 to address the widening gap in the supply of IT professionals. The undergraduate program in IT is limited to a number of students. It was planning to expand the undergraduate intake tenfold when the necessary infrastructure facilities are established by 2005. Further, the faculty has started a postgraduate program in IT from early 2004 and a few continuing professional development programs addressing the immediate needs of the local IT industry.

The Faculty of Information Technology offers two undergraduate and two postgraduate degrees which are

- Bachelor of Science in Information Technology
- Bachelor of Science in Information Technology and Management
- MSc. in Information Technology
- MSc. in Artificial Intelligence

The Departments at the Faculty of Information Technology are

- Department of Information Technology
- Department of Computational Mathematics
- Department of Interdisciplinary Studies

=== Faculty of Graduate Studies ===
The Faculty of Graduate Studies (FGS) was established in June 2016 to enhance the postgraduate research culture in the university. The faculty offers postgraduate research degrees: PhD, MPhil and MSc.

=== Faculty of Business ===
The Faculty of Business was established in June 2017. The business faculty at the University of Moratuwa offers undergraduate degree program in Business Science. Bachelor of Business Science (Hons.) is a four year full time program.

It offers three specialisations:

- Business Analytics
- Business Process Management
- Financial Services Management

There are three departments which offer these specialisations:

- Department of Decision Sciences
- Department of Management of Technology
- Department of Industrial Management

=== Faculty of Medicine ===
The Faculty of Medicine was established in 2020 as the eleventh Faculty of Medicine in the country. It is the only Faculty in the country to have a Department of Medical Technology. The Teaching Hospital Kalutara is the official teaching hospital for the Faculty of Medicine.

The departments at faculty of Medicine include:

- Department of Anatomy
- Department of Biochemistry and Clinical Chemistry
- Department of Physiology
- Department of Pharmacology
- Department of Microbiology and Parasitology
- Department of Community Medicine and Family Medicine
- Department of Pathology and Forensic Medicine
- Department of Medicine and Mental Health
- Department of Surgery and Anesthesia
- Department of Obstetrics and Gynecology
- Department of Paediatrics and Neonatology
- Department of Medical Education
- Department of Medical Technology

=== Institute of Technology ===
The Institute of Technology was founded as the Ceylon College of Technology in Moratuwa in 1966 with the technical assistance of UNESCO. The CCT commenced with specialisations in Civil Engineering, Electrical Engineering and Mechanical Engineering, initially utilising the physical facilities available at the IPT. In 2000, the Institute of Technology was established to conduct the National Diploma in Technology course separately from the Faculty of Engineering, with the Ordinance for the same having been gazetted in August 2000.

=== Other entities ===
- Information Systems Division / MIS Unit

An Education Management Information System officially established around 2007, serves most of the information system related services including e-Learning, EMIS, DMS and ERP for all of the university.

- Center for Information Technology Services (CITeS)

CITeS is responsible for the University IT Infrastructure, which includes administration of university network backbone, general server administration and maintenance of common computing facilities. CITeS is currently running the Cisco Networking Center.

- Industrial Automation Research Center (IARC)
- Medical Centre
- Day Care Centre
- Media Centre
- Centre for Instructional Technologies

== Administrative structure and key persons ==
=== Chancellor ===
Chancellor is the head of the university and is responsible for awarding all the academic degrees. Usually, the chancellor is a distinguished person in an academic discipline. Otherwise, it is a distinguished person or a clergy in the civil society. The appointment is done by the head of the state, the President of Sri Lanka. The position is mainly ceremonial and duties are usually carried out by the vice chancellor. The current chancellor of the university is Professor Monte Cassim.

=== Vice Chancellor ===
The vice-chancellor is the principal academic and administrative officer of the university, responsible for the management tasks. This appointment is also done by the President of Sri Lanka. The vice-chancellor of the university is Prof. K.T.M.U.Hemapala

=== Deputy Vice Chancellor ===
The current deputy of vice chancellor is prof. D. P. Chandrasekara.

=== Deans of Faculties ===
Deans are the heads of the faculties. They are responsible for the management of and the tasks carried out by the faculty. Deans are appointed by the chancellor for three years.

- Faculty of Engineering: Professor J.M.A. Manathunga
- Faculty of Architecture: Professor Y. J. Sandanayake
- Faculty of Information Technology: B. H. Sudantha, BSc (Hons), MPhil
- Faculty of Graduate Studies: Professor R.A.RC. Gopura
- Faculty of Business: Professor G. D. Samarasinghe.
- Faculty of Medicine: Professor .S.D. Pilapitita

=== Other officers ===
- Registrar: D. L. D. Jayantha
- Librarian: R. C. Kodika
- Bursar: K. A. D. Pushpakeerthi

=== Staff unions and clubs ===
- University of Moratuwa Students Association
- University of Moratuwa Teachers Association
- Toastmasters Club

== Former chancellors ==
- Arthur C. Clarke - former chancellor
- Ray Wijewardene - former chancellor
- K.K.Y.W.Perera -former chancellor
- Roland Silva - former vice chancellor

== Notable alumni ==
- Ashoka Ranwala - Former Speaker of the Parliament of Sri Lanka
- Bimal Rathnayake - Minister of Transport, Highways, Ports and Civil Aviation and Leader of the House
- Indira Samarasekera - 12th president and vice-chancellor of the University of Alberta
- Lalith Gamage - President of the Sri Lanka Institute of Information Technology
- Janaka Ruwanpura - Vice-Provost International, University of Calgary, Canada
- Asoka Abeygunawardana - Chairman & CEO of Strategic Enterprise Management Agency at Presidential Secretariat, Sri Lanka
- Champika Ranawaka - Former Cabinet Minister, Government of Sri Lanka
- Nimal Rajapakshe - Professor & Former Dean, Simon Fraser University
- Rishad Bathiudeen - Former minister
- Ruchira Wijesena - Senior Lecturer at the Institute of Technology, University of Moratuwa

== Student life ==
=== Student organisations ===
Students at the University of Moratuwa run over 25 clubs and organisations. These include cultural and religious groups, academic clubs and common-interest organisations. The University Students' Union is considered the highest body which represents all internal students of the university. Separate student unions operate in each faculty.

=== Sports and recreation ===
The Department of Physical Education caters to the student population of the university in sports. The department gives the students sports facilities in two ways:

- Students who wish to play games only for fun and to use the facilities for fitness may use the power room, swimming, weightlifting room, common room for table tennis, carom and chess and the gymnasium to play badminton.
- The department conducts a regular programme for 18 sports: athletics, badminton, basketball, carom, chess, cricket, elle, football, karate, netball, rowing, rugby football, table tennis, taekwondo, tennis, volleyball, weightlifting and wrestling. The department gives the facilities necessary for these sports and supplies qualified coaches for most of the games. The aim in this regular programme is to participate in the annual inter-university and national championships.

== See also ==
- Education in Sri Lanka
- Sri Lankan universities
