= Akita International University =

University in Akita Prefecture, Japan

- 国際教養大学
- Motto: Be a Global Leader!
- Type: Public
- Established: 2004
- President: Monte Cassim
- Faculty: 61
- Undergraduates: 859
- Postgraduates: 61
- Location: Akita, Akita, Japan; 39°37′39″N 140°11′52″E
- Campus: Suburb
- Colours: Green and Beige
- Mascot: One
- Website: www.aiu.ac.jp www.aiu.ac.jp/en/

Akita International University (国際教養大学, Kokusai Kyōyō Daigaku), or AIU, is a public university located in Akita City, Akita Prefecture, Japan. Established in 2004 and modeled on American liberal arts colleges, AIU is one of the few universities in Japan offering all of its courses in English. It has currently 211 international partner institutions in 52 different countries and regions. The president of AIU is Monte Cassim.

== History ==
During trade summit meetings in 1986, negotiations began between Japanese and American officials to establish a university in Akita Prefecture. In May 1990, the government of Minnesota in the United States reached an agreement with Akita Prefecture to establish a campus of Minnesota State Colleges and Universities (MnSCU) on a 50,725 square meter plot of land. Students completed English classes and general education classes at the Minnesota State University—Akita campus and studied in the US to complete classes for their majors at one of the Minnesota State University campuses.

In 1997, the university was planned to shut down, with programs phasing out by 2001. Minnesota was spending an unsustainable $25,000 per student at MSU—Akita, five times more than $5,000 per student in the rest of the MnSCU system.

In October 1998, the Council for Enhancement of Higher Education in Akita founded.

In 1999, MnSCU Chancellor Morris J. Anderson continued negotiations with Japanese officials to try to find a way for the American-style university to continue operations in Japan.

The International University Founding and Preparatory Committee was formed in 2002 to prepare for a new university to be founded at the site.

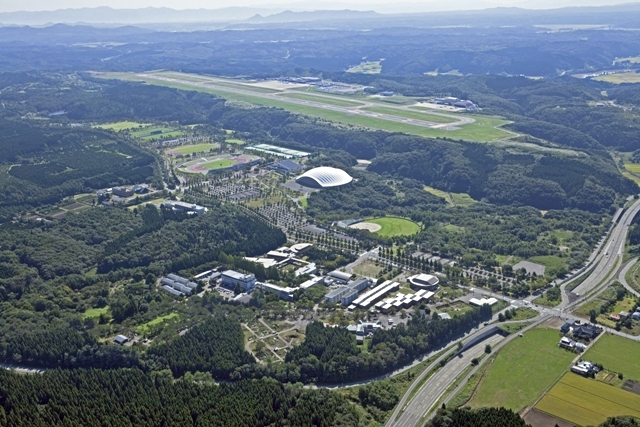
Aerial view of the university

Akita International University's establishment was approved by the Ministry of Education, Culture, Sports, Science and Technology of Japan in November 2003 and the university was inaugurated in April 2004 with Dr. Mineo Nakajima as the founding president.

In March 2008, the library building was completed. It was originally known as the AIU Library until it was renamed the Nakajima Library in November 2014 in honor of the university's founding president. The library was designed by Mitsuru Senda and has won awards for its architecture.

Dr. Norihiko Suzuki was appointed as the second president in June 2013.

In June 2021, Dr. Monte Cassim was appointed as the university's third president.

== Campus ==
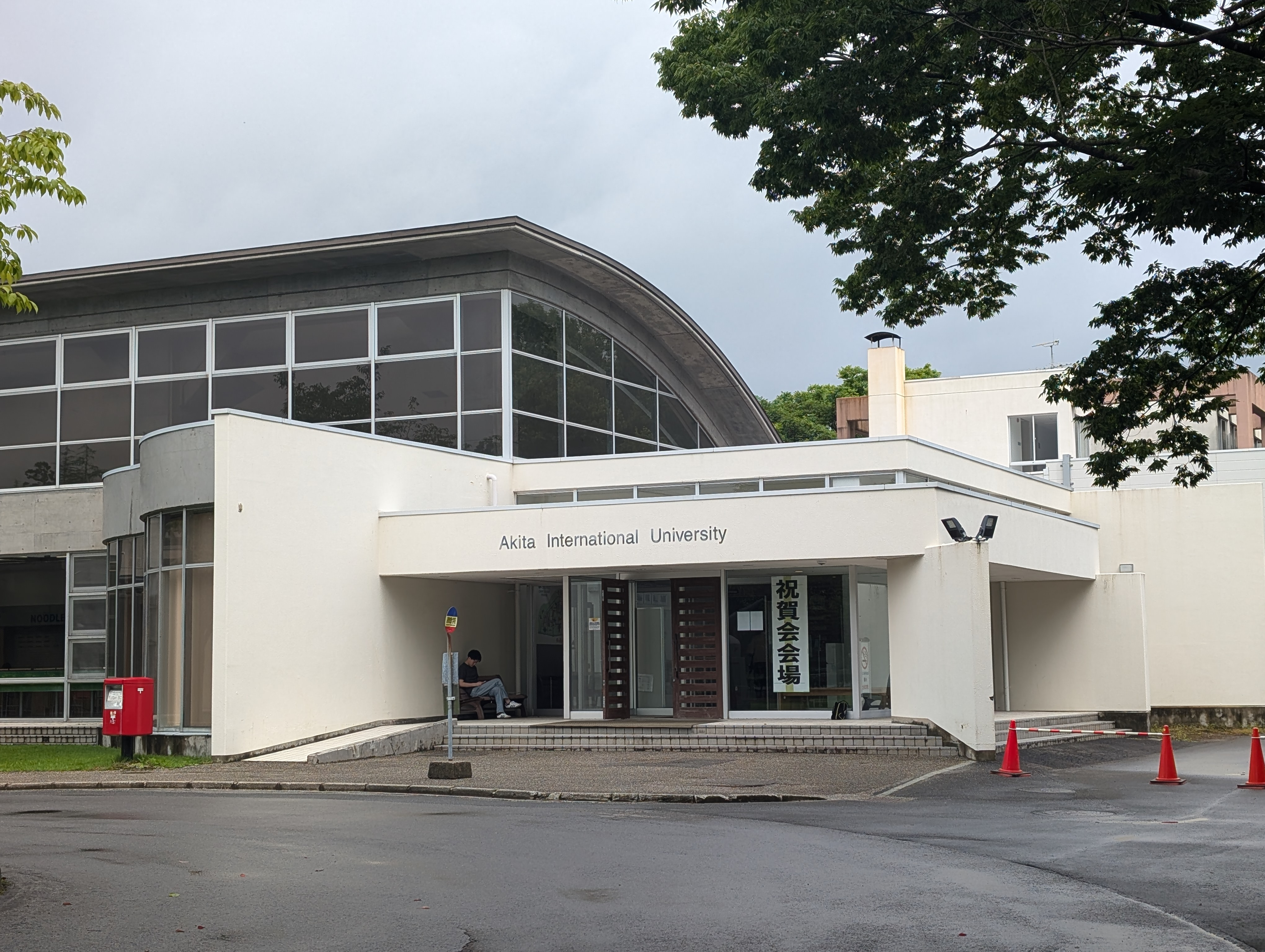
Main entrance and bus stop

Akita International University's campus is located in Akita, the capital of Akita Prefecture.

The campus is in a rural environment. Bears have been seen on or near the campus and bells are issued to students to prevent bear attacks. It takes 10 minutes at most to walk between places on campus. It's about a 10-minute drive to Akita Airport. Bus services provide connections to Aeon Mall Akita.

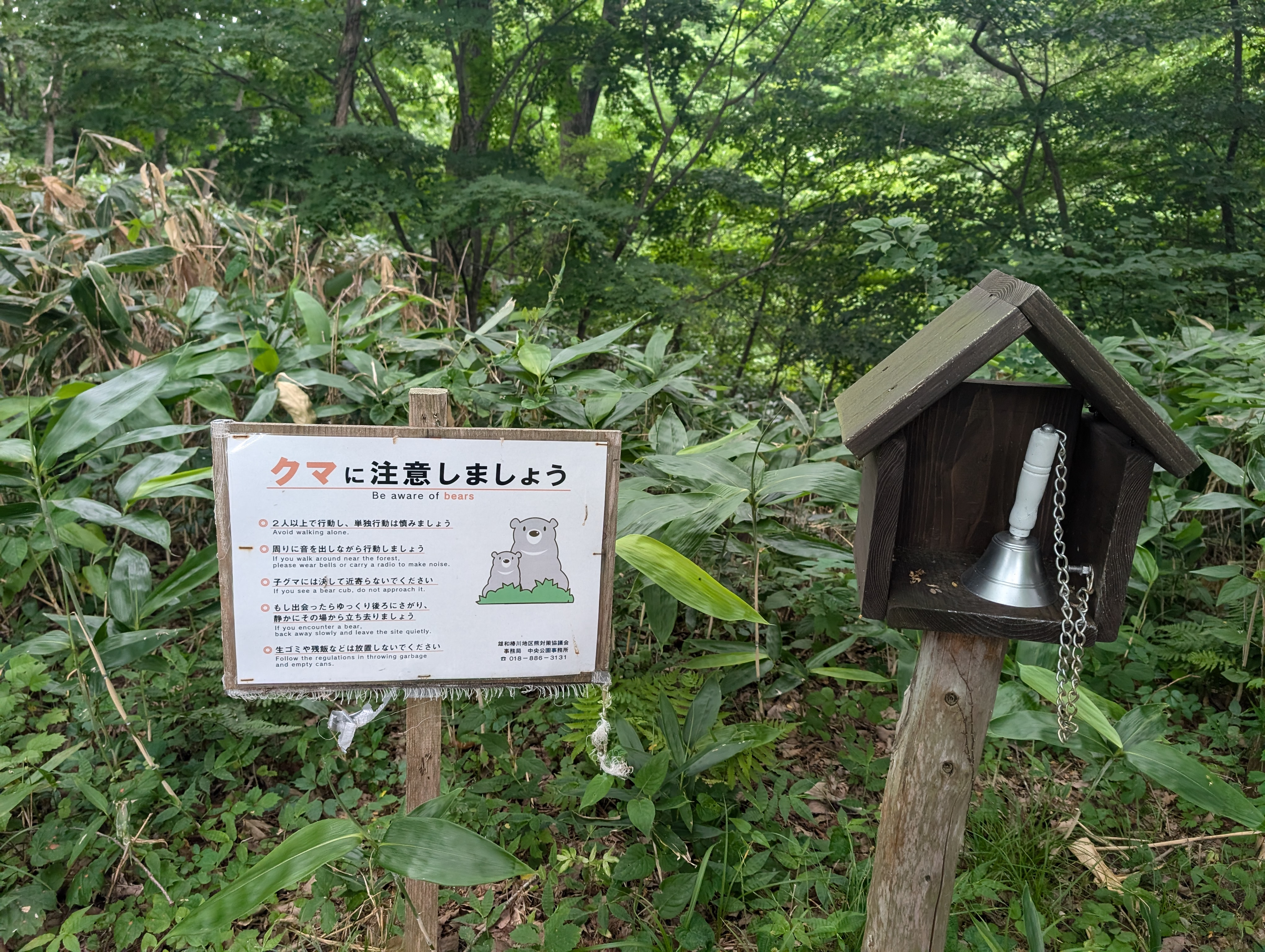
A sign warning of bears and a bell in a forest next to Akita International University

Adjacent to the university is Akita Prefectural Central Park, which is equipped with facilities for many sports.

The campus is completely smoke-free.

=== Facilities ===
Most of AIU's buildings are connected by indoor walkways, allowing people to easily walk from one building to another during inclement weather.

==== Academic buildings ====
Most of the university's classrooms are in Buildings B, C, and D. The classrooms in Buildings B and C are primarily for undergraduate classes while Building D is used for graduate classes. Some of the classrooms in Building D are named after companies that donated to the university. Building A houses administrative offices as well as faculty offices.

==== Nakajima Library ====
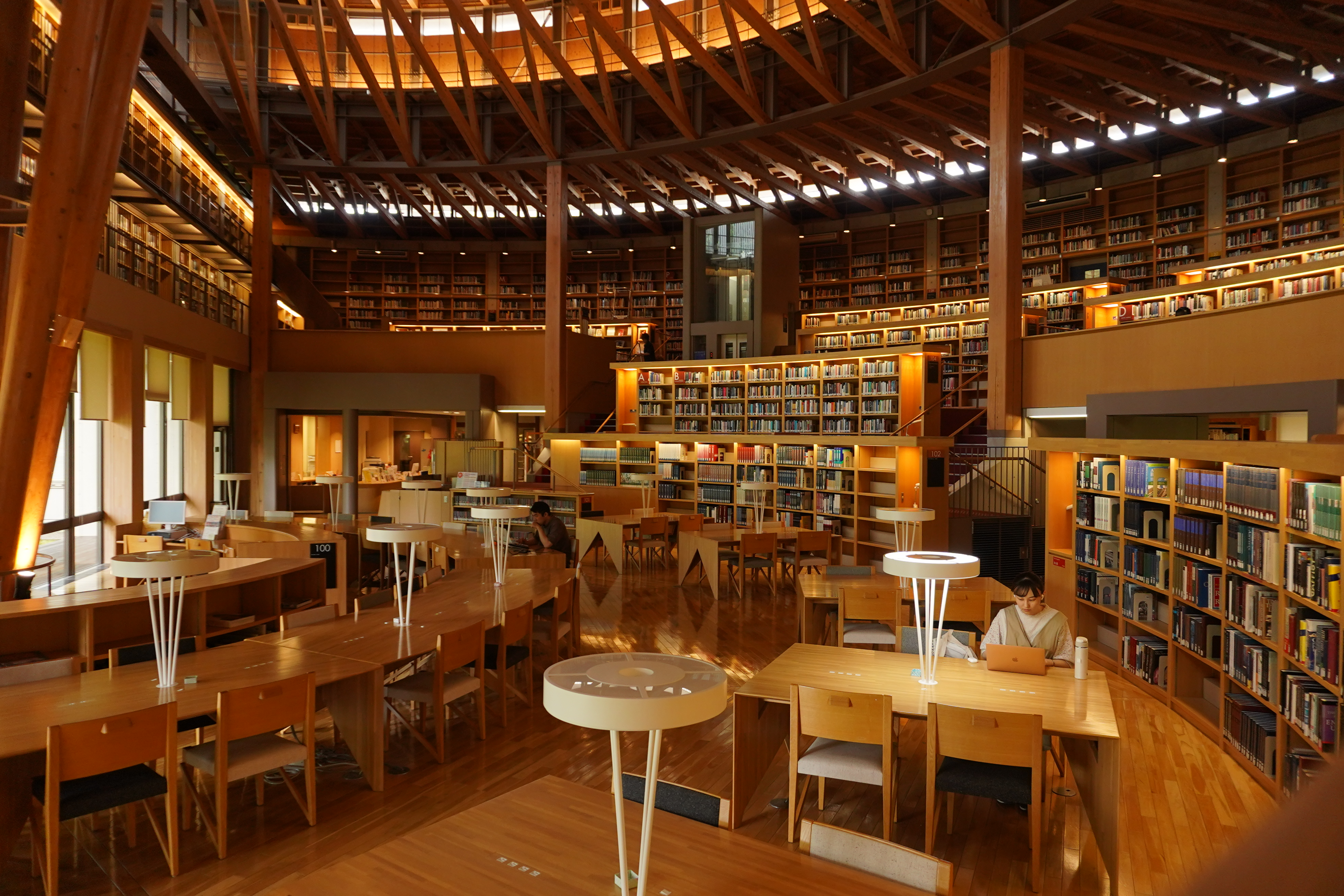
Inside the Nakajima Library

The Nakajima Library, named after founding president Mineo Nakajima, is open 24/7 every day. The building's interior is made of locally-grown cedar wood and its half-dome shape is inspired by traditional Japanese parasols. It has won a Japan Institute of Architects Award, a Good Design Award, and an International Architecture Award.

The library's collection includes over 87,400 physical books, over 490,000 e-book titles, over 4,600 CDs and DVDs, as well as access to databases and journals. Computer labs in the library are open 24/7.

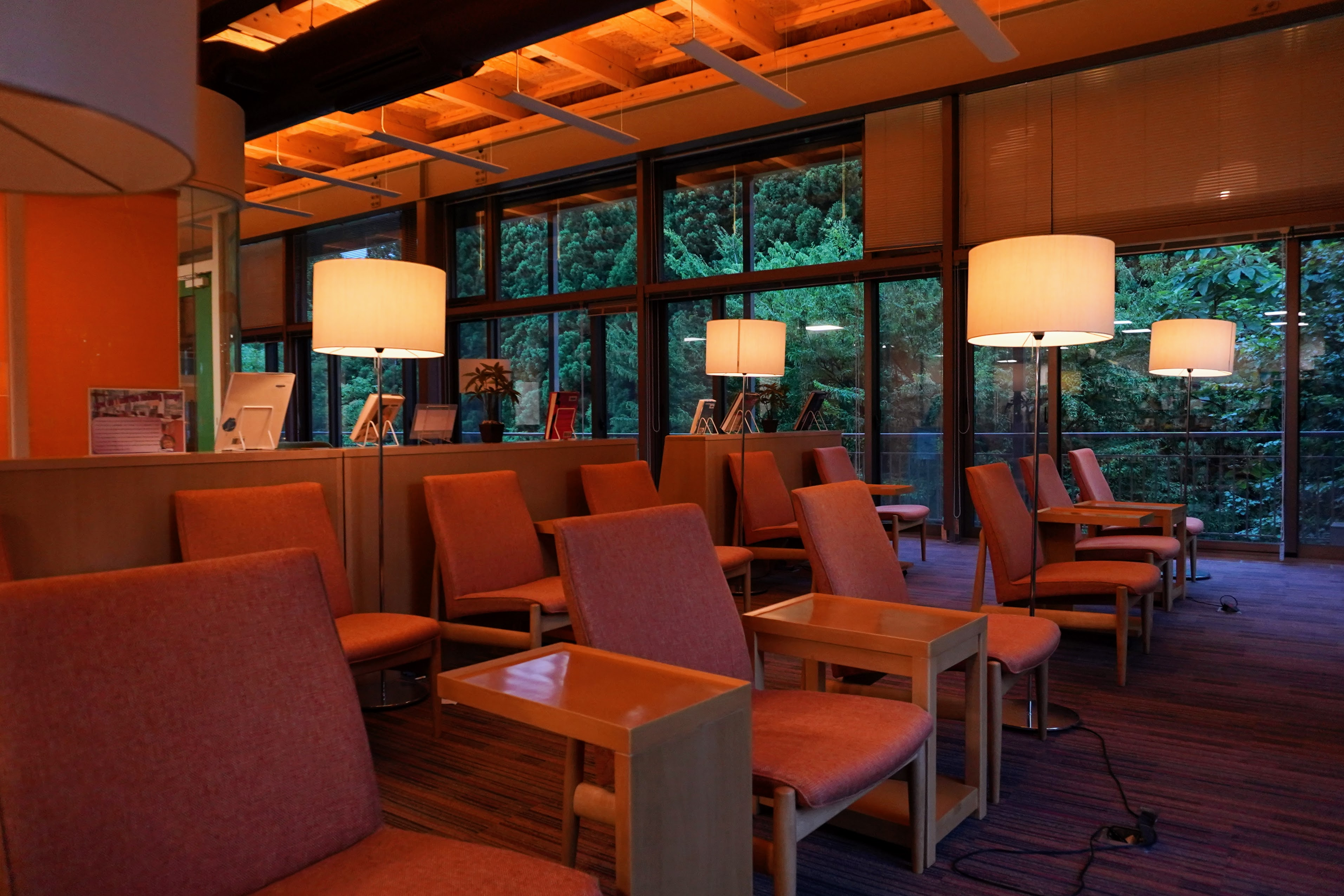
A seating area in the Nakajima Library

The library offers services to the general public with limited hours and days. High school students can access the services daily but at limited hours. AIU students also have access to the library's online services.

The building also houses the X Lounge, a student study space on the ground level, and the Language Development and Intercultural Studies Center on the second level. The LDIC is equipped with rooms for language practice and playing media.

==== Dining ====
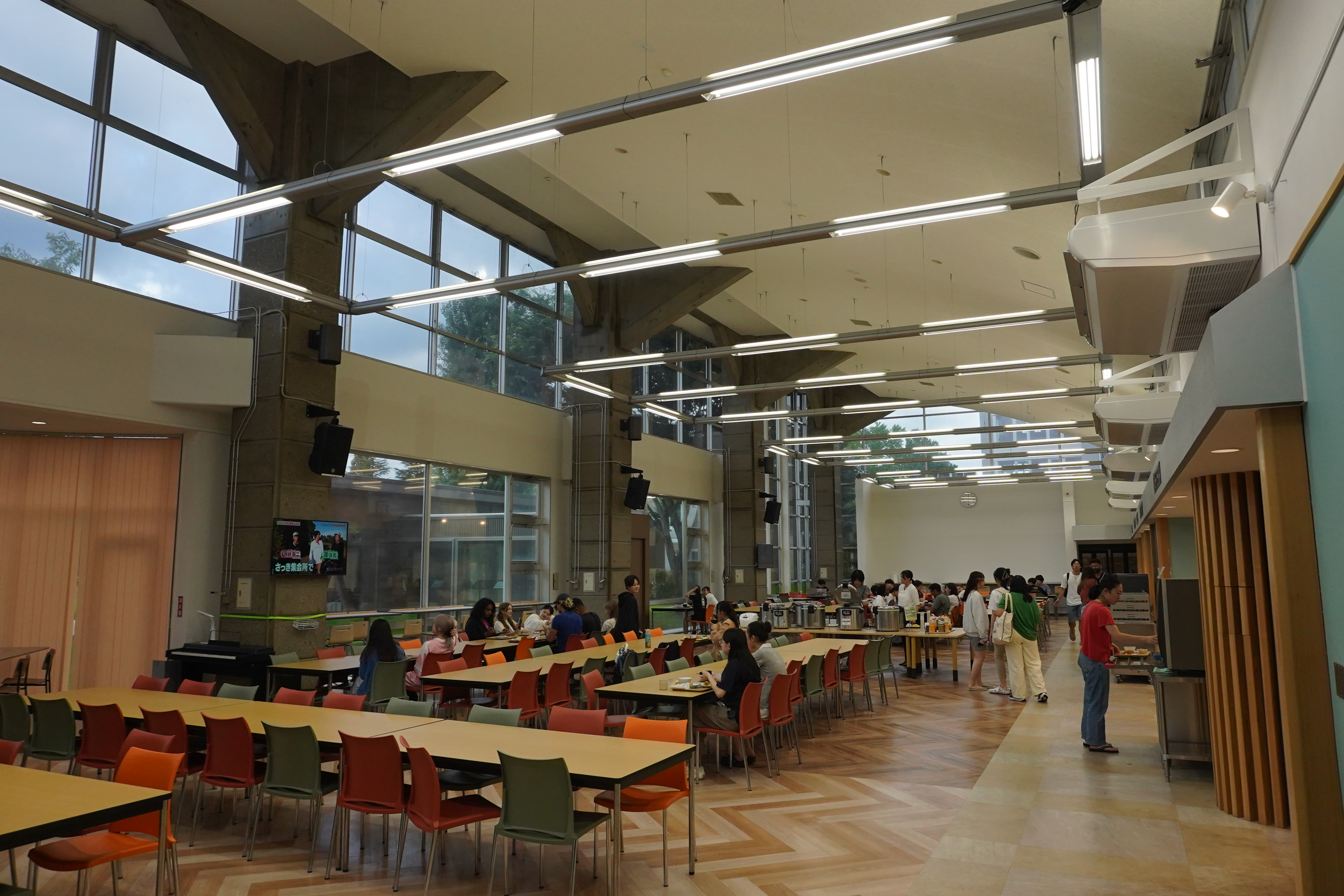
Inside the cafeteria

AIU's cafeteria serves breakfast, lunch, and dinner; people without meal plans can purchase individual meals or prepaid cards. The cafeteria also has a restaurant that operates at limited hours, serving dishes cooked to order.

In Student Hall, there's a cafe that sells various foods and drinks and the AIU shop, a convenience store with packaged foods.

There are many beverage vending machines around the campus.

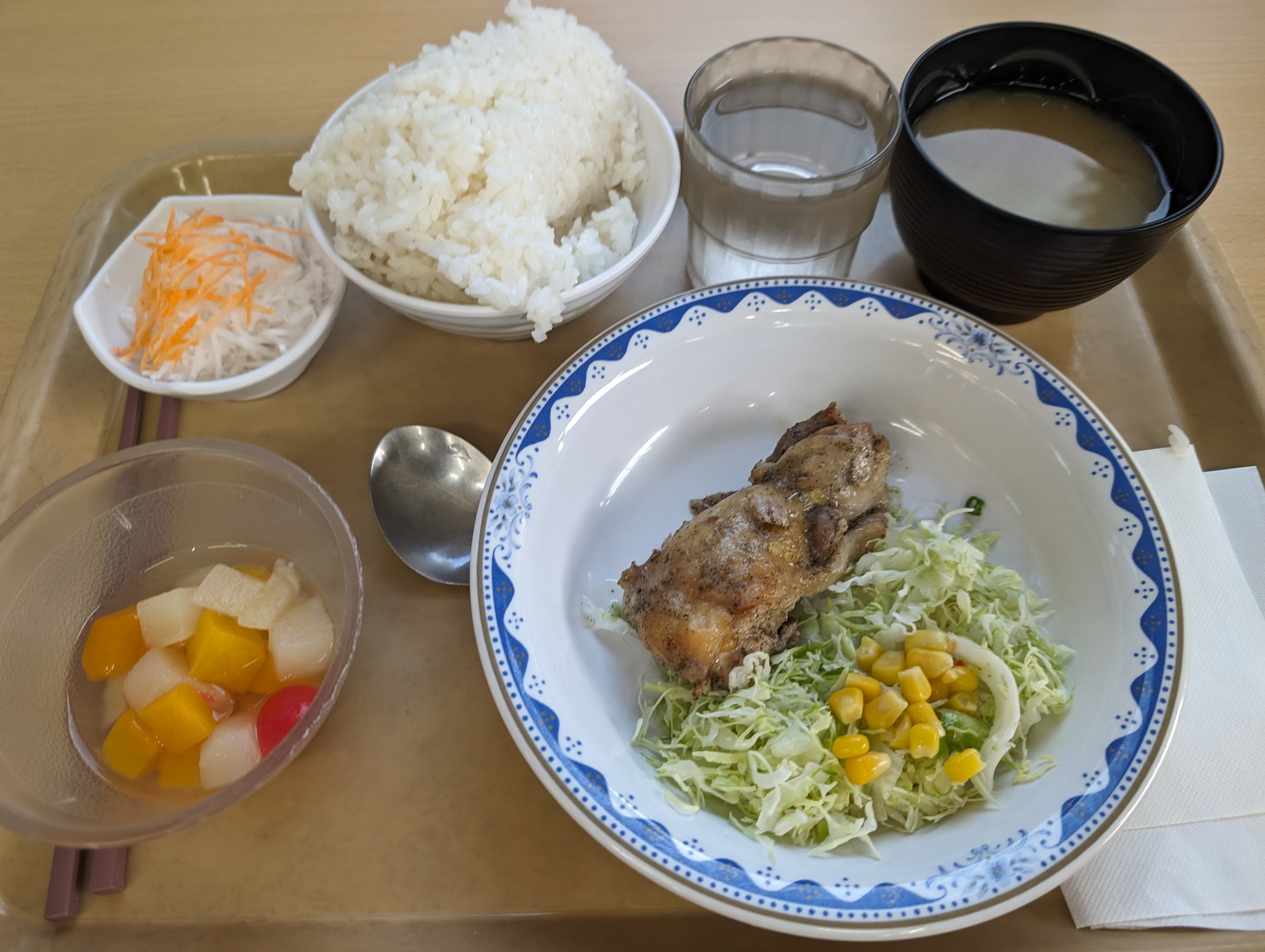
A typical meal at AIU includes an entree, a side dish, and a serving of fruit or other dessert. Unlimited rice, soup, green tea, water, and condiments are available.

Also, there are a few small businesses next to the campus that sell food.

==== Student housing ====
AIU offers several on-campus housing options for the 91% of students who live on campus. Housing is free during summer breaks for students enrolled in the prior spring semester and the following fall semester, but housing fees are required for winter breaks. Housing is guaranteed for international students.

Komachi Hall, built in 1990 and renovated in 2023, is for freshmen students and exchange students. It features 160 double rooms and four accessible rooms. While individual rooms do not have cooking facilities, Komachi Hall provides a community kitchen. Other amenities include student lounges, laundry rooms, and vending machines.

Global Village, built in 2007, has a mix of single and double occupancy rooms. It features 100 single rooms, 92 double rooms, and 4 single-occupancy, accessible rooms. All apartments in Global Village are single-sex.

Sakura Village, constructed in 2013, has triple occupancy suites. Each suite consists of single bedrooms with shared bathroom and kitchen facilities. The suites are in two-story buildings that have separate entrances for each floor.

Tsubaki Village was constructed in 2022 and has 252 single rooms and three barrier-free (accessible) rooms. Each unit consists of 12 individual bedrooms attached to a common living-dining-kitchen area and bathroom. Tsubaki Village offers both single-sex and mixed-sex floors, with locks on each unit and each room of a unit. Residents of Tsubaki Village can also live in "themed houses" where they plan events and activities for the university.

The Graduate House, constructed in 1990 and renovated in 2011 and again in 2019, is only for graduate students. It features 33 suites that each have a shared kitchen, shared bathroom, and three single-occupancy bedrooms.

==== Other facilities ====
Suda Hall, also known as Multi-purpose Hall, is used for events. It also has a small gym.

The university provides free mental health care and medical services in Building E.

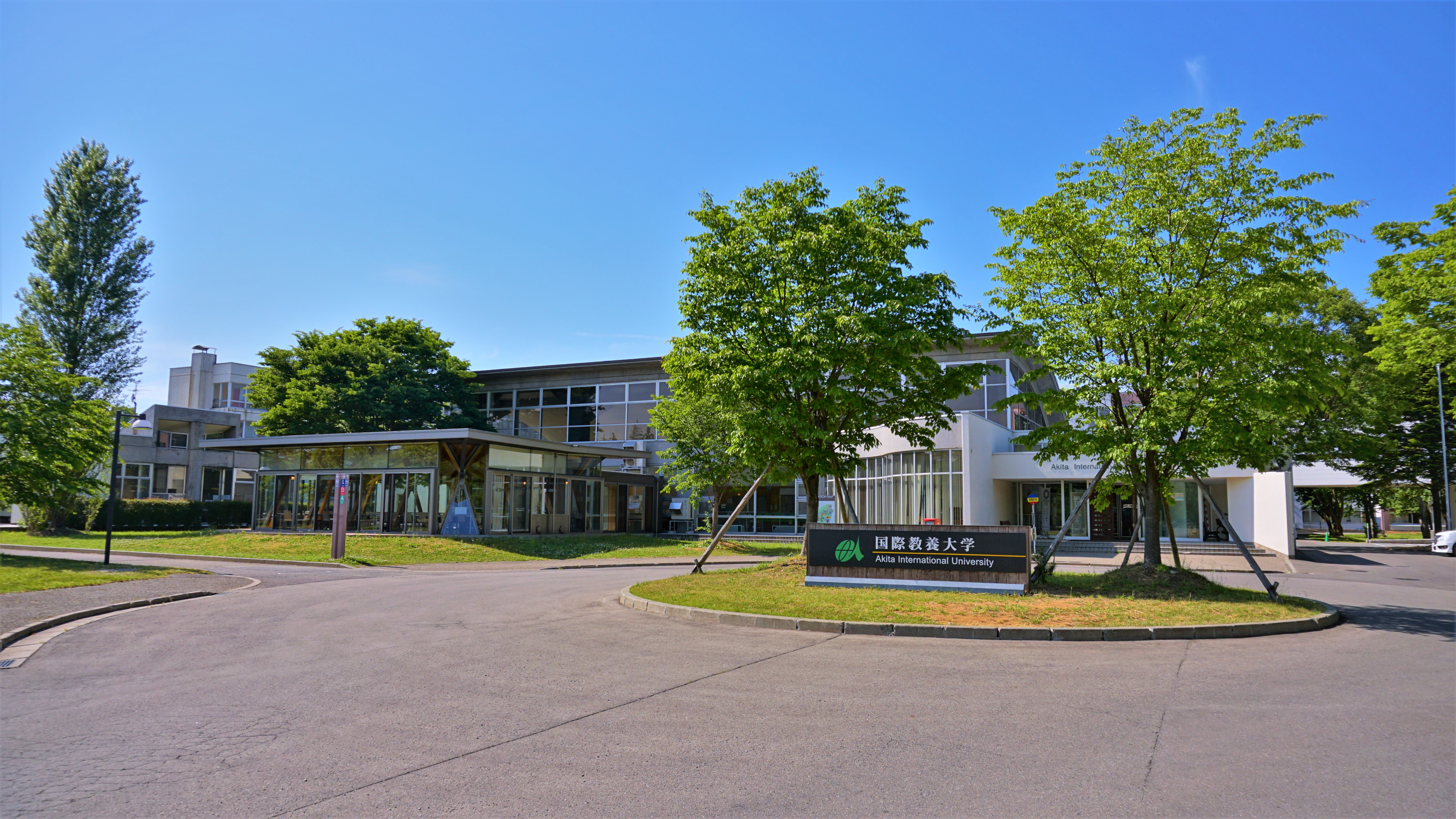
The main entrance with a small roundabout

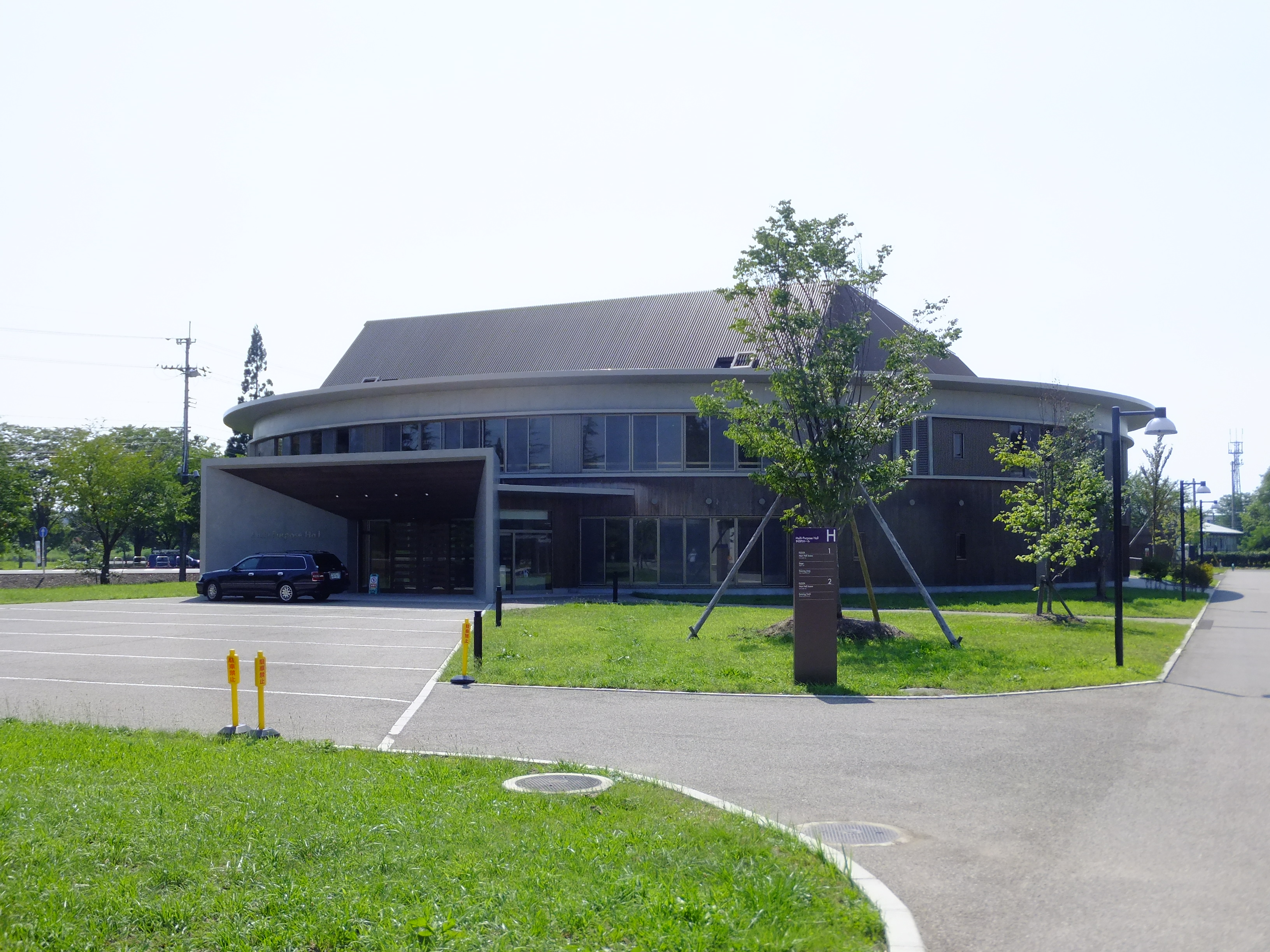
Suda Hall/Multipurpose Hall is used for events and has a gym

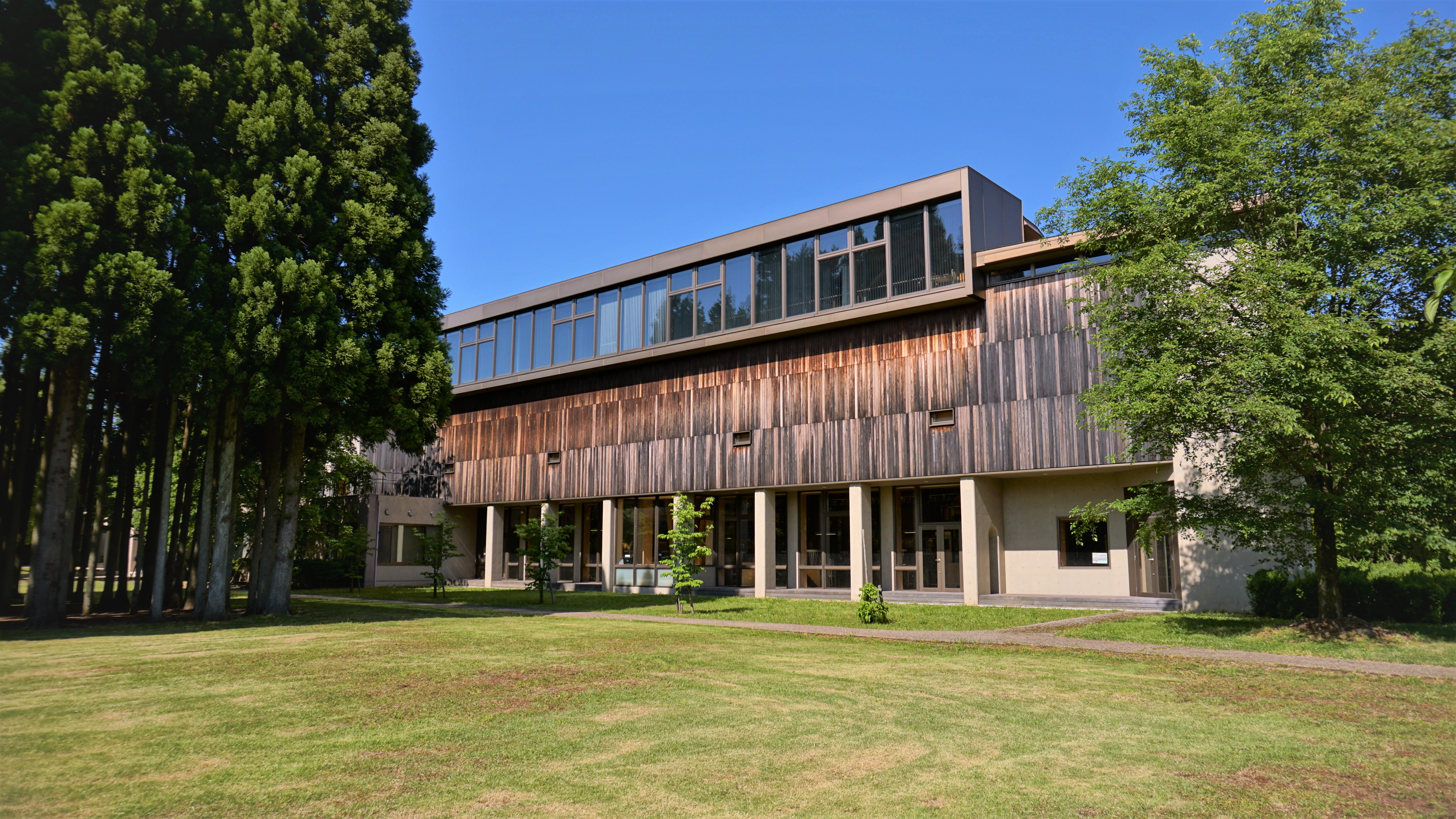
Exterior of Nakajima Library

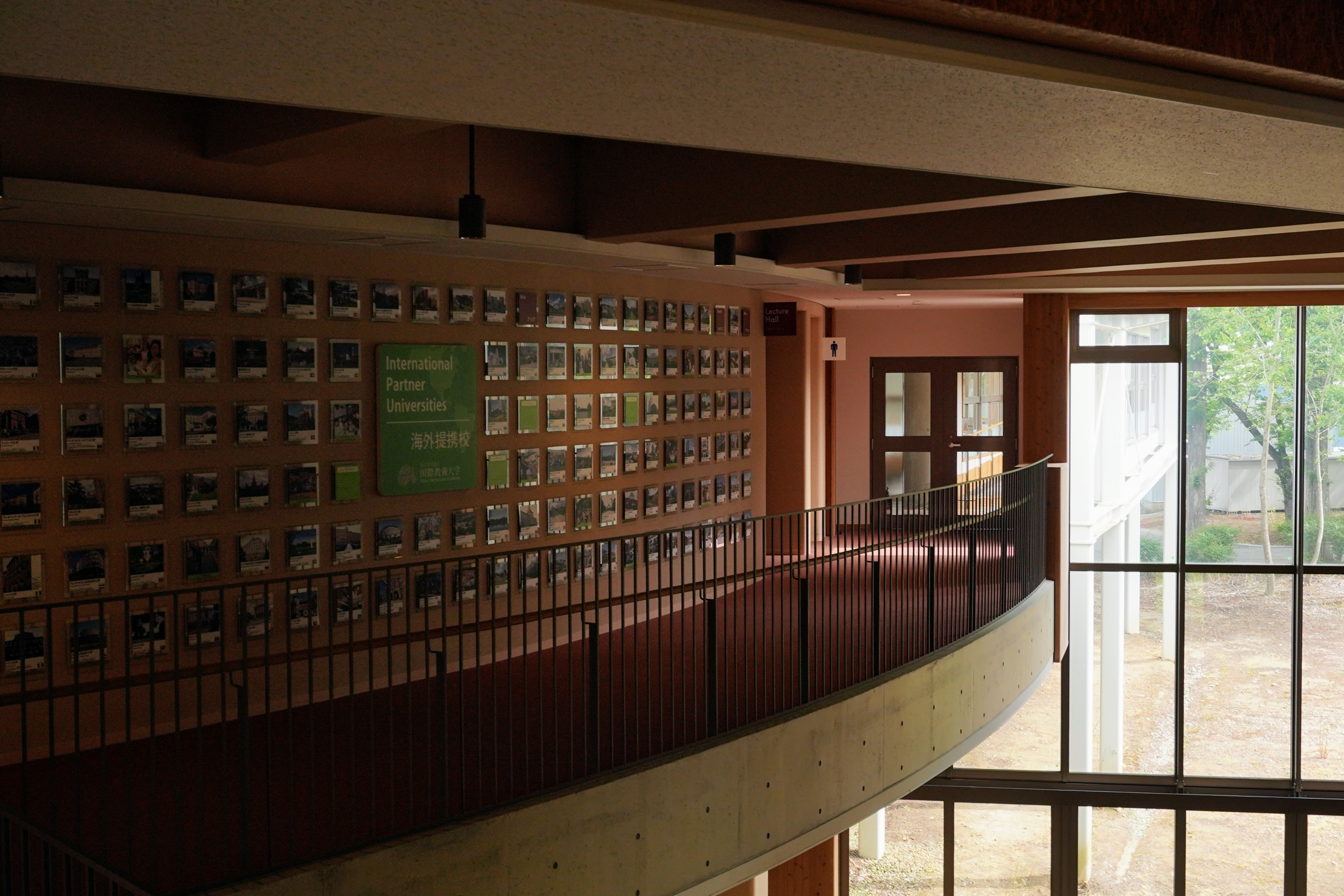
A wall inside Building D features a plaque with a photo for each partner university. The indoor walkway to Building A is also visible.

Global Village

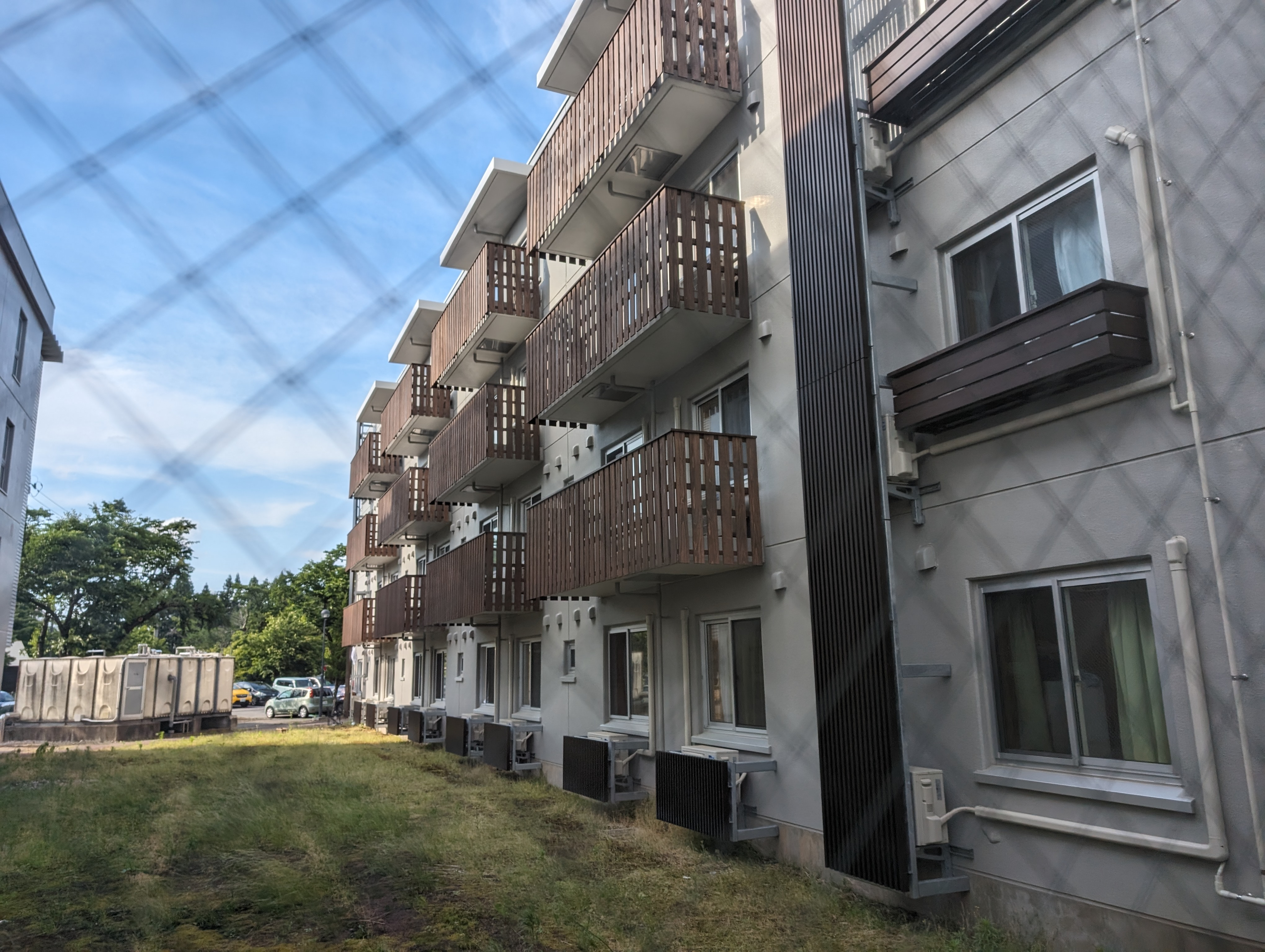
Komachi Hall seen from inside

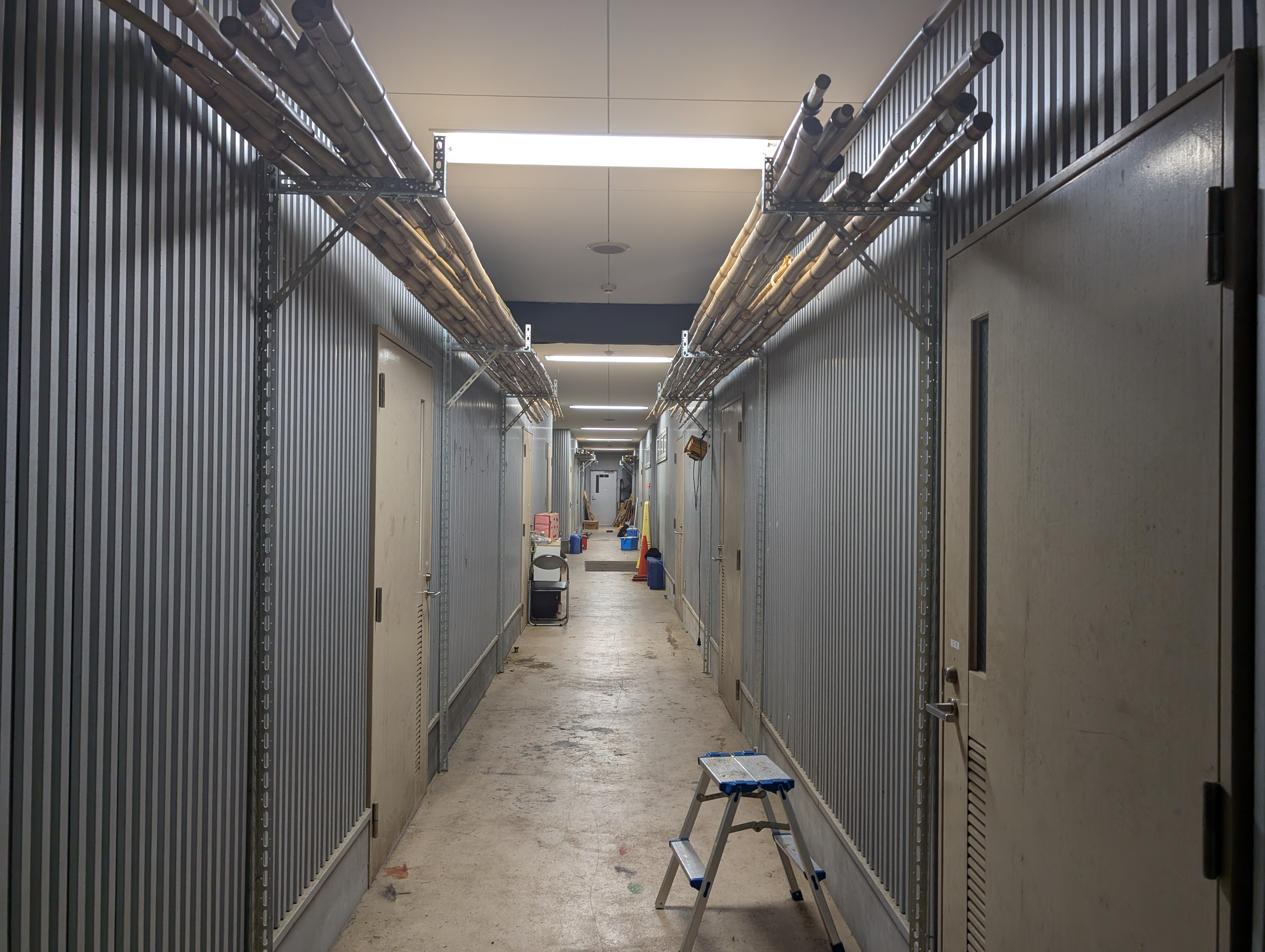
The club house, where clubs store their equipment

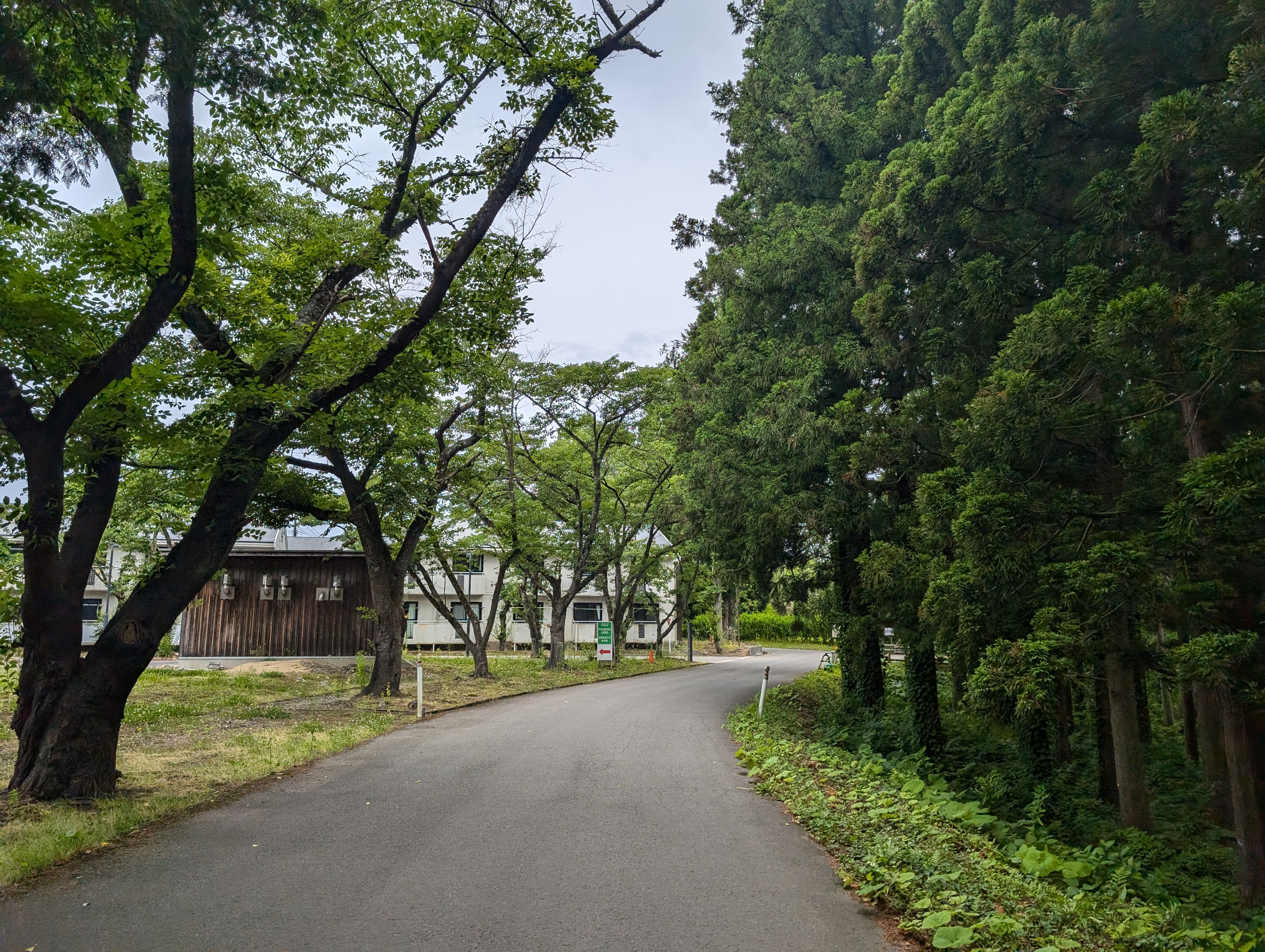
A road divides the Akita International University campus (left) and a forest (right)

== Academics ==
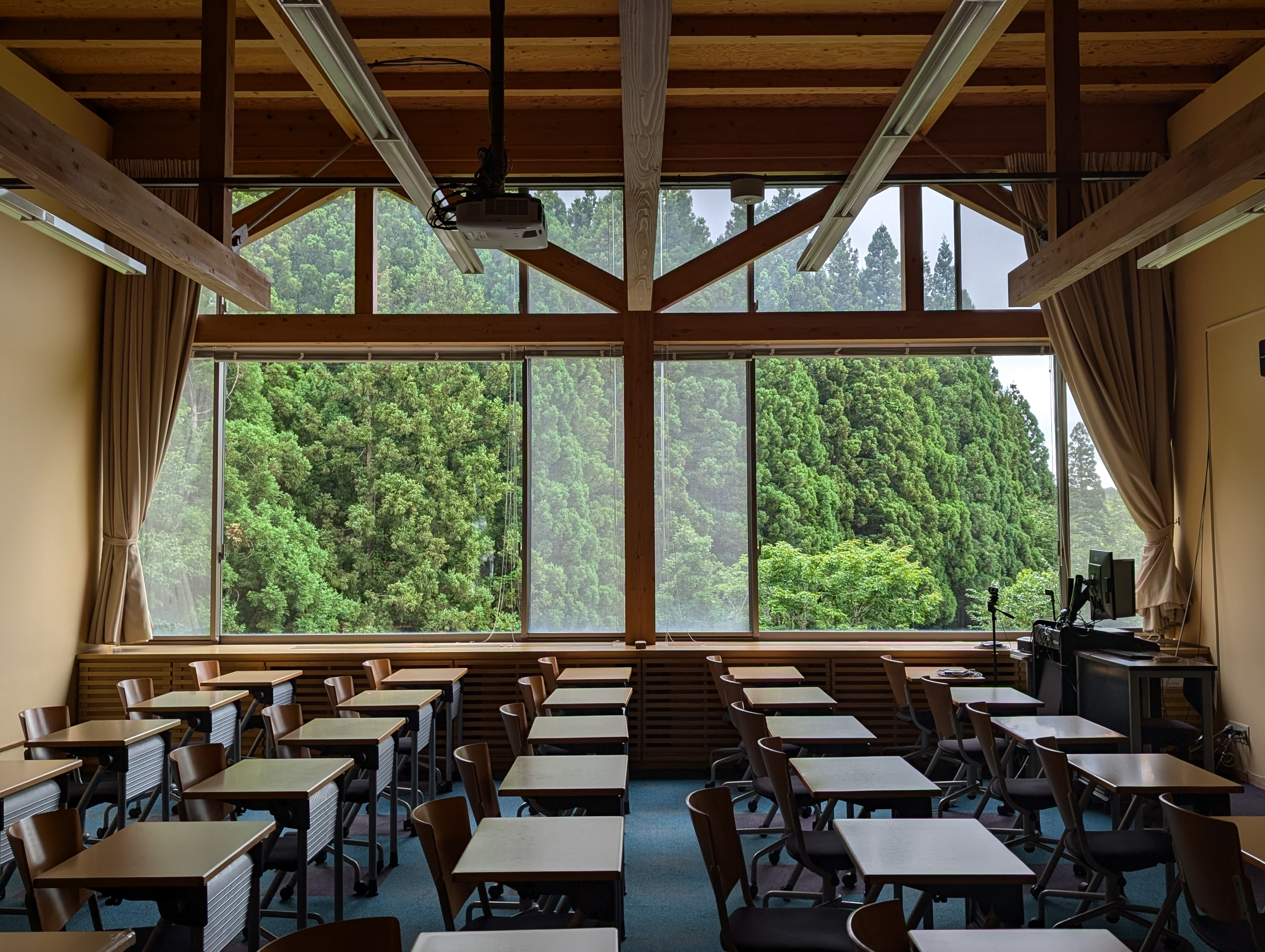
A classroom in Building D

The undergraduate programs are taught entirely in English, making them unique for Japan. Non-native English-speaking students are prepared for using English in the classroom through the English for Academic Purposes (EAP) Program.

The university offers bachelor's degrees in three undergraduate programs: Global Business, Global Studies, and Global Connectivity. Students are required to study abroad for a year. All three programs end with a capstone seminar.

For international students, AIU also offers a Japan Studies Program and a Japan Language Program.

At the graduate level, AIU offers master's degrees in English Language Teaching, Japanese Language Teaching, and Global Communication Practices. These programs cater to students interested in language education and international communication.

The student to faculty ratio is 13:1, but there's an average of 17 students enrolled in each course.

== Organization and administration ==
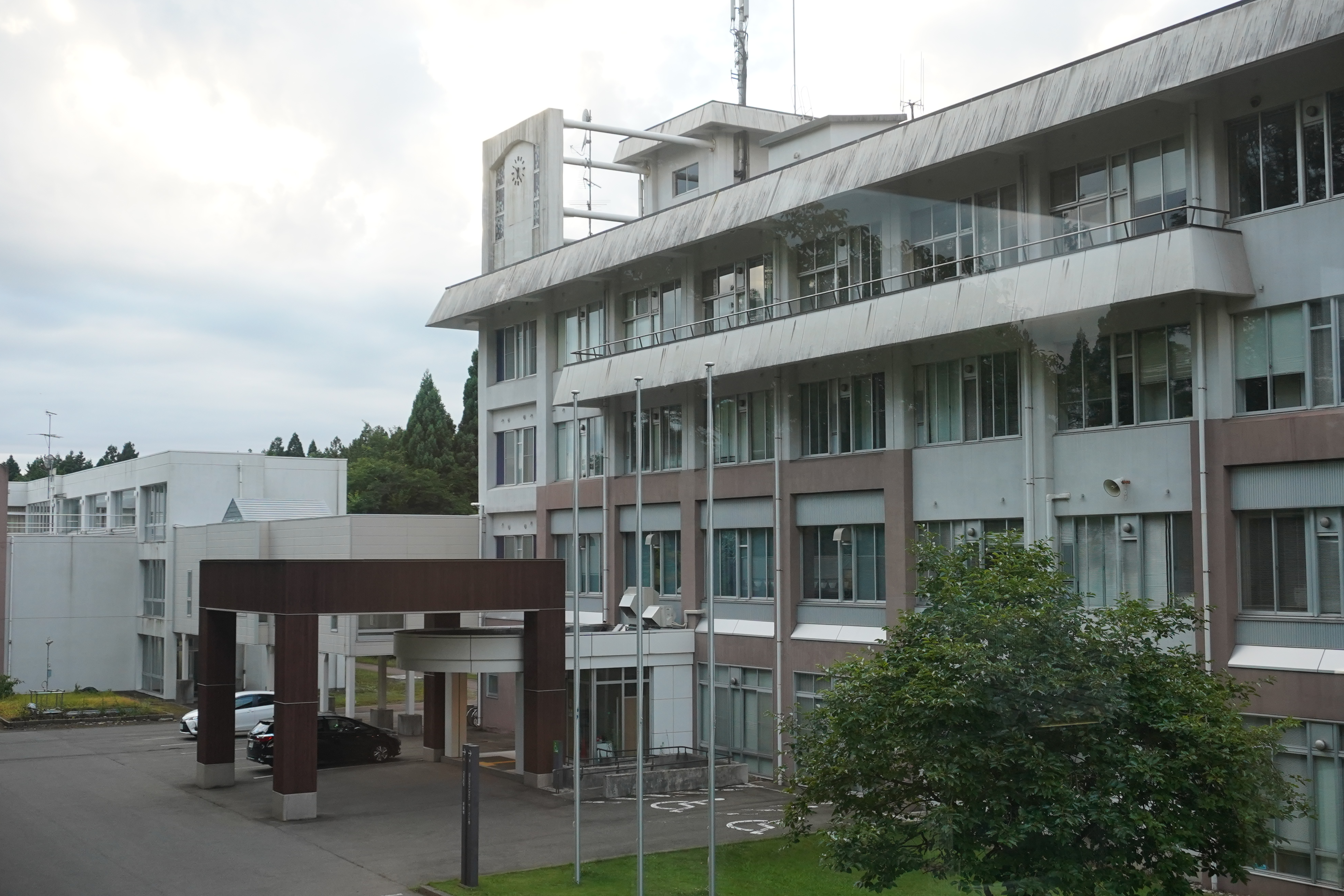
Building A, where the university's administrative offices are located.

Akita International University is led by President Monte Cassim. The Board of Directors includes the Chair of the Board (the President), a Managing Trustee who serves as the Vice-President, and additional Trustees responsible for various aspects of university management.

The President's Advisory Board consists of experts from academia, business, and public service who provide guidance on university matters.

The University Management Committee, chaired by the President, oversees the institution's operations and includes trustees responsible for specific areas such as human resources, academic affairs, admissions, and student affairs.

Japan has two types of public universities: national and prefectural. AIU is a prefectural university, meaning it's managed by the local government.

Presidents
Mineo Nakajima	2004–2013
Norihiko Suzuki	2013–2021
Monte Cassim	2013–present

== Admissions ==
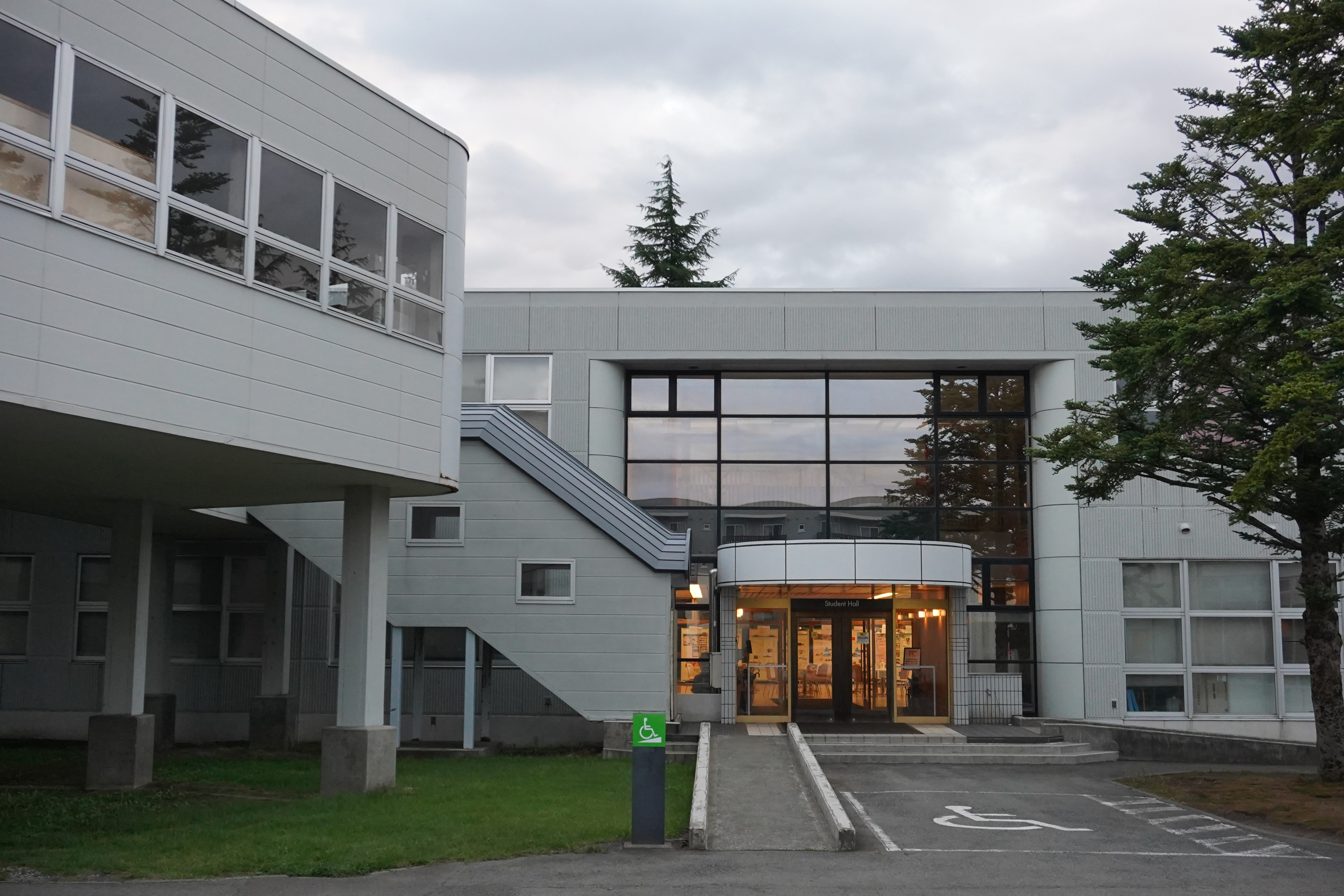
Exterior of Student Hall

Akita International University (AIU) offers multiple admission opportunities throughout the year for both Japanese and international students. The university has two main intake periods: April and September, with a total admission capacity of 175 students for the undergraduate program. Costs vary depending on the different admissions processes.

Japanese students who want to enroll or transfer apply through the university's online applications system. After submitting their applications and required information, prospective students must take an entrance exam, write an essay, and be interviewed to determine their English competency.

There are 13 different admissions processes for Japanese students, depending on who they are, when they plan to enroll, whether they want to participate in a special subject, and other factors.

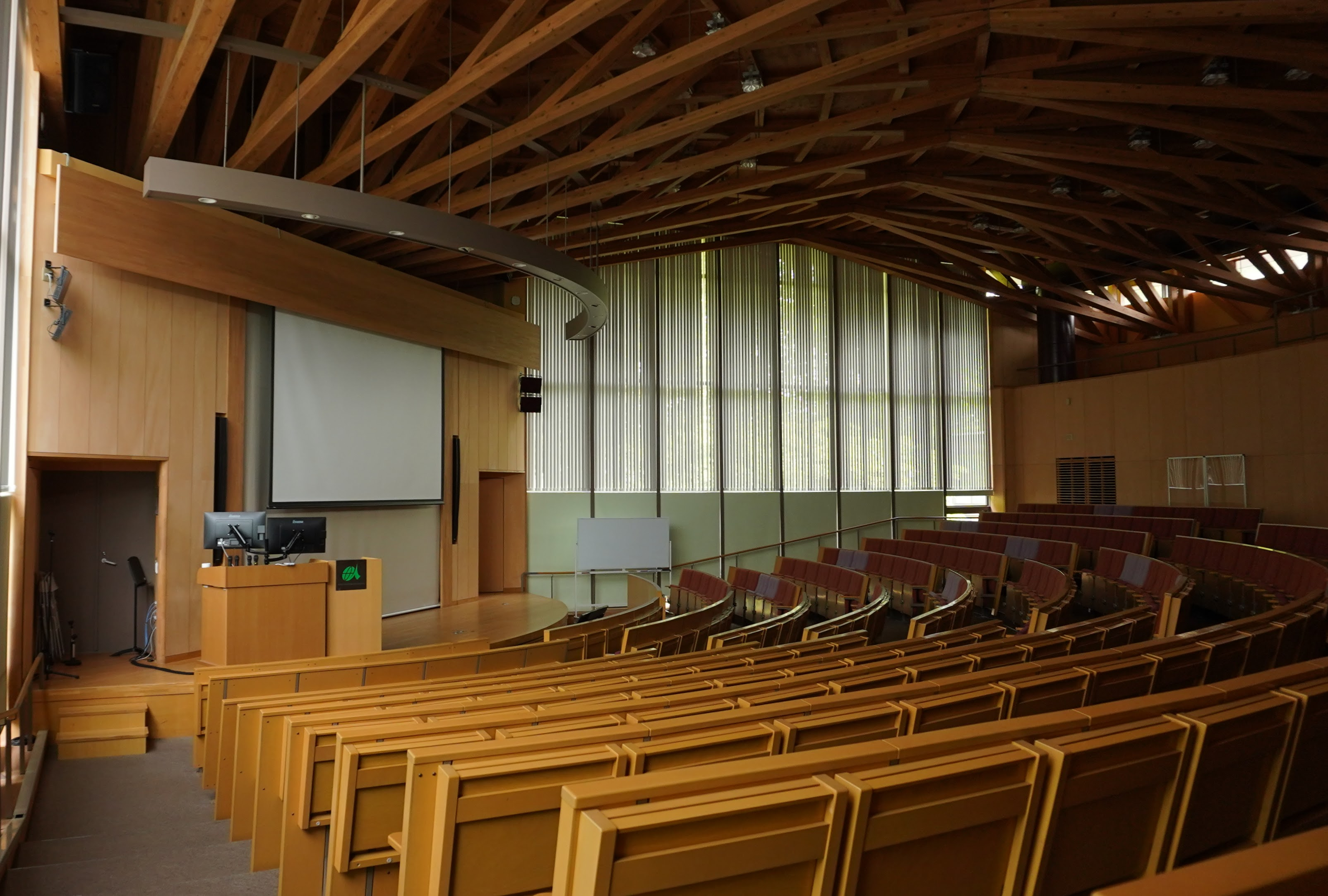
Building D lecture hall

For international students, AIU provides several application options. The university accepts applications for semester or year-long exchange programs, as well as for degree-seeking students. For exchange students, the application process begins with a nomination from their home institution. The nomination periods are typically in February for fall semesters and in September for spring semesters.

After nomination, students must complete an online application and submit required documents via email. Applicants must meet specific eligibility criteria, including being enrolled at their home institution during the application process and their stay at AIU, having completed at least two semesters with grades reflected on their transcript, and maintaining a minimum cumulative GPA of 2.50 on a 4.00 scale.

For non-native English-speaking international students, proof of English proficiency is required. Acceptable certificates include IELTS (5.0 or above), TOEFL (500 or above PBT, 61 or above iBT), TOEIC (630 or above), or CEFR (B1 or above).

AIU also offers special programs. The Summer Program is available in the summer for international students who don't know Japanese or know very little. The Japanese Language and Cultural Immersion Program (Advanced J-CIPA) is available in the winter for international students who understand Japanese well.

== Student body ==
As of 2026, there are 874 undergraduate students and 61 graduate students. 32% of degree-seeking students are male and 68% are female. International students make up a quarter of the student population.

== Student life ==
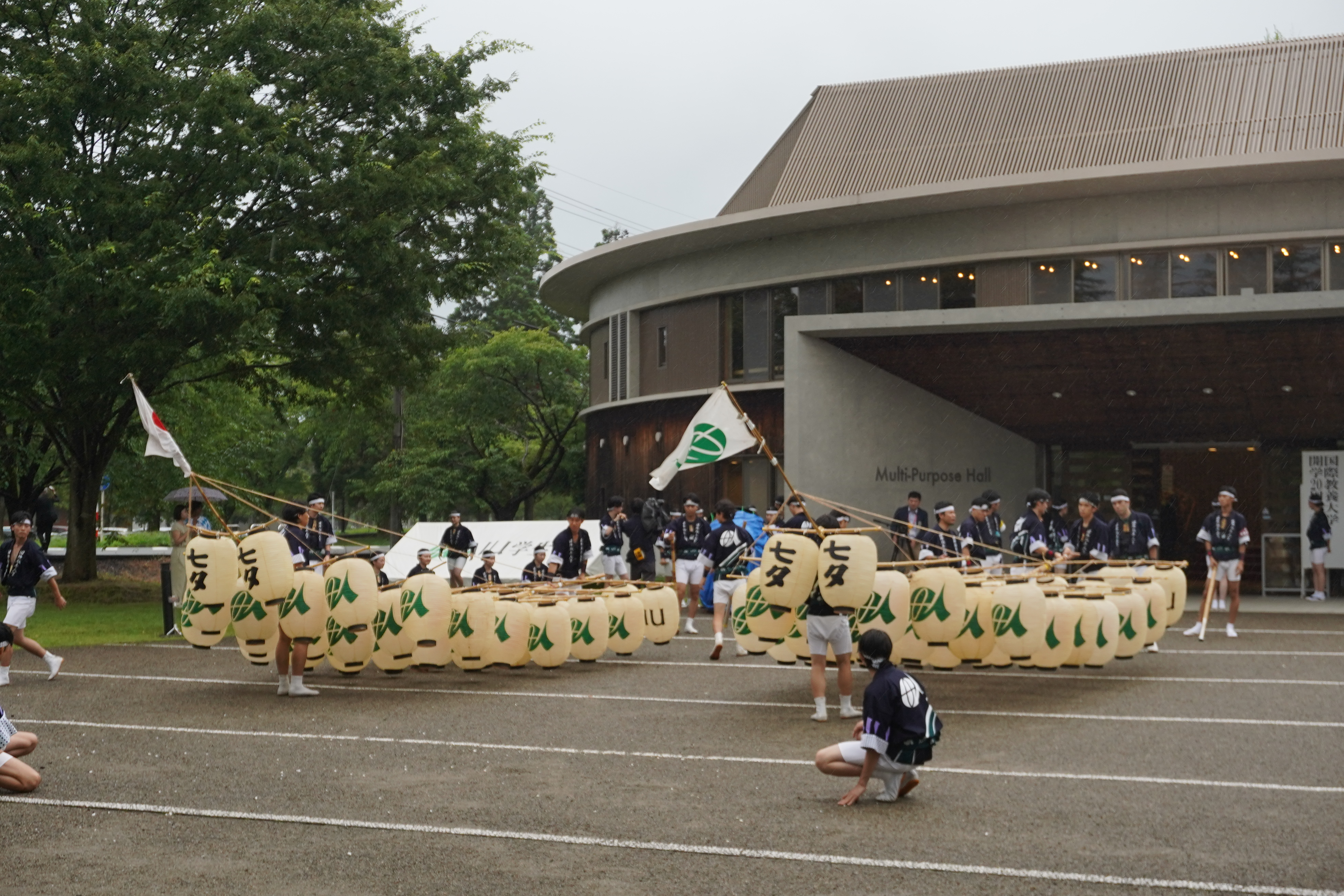
The Kanto Club performing

AIU offers a range of student organizations open to all students. The university has more than 45 different clubs and circles. They're organized into four categories: Cultural Activities Clubs, Global Understanding and Languages, Sports Clubs, and Music and Dance.

AIU organizes field trips for students including to the Oga Peninsula, Akita city, Gojōme, and Yuzawa.

The Division of Community Outreach arranges various activities with the local community.

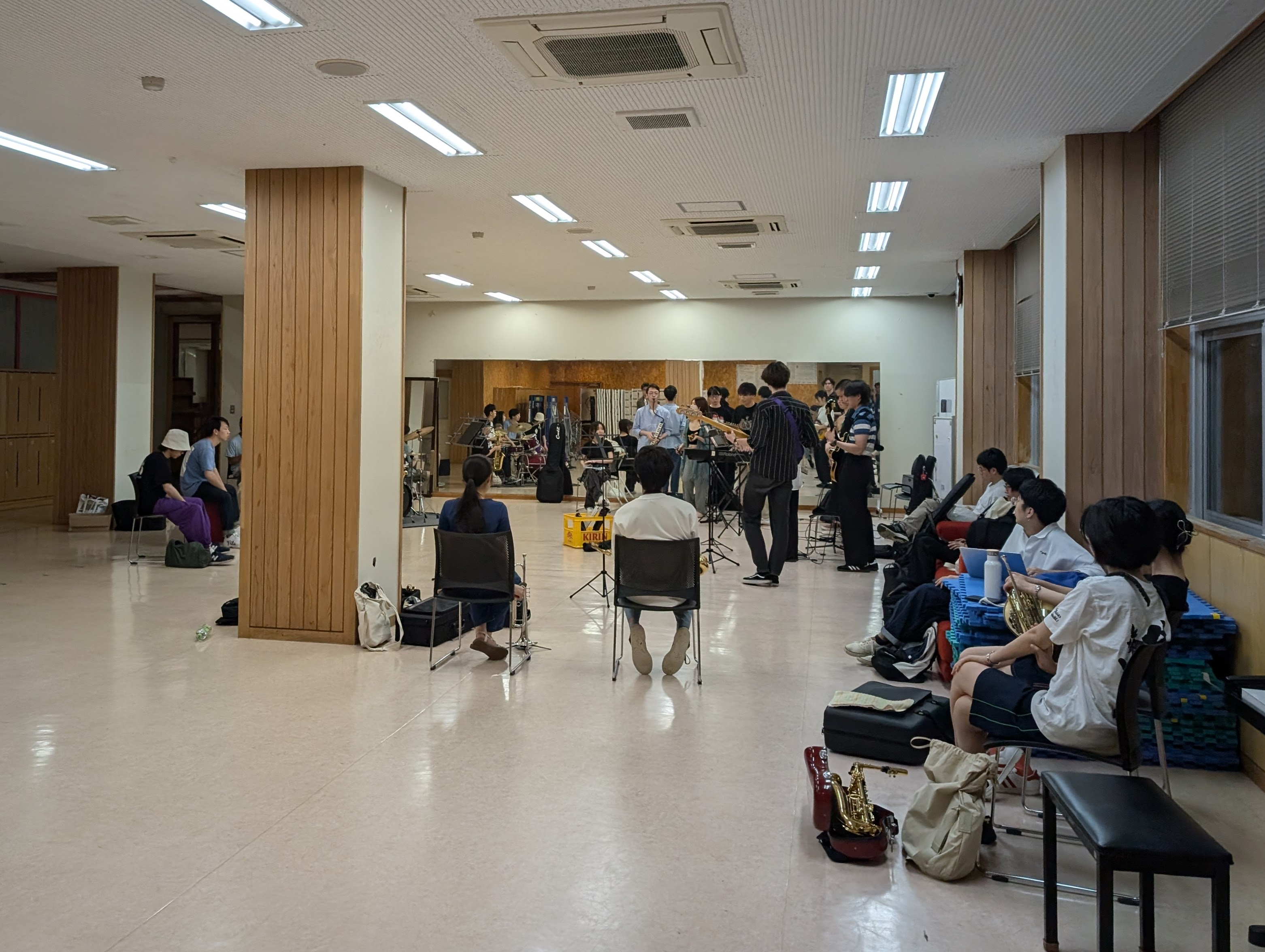
Students rehearsing for a show

International students interact with elementary and junior high school students in rural areas of Japan. Students can engage in activities such as rice planting and harvesting with schools and farming communities, testing and evaluating new local tourism programs, cooking local and international dishes with schools and community groups, and helping the Shiraiwa community set up and hold its annual winter festival.

Students have reported mixed experiences, with the university's isolated location fostering close-knit community but also drama. Due to a mandatory one-year study abroad requirement for undergraduates, the student body sometimes feels transient; because students usually study abroad in their junior years, slang does not last long and sophomores often lead clubs rather than upperclassmen.

Recruiters from major Japanese corporations regularly visit the university despite its rural location.

== Publications ==
Since 2023, AIU has been producing an annual peer-reviewed research publication called the Journal of Liberal Arts, Technology & Science. It's the result of a merger that combined two publications: the Akita International University Global Review and Journal of the Institute for Asian Studies and Regional Collaboration.

In 2010, the university began to publish student work annually in the Student Journal of International Liberal Arts. Content includes academic research, creative writing, art, and essays.

== Rankings and distinctions ==
AIU was 10th overall, 1st for environment, and 2nd for engagement in the Times Higher Education Japan University Rankings for 2025.

In 2011, AIU received a grant for the Re-Inventing Japan Project from MEXT (Ministry of Education, Culture, Sports, Science and Technology in Japan), the first case for Japanese Public University.

== Mascot ==
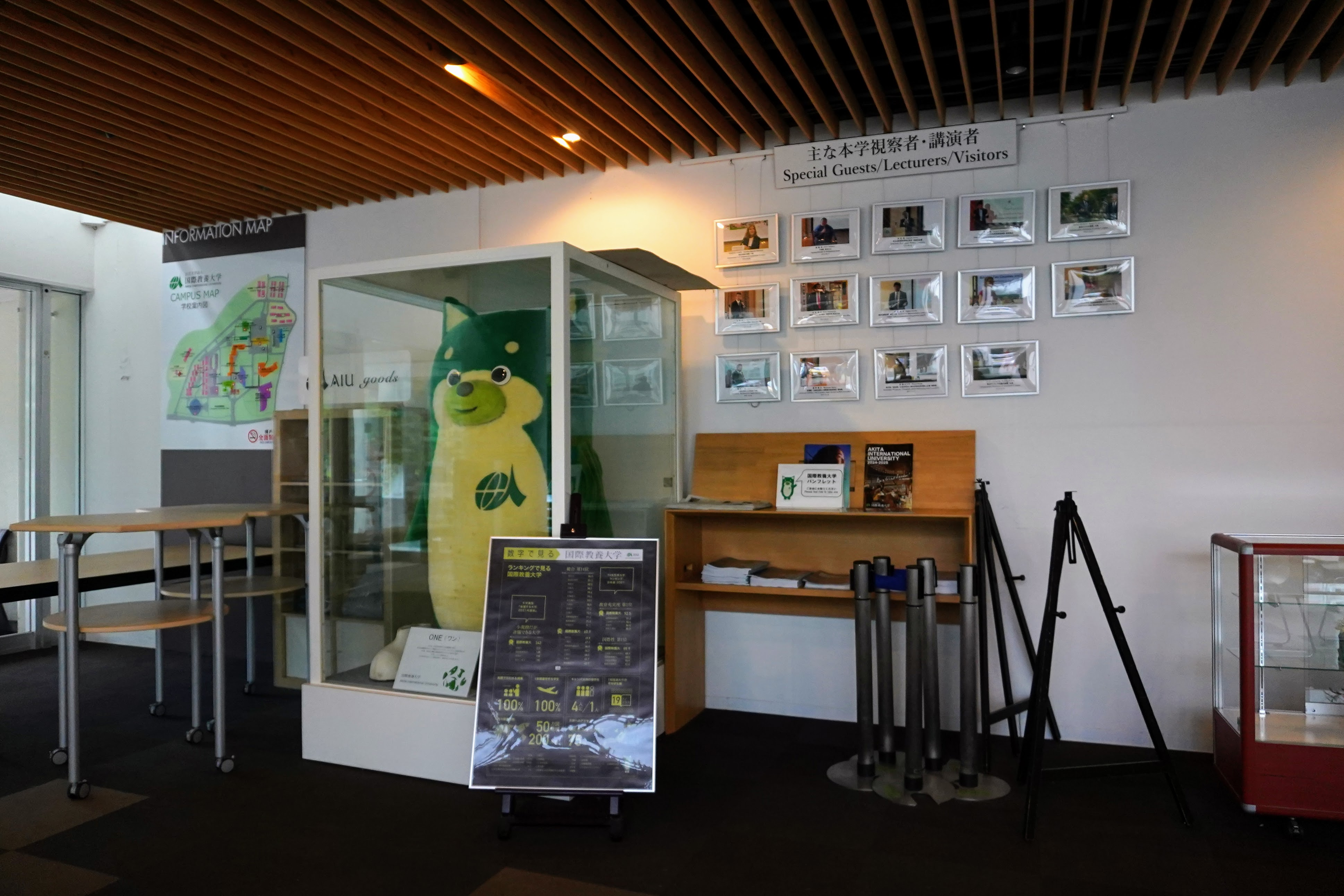
A display case showing the university's mascot, ONE

The mascot, ONE, is based on the Akita dog. According to the university, "The origin of the name is the combination of the University being 'on the cutting edge and the number one' and the sound of a dog’s bark ('wan' in Japanese)."
