= Ruchira Wijesena =

Sri Lankan materials scientist

Ruchira N. Wijesena
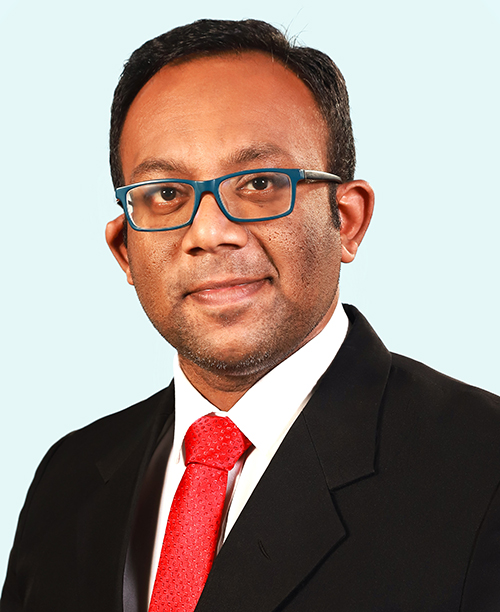
- Born: Sri Lanka
- Education: University of Moratuwa BSc Eng; University of Colombo PhD; Nalanda College Colombo
- Known for: Research on Chitin nanofibers and textile applications
- Scientific career
- Fields: Materials Science; Nanotechnology; Textile Engineering
- Workplaces: Institute of Technology, University of Moratuwa; Sri Lanka Institute of Nanotechnology (SLINTEC)
- Thesis: Synthesis and Applications of Chitin Nanofibers
- Doctoral advisor: Prof. K.M. Nalin de Silva

Ruchira Nalinga Wijesena is a Sri Lankan materials scientist and academic researcher. He holds a BSc Eng (Hons) in Textile Process & Engineering from the University of Moratuwa and a PhD in chemistry from the University of Colombo, where his doctoral research focused on chitin nanofibers under Prof. K.M. Nalin de Silva.

Wijesena serves as Senior Lecturer at the Institute of Technology, University of Moratuwa. He is a named inventor on multiple patents related to textile nanotechnology, including US Patent 10259191B2 for moisture management fabric technology.

He operates a YouTube channel presenting science and mathematics concepts in Sinhala.

== Education ==
Wijesena completed his Bachelor of Science in engineering (BSc Eng - Hons) in Textile Process & Engineering from the University of Moratuwa between 2005 and 2010.

He earned his Doctor of Philosophy (PhD) in Chemistry from the University of Colombo, with research on the synthesis, characterization, and applications of chitin nanofibers under the supervision of Prof. K.M. Nalin de Silva. His doctoral work involved extraction and characterization of chitin nanofibers from Portunus pelagicus (blue swimmer crab) shells.

== Career ==
Wijesena worked at the Sri Lanka Institute of Nanotechnology (SLINTEC) from 2010, progressing from Research Scientist to Senior Research Scientist, and later served as Science Group Leader and Engineering Manager for Research & Development.

He joined the Institute of Technology, University of Moratuwa as Senior Lecturer, where he teaches and supervises research in materials science, nanotechnology, and textile engineering.

== Patents ==
Wijesena is a co-inventor on several patents related to nanotechnology applications in textiles. His primary patent, US10259191B2 titled "Moisture management fabric," was filed in September 2013 and granted by the United States Patent and Trademark Office in April 2019. The patent describes multi-layered textile systems incorporating nanoparticle dispersions and nanofibers for moisture transport in sportswear applications.
