= Ritsumeikan Asia Pacific University =

Higher Education Institution in Ōita Prefecture, Japan

Coordinates: 33°20′14″N 131°28′06″E

Ritsumeikan Asia Pacific University (APU)
- 立命館アジア太平洋大学 (Ritsumeikan Ajia Taiheiyō Daigaku)
- Motto: Freedom, Peace, and Humanism, International Mutual Understanding and the Creation of the Future of the Asia Pacific
- Type: Private
- Established: April 2000
- Affiliations: AACSB, AMBA
- President: Hiroshi Yoneyama (2024–)
- Students: 6,699 (as of May 1, 2026)
- Location: Beppu, Ōita, Japan
- Website: www.apu.ac.jp

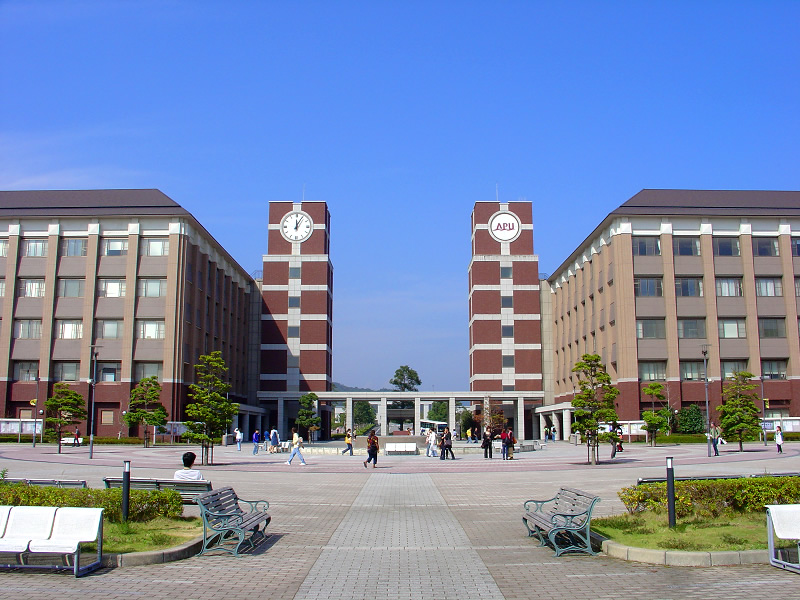
Ritsumeikan Asia Pacific University

Ritsumeikan Asia Pacific University (立命館アジア太平洋大学, Ritsumeikan Ajia Taiheiyō Daigaku), commonly referred to as APU, is a private university in Beppu, Ōita, Japan. APU was established in 2000 through the collaboration of three parties from the public and private sectors: Ōita Prefecture, Beppu City, and the Ritsumeikan Trust.

The university has a student body of about 5,850, including approximately 2,900 domestic, and 2,900 international students (a 50–50 domestic-international ratio) originating from 90 countries and regions. Half of the 172 full-time faculty members are also foreign nationals who come from more than 30 countries and regions.

== Location ==
The Ritsumeikan Asia Pacific University is located in Beppu, Ōita, on the island of Kyushu in southern Japan.

== Background ==
Ritsumeikan Asia Pacific University is a member of the Ritsumeikan Trust which includes APU, Ritsumeikan University in Kyoto and Lake Biwa and primary, junior and senior high schools throughout Japan. In the early 1990s the concept of creating an international university in the city of Beppu was first raised by the governor of Ōita Prefecture, Morihiko Hiramatsu, with the then chancellor of the Ritsumeikan Trust in Kyoto, Mr Kawamoto. A chief proponent of the concept and design was Professor Makitaro Hotta. The university opened at Jumonjibaru, north of Beppu City in April 2000.

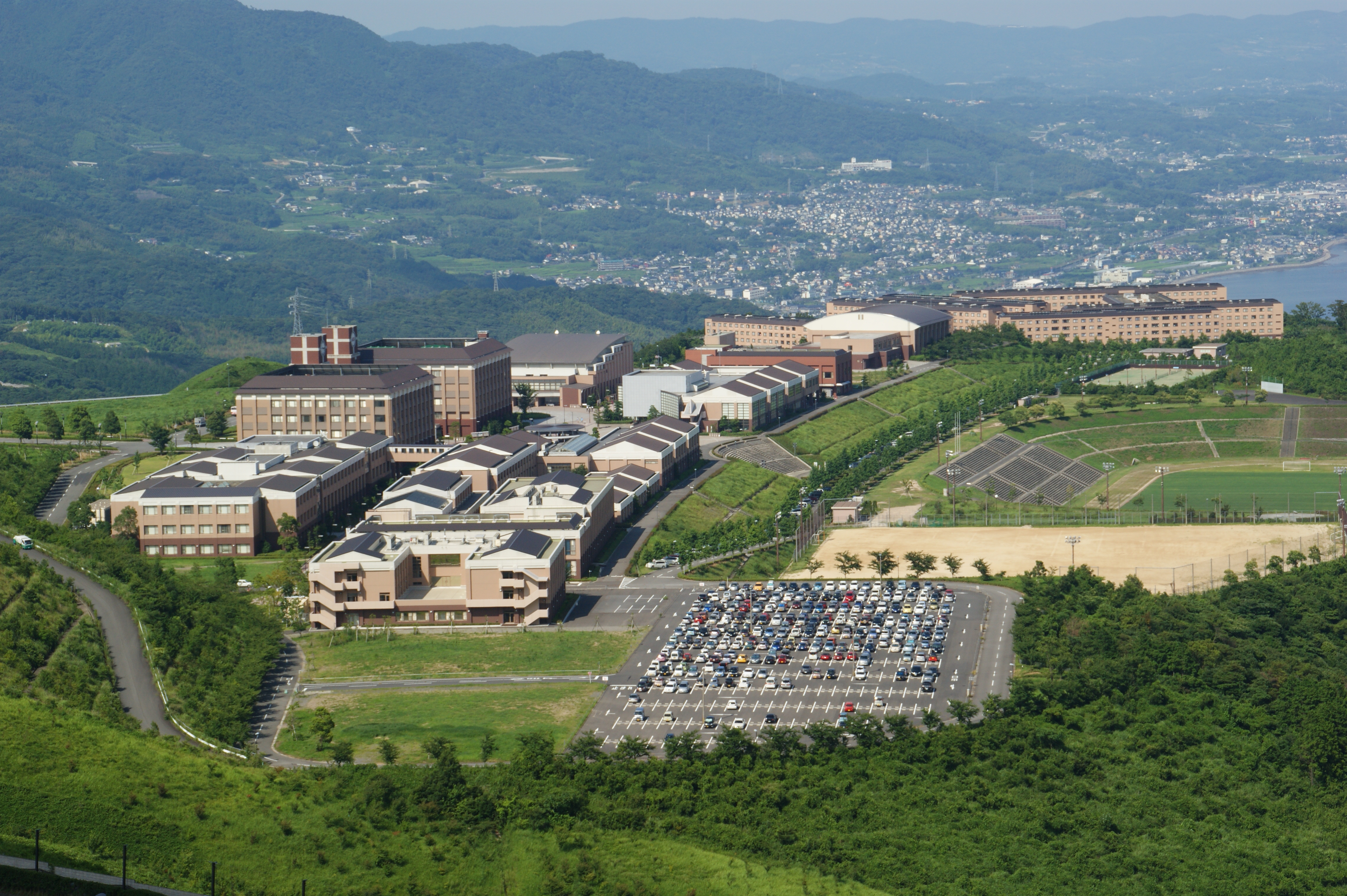
View of Ritsumeikan Asia Pacific University campus with surrounding landscape

The university was founded on the ideals of "freedom, peace, humanity, international mutual understanding, and the future shape of the Asia-Pacific region." The school's tagline "Shape Your World" was created in 2008 to evoke the image of students coming from all over the world to creating oneself as well as the world.

== Campus features ==
=== Programs ===
APU has 3 colleges:

- College of Asia Pacific Studies.
- College of International Management.
- College of Sustainability and Tourism (from Academic Year 2023).

The academic program is offered based on 2 semesters, and each semester is divided into two quarters lasting for seven weeks. In general, most of the classes in APU are carried out on a quarter system. Unlike many other universities in Japan, students are enrolled and graduate twice a year, in spring and fall semester.

APU offers undergraduate studies in subjects including liberal arts such as media studies, language subjects, and Japanese traditional arts. It offers special lecture subjects, which are added to and may change every semester. Students select their own classes and are not restricted to classes in their majors. However, students can only choose classes in their respective curriculum according to their enrollment year, for the curriculum has undergone changes three times since the university was founded.

From academic year 2000 up to 2022, undergraduate programs are conducted in the College of International Management and College of Asia Pacific Studies. The College of International Management (APM) consists of four areas of study:

- Accounting and Finance
- Marketing
- Strategic Management and Organization
- Innovation and Economics

The College of Asia Pacific Studies (APS) has also established four areas of study:

- Environment & Development,
- Hospitality & Tourism
- International Relations & Peace Studies
- Culture, Society & Media

Furthermore, students must complete compulsory language education credits in either English or Japanese.

Specialized post-graduate programs are conducted in the Graduate School of Asia Pacific Studies and Graduate School of Management. The graduate programs are conducted exclusively in English.

=== Japanese-English bilingual education system ===
APU practices a bilingual education system in English and Japanese, in a multicultural and multilingual environment in which about half of the teachers are foreign nationals. In the 1st and 2nd year, students will study foundational education in their standard language (English or Japanese) and at the same time work on acquisition of the other language. By the 3rd and 4th years, all students will develop linguistic performance ability to receive specialized education in both Japanese and English. Handouts and notices will be written in both Japanese and English, and guidance will be given in Japanese and English.

=== CLE (Center For Language Education) ===
In addition to regular programs in Japanese and English, the Center for Language Education offers six languages of the Asia-Pacific region with a curriculum that is linked to programs such as active learning.

=== Asia Pacific Language ===
Six languages in the Asia-Pacific region are offered, from introductory to advanced, in Chinese, Korean, Malay / Indonesian, Spanish, Thai, and Vietnamese. In APU, these are called the "AP languages."

=== Enrollment ===
As of 1 November 2016, the university has a total enrollment of around 5,850 students, down from the 2009 figure of 6,162. Currently there are 5,553 students in undergraduate programs, 178 at postgraduate level, and 117 non-degree students. The students are equally distributed between APU's two schools, the College of Asia Pacific Studies (2,786), and the College of International Management (2,731).

While 2,904 of these students are domestic Japanese, 2,944 (about 50.3%) are international students from 90 countries and regions. This ratio is a feature unique to APU amongst Japanese universities; APU is second only to Waseda University in the absolute number of international students enrolled. In terms of country of origin, the majority of international students come from Southeast Asia, namely Myanmar (474 as of 1 May, 2025), Indonesia (400), China (315), Korea (277), Thailand (224), and Bangladesh (223).

=== Facilities ===
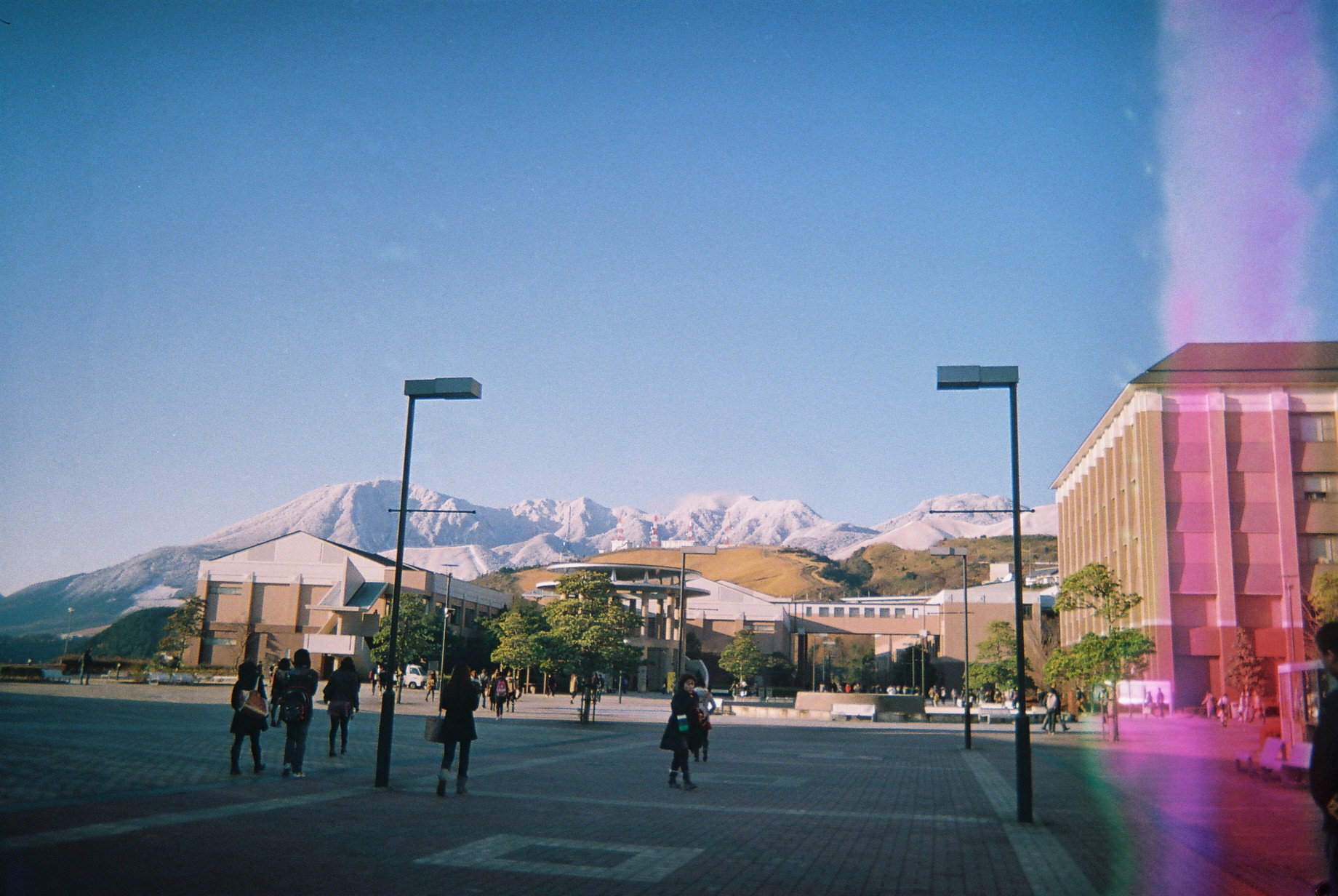
Ritsumeikan Asia-Pacific University, Campus View, January 2012

The library provides paper-based as well as electronic media including, academic databases, magazines, newspaper, textbooks, and DVD. Visitors can request media from other Ritsumeikan campuses which will be delivered to the library counter. Recently the library has included other services such as a writing center and meeting spaces for collaborative work.

=== Extracurricular activities ===
There are over 100 student organizations (known as clubs or circles) available at APU, which cover categories of sports, academic research, arts, and social organizations (such as volunteers). Students are free to join clubs they are interested in, and they can create new ones, too. Examples of student organizations include APU Yosshakoi (Japanese traditional dance group), PRENGO (volunteer group), APU Wind Orchestra, Muay Thai (Thai boxing), and Global Business Leader. Since 2015, APU has also been host to the Global Business Case competition.

=== On-campus housing ===
The on-campus housing, AP House, offers international students the opportunity to live next to the campus for their first year as they learn the ways and customs of life in Japan. Single and shared rooms are available. AP house provides shared facilities and borrowable items to the residents. Support faculty and staff members are on site, in addition to resident assistants (RA) recruited from the resident student body. RAs play an important role at AP House by supporting residents and promoting interaction and exchange. They also hold some events such as AP House Entrance Ceremony & Welcome Dinner Party and The AP House "World Festival."

=== Offices ===
Japan

- Tokyo Office
- Ritsumeikan Osaka Campus

Overseas

- Office of Korea
- Ritsumeikan Liaison Office located in Shanghai Jiao Tong University (立命館上海交通大学連絡処)
- Office of Taiwan (台湾弁事処)
- Office of Indonesia
- Office of Thailand
- Office of Vietnam

== Notable alumni and faculty ==
Presidents

- Kazuichi Sakamoto (January 2000 – March 2004)
- Monte Cassim (April 2004 – December 2009)
- Shun Korenaga (January 2010 – December 2017)
- Haruaki Deguchi (January 2018 – December 2023)
- Hiroshi Yoneyama (January 2024 – present)

Alumni

- Kosuke Enomoto (Kyoto / Kyotanabe City Councilor / April 2019–)
- Emil Dardak (Deputy Governor of East Java, Indonesia / February 2019–)
- Dissa Ahdanisa (Indonesia, Social Entrepreneur)
- Sei Sugama (cubist)
- Yuho Hayase (TV Oita Reporter)
- Vaughan Allison (Music Promoter)
- Andra Dasaad (Musician)
- Arkaanu Dhiyaa (Musician)

== See also ==
- Ritsumeikan University
