= Institute of Technology, University of Moratuwa =

Coordinates: 06°48′31″N 79°59′35″E

- තාක්ෂණික ආයතනය, මොරටුව විශ්වවිද්‍යාලය தொழில்நுட்பவியல் நிறுவனம், மொறட்டுவைப் பல்கலைக்கழகம்
- The emblem of University of Moratuwa
- Motto: Sanskrit: विद्यायेव शर्वधनम (Vidyaayev Sharvadhanam)
- Motto in English: Wisdom is all Wealth
- Type: Public
- Established: 2000
- Parent institution: University of Moratuwa
- Affiliations: University Grants Commission
- Chancellor: Prof. K. K. Y. W. Perera
- Director: Major General(Rted.) S.K. Thirunavukarasu RSP VSV USP
- Location: Diyagama, Sri Lanka
- Campus: Suburban
- Website: itum.mrt.ac.lk

The Institute of Technology, University of Moratuwa (Sinhala: තාක්ෂණික ආයතනය, මොරටුව විශ්වවිද්‍යාලය, Tamil: தொழில்நுட்பவியல் நிறுவனம், மொறட்டுவைப் பல்கலைக்கழகம்) (informally NDT) is an engineering college of the University of Moratuwa located in Diyagama, Sri Lanka. It awards the National Diploma in Technology.

== History ==
The Ceylon College of Technology (CCT) was thus established at Katubedda in 1966 which offered a practically oriented engineering diploma (Diploma in Technology, abbreviated to DipTech) equivalent to a degree which was developed and offered with the technical assistance of UNESCO. The CCT commenced with specializations in Civil Engineering, Electrical Engineering, and Mechanical Engineering, initially utilizing the physical facilities available at the IPT. The IPT continued in the same premises with its full-time courses, but was amalgamated with the CCT in 1967 and the JTO course was restructured and named as the Technician's course. Arising of a perceived need to separate technical education at lower than degree level from the main university, the Institute of Technology University of Moratuwa (ITUM) was established with effect from 10 March 2000 to conduct the National Diploma in Technology course separately from the Faculty of Engineering, with the Ordinance for the same having been gazetted in August 2000. The present ITUM has been relocated to its new building compound at Homagama, Diyagama with the state of the art laboratories and other facilities for the students of this institute under the University of Moratuwa.

== Organisation and administration ==
ITUM is administrated by the Board of Management headed by director. The present director is Major General(Rted.) S.K. Thirunavukarasu RSP VSV USP since 16 February 2021. Affiliated institute is the University Grants Commission.

== The diploma ==
A fully-fledged diplomate is initially expected to function as the link between the professional Engineer or Manager and the workforce at the field/shop level. This role requires a diplomate to develop professionally and improve his communication and managerial skills.

Following discipline of fields are available in ITUM.

- Chemical Engineering Technology
- Civil Engineering Technology
- Electrical Engineering Technology
- Electronics & Telecommunication Engineering Technology
- Information Technology
- Marine Engineering Technology.
- Mechanical Engineering Technology
- Nautical Studies
- Polymer Technology
- Textile and Clothing Technology

The course consists of a two- year academic study period and one-year industrial training. The first-year subjects are designed mainly to equalize, consolidate and improve the students' knowledge in basic sciences and to introduce the specialized discipline of study to which he/she has been selected. It will also give exposure to some basic skills required in engineering practice (e.g. workshop Technology Engineering Drawing). Each discipline offers one or more field subject/s of the students chosen field of study. (e.g.) Civil Engineering Department offers Building Construction for the Civil Engineering stream)

The second-year subjects mainly include the application of various engineering phenomena in the selected field of study.

The third-year has been allocated for obtaining the required hands-on experience in the industry. Training at the accepted industrial establishments is organized and monitored by the National Apprenticeship and Industrial Training Authority (NAITA) and the Lecturer in charge of Industrial Training at the ITUM.

At the end of the three years of education and training, the successful students are awarded the National Diploma in Technology with an Ordinary, Credit or Distinction pass, as per the performance criteria approved by the university.

The new academic curriculum now in operation at the ITUM was introduced in the year 2017.

=== Admissions ===
The admission to the NDT programme is done through a unique process. Applications are invited by a public advertisement in the government gazette, selected newspapers and the website. The students from three past consecutive G.C.E Advanced levels are eligible to apply. Students are selected on the basis of Z‐Scores and the aptitude test results.
