= Melbourne International Comedy Festival =

Annual comedy festival in Melbourne, Australia

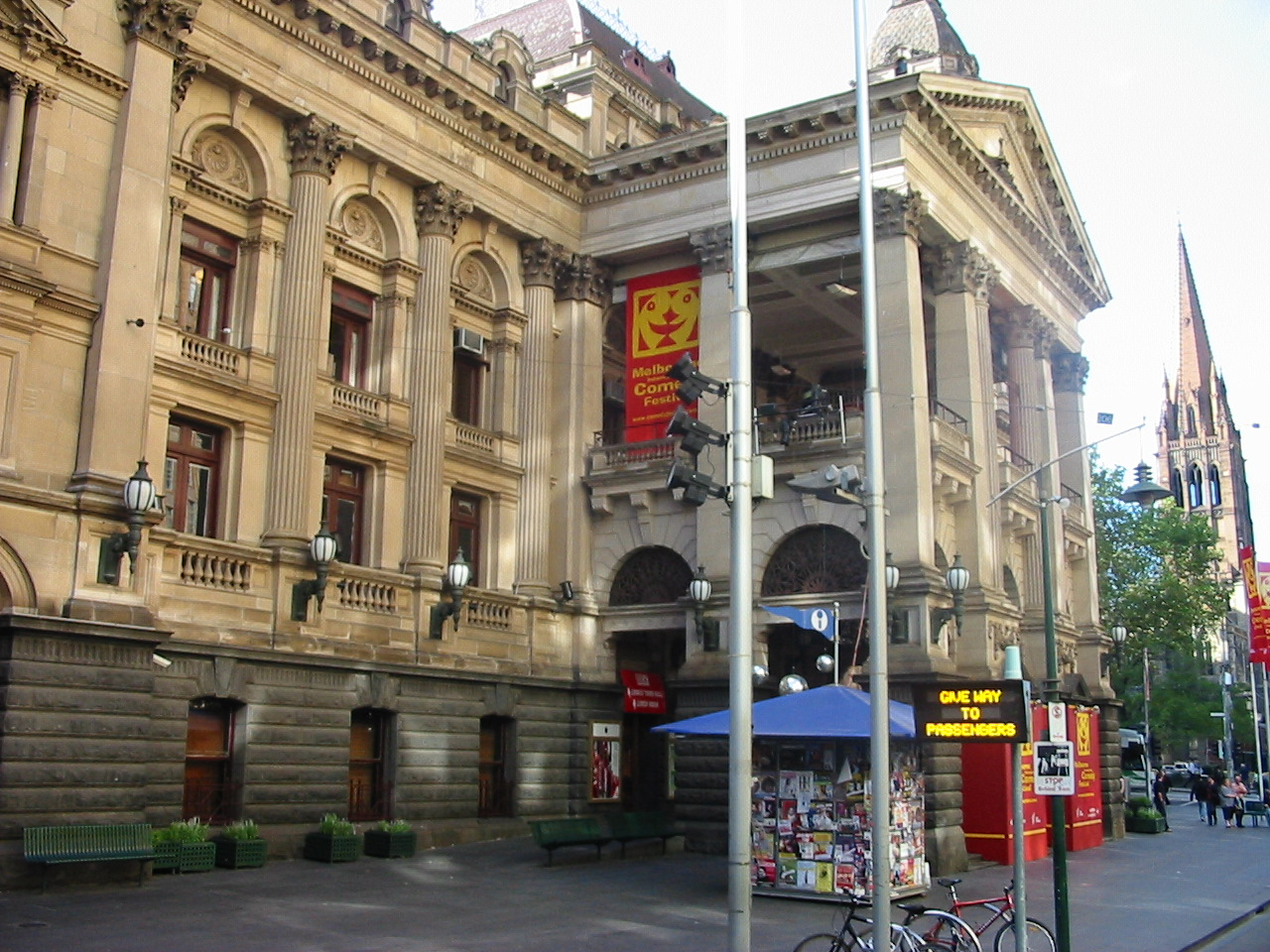
- Melbourne Town Hall serves as a hub for MICF, and a venue for many shows
- Genre: Comedy festival
- Frequency: Annually
- Locations: Melbourne, Victoria, Australia
- Years active: 39
- Inaugurated: 1987
- Attendance: 776,737 (2019)
- Website: www.comedyfestival.com.au/

The Melbourne International Comedy Festival (MICF) is the largest stand-alone comedy festival and the largest international comedy festival in the world. First held in 1987, it takes place annually in Melbourne over four weeks, typically starting in March and running through to April. The Melbourne Town Hall has served as the festival hub, but performances are held in many venues throughout the city.

MICF also produces three flagship development programs: Raw Comedy, Australia's biggest open mic competition; Class Clowns, a national comedy competition for high school students; and Deadly Funny, an Indigenous comedy competition that celebrates the unique humour of Indigenous Australians. Awards are given for the best acts of the development programs as well as other categories of performances. The festival also undertakes an annual national roadshow, showcasing festival highlights in regional towns across Australia.

== History ==
The festival was founded in 1986 by John Pinder and his business partner Roger Evans. According to Pinder, the idea of holding an international comedy festival originated in the early 1980s. In 1986, Pinder persuaded the Victorian Tourism Commission to fund an overseas trip in order to visit other international comedy festivals and investigate the possibility of holding a festival in Melbourne. Pinder became convinced it would work, and after his return he wrote a report for the state government, which they accepted. The inaugural festival was launched in 1987 at a media conference hosted by Barry Humphries (as Sir Les Patterson) and Peter Cook.

Traditionally the festival would open on or around April Fool's Day (1 April), though it now generally begins in mid-to-late March and runs for roughly four weeks. Its first year, in 1987, featured 56 separate shows, including performances by the Doug Anthony All Stars, Wogs Out of Work, Gerry Connolly, Los Trios Ringbarkus, and Rod Quantock. By 1999, it contained over 120 shows and was being attended by some 350,000 patrons annually. In 2010, it played host to a record (at the time) 369 shows and 4,947 performances both local and international, including artists from the US, Canada, the UK, Ireland and China. In addition, it achieved an attendance of over 508,000 and its highest-ever box office revenue of A$10.9 million, ranking it as Australia's largest cultural event. Activities were originally centred around the Universal and Athenaeum Theatres but in the early 1990s, the MICF shifted its venue to the newly refurbished Melbourne Town Hall, which has remained the festival hub. Soon after this, it spread out further to include an independently produced program at the Melbourne Trades Hall as well. In 2010, for the first time, the Festival also ran the Trades Hall venue.

In 2006, the opening of the festival was delayed due to the Festival Melbourne that occurred as part of the 2006 Commonwealth Games held in Melbourne.

The 2020 festival was cancelled in its entirety due to concerns surrounding COVID-19 and the extension of restrictions relating to efforts to stem the spread of the pandemic in Australia.

== Description ==
The MICF generally begins in mid-to-late March and runs for roughly four weeks. It is one of the three largest international comedy festivals in the world, behind Edinburgh's Fringe Festival and ahead of Montreal's Just For Laughs.

Although it is mainly a vehicle for stand-up and cabaret acts, its programme has also featured sketch shows, plays, improvisational theatre, debates, musical shows, and art exhibitions.

There is also a tradition for experimenting with unusual comedy venues, such as Rod Quantock's "Bus" tours and the similar "Storming Mount Albert By Tram", which used buses and trams respectively as mobile theatres in which the audience members were also passengers.

The MICF plays host to hundreds of local and international artists; in 2018, the festival listed over 550 shows and 6,700 performances (including more than 160 free performances) by 3,500 artists.

The televised Gala is one of the festival's flagship event, showcasing short performances from many headline and award-winning comics. Other popular events include The Great Debate (a televised comedy debate), the Opening Night Super Show, and Upfront, a night of performances exclusively featuring female comedians.

The Moosehead Benefit is held on the last night of the festival to raise funds for the Moosehead Awards, which provide grants to support emerging comedians.

Following the end of the festival in Melbourne various local and international comedians join the MICF Roadshow, which spends several months touring regional Australia and in 2010, Singapore.

== Special events ==
In addition to over 200 nightly shows which play during the festival, there are a number of special one-off events. The best-known of these is the Comedy Festival Gala, which showcases short acts from many headlines and award-winning comedians performing shows at that year's festival. It has become known as the festival's flagship event and typically sells out months in advance. It is typically hosted by well-known popular comedians. Headline acts at the Gala have included world-famous comics Arj Barker, Eddie Ifft, Adam Hills, Russell Kane, Stephen K Amos, Mike Wilmot and Rich Hall. The Gala is filmed and broadcast at a later date during the festival on the ABC. Since 1995 the Gala has been a charity event, with all proceeds from the live performance and the screening going to Oxfam Australia.

The Great Debate has been an annual event since 1989 and has been televised variously on Network Ten, Nine Network and currently airs on ABC. The comedy debate features two teams of comedians facing off loosely in the structure of a formal debate over humorous topics such as "Laughter is Better Than Sex", "Coming First is All That Matters" and "Food is better than sex". The winning team is chosen by audience applause. Since 1994, the festival has produced Upfront, a night exclusively featuring female comedians which routinely sells out.

== Awards ==
Each year, the MICF ends its Melbourne run by recognising the most outstanding shows and performers with a series of awards.

The Age Critics' Award was presented to the best local act between 2001 and 2010, as selected by reviewers at the Melbourne newspaper The Age.

The award for the most outstanding show of the festival is the Melbourne International Comedy Festival Award. It was previously called the Barry Award, after comedian Barry Humphries. However, after comments by him about transgender people, including describing transness as "a fashion", organisers removed Humphries' name from the prize in 2019.

The Golden Gibbo was established in 2004 in honour of Australian comedian Lynda Gibson, who died of cancer in 2004. It celebrates a local, independent act that "bucks trends and pursues the artist's idea more strongly than it pursues any commercial lure" The recipient of the Golden Gibbo receives A$3,500 in cash, and the Golden Gibbo statue ("which looks suspiciously like a bottle of shitty red wine"). The award is funded by the Moosehead Benefit, which is staged on the last night of the festival.

As of 2024 the other MICF awards include:

- Best Newcomer Award (since 2000), presented to the festival's best first-time performer as a part of its Emerging Talent Program; winner receives a trip to the Brighton Comedy Festival in Brighton, England
- Piece of Wood Award (since 1998), the comics' choice award; voted on by all previous winners; so named because the award is literally a piece of wood.
- Directors' Choice Award (since 2005); recognises an outstanding show that missed out on any other prize; awarded by the MICF director, in consultation with other visiting festival directors
- People's Choice Award (established in 2010 as the Bulmers People's Choice Award), determined by ticket sales
- Pinder Prize (since 2016); established in honour of New Zealand-born comedy producer John Pinder; supports a performer to travel to the Edinburgh Festival Fringe, where they can perform a show at Assembly Theatres, where Pinder was responsible for presenting many Australian comics
- RAW Comedy Award (since 1996); the result of a national open mic competition, with heats all over the country taking place from January each year, and culminating in the National Grand Final in Melbourne in April
- Deadly Funny Award (since 2007); for Aboriginal and Torres Strait Islander comics
- Class Clowns winner (since 1996); for secondary school students from Years 9–12
- Funny Tonne Award (since 2005); one for the fans: for "the person who saw the most festival shows and wrote the most reviews"

=== Mooseheads ===
In addition to the MICF awards, the Brian McCarthy Memorial Trust, which was established in 1987 in honour of Melbourne comedian, actor and fringe comedy producer Brian McCarthy, who died in an accident. Funds are raised by the Moosehead Benefit on the last night of MICF, and the trust gives grants to help support emerging comedians. In recent years it has supported up to six comedians each year by grants which pay the MICF registration fee, the first A$3,000 of venue rental, up to A$2,500 for creative support, and up to A$2,000 towards accommodation costs if the recipient lives outside of Melbourne.

== Advertising ==
From 1988 to 2018, cartoonist Michael Leunig designed the artwork for the festival program and other materials such as advertising posters. In 2019, Leunig was replaced by Judy Horacek, following his recent controversial works on vaccines and marriage equality. Horacek will remain as the illustrator for the festival until at least 2020.

== Views on the festival ==
Australian comic Peter Helliar says that performing in Melbourne is more fun for comedians because there is less pressure involved than in Edinburgh, where there is greater competition to gain an audience. Journalist Simon Fanshawe describes Melbourne as "the festival where the comedians go to play ... the most relaxed, least fevered and probably the most audience-friendly of all the festivals."

Lorin Clarke, a Melbourne-based writer and director of comedy theatre, suggested that shows self-produced by Australian comedians have great difficulty competing against shows featuring international comics which are produced by the Melbourne International Comedy Festival. Clarke argues that this conflict of interest stifles creativity.

== See also ==
- List of festivals in Australia
- Edinburgh Festival Fringe
- Just for Laughs
- Martin Martini and the Bone Palace Orchestra
