= National Diploma in Technology =

Three-year engineering program

National Diploma in Technology (NDT) is a three-year full-time (two years course study followed by one year industry based work training) engineering program for technologists. At present it is conducted by the Institute of Technology, University of Moratuwa.

== History ==
The National Diploma in Technology (NDT) program is intended to generate Incorporated Engineers . It was established in 1893 at Ceylon Technical Faculty, Maradana, called a Junior Technical Officers (JTO) course. In 1960 this program transferred to the Institute of Practical Technology (IPT) at Katubedda (presently the University of Moratuwa) and to the Hardy Senior Technological Institute at Ampara. The Course was held inside the katubedda premises of University of moratuwa until it is moved to new premises of the Institute of Technology to Diyagama premises of University of Moratuwa.

== Fields of Courses ==
1. Marine Engineering Technology
2. Nautical Studies &Technology
3. Chemical Engineering Technology
4. Civil Engineering Technology
5. Electrical Engineering Technology
6. Electronic & Telecommunication Engineering Technology
7. Mechanical Engineering Technology
8. Polymer Technology
9. Textile & Clothing Technology
10. Information Technology

== Selection procedure ==
Selection for the NDT program is especially based on the performance (z score) that student done at G.C.E Advanced Level exam and Institute's general knowledge exam.
