= Monte Cassim =

Sri Lankan academic

President (Chair of Board), Akita International University
- Incumbent
- Assumed office June 2020

[Senior Advisor, Ritsumeikan Trust]
- In office 2018- – 2023

Vice-Chancellor of the Ritsumeikan Trust
- In office 2004–2012

Chancellor of University of Moratuwa, Sri Lanka
- In office 2023–present

Personal details
- Born: 29 July 1947 (age 79) Colombo, Sri Lanka
- Education: University of Tokyo; University College Colombo; Royal College Colombo
- Profession: Academic

Monte Cassim (Ahmed Mumtaz Masoon Cassim) is a Sri Lankan academic. He is the President (Chair of Board) of Akita International University and from April 2004 until January 2010 was President of Ritsumeikan Asia Pacific University, Beppu, Japan where he remains Professor. From 2018-2023 he was Senior Advisor to the Ritsumeikan Trust and from 2028 - 2021 was the founding President, Trustee and Professor of Shizenkan University, Tokyo. On 17 December 2023, he was appointed as the Chancellor of the University of Moratuwa by President Ranil Wickremesinghe.

Educated in Sri Lanka at the Royal College, Colombo, he graduated from the University of Ceylon in 1970. After working as an architect for Valentine Gunasekerea's practice, he moved to Japan in 1971 as recipient of a Japan Ministry of Education postgraduate scholarship and gained a master's from the University of Tokyo’s Graduate School of Engineering in 1976. Thereafter started doctoral studies there.

Following his studies he worked for Mitsui Construction and for the AUR urban and regional planning practice in Tokyo before taking up a teaching position at the Universiti Sains Malaysia in Penang. He joined the United Nations Centre for Regional Development in Nagoya 1985 and worked there until 1994. That year he joined Ritsumeikan University as Professor in 1994 in the Faculty of International Relations (1994-1996) and the Faculty of Policy Science. His research centers on process analysis, systems design and knowledge management to develop “earth-friendly” and “human-friendly” technological solutions at Ritsumeikan’s Discovery Research Laboratory. He became President of Ritsumeikan Asia Pacific University (APU) and Vice-Chancellor of Ritsumeikan Trust in 2004.

Academic offices
Preceded by	Vice-Chancellor of the Ritsumeikan Trust and Professor, Ritsumeikan Asia Pacific University	Succeeded by
