= Martin Martini and the Bone Palace Orchestra =

6-piece band from Melbourne, Australia

Martin Martini and the Bone Palace Orchestra were a 6-piece Melbourne band. They mixed rock'n'roll together with jazz, blues, show-tunes, cabaret and comedy. They have played at the Sydney Opera House, London's Soho Theatre, Adelaide Cabaret Festival, Fringe Festival, The Famous Spiegeltent and were the house band for the Melbourne Comedy Festival.

== Members ==
- Martin Martini (keys, vocals)
- Sam Dunscombe (clarinet)
- James Macaulay (trombone)
- Peter Burgess (tuba)
- Natasha Rose (guitar)
- Jules Pascoe (bass)
- Arron Light (drums)
- Xani Kolac (violin)
- Nashua Lee (guitar)
- Ben Hendry (drums)

== Discography ==
- Live at the Famous Rainbow Hotel (2005)
- Dream Until You Die (2006)
- We're All Just Monkeys (2008)

== Awards ==
- Martin Martini and the Bone Palace Orchestra was nominated for a Green Room award.

== Trivia ==
- Martin Martini’s “tap” spectacular was first performed at the Famous Spiegeltent in March 2006 at the Adelaide Fringe Festival.
