= List of hospitals in Kalutara District =

The following is a list of hospitals in Kalutara District, Sri Lanka. The biggest government hospitals in the district, known as line ministry hospitals, are controlled by the central government in Colombo. All other government hospitals in the district are controlled by the provincial government in Colombo.

== Government hospitals ==
=== Central government hospitals ===
==== Teaching hospitals ====
- Teaching Hospital, Kalutara
- Maternity and Children's Hospital, Kalutara (Gallassa Maternity and Children's Hospital)

==== District General Hospitals ====
- District General Hospital,Horana

=== Provincial government hospitals ===
==== Base hospitals (type A) ====
- Panadura Base Hospital, Panadura

==== Base hospitals (type B) ====
- Agalawatta Base Hospital, Pimbura

==== Divisional hospitals (type A) ====
- Bandaragama Divisional Hospital, Bandaragama
- Ingiriya Divisional Hospital, Ingiriya
- Matugama Divisional Hospital, Matugama

==== Divisional hospitals (type B) ====
- Baduraliya Divisional Hospital, Baduraliya
- Bulathsinhala Divisional Hospital, Bulathsinhala
- Ittepana Divisional Hospital, Ittepana
- Meegahatenne Divisional Hospital

==== Divisional hospitals (type C) ====
- Gonaduwa Divisional Hospital, Morontuduwa

==== Other Government Hospitals ====
- PCH Dias Memorial Hospital for Women (Kethumathi Hospital), Panadura

== Private hospitals ==
- Family Care Hospital, Kalutara
- New Philip Hospital, Kalutara
- Sachithra Hospital, Panadura
- Medihelp Hospital, Horana
- MDK Hospital, Horana

== See also ==
- List of hospitals in Sri Lanka
