= Imagine Cup Sri Lanka =

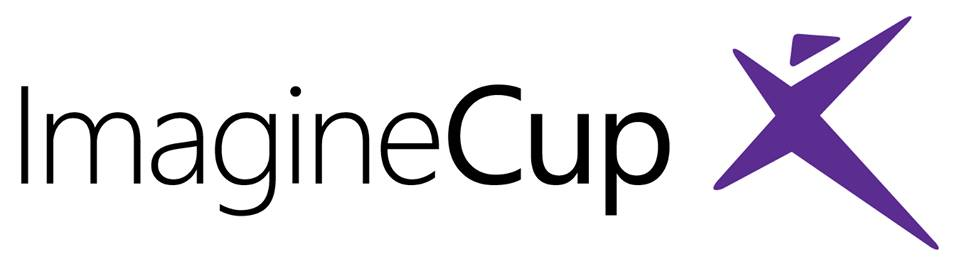
ImagineCup logo

Imagine Cup Sri Lanka is the annual competition sponsored by Microsoft Sri Lanka. It is the local round of competition to select teams to represent Sri Lanka at the international Imagine Cup competition sponsored and hosted by Microsoft Corp. Started in 2005, primarily a software design competition, it enlists teams of four within the high school and university levels to submit software solutions addressing a specifically provided theme.

== Winners ==
Past winners;

- 2005: Team SivuMithun, Faculty of Information Technology, University of Moratuwa
- 2006: Team Arunalu, Faculty of Information Technology, University of Moratuwa
- 2007: Team Sara, Faculty of Information Technology, University of Moratuwa
- 2008: Team Sasrutha, Faculty of Engineering/Faculty of Information Technology, University of Moratuwa
- 2009: Team Mahee , Sri Lanka Institute of Information Technology.....
- 2010: Team Collectivists, School of Computing, University of Colombo
- 2011: Team PeraSoft , Faculty of Engineering, University of Peradeniya
- 2012: Team Team V360, Faculty of Information Technology, University of Moratuwa
- 2013: Team Team Firebird , Informatics Institute of Technology.....
- 2014:
  - Innovation – Team Team Firebird, Informatics Institute of Technology
  - World Citizenship – Team Silver Chasers, Informatics Institute of Technology
- 2015:
  - Games – Dimension X, Informatics Institute of Technology
  - Innovation – Team DRUTA, Informatics Institute of Technology
  - World Citizenship – Team Firebird, Informatics Institute of Technology
- 2016:
  - Games – Team Bit Masters, Faculty of Engineering, University of Moratuwa
  - Innovation – Team Bit Masters, Faculty of Engineering, University of Moratuwa
- 2017: Team Team Titans, Faculty of Engineering, University of Moratuwa
- 2018: Team Team AlgoR, Faculty of Computing, Sri Lanka Institute of Information Technology | ESOFT Metro Campus

== Participants ==
- Asia Pacific Institute of Information Technology
- ESOFT Metro Campus
- Informatics Institute of Technology
- Open University of Sri Lanka
- Sabaragamuwa University of Sri Lanka
- Sri Lanka Institute of Information Technology
- University of Colombo
- University of Kelaniya
- University of Moratuwa
- University of Peradeniya
- University of Ruhuna

== Criticism ==
The Microsoft Corporation has been criticized for including provisions in the competition's legal documents, stating that by accepting their prizes, winners agree to allow Microsoft to use concepts, techniques, ideas or solutions from the winning applications "for any purpose." Also, the competition has been criticized for being rather Microsoft-centric, with demands such as "the entry must be designed on.NET Framework 2.0 using Microsoft Visual Studio" or "30% of the scoring in this round will be based on use of showcasing the.NET framework".

Microsoft's Rules and Regulations, however, contains a section stating that students' intellectual property will be respected, and that neither Imagine Cup competition nor Microsoft claim ownership of the materials provided by the competitors. It is important to highlight that for the sake of the judgment, internal elements of the solution might be made public to the judges.

== See also ==
- Imagine Cup
