= TurnOn (video game) =

2016 video game

- Developer: Brainy Studio LLC
- Publisher: Brainy Studio LLC
- Engine: Unity
- Platforms: Windows, OS X, Xbox One
- Release: June 1, 2016
- Genre: Platform
- Mode: Single-player

TurnOn is a single-player video game developed by Brainy Studio LLC. The game was released for Windows, OS X, and Xbox One on June 1, 2016. The main character is an alien electrical spark named Turnon, who must return electricity to the unexpectedly de-energized city. The game features a distinctive visual style and graphics, as well as the original story, became the second big project of Brainy Studio after WitchCraft, creating on Unity3D. In 2014 a prototype of TurnOn became the winner in the "Games" category in the world's largest technology competition, Imagine Cup 2014, held under the auspices Microsoft, and also became a participant of the biggest in the world support program for mobile apps and games developers, AppCampus.

The first of five announced episodes was launched at the beginning of 2015, later developers started Steam Greenlight campaign.

== Gameplay ==
The plot revolves around a small spark named Turnon, an alien space object, which flew through the atmosphere and accidentally struck the city's power station, where it came alive from the strong impact of the current and became a rational being. As a result of the accident the city remains without electricity, and now Turnon looks like a fireball with a pretty face, has to return the light back into the homes of citizens. Turnon strolls through the suburban areas, has fun at school parties and repairs the wiring in a private house visits the power station and restores the observatory, as well as fights with unexpected enemies.

Professor Brain, a scientist from the power station, found Turnon at the time of the accident and decided to help him. Using minibus equipped with an electric generator, they move around the city from one district to another and restore the power supply.

TurnOn has five episodes, where players explore the city and turn on the light everywhere it's possible or planned by the plot. There are two types of levels:

- Exploration levels, where players have to restore the city's power station, help a little girl to get home, repair the wiring in the private cottage, throw a school party, then visit an observatory and run a dron. Every chapter has a lot of situations without electricity, which should be found and resolved.
- Music levels, where you can climb to the high-voltage wires and moving in the rhythm of the music, collect positive charges avoid negative ones.
