= Centre for Postgraduate Studies, Informatics Institute of Technology =

Sri Lanka Institute of Information Technology is a private higher educational institute in Sri Lanka which specializes in Information Technology. It collaborates with foreign universities and allows students to follow those courses in Sri Lanka. The Centre for Postgraduate Studies or 'PG Centre' at IIT was started in 2001 with a collaboration with Keele University, England, to conduct Keele MSc programmes in Sri Lanka. More than 250 students have gained their MSc degree from Keele.

== Programmes ==
The Centre offers the following programmes locally:

=== Postgraduate ===
- MSc in IT & Management
- MSc in Project Management

These are two-years, part-time, dual specialization degrees to help IT professionals ascending the managerial ladder, and also helps non-IT professionals to enter the IT industry.

== Keele International Student Scholarship programme ==
PG Centre is the local representative body to place students to Keele for over 500 degree programmes. Keele University offers dual specialisation for an undergraduate degree, for example, BA in HRM & Law, or BA in HRM & Computer Science.

== £3000 scholarship for undergraduate/postgraduate programme ==
Students can apply for a scholarship anytime during the year.

== Postgraduate Centre facilities ==
- air-conditioned lecture halls with multimedia
- Library
- Table tennis
- Student Common Room
- Labs
- Wi-Fi Lounge for groupwork
- Swimming pool
