= Cisco Certified Entry Networking Technician =

The Cisco Certified Entry Networking Technician (CCENT) certification was the first stage of Cisco's certification system. The certification was retired on 24 February 2020. The CCENT certification was an interim step to Associate level or directly with CCNA and CCDA certifications. While the CCENT covered basic networking knowledge; it did not get involved with the more intricate technical aspects of the Cisco routing and switching and network design. The certification validated the skills essential for entry-level network support positions. CCENT qualified individuals have the knowledge and skill to install, manage, maintain and troubleshoot a small enterprise branch network, including network security. The CCENT curriculum covered networking fundamentals, WAN technologies, basic security, routing and switching fundamentals, and configuring simple networks. The applicable training was the Cisco ICND1 ("Interconnecting Cisco Network Devices, Part 1") and the exam was ("100-105" ICND1), costing $165 retail. The certification was valid for 3 years.

The CCENT qualifying exam, ICND1 was retired on 24 February 2020. Existing CCENT holders will continue to have active and valid CCENT certification 3 years from issue date.

== See also ==
- CCNA
- Cisco CCDA certification
