= Lalith Gamage =

Sri Lankan computer scientist

- Born: Sri Lanka
- Education: University of British Columbia, University of Leicester, University of Moratuwa; St. Aloysius' College, Galle
- Scientific career
- Fields: Computer science
- Workplaces: Sri Lanka Institute of Information Technology, University of British Columbia , University of Moratuwa

Lalith Gamage, MBCS, MIEE is a Sri Lankan academic. He is a professor, currently serving as the president and CEO of Sri Lanka Institute of Information Technology, a position he has held since the beginning of the institute in 1999. He has also served as the chairman of the Arthur C. Clarke Institute for Modern Technologies. As a leading Sri Lankan academic in the field of Computer Science, Prof Gamage has played an important role in the development of IT education, research and industry in Sri Lanka.

== Education and research ==
Educated at St. Aloysius College, Galle, Gamage gained his BSc in Engineering from the University of Moratuwa after which he gained and MSc from the University of Leicester and a PhD from the University of British Columbia. His research areas include computer vision, computational intelligence and robotics. Gamage has published numerous research papers and has won a prestigious Japanese Space Agency research award.

== Academic career ==
Joining University of Moratuwa as a lecturer Gamage went on to serve as a senior lecturer and the Director of the Computing Services Centre of the Moratuwa University. He has also served as a Council Member of the University of Moratuwa.

In 1999 he played a prominent role in establishing Sri Lanka Institute of Information Technology (SLIIT) becoming its CEO and a senior lecturer, in 2003 he was made a Professor of SLIIT. Under his tenure SLIIT has become the largest technology institute in Sri Lanka, of which he is the current president.

Currently he also serves as a visiting professor at the Department of Mechanical Engineering, University of British Columbia and is attached to the Industrial Automation Group and is also an adjunct professor of the Curtin University.

Apart from his academic he has served the IT industry and the Government of Sri Lanka in many capacities. These include the Chairman of the ICT Cluster of the USAID sponsored competitiveness initiative, the executive director of Trade Information Network, Sri Lanka Export Development Board, and Chairman of the IT Task Force, Ministry of Enterprise Development, Industrial Policy, and Investment Promotion.

== Awards ==
- The Outstanding Young Person award for his contribution towards academic development. - 2000
- Japanese Space Agency research award.
