= Dayan Rajapakse =

- Born: 8 October 1972 (age 53); Narammala, Kurunegala
- Other names: Chaminda
- Education: University of Colombo
- Alma mater: Maliyadeva College, Kurunegala
- Occupations: physician, teacher and businessman
- Organization: ESOFT Computer Studies
- Website: www.esoft.lk

Chaminda Dayan Rajapakse (born 8 October 1972) is a Sri Lankan physician, teacher, and businessman. He is the managing director of ESOFT Computer Studies Pvt Ltd (ESOFT), which is a private sector educational institute in Sri Lanka.

Educated at Maliyadeva College, Kurunegala; he graduated from the University of Colombo with a MBBS in 1999.

In the year 2000, he established ESOFT Computer Studies Pvt ltd., where he conducts lectures for several undergraduate programmes including the University of Colombo School of Computing BIT external Degree, and the BCS Higher Education Qualifications.

In 2009, he was elected to the post of Student Counselor of the Computer Society of Sri Lanka for which post he was re-elected for the year 2010. At the AGM held on 10 December 2010, Dr. Dayan was elected as a Council Member for the year 2011.

Another area of interest for him is the advancement of knowledge and learning among the young generation in Sri Lanka as he believes that this is the best way to develop Sri Lanka as a country.
