= Brainy Studio =

Brainy Studio LLC
- Type: Privately held company
- Industry: Video games
- Founded: 2013
- Headquarters: 614023, Russia, Perm, 122 Ekaterininskay str., Perm, Russia
- Area served: Worldwide
- Website: brainystudio.ru

Brainy Studio LLC is a Russian entertainment and independent video game development company, best known for developing the game TurnOn, with which has been won Imagine Cup 2014 in "Games" category held by Microsoft and other partners. The company's headquarters is located in Perm.

== History ==
Brainy Studio was founded in January 2013 by students of Perm National Research Polytechnic University: web-developer Evgenii Romin, programmer Anton Baranov and digital artist Ilya Antonov. In the same year they launched first game WitchCraft on Windows Phone platform, with which placed second at Imagine Cup Russia Finals in Moscow.

In 2014 company joined Unity-developer Alexander Frolov (left in summer of 2015) and marketeer Dmitri Ogorodnikov. In summer studio won in "Games" category of Imagine Cup International Finals with a prototype of the game TurnOn, and got the right to go to the AppCampus acceleration program, organized jointly by Microsoft and Nokia in the Finnish University of Aalto.

In February 2015 the company released the first demo episode of TurnOn for Windows Phone. The same year they began Steam Greenlight campaign. Full version will be launched on June 1 2016 on Xbox One (as a member of ID@Xbox) and in Steam (got Greenlit 17 April 2015).

== List of games released ==
- WitchCraft (2013), platforms: Windows Phone.
  - 2nd place at Imagine Cup Russia Finals 2013.
- Clumsy Sheep Lullaby (2014), platforms: iOS, Android, Windows Phone, Windows Store.
- Angry Bees (2014), platforms: iOS, Android, Windows Phone, Windows Store.
- TurnOn (2015), the first episode, platforms: Windows Phone.
  - 1st place in the "Games" category on the world's largest technology competition Imagine Cup 2014 in Seattle.
  - "Best Indie Game" at the conference for game developers and publishers DevGamm Moscow 2014.
  - 3rd place at the festival GamesJam Kanobu 2014 among 450 games.
  - Semi-finalist at the international competition Adobe Design Achievements Awards in Game Art and Design Nominees.
