= Sri Lanka Institute of Information Technology =

Private university in Sri Lanka

Coordinates: 6°54′52″N 79°58′20″E

- ශ්‍රී ලංකා තොරතුරු තා‌ක්ෂණ ආයතනය; இலங்கை தகவல் தொழில்நுட்ப நிறுவனம்
- Other name: SLIIT University
- Motto: Discover Your Future
- Slogan: The Knowledge University
- Type: Private
- Established: 1999; 27 years ago
- Founders: Kingsley Wickramaratne, Richard Pathirana
- Accreditation: UGC, IET
- Academic affiliations: Association of Commonwealth Universities; International Association of Universities; Royal Institution of Chartered Surveyors; RIBA; Institution of Engineers Australia; Institution of Engineering and Technology
- Chancellor: Lakshaman L. Rathnayake
- Vice-Chancellor: Lalith Gamage
- Faculty: 400
- Administrative staff: 200
- Students: 19,000
- Undergraduates: 16,000
- Postgraduates: 3,000
- Location: Malabe (Main Campus); Colombo (Metropolitan Campus); Pallekele (Kandy Campus), Sri Lanka
- Campus: Multiple Sites
- Campus size: Malabe, 10 ha (25 acres) Metro, 8 Floors
- Colors
- Website: www.sliit.lk

Sri Lanka Institute of Information Technology (Sinhala: ශ්‍රී ලංකා තොරතුරු තා‌ක්ෂණ ආයතනය; Tamil: இலங்கை தகவல் தொழில்நுட்ப நிறுவனம்; also known as SLIIT) is a non-profit private university located in Malabe, Colombo, and Pallekele, in Sri Lanka. It specialises in various academic and professional fields, such as computer science, information technology, and business management.

SLIIT has three campuses: the main one is based in Malabe, the second one (Metropolitan Campus) in Colombo, and the third one (Kandy Campus) in Pallekele. There are also four regional centers around the island. SLIIT is associated with several international universities such as University of Queensland, Curtin University, and Liverpool John Moores University. SLIIT offers more the 75 undergraduate and postgraduate degrees on a vast field, ranging from informatics to education. These degrees are either affiliated with a foreign university or offered by the SLIIT themselves accredited by the UGC.

SLIIT is one of the few Sri Lankan universities on the QS Asia University Rankings and Times Higher Education World University Rankings. It is the only non-state university to be named on both of the lists.

== History ==
=== Foundation ===
In the early 1990s with the rise of IT sector, professor Lalith Gamage, who would eventually be the first president of the Sri Lanka Institute of Information Technology, recognized the necessity of generating a substantial number of IT professionals in Sri Lanka to fulfill the increasing demand for such expertise. At the time, Gamage held the position of Senior Lecturer and was also the Director of the Computing Services Centre at the University of Moratuwa. He drafted a proposal for creating an institute of information technology within UoM and forwarded it to Hon. Kingsley Wickramaratne, who was the Minister of Internal and International Commerce and Food at that time. In June 1998, the Ministry of Education and Higher Education and the Ministry of Internal and International Commerce and Food jointly brought a proposal to the Cabinet to have the Malabe institute funded by the Mahapola Trust Fund and provided with land. The Chairman of the MTF, who was always the Chief Justice, was consulted on this matter. Although the Cabinet agreed to the project in principle, the Ministry of Finance expressed concerns about the lack of qualified academics to teach at the new institute and the financial burden it would place on the Consolidated Fund.

In 1999, Gamage requested a meeting with Mr. Wickramarathne, the Minister of Internal and International Commerce and Food, to discuss the creation of an institute. The meeting involved Ministry officials, professionals, and academics, and it was proposed to form a company limited by guarantee as an interim measure. This would allow for the project to move forward until cabinet approval was obtained, at which point the Government could take over the Institute and attach it to the University of Moratuwa.

=== Establishment of the Institute ===
The Sri Lanka Institute of Information Technology was established in 1999 at BOC Merchant tower, Colombo as a nonprofit company by guarantee with the ability to award Bachelor of Science degrees following amendments to the Universities Act the same year, thus gaining recognition from the Minister of Higher Education. SLIIT was established primarily to educate and train information technology professionals. SLIIT was established as an independent institution, as the initial guarantors did not represent any organization and the government or MTF did not have any ownership in it.

In September 1999, SLIIT commenced its operations by offering a two-year Diploma Programme at a leased space situated in its Colombo campus. The institute received a staggering 3,150 applications, out of which only 400 were granted admission.

=== Expansion in to the Malabe Campus ===
SLIIT approached the Mahapola Trust Fund to develop the Malabe Campus due to increasing demand for their programmes. Unlike before, this time SLIIT approached MTF as an independent entity rather than a part of UoM. In September 2000, MTF agreed to provide LKR 500 million for construction work and allocated the land in Malabe. Construction started the following year in 2001.

After a change in government in 2001, promised funding from the MTF for the construction of the Malabe Campus stopped abruptly, leaving the MD/CEO to finance the completion of the first phase with his own personal resources. Negotiations with the MTF eventually led to an agreement in 2005 for SLIIT to lease the land and operate independently as a separate legal entity. In exchange, SLIIT would provide board seats for MTF nominees and pay 20% of financial surpluses generated only from the Malabe Campus to the MTF. This agreement remained in effect until another change of government in 2015.

In 2015, the Mahapola Trust Fund requested to review and amend their agreement with the Sri Lanka Institute of Information Technology (SLIIT), asking for the return of all funds originally contributed, including interest. SLIIT had invested over LKR 2 billion into the Malabe Campus between 2005 and 2015. A new agreement was signed in which SLIIT paid LKR 408.5 million to the MTF, which included the initial funding plus interest. The MTF renewed the lease of the land to SLIIT for 60 years, with a lease rental of LKR 20 million per annum, and increasing every five years up to LKR 45 million. The MTF withdrew its members from the board of SLIIT after receiving full payment. The ownership of the land remained with the MTF, and they earn lease rental income from it.

=== Further expansion of the University ===
In 2007, SLIIT started expanding into new fields of study. These include electronic engineering and business management in collaboration with Sheffield Hallam University. SLIIT also expanded its presence from Colombo and its suburbs to other parts of the country, by establishing centres in Kandy and Matara, making SLIIT accessible in six locations.

In 2011, SLIIT established its Faculty of Business after it was accredited by the UGC to award Bachelor of Business Administration degrees in Human Capital Management, Accounting and Finance, Marketing Management, Quality management and Management Information Systems.

This was followed in 2012, with the establishment of the Colombo Academy of Hospitality Management (CAHM). The project is a joint venture of SLIIT, Colombo Academy of Hospitality Management (CAHM), and William Angliss Institute of Australia. It has been developed in line with international standards, housing a training kitchen, banqueting facility, training restaurant, model bedrooms, an IT training centre, and team rooms for students' practical training to prepare students for the degree of Bachelor of Tourism and Hospitality Management.

The Faculty of Engineering was formed in 2013, with it awarding its own Bachelor of Science in Engineering degrees and master's degrees from partner universities such as Curtin University and Sheffield Hallam University. The SLIIT Computing was established as a privately managed subsidiary of SLIIT in Kollupitiya to further expand undergraduate studies.

In 2015, SLIIT established its School of Architecture, offering a three-year degree in architecture. In 2016, introducing 16 new research-based degrees including PhD and MPhil degrees approved by the Ministry of Higher Education, Technology and Innovation of Sri Lanka.

In 2017, the Faculty of Humanities and Sciences was established as the newest division that provides the most extensive assortment of programs offered by any faculty on the campus. This faculty offers programs in diverse areas, including Biotechnology, Education, Law, Mathematics, Nursing, and Psychology.

== Campuses ==
The Malabe Campus

SLIIT has three main campuses. Two in the Western Province, a Metropolitan campus in central Colombo, and a flagship suburban campus at Malabe. The new Kandy campus is currently under construction. The institute also has regional centres in Kandy, Matara, Jaffna, and Kurunegala.

=== Malabe ===
The Malabe campus spans 25 acres of land close to Malabe city, and provides a broad range of undergraduate and postgraduate programs. Its contemporary buildings are includes a fourteen-story structure for Administration and Examinations, a ten-story building for the Computing Faculty and the main library, a seven-story building for the Engineering Faculty, and a two-story building with a spacious auditorium. The building complex covers more than 200,000 square feet, and comprises lecture halls, laboratories, auditoriums, communication facilities, a library, administrative and service facilities, and common areas for students, including several canteens.

=== Colombo City ===
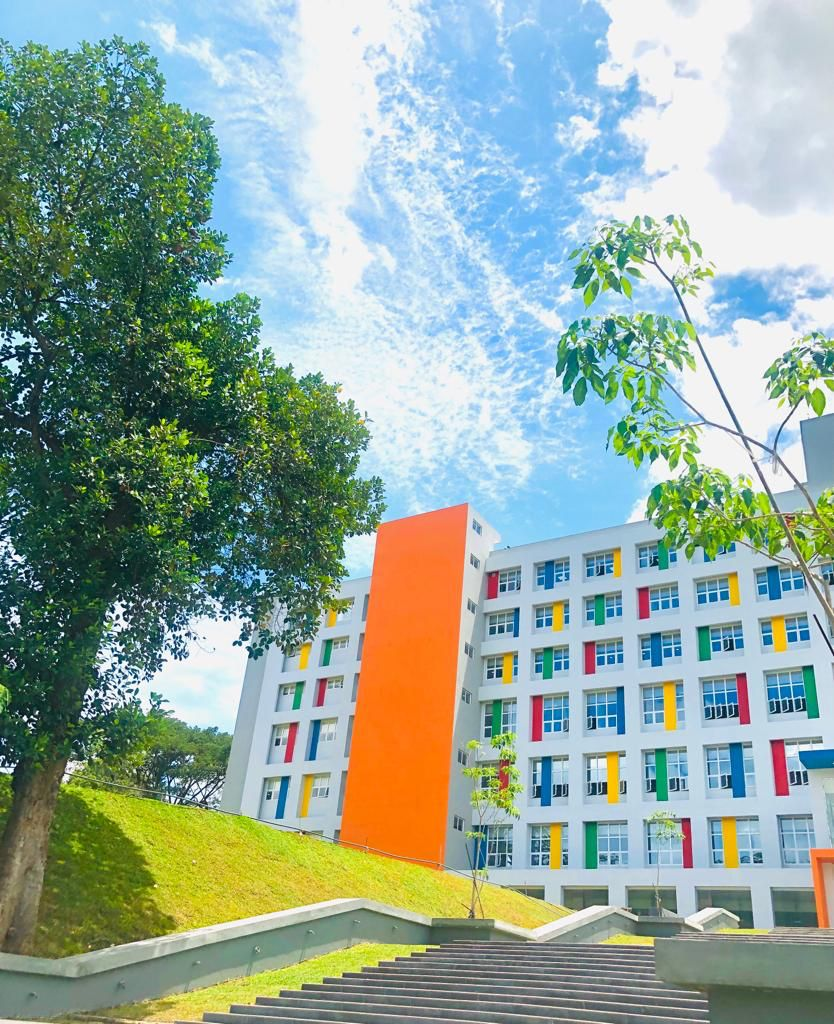
SLIIT Kandy UNI

The Metropolitan campus is located within the Bank of Ceylon Merchant Tower at Kollupitiya. Metropolitan campus only offer undergraduate degrees from the Faculty of Business and Faculty of Computing. After completing their first 2 years of study, students are transferred to the Malabe campus for further specialized education. Additionally, the campus has in-house facilities for conducting Professional Development and Research and Development programs.

=== Kandy ===
The Kandy Campus is situated next to the Pallekele International Cricket Stadium and is scheduled to begin operating in March 2023. The Campus comprises a seven-storey academic building and a ten-storey hostel building, which can accommodate up to 8,000 students upon full completion and 2,000 students during the first phase. The Campus has classrooms, laboratories, a hostel that can house up to 600 students, libraries, research and development facilities, a conference hall, a medical and wellbeing center, indoor and outdoor sports facilities, as well as communal spaces. All degree programmes currently available at the SLIIT Malabe Campus are expected to be offered at the Kandy Campus.

== Governance ==
The university is governed by a board of directors headed by a chairman; the current chairman is Professor L. Rathnayake, who succeeded founding chairman Professor Sam Karunaratne. The Board delegates power over academic and administrative affairs of the institute to the President, who also acts as CEO of the institute. Professor Lalith Gamage is the current President.

=== Current Board ===
- Prof. Lakshman L. Ratnayake
- Prof. Lalith Gamage
- Prof. Nimal Rajapakse
- Mr. Thilan M. Wijesinghe
- Mr. Reshan Dewapura
- Mr. Jehan Amaratunga
- Dr. Harsha Cabral

== Faculties and Schools ==
=== Faculty of Computing ===
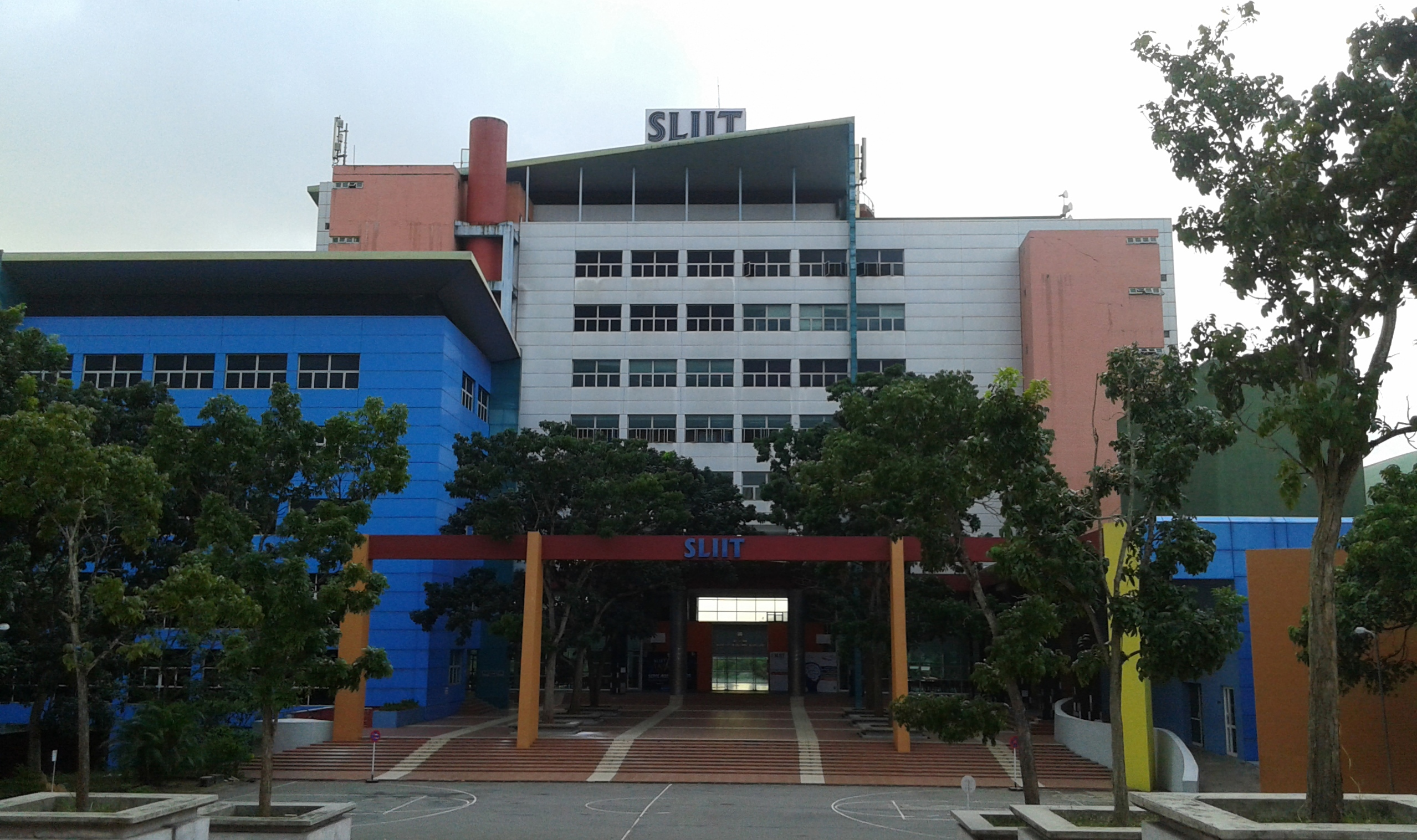
Faculty of Computing

The origins of the Faculty of Computing go back to the formation of SLIIT in 1999, when it introduced degrees in Information technology. SLIIT offers a 4-year Honours degree in Information technology. Students can choose to specialise in 8 different fields. They are Information Technology, Computer Systems and Network Engineering, Software Engineering, Artificial Intelligence, Information Systems Engineering, Cyber Security, Interactive Media and Data Science. Students choose to specialise from the 2nd year onwards and some specialisations are restricted by a particular CGPA threshold.

The faculty offers an array of academic programs that encompass diverse domains within the information technology sector. These programs are structured to enable students to select a specialization. SLIIT Faculty of Computing is bolstered by an around 150 academics, who are complemented by computer laboratories.

The degrees conferred by the Faculty of Computing are accredited by SLIIT and have received approval from the University Grants Commission pursuant to the Universities Act of Sri Lanka. Additionally, SLIIT is a member of the Association of Commonwealth Universities as well as the International Association of Universities.

In 2022, Bsc (Hons) in Computer Science degree and a Bsc (Hons) in Computer Systems Engineering degree was introduced.

=== SLIIT Business School ===
SLIIT Business School, which was formally known as the Faculty of Business was established in 2011, offering BBA degree programs. The BBA Honours Degree, offered by SLIIT, is structured to facilitate students in assimilating theoretical constructs and effectively applying them to pragmatic contexts.

SLIIT business degrees are accredited by the University Grants Commission as per the stipulations of the Universities Act. Additionally, SLIIT holds memberships in the Association of Commonwealth Universities and International Association of Universities. The institute is also affiliated with the Association to Advance Collegiate Schools of Business. In recognition of potential constraints that may arise for students, the program permits enrollees to temporarily discontinue their studies. However, re-entry into the program is contingent upon adherence to registration protocols and securing approval from SLIIT.

Students enrolled in the BBA Honours Degree program have the option to complete the entire four-year course under the auspices of SLIIT, as sanctioned by the University Grants Commission and the Ministry of Higher Education in Sri Lanka. Alternatively, students have the option to pursue offshore programs from Liverpool John Moores University and Manchester Metropolitan University in Sri Lanka through SLIIT.

SLIIT business school has also established a collaborative alliance with the University of Queensland, which is among the top 50 universities globally. This collaboration offers students to undertake the initial academic year in Sri Lanka and subsequently transfer to the University of Queensland for the remaining duration of the program. Additionally, students have the flexibility to complete their degree at one of SLIIT's affiliated institutions in the United Kingdom, the United States, Canada, or Australia.

=== Faculty of Engineering ===
Established in 2013, the Faculty of Engineering offers BSc programs in Engineering degree programs. All engineering degrees conferred by SLIIT have been sanctioned by the Ministry of Higher Education of Sri Lanka under the purview of the Universities Act. Additionally, SLIIT Quantity Surveying program is offered through a partnership with the Liverpool John Moores University in the United Kingdom.

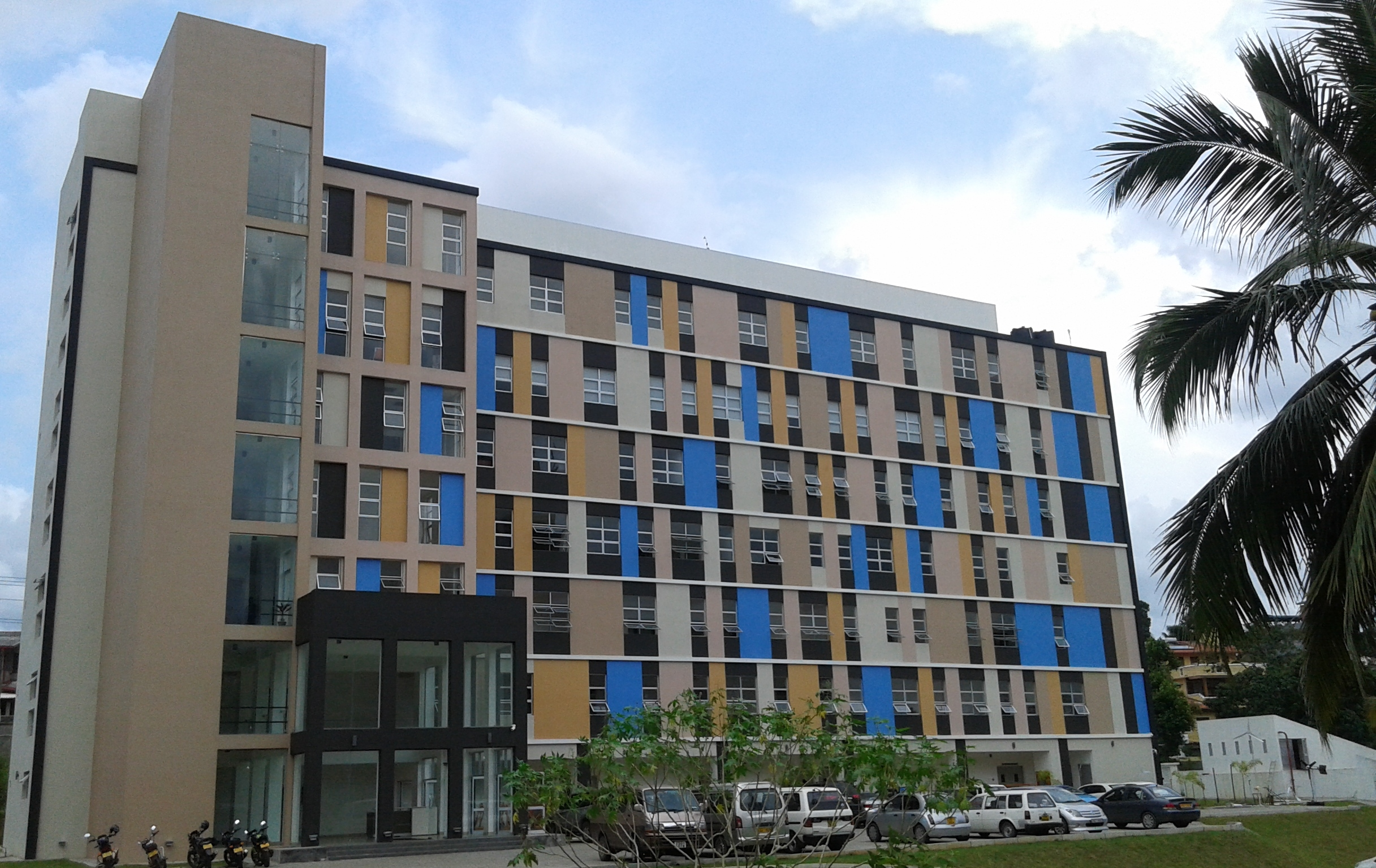
Faculty of Engineering

The engineering curricula at the undergraduate level are developed in compliance with the Washington Accord Accreditation criteria via the Institution of Engineers, Sri Lanka, and are in the process of acquiring recognition by IESL. The Quantity Surveying program is also in the pursuit of accreditation from the Institute of Quantity Surveyors, Sri Lanka, and the Royal Institution of Chartered Surveyors for domestic instruction at SLIIT.

The Faculty of Engineering at SLIIT has also collaborated with the University of Queensland. This partnership avails students of the opportunity to undertake the initial two years of their studies in Sri Lanka and culminate their degree at the University of Queensland.

The Faculty of Engineering has introduced Master of Philosophy and Doctor of Philosophy programs in engineering, which have received approval from the Ministry of Higher Education, Sri Lanka. These programs offer students the possibility to compete for full or partial scholarships, which include stipends.

=== Faculty of Humanities and Sciences ===
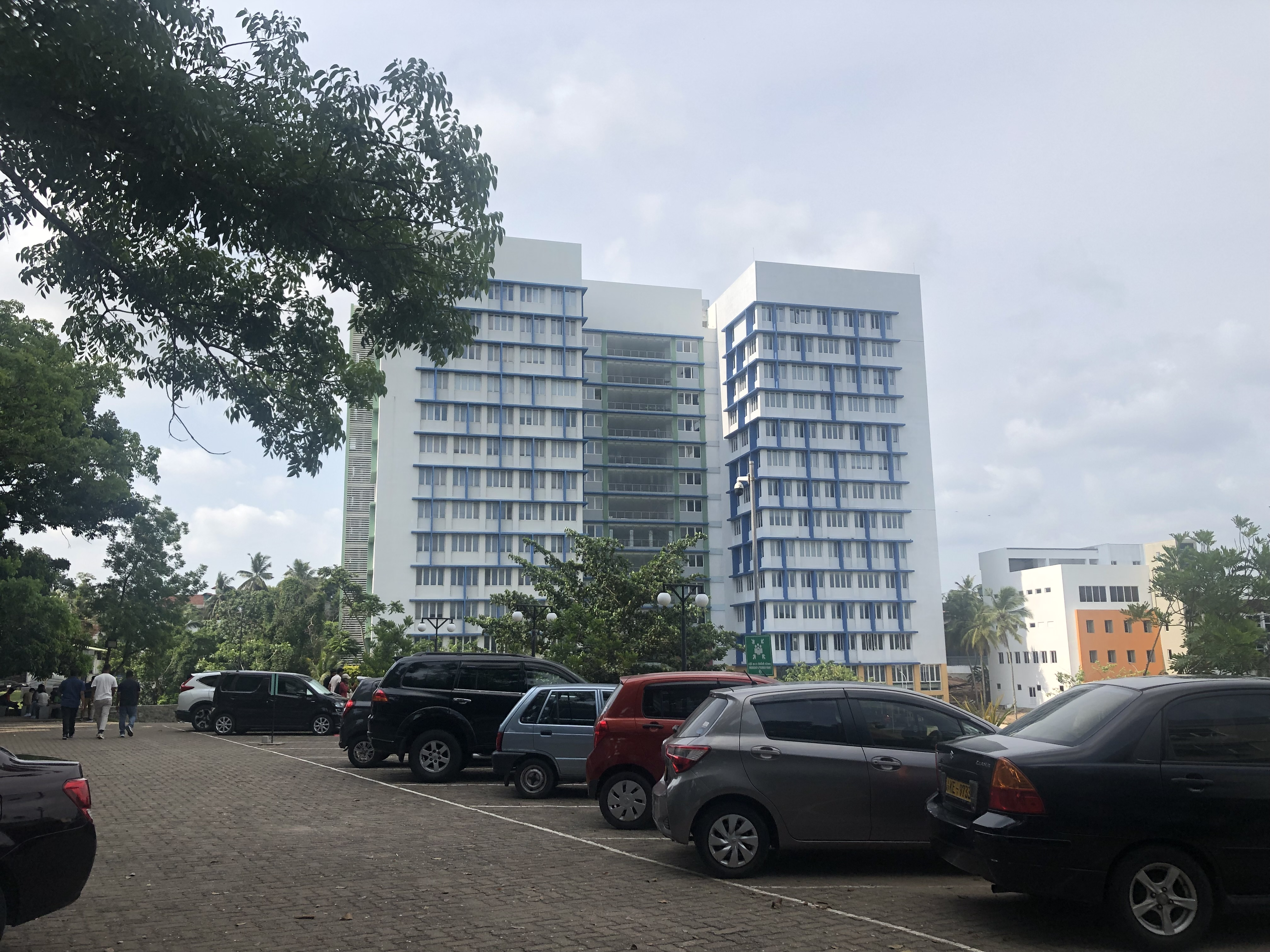
Faculty of Humanities & Sciences

The Faculty of Science and Education was established in 2017, with the introduction of a degree programs in Biotechnology, natural sciences, law, education, psychology and nursing. The Faculty of Humanities & Sciences is an academic division. To facilitate the academic programs, significant investments have been made in developing the needed infrastructure. This includes laboratories, classrooms, moot courts for legal training, and access to electronic repositories as well as a collection of reference books.

The Faculty currently stands at over 45 members.

=== Faculty of Graduate Studies ===
The Faculty of Graduate Studies is a graduate school that conducts taught and research postgraduate degree programs in the fields of engineering and computing.

=== William Angliss Institute @ SLIIT ===
The William Angliss Institute was started as Colombo Academy of Hospitality Management 2012 as a joint venture with SLIIT and William Angliss Institute of TAFE, offering degrees in tourism and hospitality management.

=== School of Architecture ===
The School of Architecture was established in 2015 offering BSc and MSc degree programs in architecture. Currently, the SLIIT School of Architecture offers two primary degree programs: the Bachelor of Science with Honors in Architecture, and the Master of Science (MSc) in Architecture. These programs are delivered in partnership with Liverpool John Moores University, located in the United Kingdom.

== SLIIT City Uni ==
SLIIT City Uni (SCU), formerly known as SLIIT Academy and later SCU, was established as an subsidiary institute of the Sri Lanka Institute of Information Technology (SLIIT). The institution was created to expand access to higher education through industry‑focused academic programmes. SCU was registered under the Companies Act No. 17 of 1982 and incorporated with the Registrar of Companies under the number N (PVS) 29707 on 31 December 2001.

Originally operating as SLIIT Academy, the institute offered foundation programmes and undergraduate degrees in Information Technology, Business, Engineering, and Health and Life Sciences, along with a postgraduate MSc in Project Management. As the institution expanded its academic portfolio and operational scope, it adopted the name SLIIT City Uni (SCU) to reflect its broader identity while continuing to function as a subsidiary of SLIIT.

== Academics ==
SLIIT offers undergraduate and postgraduate degrees through its faculties and schools, including local programmes approved by the UGC and international degrees delivered in partnership with foreign universities.

SLIIT Faculties and Degree Programmes
Faculty / School	Type	Key Degree Programmes
Faculty of Computing	Local	BSc (Hons) in Information Technology (Specializations in Artificial Intelligence, Software Engineering, Data Science, Cyber Security, Computer Systems & Network Engineering, Information Systems Engineering, Interactive Media); BSc (Hons) in Computer Science; BSc (Hons) in Computer Systems Engineering
Faculty of Computing	International	Bachelor of Artificial Intelligence (Deakin University); Bachelor of Computing / IT (Curtin University); Bachelor of Computer Science / IT (University of Queensland)
Faculty of Engineering	Local	BSc Engineering (Hons) in Civil Engineering, Electrical & Electronic, Mechanical Engineering, Mechatronics, Materials Engineering; BSc (Hons) in Quantity Surveying
Faculty of Engineering	International	BEng (Hons) in Civil, Mechanical, Electrical, Mechatronic (Curtin University, University of Queensland); BSc (Hons) Quantity Surveying (LJMU)
SLIIT Business School	Local	BBA (Hons) (Specializations in Accounting & Finance, Business Analytics, HCM, Marketing, Quality Management, Logistics, MIS, Business Management)
SLIIT Business School	International	BBA (Hons) (LJMU); Bachelor of Business Management / Commerce / Economics (University of Queensland); BSc (Hons) Fashion Business & Management (Manchester Metropolitan University)
Faculty of Humanities & Sciences	Local	Bachelor of Laws (LLB Hons); BEd (Hons) in Physical Science, English, Biological Sciences, IT, Social Sciences; BSc (Hons) in Biotechnology, Psychology, Biomedical Science, Financial Mathematics and Applied Statistics
Faculty of Humanities & Sciences	International	LLB (Hons) Law (LJMU); BSc (Hons) Psychology (LJMU); Higher Diploma in Nursing (Deakin University)
School of Architecture	International	BSc (Hons) Architecture (LJMU); BA (Hons) Interior Design (LJMU); Diploma in Heritage & Cultural Tourism
Faculty of Graduate Studies	Postgraduate	Master of Business Administration (MBA); MSc in Artificial Intelligence, Information Technology, Cyber Security, Network Engineering, Enterprise Applications; MSc in Architecture (LJMU); Master of Philosophy (MPhil) & Doctor of Philosophy (PhD)

=== Research ===
SLIIT holds various research symposiums annually. SLIIT Business School, has recently initiated the International Conference on Sustainable & Digital Business (ICSDB) in 2022. ICSDB is expected to make significant strides and innovations in the realm of international academic conferences. SLIIT International Conference for Advancements in Humanities & Sciences, (SICASH) is held annually by the Faculty of Humanities & Sciences.

SLIIT conducts IT and computer-related research and is a partner of ConceptNursery, Sri Lanka's technology incubator.

In 2025 SLIIT became one of the few Sri Lankan universities to gain a United States patent. The patent was for a low cost production method for Silver Iron Titanate Nanoparticles from Ilmenite. Before SLIIT only the Universities of Colombo, Sri Jayewardenepura, and Moratuwa had obtained US parents.

=== Professional courses ===
SLIIT conducts the Cisco Network Academy courses (CCNA, CCNP, and CCSP) under the regional Cisco Network Academy in Sri Lanka. SLIIT is also one of the Microsoft Academies in Sri Lanka offering Certification Courses.

== Student Councils ==
=== Students Interactive Society (SIS) ===
The Students Interactive Society of SLIIT is a central organization that works closely with various student communities to foster collaboration and ensure a vibrant campus life. As a key part of the student experience, SIS organizes a wide range of events and activities that cater to both academic and extracurricular interests. The society upholds the values and standards of SLIIT by ensuring that all activities adhere to institutional rules and maintain the decorum of the university. SIS plays a crucial role in creating a sense of community among students, promoting interaction, teamwork, and leadership.

=== Faculty of Computing Students' Community (FCSC) ===
The Faculty of Computing Students' Community of SLIIT is a leading student organization within the Faculty of Computing, consisting of undergraduate students. Established to enhance students' academic and professional skills, FCSC aims to prepare its members for the competitive job market in Sri Lanka’s IT and computing sectors. The community focuses on nurturing both hard and soft skills through a range of co-curricular activities, industry engagement events, and skill-building workshops.

=== Faculty of Humanities & Sciences Student Community (FHSSC) ===
The Faculty of Humanities & Sciences Student Community is the official student body representing the multidisciplinary Faculty of Humanities and Sciences at SLIIT. This community is made up of students from various academic disciplines, including Natural Science & Education, Law, Psychology, Nursing, and Mathematics.

=== SLIIT Business School Student Community (SBSSC) ===
The Business School Student Community is the student body formed under the Students Interactive Society (SIS), representing undergraduates from the Business Management stream at SLIIT. SBSSC serves as the student representative group for the SLIIT Business School.

=== Faculty of Engineering Student Community (FESC) ===
The Faculty of Engineering Student Community is the primary student body representing the Faculty of Engineering at SLIIT. Operating under the guidance of the Students Interactive Society (SIS), FESC focuses on addressing the academic challenges and concerns faced by engineering students.

== Rankings ==
Publications	Category	2016	2017	2018	2019	2020	2021	2022	2023	2024	2025	2026
QS	Asian Universities	-	-	-	-	-	-	701-750	-	-	-	
Webometrics Ranking of World Universities	Sri Lankan Universities	14	14	12	9	12	16	8	13	11	11	10

== Sport ==
The Malabe campus has a range of sporting facilities including cricket, rugby, basketball, netball, volleyball, tennis, table tennis, badminton, chess, carrom, karate and MMA. SLIIT sporting teams compete in a range of local and national competitions.

== See also ==
- Information technology in Sri Lanka
