= Mahapola Higher Education Scholarship Trust Fund =

Financial aid fund in Sri Lanka

Mahapola Trust Fund මහපොළ භාරකාර අරමුදල
- Type: Trust fund
- Founded: 29 October 1981; 44 years ago
- Founder: Lalith Athulathmudali
- Headquarters: 8th Floor, CWE Secretariat Building, 27 Vauxhall Street, Colombo 02, Sri Lanka, Colombo, Sri Lanka
- Owner: Government of Sri Lanka
- Website: www.mahapola.lk

The Mahapola Higher Education Scholarship Trust Fund was established under Act No. 66 of 1981. The fund's mission was to provide financial assistance to unprivileged youth, and to create equal opportunities in higher education through the continuous improvement of learning facilities.

The concept of "Mahapola" was founded in 1980 by the late Hon. Lalith Athulathmudali, then serving as the Minister of Trade and Naval Affairs. Since the first scholarships were awarded in 1981 — beginning with just 422 recipients — the programme has grown to benefit over 450,000 Sri Lankan students.

The fund has also founded the Development Lotteries Board and the Sri Lanka Institute of Information Technology.
