= Bambalapitiya =

Bambalapitiya බම්බලපිටිය பம்பலப்பிட்டி
- Suburb
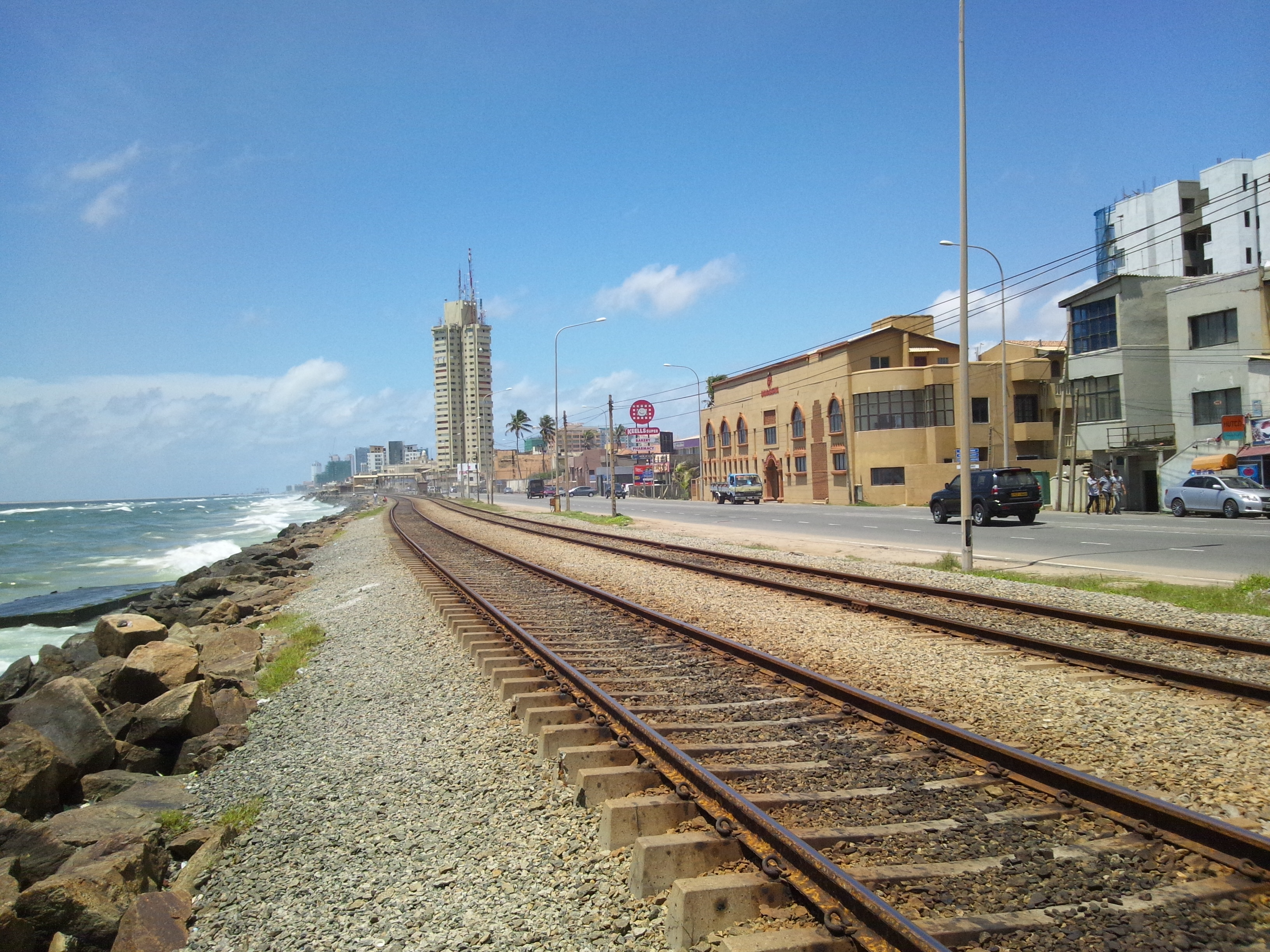
- Railway tracks running along Marine Drive, Bambalapitiya

- Location within Colombo District
- Coordinates: 6°53′20″N 79°51′24″E
- Country: Sri Lanka
- Province: Western Province
- District: Colombo District
- Time zone: UTC+5:30 (Sri Lanka Standard Time Zone)
- Postal Code: 00400

Bambalapitiya is a southern coastal neighbourhood of Colombo, Sri Lanka.

The area also known as Colombo 4, spans about 1.5 km^{2} (370 acres) along Galle Road. The western boundary of the suburb is the Indian Ocean and it is bordered to the east by Havelock Town, the north by Kollupitiya, and to the south by Wellawatte. It falls within the Kollupitiya (Colpetty) Ward of the Colombo Municipal Council.

== Educational institutions ==
Bambalapitiya is regarded as an educational hub. Many private sector schools and colleges such as IIT (Informatics Institute of Technology), ICBS, ICBT Campus, IDM Computer Studies, ESOFT Computer Studies, and PIBT are in this area. It contains a number of notable schools, including Colombo Hindu College, Holy Family Convent, Muslim Ladies College, Ramanathan Hindu Ladies' College, St. Peter's College, St. Paul's Girls School, Milagiriya.

== Diplomatic missions ==
- Consulate General of Greece
- Consulate of Singapore
- Consulate of Ireland

== Transport ==
The A2 Highway (Galle Road) and Marine Drive, runs through the suburb, parallel to the coast.

The Bambalapitiya railway station services the area. It is the fourth station on the Coastal line.

== Commercial ==
- Majestic City and Pearl Grand Town, the seven-storey commercial and shopping complex.
