= Informatics Institute of Technology =

Higher education institute in Sri Lanka

IIT
- Informatics Institute of Technology
- Motto: Inspire. Innovate. Transcend.
- Type: Private College/Institute
- Established: 1990 (As the Informatics Institute of Computer Studies)
- Dean: Ms.Naomi Krishnarajah (IT) Prof.PSM Gunaratne (Bus)
- Director: (CEO) Mr Mohan Fernando
- Students: 4000
- Location: Colombo, Sri Lanka
- Website: www.iit.ac.lk

The Informatics Institute of Technology (IIT) is a private higher education institute in Sri Lanka which offers specialized offshore British degree programmes in IT and Business. IIT has collaborated with British universities to offer undergraduate and postgraduate programmes in Sri Lanka since its inception in 1990.

IIT has produced over 3000 graduates who are spread around the world. The institute is currently located in Colombo 6 and consists of nearly 4000 students.

IIT alumni have received internal degrees through Manchester Metropolitan University, Keele University, Canterbury Christchurch University, Robert Gordon University, and University of Westminster.

== History ==
The Informatics Institute of Technology (IIT) was established in 1990 under the name Informatics Institute of Computer Studies (IICS) with the objective of catering to the growing demand for ICT education.

With the objective of catering to the demand of the growing ICT sector and to provide British higher education to the Sri Lankan youth, Chairman of the Informatics Group, Dr. Gamini Wickramasinghe took an initiative to establish IIT.

IICS, which was collaborated with the Manchester Metropolitan University (MMU), was a platform which enabled Sri Lankan students to receive an internationally recognized British degree by studying in Sri Lanka at fraction of the cost of completing the degree programme in UK.

The first student body consisted of 22 students, and the original faculty of 6 was expanded to 12 for the second year. In 1994, IICS held its first convocation with former Sri Lankan President J.R. Jayawardena gracing the occasion as its guest of honour.

With a more modern ideology and with plans of expanding, in 2002 IICS was renamed as the Informatics Institute of Technology and was registered with the Board of Investment of Sri Lanka.

In 2000, IIT collaborated with the Keele University and became the pioneer in bringing the first British MSc in IT to Sri Lanka. In 2005, IIT completed the University of Westminster validation process which has endorsed undergraduate and postgraduate programmes.

In 2016, IIT partnered with Robert Gordon University to introduces Sri Lanka's first-ever MSc in Business Analytics and Fashion Business Management Masters program.

== Degrees ==
Undergraduate programmes are offered in the disciplines of IT and Business.

- BSc (Hons) in Computer Science
- BEng (Hons) in Software Engineering
- BSc(Hons) in Artificial Intelligence and Data Science
- BSc(Hons) Business Information Systems
- BA (Hons) Business Management

Postgraduate Masters Programmes

- MSc Advanced Software Engineering
- MSc Business Analytics
- MA Fashion Business Management
- MSc Big Data
- MSc Cyber Security and Forensics

Foundation programme.

- Foundation Programme

== Facilities ==
The institute is a five floor facility which contains lecture rooms, IT Labs and tutorial rooms. The library has a collection of over 7,000 volumes of related texts and references. The library also subscribes to academic and professional journals. All students have access to the special study rooms, conference halls, canteen and recreational facilities, including a swimming pool.

== Awards ==
IIT has won local and International Awards:

- NBQSA – Silver award under the Tertiary Student category (Technology)
- Imagine Cup 2013 Worldwide Finals held on 11 July at Russia
- GLO-BUS
- e-Swabhimani award
- First Runner up at Imagine Cup 2012
- Team ‘CR-Coderzs’ from IIT win second place at Microsoft Imagine Cup 2011
- 'Gold’ for the third time in succession at NBQSA 2011
- Third place at the Motorola Inter-University Enterprise Mobility Application Software Development Competition – 2010
- Gold award in the tertiary category in NBQSA 2010
- Gold and Bronze Awards at NBQSA 2009
- Silver medal for the Tertiary Education category at NBQSA 2005

== Clubs and Societies ==
- IIT Student Union
- IIT Rotaract Club
- Mozilla Campus Club - IIT
- AIESEC
- IEEE
- IEEE WIE of IIT
- IEEECS of IIT
- Toastmasters
- Mobile Club
- Gaming Club
- iFM

== Notable alumni ==
- Bathiya Jayakody (Musician)
