= CCNP =

Professional Cisco networking qualification

A Cisco Certified Network Professional (CCNP) is a person in the IT industry who has achieved the professional level of Cisco Career Certification.

== Professional certifications ==
Prior to February 2020 there were approximately eight professional-level certification programs within Cisco Career Certifications.

- CCDP
- CCNP Cloud
- CCNP Collaboration
- CCNP Data Center
- CCNP Routing and Switching
- CCNP Security
- CCNP Service Provider
- CCNP Wireless

Cisco has announced that as of February 2020, the above format has been retired and replaced with the following:

- CCNP Enterprise (integrating CCNP Routing and Switching, CCDP and CCNP Wireless)
- CCNP Data Center (integrating CCNP Cloud)
- CCNP Security
- CCNP Service Provider
- CCNP Collaboration
- Cisco Certified DevNet Professional

Migration guides to the newer certification exams are available from Cisco at its CCNP Migration Tools page.

== Required exams ==
Before February 2020 relevant entry-level certifications needed to be passed in advance if a candidate wanted to attempt the professional level exams. Starting February 2020, no entry-level certification will be required to attempt the CCNP exams.

== Validity ==
The validity of CCNP Certification is 3 years. Renewal requires certification holders to register for and pass same or higher level Cisco recertification exam(s) every 3 years or obtain 80 continuing education credits.

== Related certifications ==
- Associate-level certification: CCNA
- Expert-level Certification: CCIE
