= ESOFT Metro Campus =

- Type: Private Limited Liability Company
- Industry: Education and training
- Founded: 26 June 2000
- Founder: Dayan Rajapakse
- Headquarters: No 3, De Fonseka Place, Colombo 4, Sri Lanka; 6°53′18.5″N 79°51′29″E
- Area served: Sri Lanka
- Key people: Dayan Rajapakse (MD)
- Website: www.esoft.lk

ESOFT Metro Campus (previously known as ESOFT Computer Studies) is a private sector educational institute or college located in Colombo, Sri Lanka. It offers academic and professional qualifications in Computing, Business & Management, Engineering, Hospitality and English. Established in the year 2000, the company today has 40 branches nationwide. It is headed by Dr. Dayan Rajapakse.

== Early years ==
ESOFT was established in Kirilapone (which is a suburban area of Colombo, Sri Lanka), and initially offered training services for students that were preparing for the BCS (UK) Professional Examinations. They subsequently moved to their present location in Bambalapitiya (Colombo) which is a hub for IT training in Sri Lanka.

== Programmes ==
Programmes taught at ESOFT Metro Campus are organised into five schools or divisions. These are: School of Computing, School of Business, School of Engineering and Technology, School of Hospitality Management and the Language Academy.

=== School of Computing ===
Degree programmes available at the ESOFT School of Computing include the Bachelors in Information Technology (BIT) awarded by the University of Colombo School of Computing (UCSC) and the BSc (Hons) in Computing and BEng (Hons) in Software Engineering awarded by the London Metropolitan University.

Students can also opt to follow professional qualifications such as the Certificate, Diploma and Post Graduate Diploma (PGD) awarded by the British Computer Society (BCS – Chartered Institute of IT) and the BTEC Higher National Diploma (HND) in Computing and Systems Development awarded by Edexcel.

In addition, ESOFT also conducts several vendor certification programmes including those for Microsoft, Cisco and Oracle.

=== School of Business ===
The ESOFT School of Business conducts classes for both Bachelors and Masters level Business Administration qualifications awarded by the London Metropolitan University.

Students can also opt to follow professional qualifications such as the BTEC Higher National Diploma (HND) in Business Management awarded by Edexcel.

=== School of Engineering and Technology ===
The ESOFT School of Engineering and Technology conducts classes for both Bachelors and Masters level qualifications in Mechanical Engineering, Electrical and Electronic Engineering, Civil Engineering and Construction Management. These are awarded by the Kingston University London.

=== School of Hospitality Management ===
The ESOFT School of Hospitality Management offers professional qualifications such as the BTEC HNDs in Travel and Tourism Management and Hospitality Management awarded by Edexcel.

=== Language Academy ===
The language academy offers Pearson Assured courses in both academic and professional English.

== Recognition ==
Although ESOFT started teaching for the BCS Exams in 2000, ESOFT was designated as an Accredited Course Provider of the BCS in the year 2007, in recognition of the standards that are maintained in the course delivery. ESOFT is the only organisation in the world to be accredited for all three levels of the BCS Higher Education Qualifications (as at November 2010). ESOFT has also produced several prize winners (high achievers) over the past few years for the BCS and BIT programmes.

The University of Moratuwa has signed a Memorandum of Understanding with ESOFT appointing it as a Collaborative Partner for offering the Bachelor of Information Technology (BIT) External Degree. Such an appointment is made after an extensive evaluation process and ESOFT is one of only three such partners to be appointed. ESOFT currently conducts the BIT programme in Colombo, Kandy, Kurunegala, and Jaffna. As of 2011, the University of Moratuwa has stopped conducting the programme online and is working purely via the partner mode.

Edexcel (UK) has Accredited ESOFT to conduct the Higher National Diploma (HND) Programmes in Computing since 2009 and Business Management since 2010.

In September 2019, ESOFT Metro Campus Colombo was recognised by the Ministry of Higher Education and the University Grants Commission (UGC) as a Non State Degree Awarding Institution. This means that ESOFT can officially award their own degrees. The first degree to be introduced was the Bachelor of Information Technology Honours degree. The Bachelor of Business Management Honours degree was approved in 2021 with the first intake scheduled for 2022 February.

== Partnerships, Affiliations, and Memberships ==
- In 2007, ESOFT was appointed as an Accredited Course Provider of the BCS for the HEQ Professional Examinations (UK). This is especially noteworthy since ESOFT is the only organisation to be accredited for all three levels of the Higher Education Qualifications (HEQ), in the World.
- In 2009, ESOFT was appointed as an Approved Centre of Edexcel, for conducting their Level 5 programmes in Sri Lanka.
- In 2010, ESOFT entered into an agreement with the University of Moratuwa, to be appointed as a Collaborative Partner of the University for offering the Bachelor of IT External Degree.
- In 2012, ESOFT partnered with Kingston University UK to offer undergraduate and postgraduate qualifications in various disciplines of Engineering. Later, this partnership was expanded to cover undergraduate and postgraduate qualifications in IT.
- In 2013, ESOFT entered into a strategic and exclusive partnership with London Metropolitan University, UK to offer their undergraduate and postgraduate qualifications in Sri Lanka.
- In 2021, ESOFT and Virtusa signed a MoU under their Campus Reach initiative, to provide internship and training opportunities for undergraduate students of ESOFT.
- In 2021, ESOFT Metro Campus was admitted as a member of the Association of Commonwealth Universities (ACU) UK, thereby adding to the international recognition of ESOFT's awards and degrees.
- In 2023, ESOFT partnered with SEG Awards (UK), and UK Awards to offer Level 3, 4, and 5 qualifications to Sri Lankan students in a range of specialist areas including IT and Management.
- In 2024, ESOFT was admitted as an institution member of the Asia-Pacific Quality Network (APQN).

== CSR Activities ==
ESOFT is involved in several Corporate Social Responsibility activities and one of the most recent is their platinum level sponsorship of the Edex 2011 Education and Careers Expo held in January 2011. ESOFT also has a Mobile Unit – a bus fitted with 20 workstations – which is sent to rural areas and to schools to provide positive experiences to students who may not have even seen or used a computer before.

As of 2012, ESOFT has been a co-sponsor of the Royal College Blue & Gold Hockey 7's Tournament which is organised with the participation of school teams from around the nation

In 2015, ESOFT started the E-Thilina project in partnership with Sirasa TV. The aim of the project was to donate complete computing labs to deserving and rural schools so as to provide children with the opportunity to learn IT/ICT at an early age. The project was continued into the year 2016 as well. Each lab consists of a minimum of 8 modern networked PC's along with a Laser Printer. Tables and Chairs and Carpeting are also provided, with the complete cost borne by ESOFT. Sirasa TV provides coverage via their media network. Two of the computer labs were opened by the President of Sri Lanka, Maithripala Sirisena. The E-Thilina project was concluded in 2018 after a successful run of 3 years where 33 computer labs were donated to public schools around the country.

ESOFT has also partnered with the Ranaviru Seva Authority of the State Ministry of Defence and Ministry of Defence to offer scholarships and savings on course fees for members of the Armed Forces and their families. The special loyalty card is known as Virusara Privilege, and was launched by the President Maithripala Sirisena.

In 2021, ESOFT launched an islandwide scholarship programme for IT and English, in partnership with the Ministry of Youth and Sports and the State Ministry of Digital Technology and Enterprise Development. A total of 10,000 full scholarships and 20,000 half scholarships were awarded as part of this programme.

== Awards and Recognitions ==
- 2012 – Awarded by Pearson (previously Edexcel) as the fastest developing centre in Sri Lanka.
- 2013 – Awarded as Gold Partner by Pearson, for the remarkable growth in student numbers and revenue.
- 2014 – Awarded Gold by BCS for being the Best Centre 2013/2014 in the large scale sector, at the BCS Academy Awards.
- 2014 – National Business Excellence Award in Education Services – Merit Award.
- 2015 – National Business Excellence Award in Education Services – Runners-up.
- 2015 – Awarded as Gold Partner by Pearson, for the remarkable growth in student numbers and revenue.
- 2016 – Awarded Gold by BCS for being the Best Centre 2015/2016 in the large scale sector, at the BCS Academy Awards held on 2016.10.16 at BMICH Colombo
- 2016 – Awarded as Gold Partner by Pearson, for the remarkable growth in student numbers and revenue.
- 2017 – Awarded as Platinum Partner by Pearson, for the high growth in student numbers and revenue, and being the market leader. Awarded in 2018, for the year 2017.
- 2018 – Awarded as Platinum Partner by Pearson for the second year running, for exceptional performance, and being the market leader. Awarded in 2019, for the year 2018.
- 2019 – Awarded as Platinum Partner by Pearson for the third year running.
- 2019 – Awarded degree awarding powers and recognition as a Non-State Higher Education Institution by the Ministry of Education of Sri Lanka.
- 2020 – Awarded as Platinum Partner by Pearson for the fourth consecutive year
- 2020 – Chairman Dr Dayan Rajapakse received National and Provincial Gold Awards as the Entrepreneur of the Year, organised by the Federation of Chambers of Commerce of Sri Lanka
- 2021 – Admitted as a member of the Association of Commonwealth Universities (ACU)
- 2021 – ESOFT wins the ‘Best Education Institute’ award for ESOFT Digital Campus Mobile App at the South Asian Business Excellence Awards 2021
- 2023 – ESOFT wins Gold under the Learning & Education category for the 2021 e-swabhimani awards conducted in 2023 by the ICTA. The award was for the ESOFT Digital Campus Mobile App
- 2023 – Awarded as Platinum Partner by Pearson for the fifth consecutive year, in recognition of the quality of delivery and the growth in numbers
- 2024 – Awarded as Inspiring University of the Year 2024 (Higher Education) by Ed Falcon Global Awards – India 2024, at the EdTalk World Conference in India 22 & 23 February 2024

== Branching Out ==
ESOFT started expanding into regional areas in 2005 and then launched the Accelerated Expansion Project (AEP) to increase the total number of branches to 27 by the end of the year 2010, with more branches being opened thereafter

Serial No	Branch Location	Date Established
1	Colombo	2000
2	Kurunegala	2005
3	Kandy	2006
4	Battaramulla	2006
5	Kotahena	2006 (closed in 2009)
6	Anuradhapura	2006
7	Matara	2008
8	Piliyandala	2008
9	Negombo	2008
10	Jaffna	2009
11	Nelliady	2009 (closed)
12	Batticaloa	2009
13	Bandarawela	2010
14	Nawalapitiya	2010 (closed in 2018)
15	Kilinochchi	2010 (closed)
16	Chavakachcheri	2010 (closed)
17	Matale	2010
18	Embilipitiya	2010
19	Ja-Ela	2010
20	Galle	2010
21	Kalmunai	2010
22	Kiribathgoda	2010
23	Kegalle	2010
24	Vavuniya	2010 (closed in 2016)
25	Mannar	2010 (closed in 2013)
26	Polonnaruwa	2010
27	Wattala	2010
28	Wennappuwa	2010
29	Minuwangoda	2011
30	Monaragala	2011
31	Kuliyapitiya	2011
32	Gampaha	2011
33	Hatton	2011
34	Nittambuwa	2011 (closed in 2013)
35	Homagama	2011
36	Hambanthota (closed in 2016)	2011
37	Ratnapura	2011
38	Nugegoda	2012
39	Katubedda	2013
40	Chilaw	2013
41	Kekirawa	2013
42	Badulla	2013
43	Kalutara	2013
44	Ambalangoda	2013
45	Panadura	2013
46	Narammala	2013
47	Uttara, Dhaka, Bangladesh	2016
48	Tangalle	2016
49	Nittambuwa	2018
