= Imagine Cup =

Annual competition

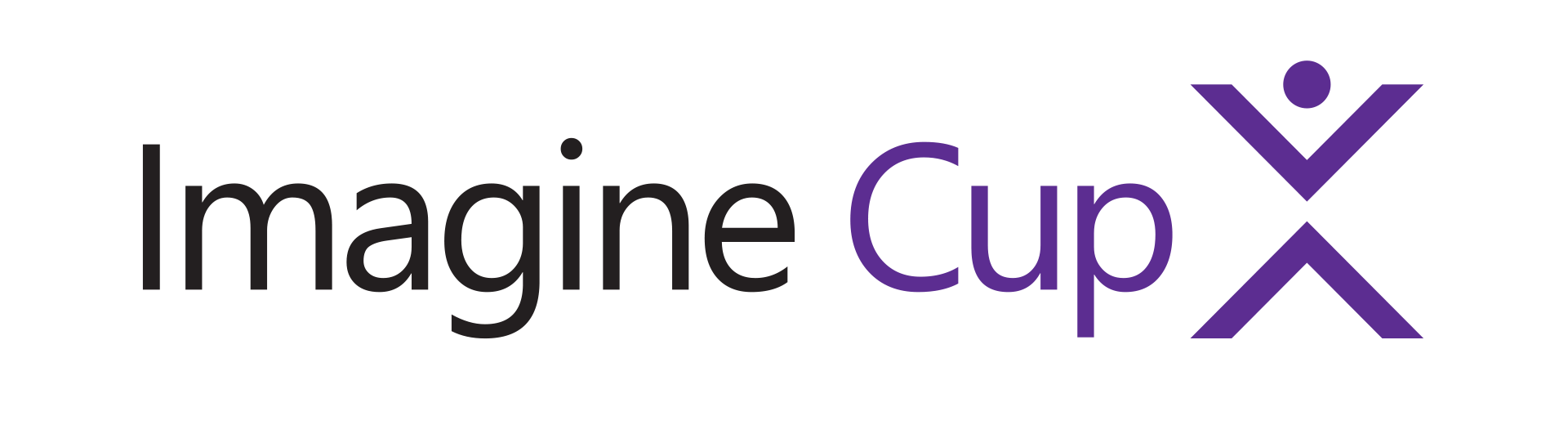
Imagine Cup official logo

Imagine Cup is an annual competition sponsored and hosted by Microsoft Corp. which brings together student developers worldwide to help resolve some of the world's toughest challenges. It is considered as "Olympics of Technology" by computer science and engineering and is considered one of the top competitions and awards related to technology and software design. All Imagine Cup competitors create projects that address the Imagine Cup theme: "Imagine a world where technology helps solve the toughest problems". Started in 2003, it has steadily grown, with more than 2 million competitors representing 150 countries in 2022. The 2023 Imagine Cup World Championship was held in Seattle, United States.

== History ==
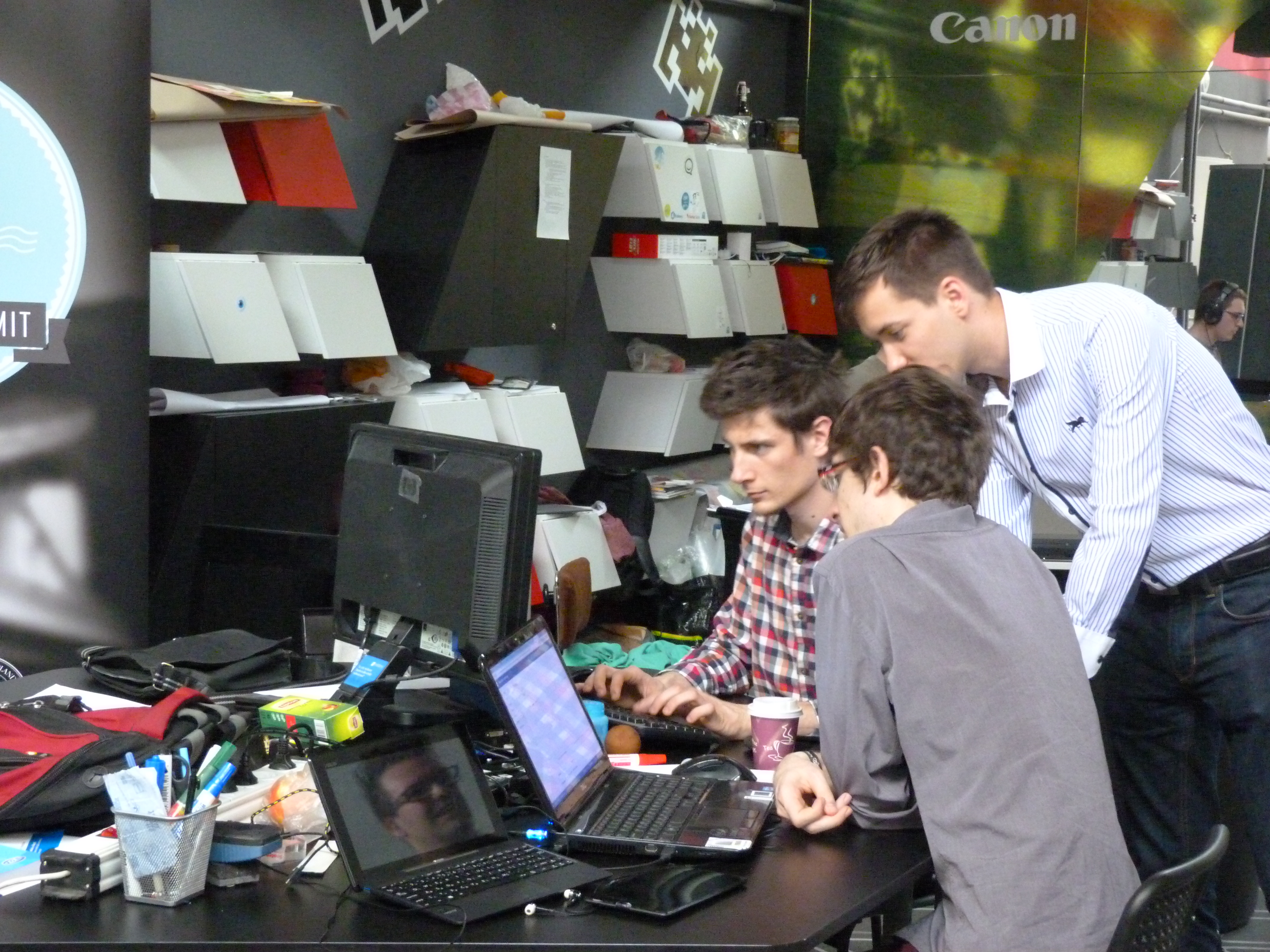
Mistory group (2015)

The Imagine Cup began in 2003 with approximately 1,000 competitors from 25 countries and regions and has grown to more than 2 million competitors representing 150 countries in 2022. The Imagine Cup World Championship has been held all over the globe. Since 2014, the Imagine Cup World Championship has been held in Seattle, United States.

- 2003: Barcelona, Spain – Theme: Link between people, information, systems, and devices, using Web services and. NET as the springboard.
- 2004: São Paulo, Brazil – Theme: Imagine a world where smart technology makes everyday life easier.
- 2005: Yokohama, Japan – Theme: Imagine a world where technology dissolves the boundaries between us.
- 2006: Agra & Delhi, India – Theme: Imagine a world where technology enables us to live healthier lives.
- 2007: Seoul, South Korea – Theme: Imagine a world where technology enables a better education for all.
- 2008: Paris, France – Theme: Imagine a world where technology enables a sustainable environment.
- 2009: Cairo, Egypt – Theme: Imagine a world where technology helps solve the world's toughest problems.
- 2010: Warsaw, Poland – Theme: Imagine a world where technology helps solve the world's toughest problems.
- 2011: New York City, United States – Theme: Imagine a world where technology helps solve the world's toughest problems.
- 2012: Sydney, Australia – Theme: Imagine a world where technology helps solve the world's toughest problems.
- 2013: Saint Petersburg, Russia – Theme: All dreams are now welcome.
- 2014: Seattle, United States
- 2015: Seattle, United States
- 2016: Seattle, United States
- 2017: Seattle, United States
- 2018: Seattle, United States
- 2019: Seattle, United States
- 2020: Digital event at Microsoft Build in Seattle, United States
- 2021: Digital event at Microsoft Build in Seattle, United States
- 2022: Seattle, United States
- 2023: Seattle, United States

== Competition structure ==
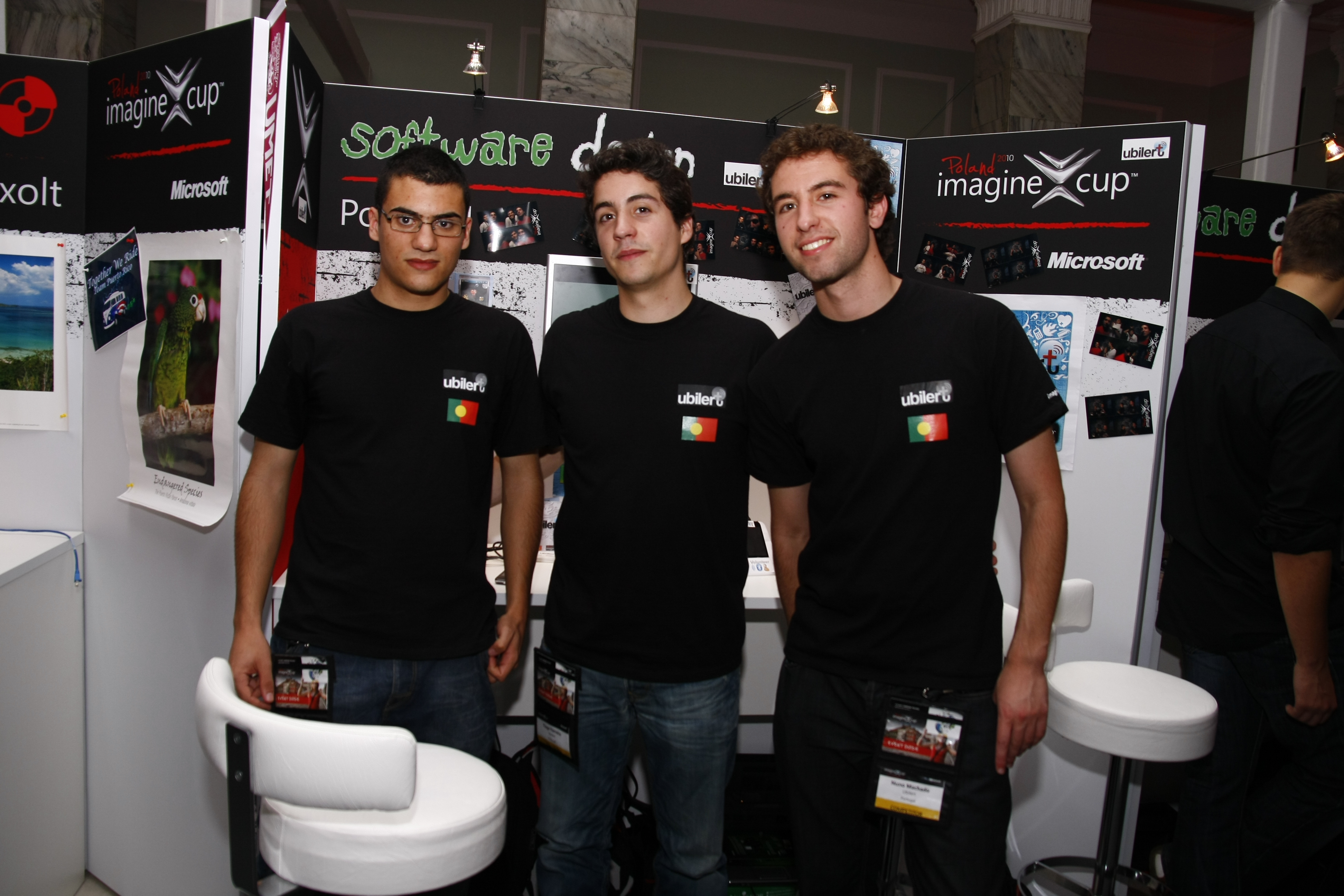
A team of competitors from Portugal - Imagine Cup Poland, 2010

All Imagine Cup competitors create projects that address the Imagine Cup theme: “Imagine a world where technology helps solve the toughest problems.”

=== Competitions ===
- Software Design
  The Software Design competition challenges participants to use technology to solve what they consider to be the toughest problems facing the world today. Using Microsoft tools and technology, competitors create software applications. Participants develop, test, and build their ideas into applications that can change the world.
- Game Design
  The Game Design Competition challenges participants to create a new game that illustrates the Imagine Cup theme.

== Winners ==
There are a number of competitions and challenges within the Imagine Cup. The Software Design category is the primary competition in which its winners take home the Imagine Cup trophy.

=== Software Design ===
Year	Gold	Silver	Bronze
2004	(France) Team EPITA; Aymeric Gaurat Apelli; Francois Beaussier; Guillaume Belmas; Vincent Vergonjeanne	(Russia) Team Inspiration (Ukraine) Stanislav Vonog (Russia) Nikolay Surin (Ukraine) Konstantin Zhereb (Ukraine) Taras Kushko	(Greece) Team SmartEyes; Eleni Korkontzila; Dimitrios Bisias; Styliani Taplidou; Nikolaos Trichakis
2005	(Russia) Team OmniMusic (Ukraine) Stanislav Vonog (Russia) Nikolay Surin (Russia) Alexander Popov (Russia) Ruslan Gilfanov		
2006	(Italy) Team Even.ctor; Giorgio Sardo; Massimo Paternoster; Silvia Perrone; Andrea Sossich	(Brazil) Team Trivial; Carlos Rodrigues; Ivan Cardim; Madson Menezes	(Norway) Team NTNU; Jan-Kristian Markiewicz; Gøran Hansen; Hans Olav Norheim; Jonas Follesø
2007	(Thailand) Team 3KC; Prachaya Phaisanwiphatpong; Vasan Chienmaneetaweesin; Jatupon Sukkasem; Pathompol Saeng-Uraiporn	(Korea) Team En#605/Project Finger Code; Prachaya Phaisanwiphatpong; Vasan Chienmaneetaweesin; Jatupon Sukkasem; Pathompol Saeng-Uraiporn	(Jamaica) Team ICAD; Imran Allie; Conroy Smith; Ayson Baxter; Damion Mitchel
2008	(Australia) Team SOAK; David Burela; Edward Hooper; Dimaz Pramudnya; Long Zheng	(Slovakia) Team Housekeepers; Dusan Zelenik; Jakub Simko; Michal Kompan; Marian Honsch	
2009	(Romania) Team Sytech; Adrian Buzgar; Calin Juravle; Andreas Resios	(Russia) Team VitalLab; Maxim Bovykin; Sergey Fedorov; Denis Gnatyuk; Alexey Klishin	
2010	(Thailand) Team Skeek; Krithee Sirisith; Pichai Sodsai; Thanasunn Dilokpinitnun; Nonthawat Srichad	(Serbia) Team TFZR; Zlatibor Veljković; Milan Kojadinović; Goran Nikolić; Vanja Zavišin	(New Zealand) Team OneBeep; Vinny Lohan; Steve Ward; Kayo Lakadia; Chanyeol Yoo
2011	(Republic of Ireland) Team Hermes; James McNamara; Calum Cawley; Matthew Padden; Aine Conaghan	(United States) Team Note-Taker; Qian Yan; Shashank Srinivas; David Hayden; Michael Astrauskas	(Jordan) Team OaSys; Yousef Wadi; Mohammad Azzam; Monir Abu Hilal; Hani Abu Huwaij
2012	(Ukraine) Team quadSquad; Stepanov Anton; Posternikov Anton; Osika Maxim; Jasakov Valery		
2013	(Portugal) Team For a Better World		
2014	(Australia) Team Eyenamia		
2015	(Brazil) Team EFitFashion		
2016	(Romania) Team ENTy		
2017	(Czech Republic) Team X.Glu		
2018	(Canada) Team SmartArm		
2019	(United States) Team EasyGlucose; Bryan Chiang	(India) Team Caeli; Bharat Sundal	(United Kingdom) Team Finderr; Ferdinand Loesch; Choon Kiat Lee; Sachin Sriskanda

=== Office Designer ===
Year	Gold	Silver	Bronze
2005	(Brazil) Team Solvent-OD; Andre Furtado; Adeline Silva; Madson Menezes; Raony Araujo	(Russia) Team FIBRA; Sergey Dubovi; Pavel Zadumkin; Dmitry Kozlov; Anastasiya Filinova	(Russia) Team Paladin; Liu Teifeng; Yang Yongzhi; He Cong; Yang Lizhen

=== Web Development ===
Year	Gold	Silver	Bronze
2007	(France) Team APB; Benjamin Talmard; Thomas Albisser; Pierrick Blons; Sebastien Lam	(Republic of Ireland) Team Red Dawn; Mohamed Alsalehi; Marouf Azad	(China) Team Frontfree Studio-Web; Jiasheng Guo; Weining Sha; Xia Xiao; Zhenda Zhao

=== Embedded Development Competition ===
Year	Gold	Silver	Bronze
2007	(Brazil) Team TriventDreams ED Andre Furtado; Carlos Rodrigues; Ivan Cardim; Roberto Sonnino		
2008	(Singapore) Team Trail Blazers	(Republic of Ireland) Team AcidRain (China) Team Wings	(Poland) Team Aero@PUT
2009	(South Korea) Team Wafree	(China) Team iSee	
2010	(Taiwan) Team SmarterME	(Russia) Team MCPU	(France) Team GERAS
2011	(Taiwan) NTHUCS	(China) Harmonicare	(Romania) Endeavour_Design

=== Interoperability Challenge ===
Year	Gold	Silver	Bronze
2008	(India) SKAN; Sameet Singh Khajuria; Karun AB; Amith George; Noel Sequeira	(Brazil) Ecologix; Carlos Eduardo Rodrigues; Eduardo Sonnino; Renato Ferreira; Roberto Sonnino	(Poland) Together; Dariusz Walczak; Marcin Wrzos; Piotr Sikora; Tomasz Nowak
2009	(Brazil) Proativa Team; Amirton Chagas; Flavio Almeida; Joao Paulo Oliveira Santos; Lucas Mello	(Jordan) ECRAM; Mohammed Y. Eshbeata; Laith Dawahir; Wassim Shehadeh	(Poland) Fteams; Tomasz Ciejka; Grzegorz Glonek; Jacek Pintera; Krzysztof Szokal-Egird
2010	(Jamaica) Xormis; Shawn Mclean; Derron Brown; Dwayne Samuels; Markel Mairs	(Brazil) Uptiva Dreams IT; Hugo Rodrigues; Edmiel Leandro; Daniel Ferreira; Eduardo Sonnino	(Indonesia) Chandradimuka; Yudha Antawiryawan; Kania Audrint; Anggunmeka Luhur Prasasti; Widyara Desgita
2011	(Greece) Team Alaniarides; Giorgos Karakatsiotis; Vangos Pterneas	(Brazil) Bells Team; Daniel Ferreira; Lucas Mello; Amirton Chagas; Joao Paulo dos Santos Oliveira	(Poland) DemosceneSpirit; Lukasz Michniewicz; Szymon Majewski; Marek Banaszak; Magdalena Dudarska

=== Game Design ===
Year	Gold	Silver	Bronze
2008	(Brazil) Team Mother Gaia Studio Rafael Costa; Guilhermr Campos; Helena Van Kampen; Tulio Marques Soria	(Belgium) Drunk Puppy Productions Kenny Deriemaeker; Timothy Vanherberghen; Filip Van Bouwel; Jeroen Van Raevels	(Korea) GomZ Dong HoonKim; KiHwan Kim; Min My Park
2009	(Brazil) Team LEVV It Luciano José; Edgar Neto; Vinícius Ottoni; Victor Rafael	(United States) Epsylon Games	(United Kingdom) Sanguine Labs
2010	(Philippines) Team By Implication	(Belgium) NomNom Productions	(France) Green Gears Studio
2011 Mobile	(France) Geekologic	(France) Close World Mobile	(United States) Team Dragon Pierre Elias; Eric Lee; Veronica Burkel; Chase Sandmann
2011 Web	(Poland) Cellardoor	(Philippines) Signum Fidei Thomas Tiam-Lee; Jenina Chua; Jeriah Miranda; Keven Hernandez	(Slovakia) Quegee Team
2011 Windows/Xbox	(Brazil) Signum Games	(Thailand) JubJub	(Czech Republic) WickedTeam
2012 Windows/Xbox	(Thailand) TANG Thai		
2014	(Russia) Brainy Studio	(South Korea) BOMON	(Egypt) Illogic
2015	(Russia) IzHard	(Netherlands) Kuality Games	(China) Thief
2016	(Thailand) PH21		

=== IT Challenge ===
Year	Gold	Silver	Bronze
2005	(France) Stefan Plizga	(Romania) Emanuel Pentescu	(Austria) Andreas Tomek
2006	(Austria) Andreas Tomek	(Romania) Valy Greavu	(France) Daniel Boteanu
2007	(China) Zhifeng Chen	(France) Romain Larmet	(Romania) Ilie Cosmin Viorel
2008	(France) Jean-Benoit Paux	(Romania) Cosmin Ilie	(China) Yan Liu
2009	(Romania) Cosmin Ilie	(China) Wu Chang	(Bolivia) Miklos Cari Sivila
2010	(China) WeiQiu Wen	(Bolivia) Miklos Cari Sivila	(Singapore) zxc1984
2011	(France) Jean-Sébastien Duchêne	(Poland) Błażej Matuszyk	(Singapore) Yunheng Mong

=== Digital Media ===
Year	Gold	Silver	Bronze
2010	(Taiwan) Mirror Vita	(Saudi Arabia) Dreaming Spirits	(Singapore) Woolgathering
2011	(Romania) M.N.A.	(Oman) Brothers Forever	(Taiwan) CottonCandy

=== Health Awareness Awards ===
Year	Gold	Silver	Bronze
2012	(Italy) FifthElement Project Matteo Valoriani; Antimo Musone; Daniele Midi; Antonio Vecchio	N/A	N/A

=== Connected Planet Award ===
Year	Gold	Silver	Bronze
2013	(India) Y Nots	N/A	N/A

=== Microsoft Azure (Cloud) ===
Year	Gold	Silver	Bronze
2013	(Pakistan) Y Nots	(Ukraine) nLife	(China) LetssGo

=== Windows Phone ===
Year	Gold	Silver	Bronze
2011	(South Korea) HOMERUN	(South Korea) Zipi Zigi	(United States) Lifelens; Tristan Gibeau; Cy Khormaee; Wilson To; Jason Wakizaka
2012	(Egypt) Vivid; Noureldien Hussein (Nour El-Dien Hussein); Muhammad El-Orabi; Kariem El-Shazly	(Poland) The Stack; Karol Stosik	(Finland) Aaltovation; Apurva Jaiswal; Irena Prochkova; Gitanjali Sachdeva; Maimuna Syed

=== Windows 7 Touch Challenge ===
Year	Gold	Silver	Bronze
2011	(France) Team India Rose; Anthony Froissant; José Martins	(Indonesia) _dreambender_	(Japan) IUVO

=== World Citizenship Competition ===
Year	Gold	Silver	Bronze
2013	(Portugal) For a Better World	(Taiwan) Omni-Hearing Solution	(Australia) Foodbank Local
2014	(Australia) Eyenaemia	(Taiwan) SMART Crew	(Republic of Ireland) Access Earth; Matthew McCann; Jack Gallagher; KC Grant; Donal McClean
2015	(Australia) Virtual Dementia Experience	(Singapore) Mozter	(Greece) Prognosis
2016	(Greece) AMANDA	(Tunisia) Night's Watch	(Hungary) InSimu

=== Innovation Competition ===
Year	Gold	Silver	Bronze
2013	(United Kingdom) soundSYNK; Robert Parker; Alex Bochenski; Jonathan Neumann; Edward Noel	(Slovenia) Dora	(Thailand) SkyPACS
2014	(New Zealand) Estimeet; Hayden Do; Jason Wei; Chris Duan; Derek Zhu	(Hungary) Tep	(Bahrain) ButterFly
2015	(Brazil) eFitFashion	(Azerbaijan) NoObs Team	(United Kingdom) Siymb
2016	(Romania) ENTy	(Sri Lanka) Bit Masters	(United States) HealthX

=== Facebook Creativity Award ===
Year	Gold	Silver	Bronze
2014	(Cyprus) ij Developers		
2013	(Ecuador) Team Ayni		

=== AppCampus Award ===
Year	Gold	Silver	Bronze
2014	(Hungary) Tep (Russia) Brainy Studio		

=== Skype Award ===
Year	Gold	Silver	Bronze
2014	Drive Social Impact (Australia) Eyenaemia Learning and Education (Nepal) Code Buzzers; Innovate and Collaborate (South Africa) Super Sea Dragons		

=== Visual Studio Online Boost ===
Year	Gold	Silver	Bronze
2014	(Greece) Genesis (Slovakia) LeapKin (Germany) Tutus (Uruguay) flipped.uy (Algeria) RELOAD (Lebanon) Learn n' Earn (Kenya) BiDE Code (Uganda) AfriGal Tech (Israel) Flow		

=== Apps For Office Challenge ===
Year	Gold	Silver	Bronze
2014	(China) iGeek (India) CodeBlue		

=== Windows & Windows Phone Challenge ===
Year	Gold	Silver	Bronze
2014	(Venezuela) Pomato Apps		

=== User Experience Challenge ===
Year	Gold	Silver	Bronze
2014	World Citizenship (United States) Team HCI/d; Games (United States) Team Silicon; Innovation (Philippines) Hiraya; Gabriel Eric Villanueva; Jomarie Anne Marquez; Neo John Tuquero		

=== Pitch Video Challenge ===
Year	Gold	Silver	Bronze
2014	World Citizenship (Republic of Ireland) Team Symbiote Games (Romania) Team Sticky Bits; Innovation (United States) Team Mote Labs		
2015	World Citizenship (Republic of Ireland) Rapid Response		

=== Project Blueprint Challenge ===
Year	Gold	Silver	Bronze
2014	World Citizenship (Brazil) Team Life Up Games (Brazil) Liaison Team; Innovation (Denmark) YouBeRu		

== Innovation Accelerator ==
The Imagine Cup Innovation Accelerator was a program that, between 2006 and 2008, provided Imagine Cup Software Design teams with direction on the next stage of developing their innovative ideas into a business. Each year, between 2006 and 2008, six teams were selected for the Innovation Accelerator program. Participants in the Innovation Accelerator program travelled to the Microsoft Mountain View campus in Silicon Valley and received technical support and business coaching to create the must-have technology and communications applications of the future. In 2010, Microsoft began inviting every Imagine Cup team to participate in its new program for startups: Microsoft BizSpark. With this program, startups receive access to current, full-featured software development tools and platforms.

Previous teams include:

- 2006: Brazil, China, Croatia, Germany, Italy, Norway, India
- 2007: Ireland, Jamaica, Korea, Mexico, Poland, Thailand,
- 2008: Australia, France, Germany, Hungary, Slovakia, South Africa,

== Imagine Cup Grant ==
A three-year, $3 million competitive grant program was established by Microsoft in 2011 to support a select number of winning teams’ solutions to go to market and realize its potential to solve a critical global problem. The inaugural grant recipients were announced at the World Economic Forum in Davos, Switzerland on January 27, 2012, which included the following teams:

- Team Lifelens from the United States
- Team Apptenders from Croatia
- Team Falcon Dev from Ecuador
- Team OaSys from Jordan

The grant packages include US$75,000 for each team, as well as software, cloud computing services, solution provider support, premium Microsoft BizSpark account benefits and access to local resources such as the Microsoft Innovation Centers. Microsoft will also connect grant recipients with its network of investors, nongovernmental organization partners and business partners.

For the 2012 version of the competition, the following teams were announced in December 2012. The teams are:

- Team Graphmasters from Germany. The team members are: Christian Brüggemann, Sebastian Heise and Iulian Nitescu.
- Team StethoCloud from Australia. The team members are: Hon Weng Chong, Andrew Lin, Mahsa Salehi and Karthik Rajah.
- Team Vivid from Egypt. The team members are: Noureldien Hussein (Nour El-Dien Hussein), Muhammed Mousa El-Orabi and Fady Fawzy Rafla.
- Team Cipher256 from Uganda The team members are: Aaron Tushabe, Joshua Okello, Dr. Davis Musinguzi, Josiah Kavuma and Joseph Kaizzi.
- Team QuadSquad from Ukraine. The team members are: Maxim Osika, Valeriy Yasakov, Anton Stepanov, Anton Posternikov and Dmytro Samoilenko.

== Recognition ==
Imagine Cup participants from around the world who won their regional competitions in 2010 have been recognized by their government leaders. In October 2010, two Imagine Cup 2010 United States finalists (Wilson To from the Mobilifeteam and Christian Hood from BeastWare) were invited to participate in the White House Science Fair. New Zealand's Prime Minister, Hon. John Key sent Team OneBeep from New Zealand a personal letter that congratulated them on their third-place finish. Team Skeek from Thailand, winners of the 2010 Software Design competition, met Dr. Khunying Kalaya Sophonpanich, a member of Parliament and Secretary General of The Rajapruek Institute Foundation. Microsoft Poland and members of the European Parliament hosted the “Pushing the Boundaries of Innovation” conference in Brussels. Imagine Cup teams from Poland (fteams and Mutants), Serbia (TFZR), Germany (Mediator), and Belgium (Nom Nom Productions) were in attendance. Greek Imagine Cup winners, Giorgos Karakatsiotis and Vangos Pterneas, of Megadodo, met with the Prime Minister of Greece, George Papandreou, and demonstrated their project that creates personalized descriptions of museum exhibits based on the user's needs. Teams Xormis and Educ8 from Jamaica were honored with a special luncheon hosted by the Government of Jamaica that included an address from Hon. Bruce Golding, the prime minister. Team Think Green had the opportunity to meet with Ivo Josipović, President of Croatia.

== See also ==
- Imagine Cup Sri Lanka Page
