= Cisco certifications =

Certifications offered by Cisco Systems

Cisco certifications are the list of the certifications offered by Cisco. There are four to five (path to network designers) levels of certification: Associate (CCNA/CCDA), Professional (CCNP/CCDP), Expert (CCIE/CCDE), and recently, Architect (CCAr: CCDE previous), as well as nine different paths for the specific technical field; Routing & Switching, Design, Industrial Network, Network Security, Service Provider, Service Provider Operations, Storage Networking, Voice, Datacenter, and Wireless.
There are also a number of specialist technicians, sales, business, data center certifications, and CCAI certified instructors (Cisco Academy Instructor).

== Paths to Certification ==
The table below shows the different paths and levels for Cisco Certifications. All Certifications, except for CCAr, requires the passing of one or more theoretical exams offered by Pearson VUE. CCIE Certifications also require a hands-on exam administered at special labs around the world.

Certification Paths
Level	Enterprise Infrastructure	Enterprise Wireless	Collaboration	Data Center	Security	Service Provider	Design	DevNet	Cybersecurity Operations
Expert	CCIE Enterprise Infrastructure	CCIE Enterprise Wireless	CCIE Collaboration	CCIE Data Center	CCIE Security	CCIE Service Provider	CCDE	CCDvE	-
Professional	CCNP Enterprise		CCNP Collaboration	CCNP Data Center	CCNP Security	CCNP Service Provider	-	CCDvP	CCCyP
Associate	CCNA							CCDvA	CCCyA
Entry	CCST								

As of October 1, 2023, Cisco has altered their certification structure.

- 2 entry level certificates: CCST
- 3 associate level certificates: CCNA, Cisco Certified DevNet Associate, and Cisco Certified CyberOps Associate.
- 7 professional level certificates : Cisco Certified DevNet Professional, CCNP Enterprise, CCNP Collaboration, CCNP Data Center, CCNP Security, CCNP Service Provider, and Cisco Certified CyberOps Professional
- 8 expert level certificates : CCIE Collaboration, CCIE Data Center, DevNet Expert, CCDE, CCIE Enterprise Infrastructure, CCIE Enterprise Wireless, CCIE Security, CCIE Service Provider

As of February 24, 2020, Cisco altered their certification structure.

- 1 entry level certificate: CCT
- 3 associate level certificates: CCNA, CC DevNet Associate, and CC CyberOps Associate.
- 7 professional level certificates : CCNP DevNet, CCNP Enterprise, CCNP Collaboration, CCNP Data Center, CCNP Security, CCNP Service Provider, and CC CyberOps Professional
- 7 expert level certificates : CCDE, CCIE Infrastructure, CCIE Enterprise Wireless, CCIE Collaboration, CCIE Data Center, CCIE Security, and CCIE Service provider.

== Primary Certifications ==
=== Cisco Certified Entry Networking Technician (CCENT) ===
Cisco Certified Entry Networking Technician {CCENT} represents the lowest level of certification which covers basic networking knowledge. Until its introduction, CCNA represented the first level of the certification program. It has appropriate use for an entry-level network support position. CCENT certified staff can install, manage and troubleshoot a small enterprise network, including basic network security. The first step towards a CCNA certification must start by having a CCENT. In 2017, Cisco introduced new ICND1 and ICND2 exams (needed for the new CCNA Routing and Switching). ICND1: 100-105 (Interconnecting Cisco Networking Devices Part 1 v3.0) became the new exam required for CCENT. With this change, CCENT became a sufficient pre-requirement for CCNA Security, CCNA Voice and CCNA Wireless.

It is valid for 3 years.

=== Cisco Certified Technicians (CCT) ===
As of September 2024, there were 3 domains available for CCT certification:

- CCT Collaboration - valid for 3 years.
- CCT Routing and Switching - valid for 3 years.
- CCT Data Center - valid for 3 years.

=== Associate Certifications ===
==== CCNA Routing and Switching ====
The CCNA Routing and Switching certification covered skills necessary to administer devices on small or medium-sized networks. This certification required the ICND1 100-105 and ICND2 200-105 exams.

Pearson VUE test centers conduct these exams.

All CCNA-certified individuals specialize by technology. Previously, specialized tracks required passing and maintaining a CCNA certification, but with the expiration of the 640 series tests this is no longer the case. As of autumn 2015, the CCNA Certification has no prerequisites.

Starting 24 February 2020, all CCNA specializations were consolidated. The 200-301 Cisco Certified Network Associate exam is now the only exam available at CCNA-level.

Valid for 3 years.

Retired on February 23, 2020

==== CCDA ====
Cisco-Certified Design Associate (CCDA) certified engineers can design switched or routed networks of LANs, WANs and broadband services. The CCDA exam (200-310 DESGN) requires a CCENT at a minimum, though either CCNA or CCIE will serve as a prerequisite, as well SWITCH-level knowledge of Cisco-based LANs.

Valid for 3 years.

Retired on February 23, 2020

==== CCNA Cloud ====
Valid for 3 years.

Retired on February 23, 2020

==== CCNA Collaboration ====
The Cisco Certified Collaboration Associate certification is for Cisco engineers who specialize in Cisco's Unified Communications (UC) products. Collaboration engineers focus on the deployment and support of voice, video, and live text communication solutions across IP networks.

Valid for 3 years.

Retired on February 23, 2020

==== CCNA CyberOps ====
The CCNA Cyber Ops certification prepares candidates to begin a career working with associate-level cybersecurity analysts within security operations centers.

Valid for 3 years.

Retired on May 28, 2020

==== CCNA Industrial ====
The Cisco Certified Network Associate Industrial (CCNA Industrial) certification was valid for 3 years.

Retired on February 23, 2020

==== CCNA Security ====
CCNA Security validates knowledge of security infrastructure, threats, and vulnerabilities to networks and threat mitigation. Required skills include installation, troubleshooting and monitoring of network devices to maintain the integrity, confidentiality, and availability of data and devices. To earn this certification one must pass the 210-260 IINS (Implementing Cisco IOS Network Security) exam, as well as hold a current CCNA certification. The CCNA-Security is a prerequisite to the CCNP Security certification. It represents the required exam to earn the certification and for continuing the security certification path to the CCNP.

Note: The CCNA Security courseware holds compliance with the NSA and CNSS training standard of CNSS 4011. By remaining compliant, the CCNA Security program provides the required training for network security professionals who assist private sector entities and federal agencies of the United States, protects their information and aid in the defense of the United States IT infrastructure. Candidates who have passed the CCNA Security will receive a letter of recognition acknowledging they have met the CNSS 4011 training requirements.

Valid for 3 years.

Retired on February 23, 2020

==== CCNA Service Provider ====
Part 1 is a 5-day instructor-led course that provides the basic knowledge and skills necessary to support a service provider network. The course provides knowledge of the major network components and helps learners to understand how service provider networks function. The course introduces IP Next-Generation Network (IP NGN) architecture. The course also includes remote labs that help gain practical skills for deploying basic Cisco IOS / IOS XE and Cisco IOS XR software features. Part 2 is a 5-day instructor-led course that provides knowledge of network construction and IP NGN architecture. The course includes additional remote labs.

Valid for 3 years.

Retired on February 23, 2020

==== CCNA Wireless ====
The CCNA Wireless certification covers wireless LANs, including networking associates/administrators, wireless support specialists, and WLAN project managers. The certification validates skills in the configuration, implementation, and support of wireless LANs. 200-355 WIFUND (Implementing Cisco Wireless Networking Essentials) is the required exam.

Valid for 3 years.

Retired on February 23, 2020

=== Professional Certifications ===
Cisco Certified Network Professional (CCNP) Certifications validate knowledge and skills required to install, configure, and troubleshoot converged local- and wide-area networks with 100 to 500 or more end-devices. One needs a valid CCNA certification to obtain a CCNP certification.

==== CCNP Routing and Switching ====
The CCNP validates the ability to plan, implement, verify, and troubleshoot local and wide-area enterprise networks and work collaboratively with specialists on advanced security, voice, wireless, and video solutions. In addition to CCNA Exams, professionals must pass three separate professional-level exams. The certification track changed in July 2010, with various migration paths available for those that had begun, but not completed, the CCNP certification process. In July 2014, Cisco released version 2.0 of the CCNP exams and training courses, "to reflect the alignment with changing industry job roles and the addition of new study materials." 29 January 2015 was the last day to test using the v1.0 exams. As of 30 January 2015, only the v2.0 exam is offered.

Required exams (v1.0):

- 642-902 ROUTE: Implementing Cisco IP Routing (ROUTE)
- 642-813 SWITCH: Implementing Cisco IP Switched Networks (SWITCH)
- 642-832 TSHOOT: Troubleshooting and Maintaining Cisco IP Networks (TSHOOT)

Required exams (v2.0):

- 300-101 ROUTE: Implementing Cisco IP Routing (ROUTE)
- 300-115 SWITCH: Implementing Cisco IP Switched Networks (SWITCH)
- 300-135 TSHOOT: Troubleshooting and Maintaining Cisco IP Networks (TSHOOT)

Retired on February 23, 2020 Check CCNP Enterprise Architecture.

==== CCDP ====
With a CCDP certification, a network professional can discuss, design, and create advanced addressing and routing, security, network management, data center, and IP multicast enterprise architectures that include virtual private networking and wireless domains. An active CCDA certification acts as a prerequisite for this certification.

Required exams:

- 300-101 ROUTE: Implementing Cisco IP Routing (ROUTE)
- 300-115 SWITCH: Implementing Cisco IP Switched Networks (SWITCH)
- 300-320 ARCH: Designing Cisco Network Service Architecture

Note that CCDP requires 300-101 ROUTE and 300-115 SWITCH. After passing CCNP and CCDA, CCDP requires only 300-320 ARCH.

Retired on February 23, 2020

==== CCNP Collaboration ====
You are required to pass these four exams: 300-070 CIPTV1 Implementing Cisco IP Telephony and Video, Part 1 (CIPTV1)
300-075 CIPTV2 Implementing Cisco IP Telephony and Video, Part 2 (CIPTV2)
300-080 CTCOLLAB Troubleshooting Cisco IP Telephony and Video (CTCOLLAB)
300-085 CAPPS Implementing Cisco Collaboration Applications (CAPPS)

==== CCNP Data Center ====
CCNP Data Center validates knowledge of data center design, equipment installation, and maintenance.

Five required exams:

- 300-175 DCUCI Implementing Cisco Data Center Unified Computing (DCUCI)
- 300-165 DCII Implementing Cisco Data Center Infrastructure (DCII)
- 300-170 DCVAI Implementing Cisco Data Center Virtualization and Automation (DCVAI)
- 300-160 DCID Designing Cisco Data Center Infrastructure (DCID)

OR

- 300-180 DCIT Troubleshooting Cisco Data Center Infrastructure (DCIT)

==== CCNP Security ====
Formerly Cisco Certified Security Professional (CCSP).

The CCNP Security certification program aligns to the job role of the Cisco Network Security Engineer, who has responsibility for security in routers, switches, networking devices, and appliances, as well as choosing, deploying, supporting, and troubleshooting firewalls, VPNS, and IDS/IPS solutions for their networking environments. The CCNP Security certification no longer requires CCNA Security or any other Certification. The CCNP has no prerequisites, but Cisco recommends three to five years of experience.

==== CCNP Service Provider ====
The CCNP Service Provider certification replaced the retiring CCIP certification.

Required exams:

- 642-883 SPROUTE: Deploying Cisco Service Provider Network Routing
- 642-885 SPADVROUTE: Deploying Cisco Service Provider Advanced Routing
- 642-887 SPCORE: Implementing Cisco Service Provider Next-Generation Core Network Services
- 642-889 SPEDGE: Implementing Cisco Service Provider Next-Generation Edge Network Services

==== CCNP Wireless ====
CCNP Wireless covers all aspects of wireless networking principles and theory. This certification requires four tests, covering Wireless Site Survey, Wireless Voice Networks, Wireless Mobility Services, and Wireless Security. The prerequisite acts as a valid CCNA Wireless certification.

Required exams:

- 642-732 CUWSS: Conducting Cisco Unified Wireless Site Survey (CUWSS)
- 642-742 IUWVN: Implementing Cisco Unified Wireless Voice Networks (IUWVN)
- 642-747 IUWMS: Implementing Cisco Unified Wireless Mobility Services (IUWMS)
- 642-737 IAUWS: Implementing Advanced Cisco Unified Wireless Security (IAUWS)

Retired on February 23, 2020

=== Expert-level Certifications ===
Cisco Certified Internetwork Expert represents Cisco's highest certification, comprising seven tracks at present, tracks are updated and retired frequently and are aligned to the latest industry technologies and trends. As of October 6, 2010, 25,810 people held active CCIE Certifications. CertMag, voted it as the most technically advanced IT certification and statistics generally report it as the highest salaried certification in IT salary surveys.

CCIE began in 1993, originally with a two-day lab, later changing to a one-day format. Fewer than 3% of Cisco-certified individuals attain CCIE certification and, on average, spend thousands of dollars and 18 months studying before passing. Many candidates build training labs at home using old equipment, then sell it to other candidates after passing. Alternatively, candidates may rent "rack time" online. The CCIE consists of a written exam and a "lab" exam (in each track). The written exam acts as a prerequisite of the lab exam and has a cost of $400 per attempt. The written exam consists of 100 questions that must be completed within 2 hours. Upon passing the written exam, the candidate has eighteen months to take the lab exam. The candidate has three years after passing the written exam to successfully complete the lab. The lab is an eight-hour, hands-on exam designed to demonstrate that the candidate knows Internetworking theory and demonstrates advanced hands-on mastery. Candidates that do not pass the CCIE lab in that interval must re-pass the written exam before again attempting the CCIE lab exam. The minimum waiting time between attempts is one month.

As of July 2014, the CCIE Lab costs $1600 per attempt and ten Cisco locations offer it worldwide. Some of these locations do not offer all CCIE tracks. According to a Cisco survey, $9050 represents the average cost to prepare for CCIE certification as of April 2006, which gets spent mostly on practice equipment and study material. No formal prerequisites currently exist for the CCIE written exam, but Cisco recommends at least 3–5 years networking experience. CCIE exists as the first Cisco Certified qualification and no other Certifications have existed previously. The associate and professional Certifications recognized the fact that CCIE is overkill for many networking personnel. Cisco has chosen not to make lower level Certifications prerequisites for the CCIE certification.

One may have the knowledge to hold multiple CCIE Certifications. Adam McCombs cited this qualification as "essentially a PhD in the internet" in Season 1 Episode 10 of Shark Tank.

Upon successful completion of the lab exam, Cisco awards a CCIE number to a new CCIE. The first CCIE number allocated (in 1993) started at 1,024 and increased thereafter. As of August 2011, the highest CCIE number allocated reached just over 30,000. The first number they allocated to the first CCIE lab location, rather than to an individual, and featured as a plaque at the entrance to the lab. They awarded Number 1025 to Stuart Biggs, who created the first written exam and first lab exam. The first person to pass both CCIE written and lab exams, known as Terry Slattery, consulted at Cisco when the lab began development. Slattery held the first CCIE who did not work for Cisco. Each CCIE retains their number regardless of how many Certifications he or she receives. Every two years a CCIE has to take a written test to retain the certification. If not done, the certification becomes suspended. After one further year without passing, the certification becomes revoked. One can then only regain the certification by starting from scratch. Re-certification can occur up to 2 years before the expiration date. After certification/re-certification, a CCIE must wait 6 months before re-certifying.

CCIE Lab Exams are administered only at special CCIE Lab Test Centers around the world. However, all the tracks for testing may not be available at a lab location.

Lab Location	Routing and Switching	Collaboration	Data Center	Security	Service Provider	Wireless
Bangalore, India	Yes	Yes	Yes	Yes	No	
Beijing, China	Yes	Yes	Yes	Yes	Yes	No
Brussels, Belgium	Yes	Yes	Yes	Yes	Yes	Yes
Dubai, United Arab Emirates	Yes	Yes	Yes	Yes	Yes	No
Hong Kong, China	Yes	Yes	Yes	Yes	Yes	No
Research Triangle Park, United States	Yes	Yes	Yes	Yes	Yes	Yes
San Jose, United States	Yes	Yes	Yes	Yes	Yes	Yes
Sydney, Australia	Yes	Yes	Yes	Yes	Yes	Yes
Tokyo, Japan	Yes	Yes	Yes	Yes	No	No
Mobile Labs	Yes	No	Yes	Yes	Yes	No

==== CCAr ====
The Cisco Certified Architect (CCAr) certification program trains students to meet the responsibilities of the Cisco Certified Architect:

- Lead creation and evolution of enterprise architecture
- Analyze technology and industry market trends
- Establish governing principles for Enterprise networks
- Selection of technology and products
- Identification of organization resource needs
- Lead the development of communication and education plan for enterprise network architecture

==== CCIE Routing and Switching ====
Routing and Switching seem by far the most popular track, with 35,272 worldwide certified individuals as of May 18, 2012. The certification covers a variety of networking concepts and protocols.

Retired. Check CCIE Enterprise Infrastructure .

==== CCDE ====
CCDE runs in parallel with the more established CCIE program, in some areas providing a higher skill-set than CCIE. Specifically, CCDE identifies network professionals who have expert network design skills. Network design translates business requirements into end-to-end network designs and a solutions approach to network expansion and integration. CCDE focuses on network architecture and does not cover implementation and operations. CCDE supplies a vendor-neutral curriculum, testing business requirements analysis, design, planning, and validation practices. The course came about because employers needed a way to identify experienced network designers and architects who could address all aspects of existing and new networking technologies and trends. While engineers (including many CCIEs) had fulfilled this role, certification had not advanced beyond the CCDP certification. CCDE numbering adopts a different format than CCIE and appears split into a year and number within that year. It uses the same CCIE tools to verify qualified status. CCDE certified individuals can use CCIE qualification exams to re-certify and vice versa. CCDE provides advanced network infrastructure design principles and fundamentals for large networks. A CCDE can demonstrate an ability to develop solutions which address planning, design, integration, optimization, operations, security, and ongoing support focused at the infrastructure level.

==== CCIE Collaboration ====
The Voice track covers advanced topics in subjects such as Quality of Service, MGCP, Cisco Call Manager (Cisco's VoIP PBX), Cisco Unity Connection (Cisco's Voice Messaging platform), Unity Express, Unified Contact Center Express, Cisco Unified Presence Server, Cisco's HWIC-4ESW, and the 3750-24PS. Most candidates pass after three or four lab attempts, but some have required more than six. Many have reputed that the lab exam seems as much a test of time management and planning as of technical expertise. The widely dissimilar platforms used sets the Voice lab exam apart from other CCIE lab exams. One must make configurations on the Windows Server environment, a CallManager web-based GUI, and the IOS command line. As such, it involves a lot of back-and-forth fine tuning between the numerous platforms.

In May 2013, Cisco announced it will retire the CCIE Voice track and introduce the new CCIE Collaboration track, including new topics such as virtualization, Jabber instant messaging and video. After protest from current and aspirant CCIE Voice holders, whom argued that the differences remain too few to warrant retiring the track with no option to transition to the new track, Cisco offered a transition path for existing Voice holders. The Collaboration written exam may have availability starting from November 21, 2013. The lab exam will transition from Voice to Collaboration on February 14, 2014.

==== CCIE Data Center ====
Cisco has announced the September availability of a CCIE Data Center certification, which certifies the expert-level skills required to plan, prepare, operate, monitor, and troubleshoot complex data center networks. The CCIE Data Center written exam will be available Sept. 3, 2012; the lab exam should have availability in October.

==== CCIE Security ====
The Security track covers advanced topics in subjects such as ASA, FirePower, IOS security, Wireless Security, Content Security, Antimalware Protection and many others.

==== CCIE Service Provider ====
The Cisco CCIE Service Provider (CCIE SP) certification is for network engineers who configure, build, troubleshoot, and optimize a Service Provider IP NGN core infrastructure. Candidates for the CCIE SP certification are expected to have knowledge of IP core, aggregation/edge, and remote access technologies, Layer 2 and 3 VPNs, and managed services traversing an IP core network.

==== CCIE Wireless ====
CCIE Wireless certification exams assess candidates on theoretical knowledge of wireless networking and an understanding of wireless local area networking (WLAN) technologies from Cisco.

Retired. Check CCIE Enterprise Wireless

== Specialist Certification ==
In addition to the vast amount of Certifications above, Cisco also provides Meraki Specialist Certifications.
The exams for these Certifications are often focused on some specific technology and generally targeted at members of the Cisco Partner Program, including those selling, designing, or supporting Cisco products and services. By combining various exams, a Cisco partner can gain specialty status and thus qualify for additional partner benefits.

Specializations can be held at Express, Advanced and Master levels, reflecting the depth of a partners skills across certain technologies and architectures, and can be held in both a Technology portfolio, or an architecture. Specializations are:

- Business: Business Value Practitioner, Business Value Specialist
- Business Architecture Specialist, Business Architecture Practitioner
- Enterprise IT Business Specialist
- Collaboration
- Data Center
- Internet of Things
- Network Programmability
- Operating System Software
- Security
- Service Provider

== See also ==
- Cisco Networking Academy
