= List of University of Ceylon people =

The following is a list of notable people associated with the University of Ceylon (1942–52), University of Ceylon, Peradeniya (1952–72) and University of Ceylon, Colombo (1967–1972).

== Chancellors ==
University of Ceylon

- 1942–44 Andrew Caldecott
- 1944–49 Henry Monck-Mason Moore
- 1949–52 Lord Soulbury

University of Ceylon, Peradeniya

- 1952–54 Lord Soulbury
- 1954–62 Oliver Goonetilleke
- 1962–72 William Gopallawa

University of Ceylon, Colombo

- 1967–72 William Gopallawa

== Pro-Chancellor ==
- 1942-47 C. W. W. Kannangara
- 1947-52 E. A. Nugawela
- 1952-56 M. D. Banda

== Vice-Chancellors ==
University of Ceylon

- 1942–52 Ivor Jennings

University of Ceylon, Peradeniya

- 1952–55 Ivor Jennings
- 1955–66 Nicholas Attygalle
- 1966–68 S. J. Walpita
- 1968–69 M. J. Perera
- 1969–71 E. O. E. Pereira

University of Ceylon, Colombo

- 1967 O. H. de A. Wijesekera
- 1968–69 Walwin A. de Silva
- 1969–72 B. A. Abeywickrema

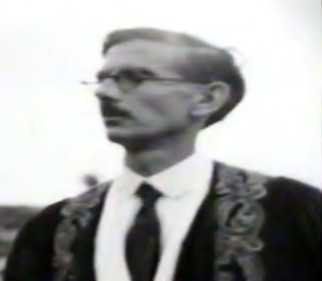
Ivor Jennings

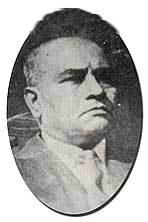
Nicholas Attygalle

== Academics ==
- V. Appapillai – Dean of the Faculty of Science
- S. Arasaratnam – lecturer of history
- K. S. Arulnandhy – lecturer in education
- Chandra de Silva
- K. M. de Silva – chair of Sri Lanka history
- Doric de Souza – senior lecturer in English
- Brendon Gooneratne – Head of the Department of Parasitology
- H. A. I. Goonetileke – assistant librarian
- Betty Heimann – first Head of the Department of Sanskrit
- K. Indrapala – Department of History
- Valentine Joseph – professor of mathematics.
- Stanley Kalpage – Head of the Department of Agricultural Chemistry
- P. Kanagasabapathy – professor of mathematics
- R. Kanagasuntheram – lecturer in anatomy
- K. Kanapathypillai – Head of the Department of Tamil
- K. Kunaratnam
- E. F. C. Ludowyk – Dean of the Faculty of Arts
- Baku Mahadeva – lecturer in mathematics
- Muhammad Ajward Macan Markar – professor of medicine
- A. W. Mailvaganam – Dean of the Faculty of Science
- T. Nadaraja – Dean of the Faculty of Law
- S. Pathmanathan – lecturer in history
- E. O. E. Pereira – Dean of the Faculty of Engineering
- Ediriweera Sarachchandra – lecturer in Pali
- S. Selvanayagam – assistant lecturer
- V. Sivalingam – professor of parasitology
- M. Sivasuriya – faculty of medicine
- Stanley Jeyaraja Tambiah
- A. Thurairajah – professor of civil engineering
- S. Vithiananthan – Head of the Department of Tamil
- A. Jeyaratnam Wilson – chair of political science

== Alumni ==
=== Academia ===
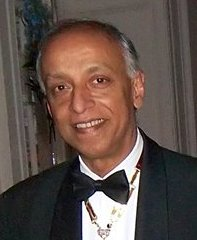
S. Arulkumaran

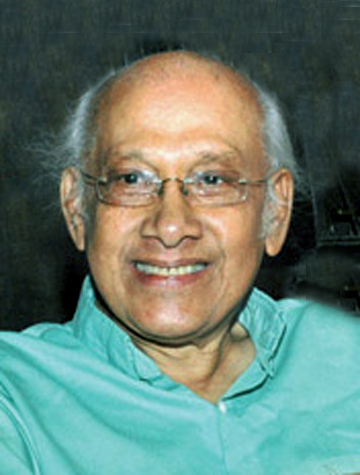
Sucharitha Gamlath

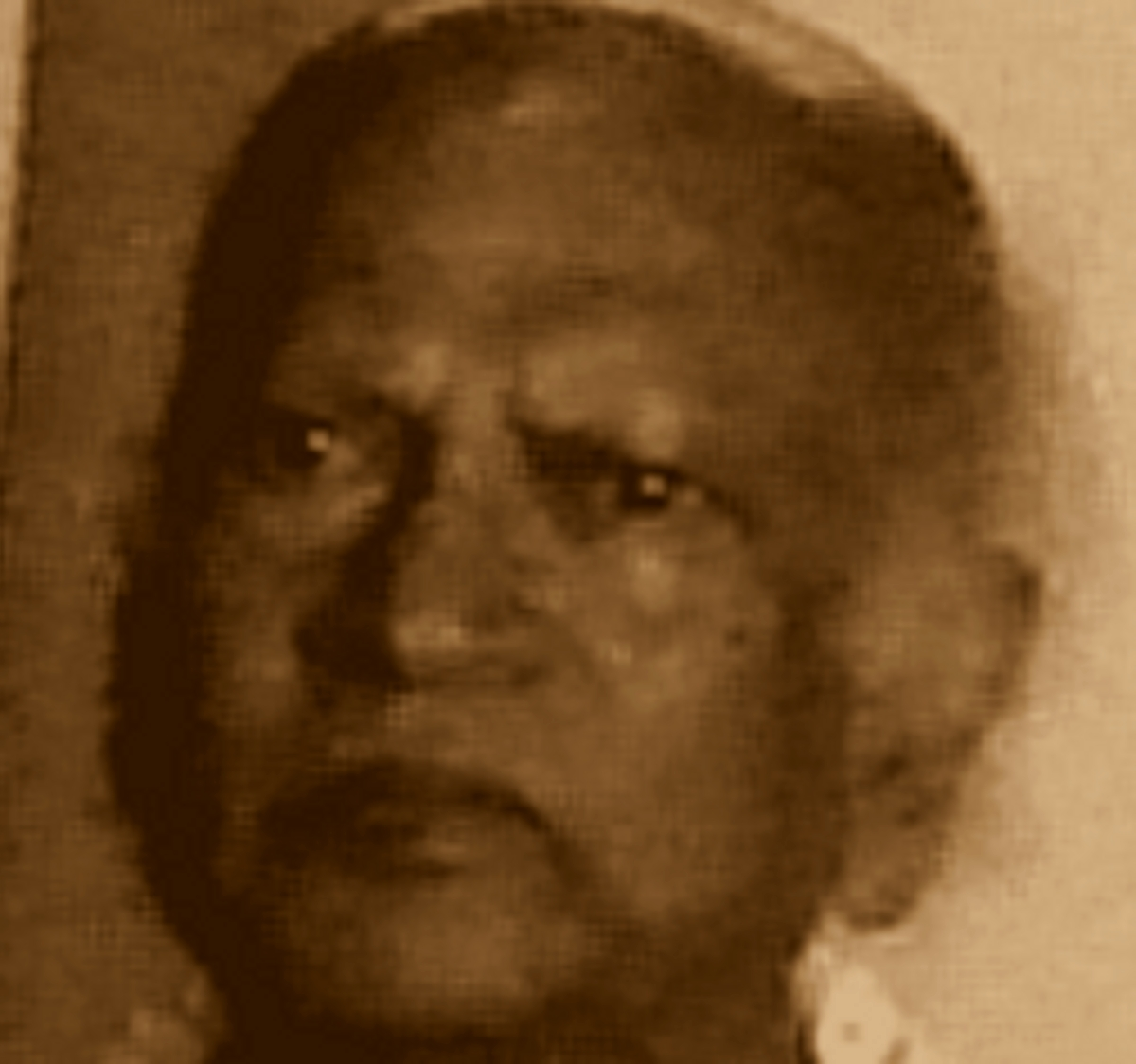
Siri Gunasinghe

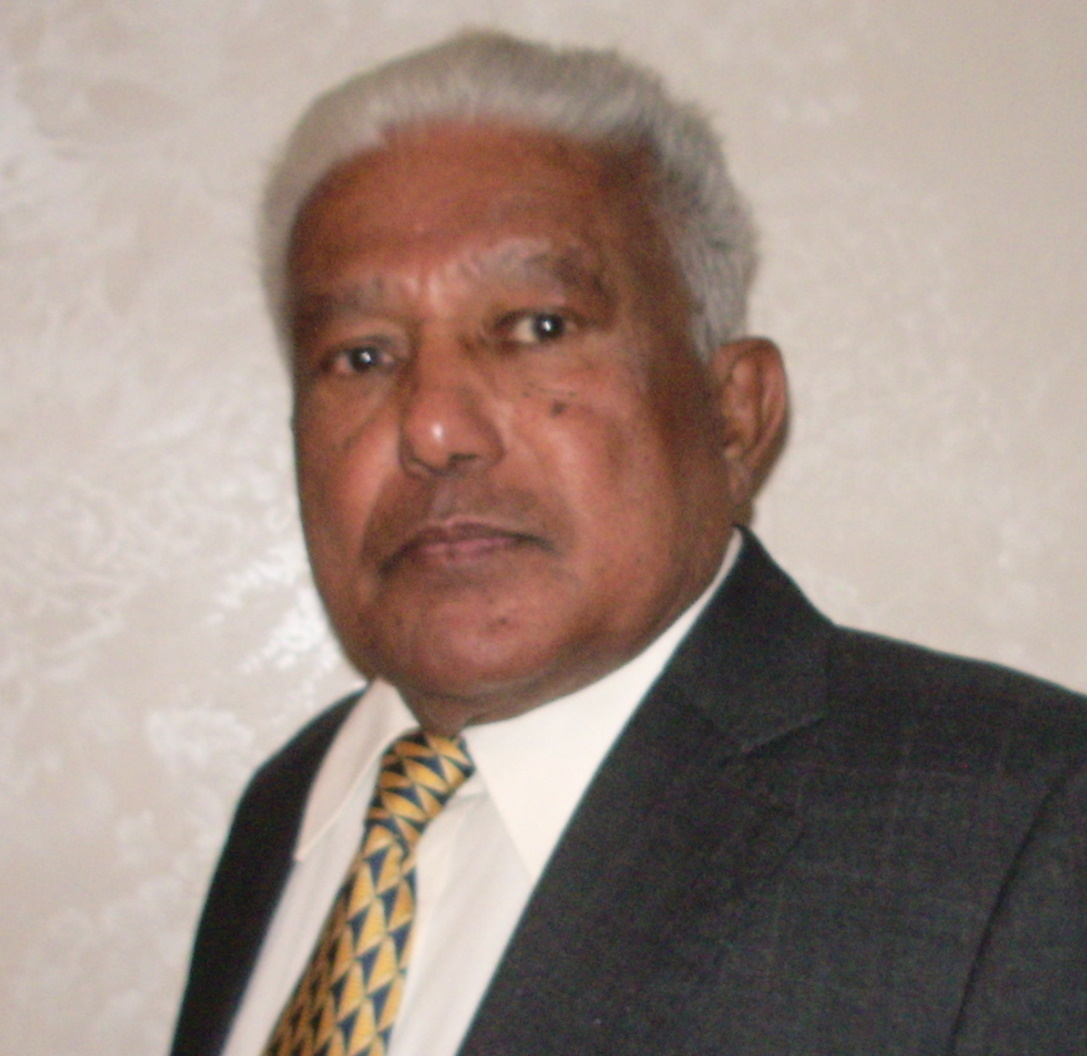
Y Karunadasa

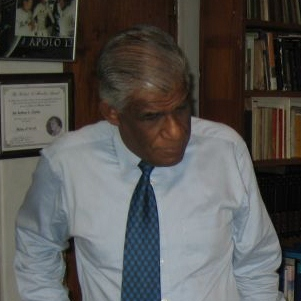
V. K. Samaranayake

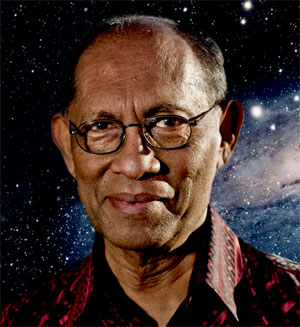
Chandra Wickramasinghe

- Ameer Ali – lecturer in economics
- Sarath Amunugama – professor of French; vice-chancellor of the University of Kelaniya
- S. Arulkumaran – professor of obstetrics and gynaecology
- S. Arasaratnam – professor of history
- K. Arulanandan – professor of engineering
- K. D. Arulpragasam – professor of zoology
- Ganesar Chanmugam – professor of astrophysics
- Charles Dahanayake – professor of physics, dean of Faculty of Science at the University of Kelaniya
- Chandra de Silva – lecturer in history, vice provost of the Old Dominion University
- K. M. de Silva – chair of Sri Lanka history at the University of Ceylon, Peradeniya
- Mohan De Silva – professor of surgery; dean of the Faculty of Medical Sciences at the University of Sri Jayewardenepura
- K. N. O. Dharmadasa – professor, dean of the Faculty of Arts at the University of Peradeniya
- George Dissanaike – professor of physics
- Elagu V. Elaguppillai – professor of physics
- Chitra Fernando – lecturer in linguistics, Macquarie University, Australia
- Brendon Gooneratne – senior lecturer, head of the Department of Parasitology at the University of Ceylon, Peradeniya
- Sucharitha Gamlath – professor of Sinhala, dean of the Faculty of Arts at the Jaffna Campus of the University of Sri Lanka
- R. K. W. Goonesekera – professor of law, chancellor of the University of Peradeniya
- Siri Gunasinghe – professor of history
- K. Indrapala – professor of history, dean of the Faculty of Arts at the University of Jaffna
- Osmund Jayaratne – professor of physics
- K. N. Jayatilleke – professor of Pali and Buddhist Studies, head of the Department of Philosophy at the University of Ceylon, Peradeniya
- W. L. Jeyasingham – associate professor of geography, dean of the Faculty of Arts at the University of Jaffna
- Valentine Joseph – professor of mathematics.
- Silan Kadirgamar – lecturer in history and author
- David Kalupahana – professor of philosophy
- P. Kanagasabapathy – professor of mathematics, dean of the Faculty of Science at the Jaffna Campus of the University of Sri Lanka
- R. Kanagasuntheram – professor of anatomy, dean of the Faculty of Medicine at the University of Jaffna
- Y Karunadasa – professor
- Kusuma Karunaratne – professor of Sinhala
- Sam Karunaratne – professor of engineering, vice-chancellor of the University of Moratuwa
- R. Kumaravadivel – professor of physics, dean of the Faculty of Science at the University of Jaffna
- K. Kunaratnam – professor of physics, vice-chancellor of the University of Jaffna
- Muhammad Ajward Macan Markar – professor of medicine
- M. Nadarajasundaram – professor, dean of the Faculty of Management Studies and Commerce at the University of Jaffna
- Gananath Obeyesekere – professor of anthropology
- S. Pathmanathan – professor of history, chancellor of the University of Jaffna
- Malik Peiris – professor
- V. K. Samaranayake – professor of computer science, dean of the Faculty of Science at the Colombo Campus of the University of Sri Lanka
- S. Selvanayagam – professor of geography, head of the Department of Geography at the University of Jaffna
- K. N. Seneviratne – professor of physiology
- M. Sivasuriya – professor of obstetrics and gynaecology; chancellor of the University of Jaffna
- K. Sivathamby – professor
- Muthucumaraswamy Sornarajah – professor of law, head of the School of Law at the University of Tasmania
- Stanley Jeyaraja Tambiah – professor of anthropology
- A. Thurairajah – professor of civil engineering, vice-chancellor of the University of Jaffna
- A. Veluppillai – professor of Tamil
- S. Vithiananthan – professor of Tamil; vice-chancellor of the University of Jaffna
- Chandra Wickramasinghe – professor of astrobiology; director of the Buckingham Centre for Astrobiology at the University of Buckingham
- Sunitha Wickramasinghe – professor of haematology
- Stanley Wijesundera – professor of chemistry; vice-chancellor of the University of Colombo
- Sumedha Chandana Wirasinghe – professor

=== Arts ===
- Gunadasa Amarasekara – author
- Nihal De Silva – novelist
- Vasantha Obeysekera – film director
- Iranganie Serasinghe – actress
- Ambalavaner Sivanandan – novelist

=== Business and finance ===
- Eastman Narangoda - Chairman of Seylan Bank
- J. M. Rajaratnam - Vice President of Singer Company

=== Civil service ===
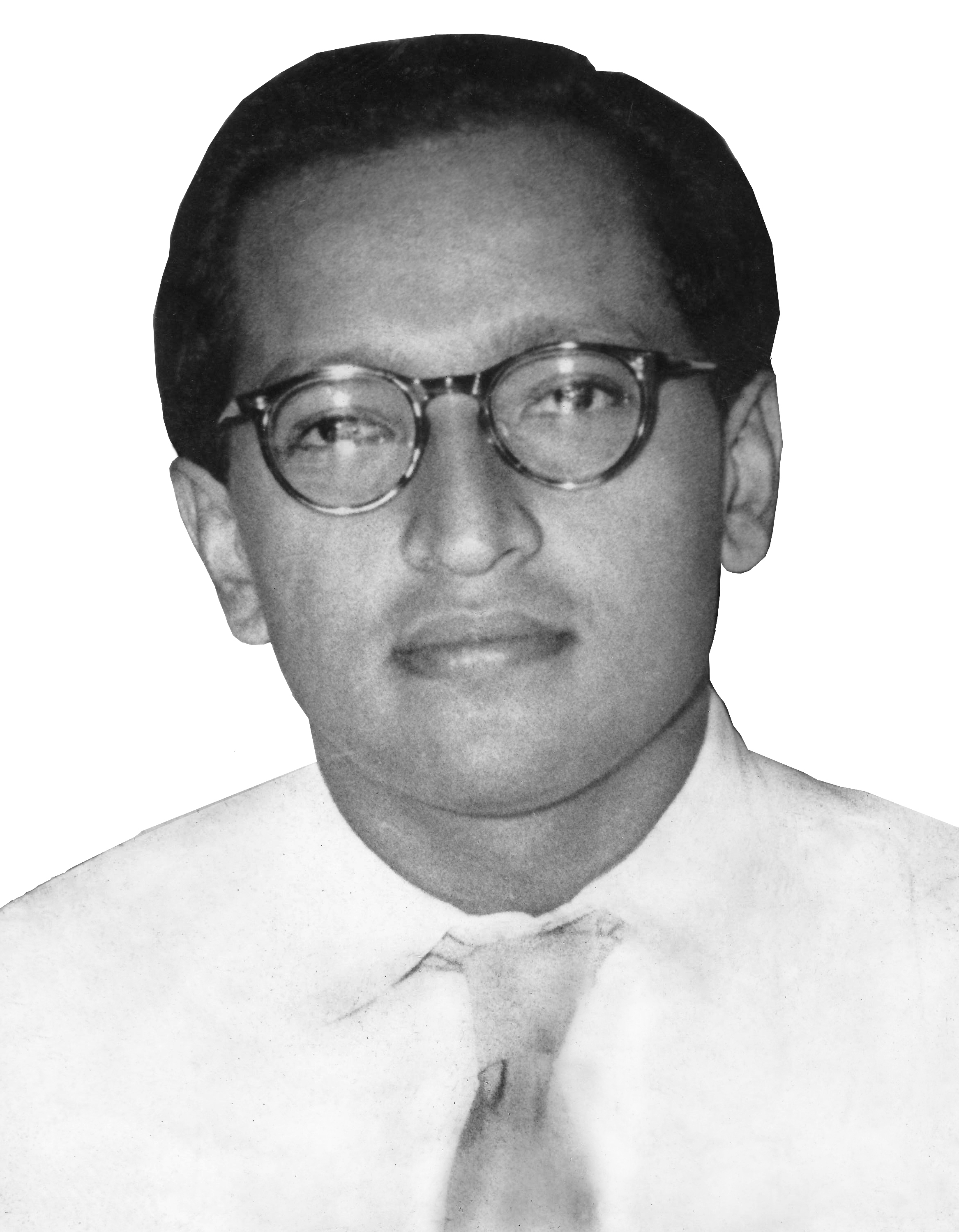
Jayantha Kelegama

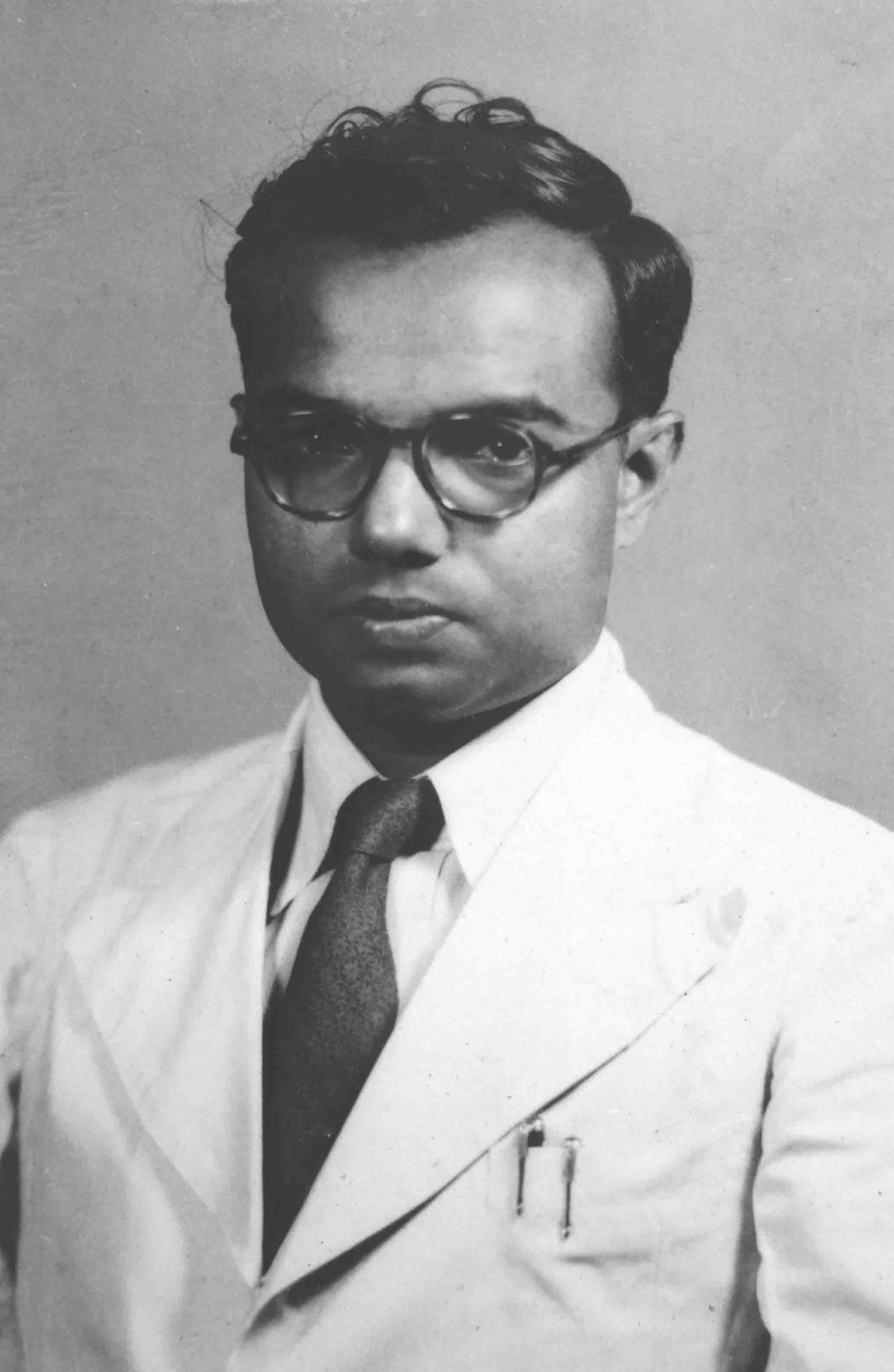
M. J. Perera

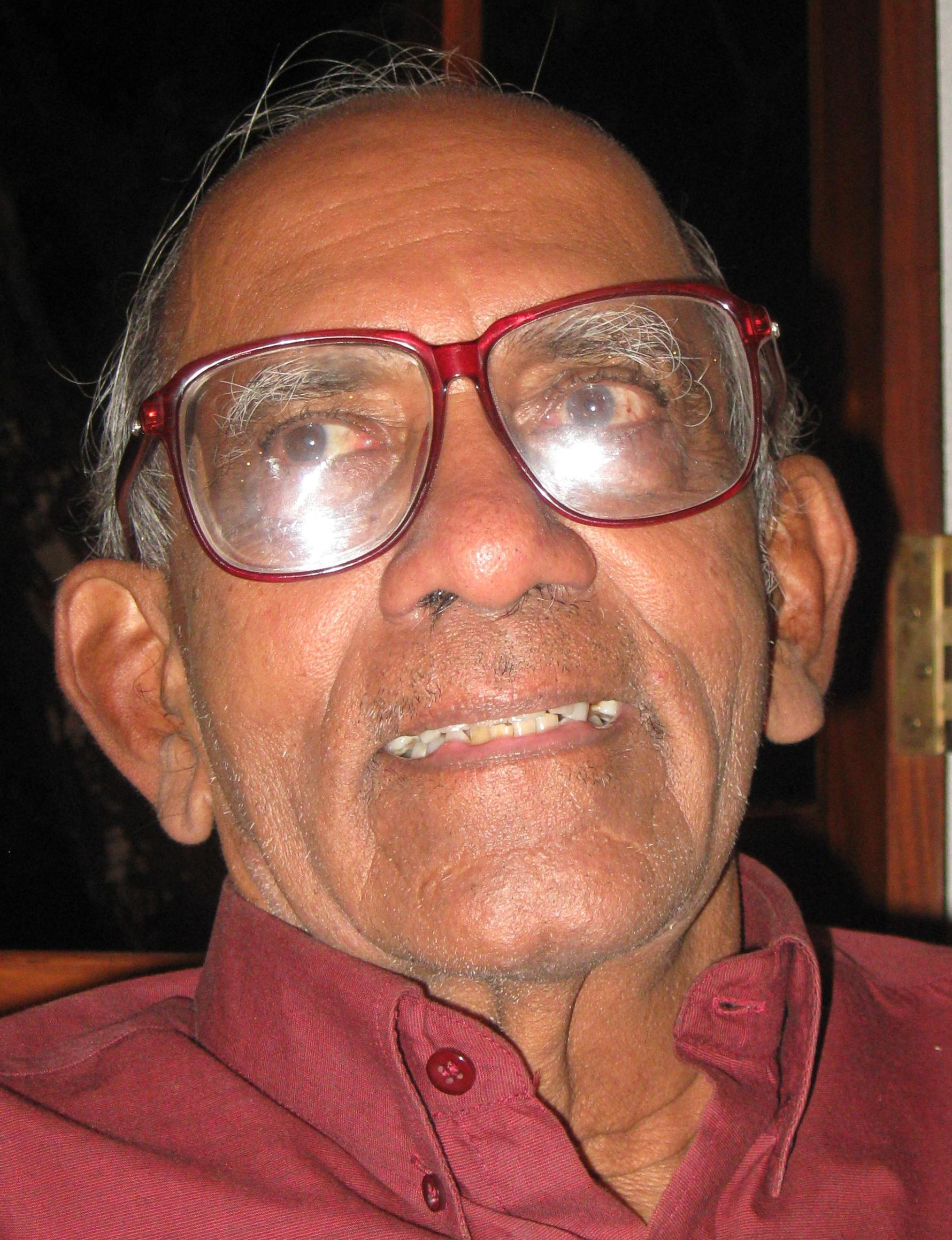
Nihal Seneviratne

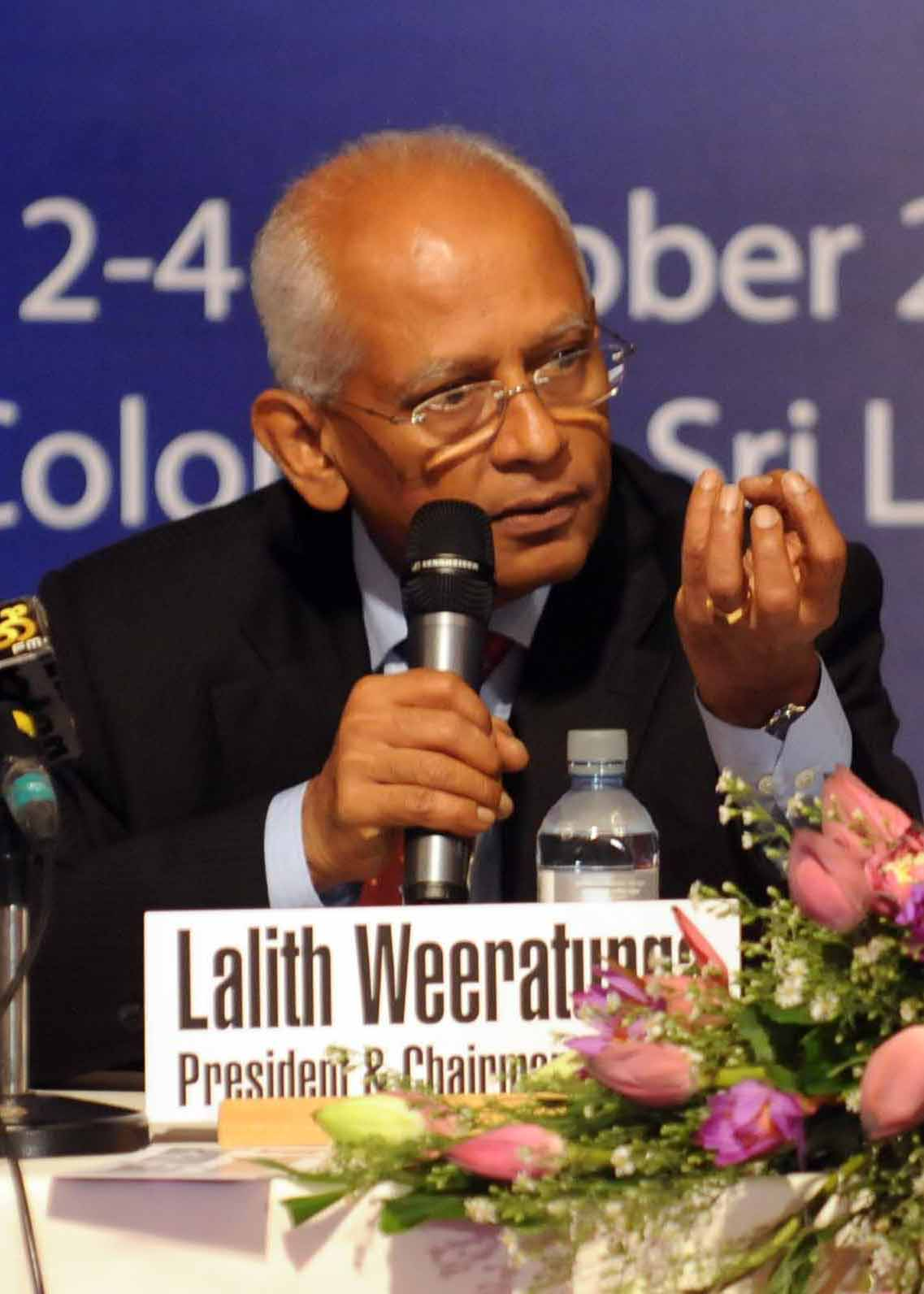
Lalith Weeratunga

- Austin Fernando - permanent secretary, Governor of Eastern Province
- Gamini Iriyagolla – civil servant
- Nihal Jayawickrama – permanent secretary at the Ministry of Justice
- Jayantha Kelegama – permanent secretary at the Ministry of External and Internal Trade
- K. C. Logeswaran – permanent secretary at the Ministry of Posts, Telecommunications and the Media, District Secretary for Vavuniya District, ambassador to South Korea
- H. M. G. S. Palihakkara - permanent secretary, ambassador, Governor of Northern Province
- V. M. Panchalingam – District Secretary for Jaffna District
- M. J. Perera – permanent secretary at the Ministry of Education and Cultural Affairs, chairman of the Sri Lanka Rupavahini Corporation
- Ranji Salgado – civil servant
- Nihal Seneviratne – Secretary General of Parliament
- Bernard Tilakaratna – permanent secretary at the Ministry of Foreign Affairs
- Lalith Weeratunga – permanent secretary to the President of Sri Lanka
- Wickrema Weerasooria – permanent secretary to the Ministry of Plan Implementation; high commissioner; associate professor of law
- Wilhelm Woutersz – permanent secretary at the Ministry of Foreign Affairs

=== Diplomacy ===
- Susantha De Alwis – ambassador
- John De Saram – diplomat
- Yogendra Duraiswamy – diplomat, District Secretary for Jaffna District
- Ahmed Aflal Jawad – ambassador
- Palitha Kohona – diplomat
- Vernon Mendis – ambassador
- A. T. Moorthy – diplomat

=== Government and politics ===
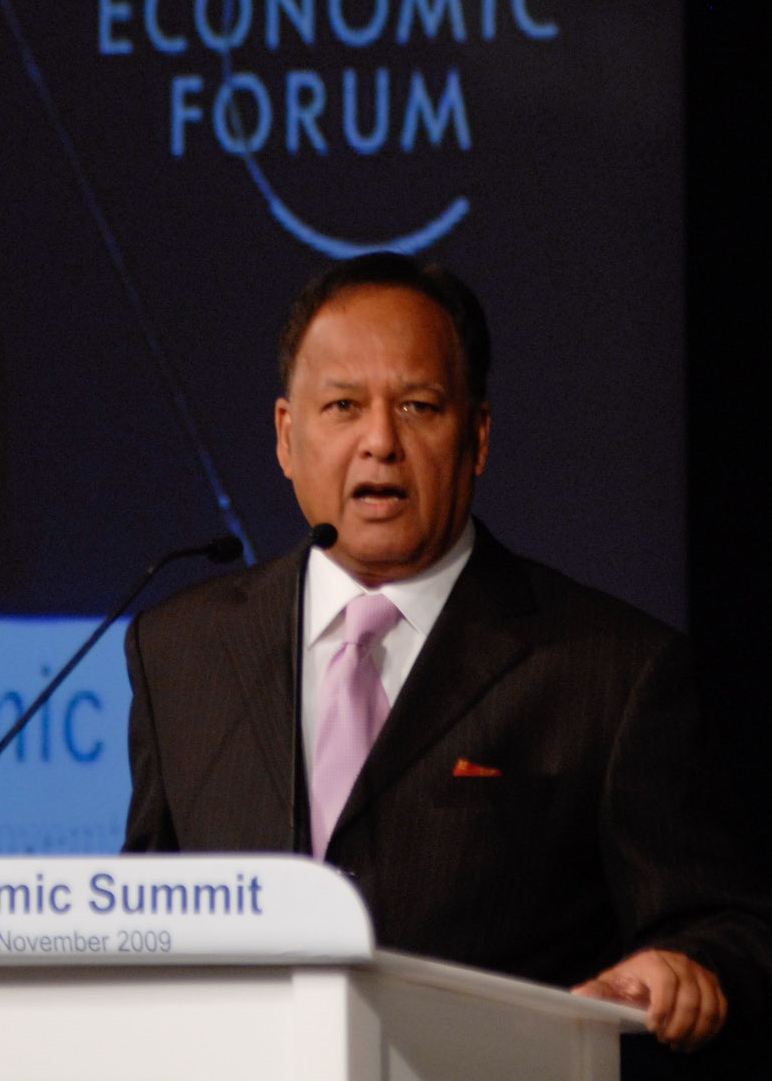
Sarath Amunugama

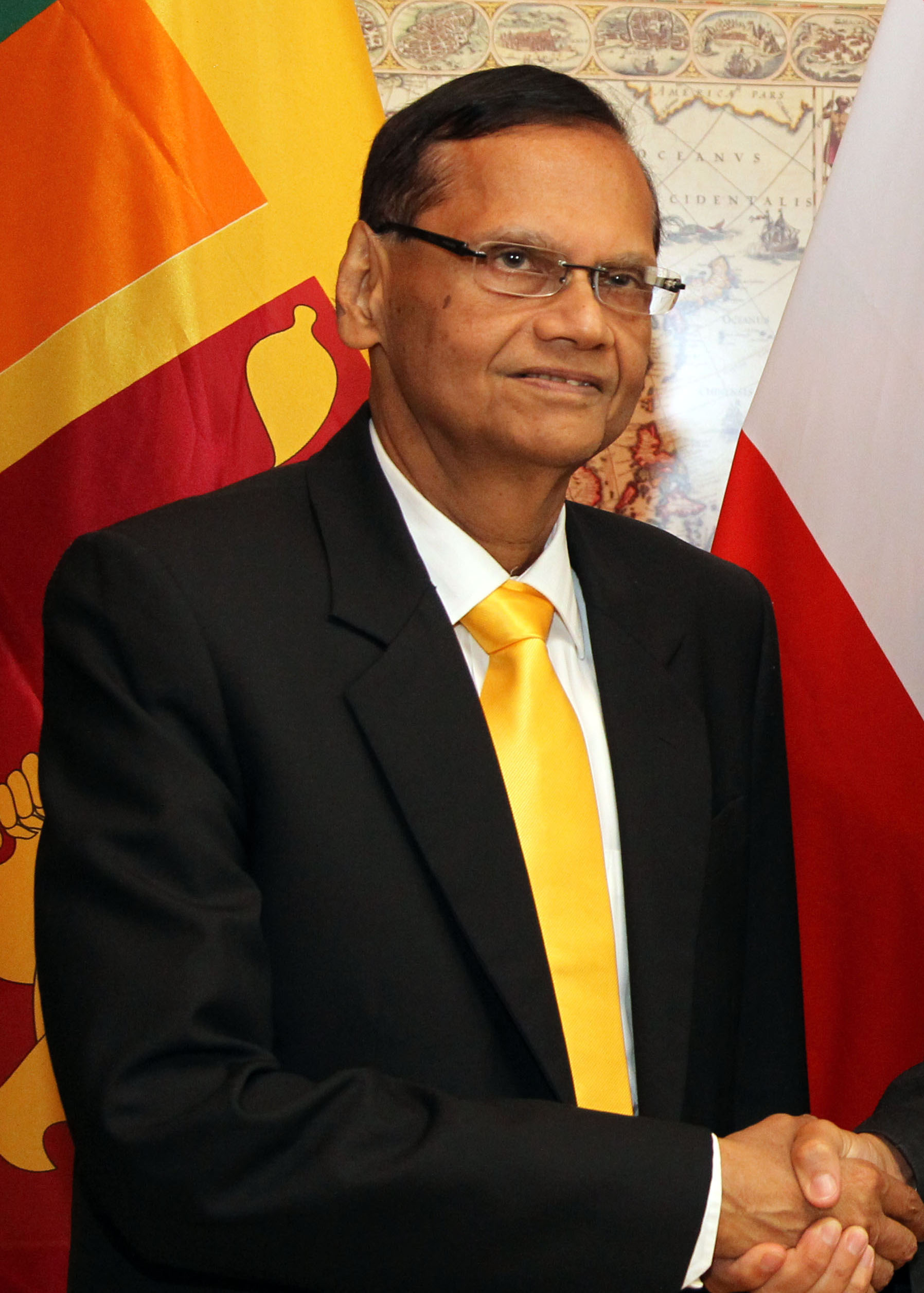
G. L. Peiris

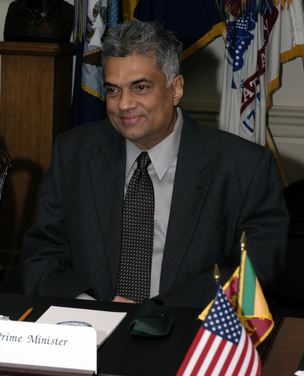
Ranil Wickremasinghe

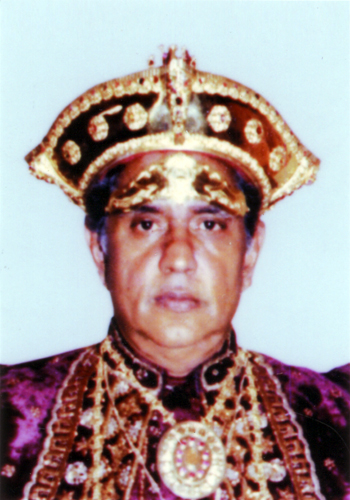
Nissanka Wijeyeratne

- Sarath Amunugama – government minister
- Felix Dias Bandaranaike – government minister
- Ronnie de Mel – government minister
- Amarasiri Dodangoda – government minister
- K. Ganeshalingam – Mayor of Colombo
- Lakshman Kadirgamar – Minister of Foreign Affairs
- Vikramabahu Karunaratne – politician
- M. A. Abdul Majeed – deputy minister
- G. L. Peiris – government minister
- K. Thurairatnam – Member of Parliament for Point Pedro
- Tissa Vitharana – government minister
- Ranil Wickremasinghe – Prime Minister
- Nissanka Wijeyeratne – government minister

=== Journalism and media ===
- Mervyn de Silva – editor of The Times of Ceylon, Ceylon Daily News and Lanka Guardian
- Vijita Fernando – journalist
- K. Kailasapathy – editor of Thinakaran, president of the Jaffna Campus of the University of Sri Lanka
- R. Sivagurunathan – editor of Thinakaran

=== Law ===
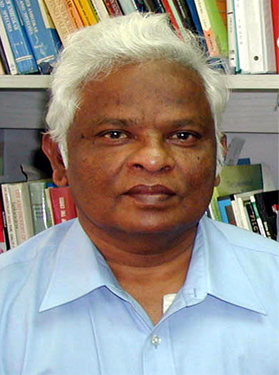
Basil Fernando

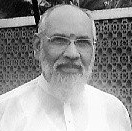
C. V. Vigneswaran

- Ranjit Abeysuriya – Director of Public Prosecutions
- John De Saram – Director of the Office of the Legal Counsel, United Nations Office of Legal Affairs
- H. L. de Silva – lawyer, ambassador
- Basil Fernando – lawyer
- Mark Fernando – Supreme Court judge
- Saleem Marsoof – Supreme Court judge
- Shiva Pasupati – Attorney General
- Satchi Ponnambalam – Puisne Justice of the Supreme Court of Belize
- H. D. Thambiah – Chief Justice
- Neelan Tiruchelvam – lawyer, academic and Member of Parliament for National List
- C. V. Vigneswaran – Supreme Court judge, chief minister of the Northern Province
- Upawansa Yapa – Solicitor General

=== Medicine ===
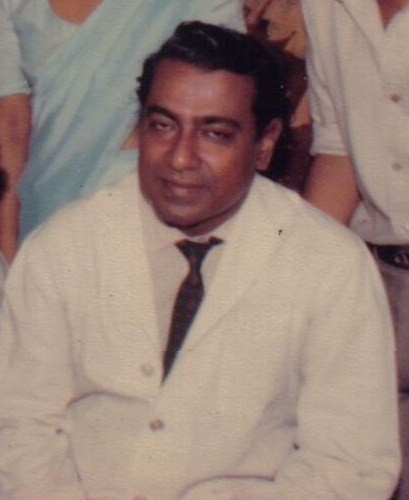
Surendra Ramachandran

- Surendra Ramachandran – consultant physician, nephrologist

=== Military ===
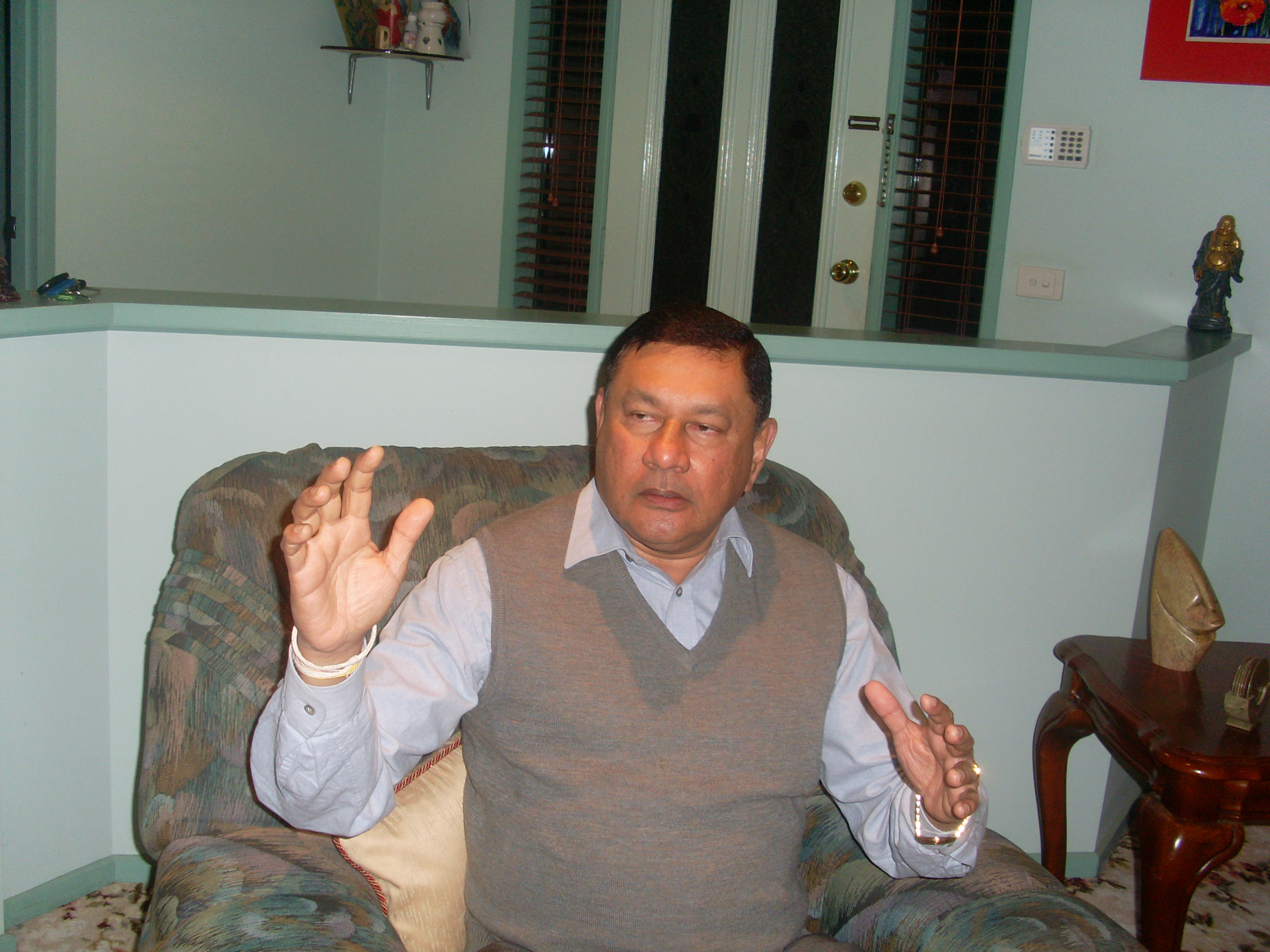
Janaka Perera

- Sepala Attygalle – Commander of the Army
- Janaka Perera – Chief of Staff of the Sri Lanka Army
- Chelliah Thurairaja – Colonel Commandant of the Sri Lanka Army Medical Corps

=== Religion ===
- Bastiampillai Deogupillai – Roman Catholic Bishop of Jaffna
- S. J. Emmanuel – Roman Catholic Vicar General of the Jaffna Diocese, president of the Global Tamil Forum
- S. Jebanesan – Church of South India Bishop of Jaffna
- Lakshman Wickremasinghe – Anglican Bishop of Kurunegala

=== Sports ===
- Hemasiri Fernando – rifle shooter, vice president of the Commonwealth Games Federation
- P. H. D. Waidyatilleka – Vice President of the Athletic Association of Sri Lanka

=== Other ===
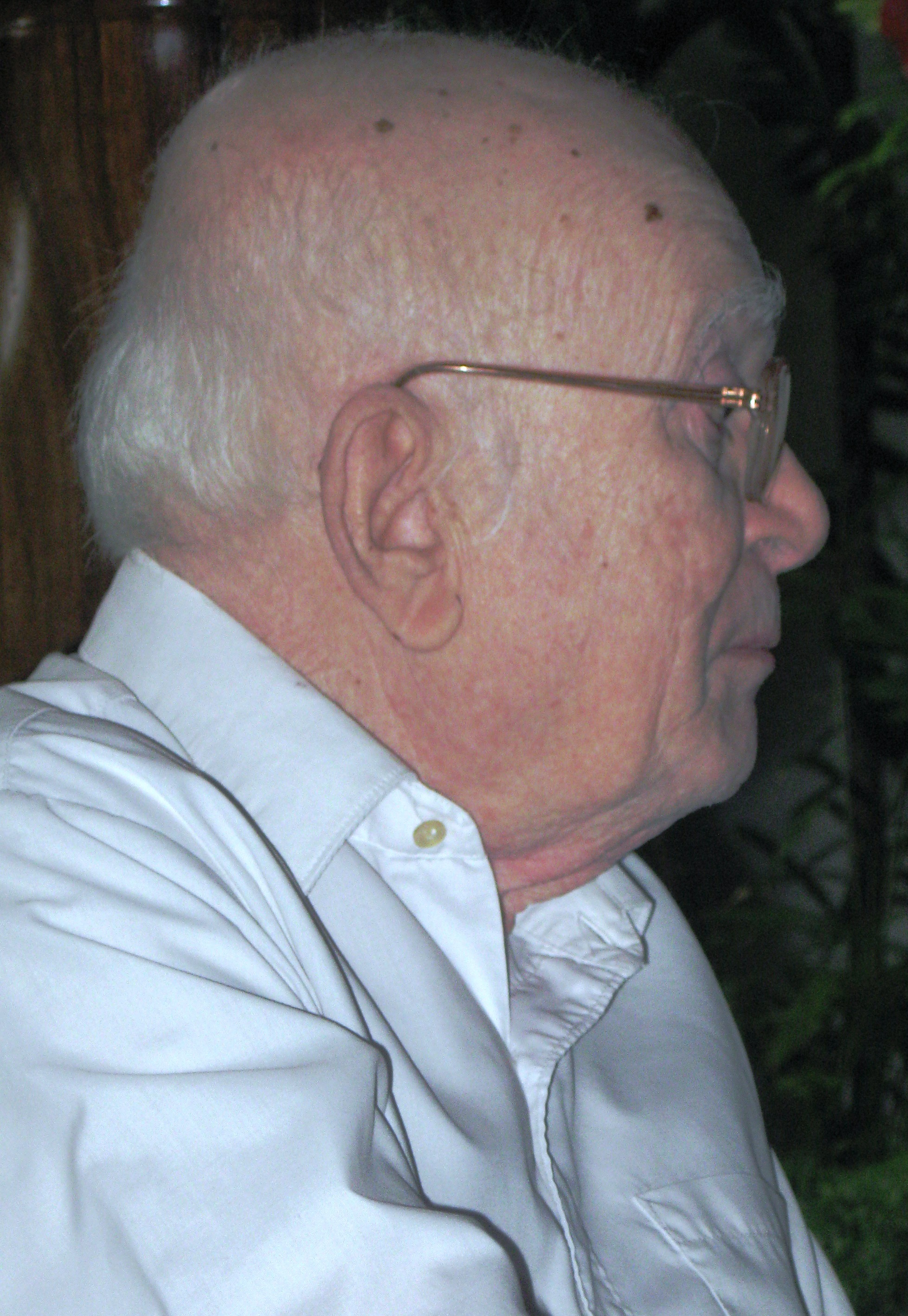
Ana Seneviratne

- Gamani Corea – Secretary-General of the United Nations Conference on Trade and Development
- Cyril Herath – Inspector General of Police
- Rajan Hoole – human rights activist and lecturer in mathematics
- Nandasiri Jasentuliyana – Director of the United Nations Office for Outer Space Affairs
- A. M. Mubarak – Director of the National Science Foundation
- Rudra Rajasingham – Inspector General of Police
- Ana Seneviratne – Inspector General of Police
- T. Somasekaram – Surveyor General
- Kanagaratnam Sriskandan – civil engineer
- Bala Tampoe – general secretary of the Ceylon Mercantile Union
- P. H. D. Waidyatilleka – civil engineer; senior vice president of the Athletic Association of Sri Lanka
