= List of University of Colombo people =

The following people spent time at the University of Colombo as either teaching staff or students.

== Heads of state and government ==
- J. R. Jayewardene – former President and Prime Minister of Sri Lanka
- Gotabaya Rajapaksa – former President of Sri Lanka
- Ranil Wickremesinghe – former President and Prime Minister of Sri Lanka

== Prominent figures in the independence movement ==
- Dr Charles Alwis Hewavitharana, FRCS – leader in the independence movement

== Legislators and political figures ==
- Hector Abhayavardhana – Trotskyist
- Professor Ranjith Bandara, Member of Parliament in Sri Lanka
- A. Amirthalingam – former Opposition leader, Member of Parliament and Tamil separatist
- Hon. Tissa Attanayake – former Cabinet Minister; former Member of Parliament
- Professor Sir Nicholas Attygalle, FRCS – former President of the Senate of Ceylon, Vice-Chancellor of University of Ceylon, Dean Faculty of Medicine & Professor of Obstetrics and Gynaecology
- Hon. Ronnie De Mel, CCS – former Cabinet Minister and Member of Parliament
- Hon. William de Silva – former Cabinet Minister and Member of Parliament
- Deshamanya Neville Kanakeratne – former Governor of the Southern Province
- Hon. Anil Moonesinghe – former Cabinet Minister and Member of Parliament
- Senator Somasundaram Nadesan – former Senator
- Hon. Professor G. L. Peiris – former Cabinet Minister and Member of Parliament
- Hon. M. Sivasithamparam – former Deputy Speaker of Parliament
- Hon. Doctor Tissa Vitharana – current Cabinet Minister of Science and Technology and Member of Parliament
- Hon. Doctor Nissanka Wijeyeratne, CCS – former Cabinet Minister of Education, Higher Education and Justice; Member of Parliament; Sri Lankan Ambassador to the Russian Federation; former Permanent Secretary; Diyawadana Nilame of the Temple of the Tooth

== Clergy and religious figures ==
- Cardinal Thomas Cooray, OMI – former Archbishop of Colombo; first Cardinal from Sri Lanka
- Rt.Revd. Dr. Lakshman Wickremasinghe – Bishop of Kurunegala; youngest bishop in the Church of England

== Civil servants ==
- Hamilton Shirley Amerasinghe, CCS – former Permanent Secretary of the Ministry of Finance & Treasury, Ministry of Health (also listed in Diplomats)
- Deshamanya C.A. Coorey, SLAS – former Permanent Secretary of the Ministry of Finance & Treasury
- Deshamanya Dr Gamani Corea – former Secretary-General of the UNCTD (1974–1984); Permanent Secretary of the Ministry of Planning and Economic Affairs; Senior Deputy Governor of the Central Bank of Ceylon
- Tissa Devendra – former Chairman of Public Service Commission; Chairman of Salaries Commission; first President of the Colombo University Alumni Association
- Hemasiri Fernando – former Secretary to the Prime Minister
- Bernard Peiris, OBE, JP – former Cabinet Secretary
- M. J. Perera, CCS – first Chairman of the Rupavahini Corporation; former Permanent Secretary of the Education and Cultural Affairs Ministry; Vice-Chancellor of University of Peradeniya
- G.V.P. Samarasinghe, CCS – former Cabinet Secretary and Permanent Secretary of Defence and Foreign Affairs
- S.J. Walpita, CCS – former Permanent Secretary to the Ministry of Industries & Fisheries; Vice-Chancellor of University of Ceylon, Peradeniya
- Bradman Weerakoon, CCS – former Secretary to the Prime Minister

== Diplomats ==
- T. D. S. A. Dissanayake – former Sri Lankan Ambassador to Indonesia and Egypt
- Yogendra Duraiswamy, SLOS – former Sri Lankan diplomat
- Deshamanya Dr Vernon Mendis, SLOS – former United Nations' Special Envoy to the Middle East, Sri Lankan High Commissioner to the United Kingdom, Canada; Ambassador to USSR, Cuba and Secretary General of the Non Aligned Movement
- Daya Perera, PC – former Sri Lankan High Commissioner to Canada; Ambassador to the United Nations in New York
- Wickrema Weerasooria – former Sri Lankan High Commissioner to Australia and New Zealand; Permanent Secretary to the Ministry of Plan Implementation

== Military ==
- General Deshamanya Sepala Attygalle, MVO, idc, psc, SLAC – former Commander of the Sri Lankan Army (1967–1977) and Permanent Secretary to the Ministry of Defence
- Major General Anton Muttukumaru – first Ceylonese Army officer to serve as Commander of the Ceylon Army
- Major General Dr. Chelliah Thurairaja, USP, SLMC – former Director Army Medical Services and Colonel Commandant of the Sri Lanka Army Medical Corps

== Police ==
- Sydney de Zoysa – former Deputy Inspector General of Police, Range II; Permanent Secretary to the Ministry of Internal Security; a leader of the attempted military coup in 1962
- C. C. Dissanayake – former Senior Deputy Inspector General of Police (SDIG) and a leader of the attempted military coup in 1962
- S.A. Dissanayake – former Inspector General of Police (IGP) and Additional Permanent Secretary of the Ministry of External Affairs and Defence
- N. K. Illangakoon – current Inspector General of Police (IGP)

== Academics ==
=== Vice Chancellors ===
- Professor Savitri Goonesekere – former Vice Chancellor of the University of Colombo
- Professor Kshanika Hirimburegama – current Vice Chancellor of the University of Colombo
- Professor Vidya Jyothi V. K. Samaranayake – former Dean of the Faculty of Science, University of Colombo and founder of University of Colombo School of Computing
- Professor Stanley Wijesundera – former Vice Chancellor of the University of Colombo

=== Professors and scholars ===
- Professor Hithanadura Janaka De Silva – Foundation Professor of Medicine, University of Kelaniya; Dean of Faculty of Medicine Kelaniya (Student Faculty of Medicine 1977-1982)
- Professor Nalin de Silva – professor in the Department of Mathematics at the University of Kelaniya
- Professor Rangita de Silva de Alwis – adjunct professor of Global Leadership at the University of Pennsylvania Law School
- Dr Nirmal Ranjith Dewasiri – historian and Head of the Department of History, University of Colombo
- Professor Deshamanya J B Disanayake – professor and former Head of the Department of Sinhala, University of Colombo
- Professor Devaka Fernando – Foundation Professor of Medicine, University of Sri Jayawardanapura; Visiting Professor of Endocrinology University of Newcastle upon Tyne, University of Sheffield; Honorary Professor Sheffield Hallam University (Student Faculty of Medicine 1976-1981 and Senior Lecturer in Medicine 1994-1996)
- Dr. Brendon Gooneratne – Head and Senior Lecturer, Department of Parasitology, University of Ceylon, Peradeniya
- Professor Yasmine Gooneratne – poet, short story writer and essayist
- Priyanga Ranasinghe – professor in Pharmacology at the Faculty of Medicine, University of Colombo.
- Professor Shan Ratnam – Head of the Department of Obstetrics and Gynaecology, National University Hospital of Singapore
- Professor A. Suri Ratnapala – Professor of Law, T.C. Beirne School of Law, University of Queensland
- Professor Ediriweera Sarachchandra – playwright, novelist and poet
- Professor K. N. Seneviratne – Professor of Medicine; founder director of Sri Lanka's Postgraduate Institute of Medicine
- Professor Jayadeva Uyangoda – professor and former Head of the Department of Political Science, University of Colombo
- Dr Maitree Wickramasinghe – academic and senior lecturer at the Department of English of the University of Kelaniya
- Professor Nira Wickramasinghe – historian and Professor of Modern South Asian Studies at Leiden University in the Netherlands
- Dr Gihan Wikramanayake – Head and Senior Lecturer, Department of Information Systems Engineering of the University of Colombo School of Computing
- Dr Ruchira Wijesena - Senior Lecturer at the Institute of Technology, University of Moratuwa

== Artists ==
=== Novelists, poets and playwrights ===
- Professor Ediriweera Sarachchandra – Sri Lanka's premier playwright

=== Actors ===
- Jackson Anthony – actor, director, singer
- Iranganie Serasinghe – actress

=== Visual artists ===
- Malaka Dewapriya – filmmaker, short film director, video artist, radio play writer

== Judges ==
- Hon. Justice Saleem Marsoof – former Judge of the Supreme Court
- Hon. Justice Neville Samarakoon – former Chief Justice of Sri Lanka
- Sri Lankabhimanya Hon. Justice Christopher Weeramantry – former Judge of the International Court of Justice and the Supreme Court of Sri Lanka

== Medicine ==
- Hithanadura Janaka De Silva – Foundation Professor of Medicine University of Kelaniya, Dean Faculty of Medicine Kelaniya
- Devaka Fernando – Foundation Professor of Medicine University of Sri Jayawardanapura; Visiting Professor of Endocrinology, University of Newcastle upon Tyne, University of Sheffield; Honorary Professor, Sheffield Hallam University
- Brendon Gooneratne – scholar and author
- Charles Alwis Hewavitharana – independence activist
- Richard Lionel Spittel, CMG, CBE – naturalist and author

== Journalists ==
- Sulochana Peiris - journalist and documentary film maker
- Eva Ranaweera – feminist editor, poet and novelist
- Regi Siriwardena – journalist and writer

== Sportsmen ==
- Brigadier Dr. H.I.K. Fernando – former Ceylon cricketer
- Lasantha Fernando – tennis champion and Davis Cup player
- Jehan Mubarak – cricketer
- Tambyah Murugaser – former Vice President of the Board of Control for Cricket; Sri Lanka team manager
- Dr Ajith C. S. Perera – former test-match-panel senior cricket umpire; disability activist
- Mano Ponniah – former Ceylon cricketer and member of the Cambridge eleven
- Kumar Sangakkara – captain of the Sri Lankan national cricket team

== Lawyers ==
- T.B. Dissanayake – former Commissioner of Assize
- Palitha Fernando, PC – current Attorney General of Sri Lanka and Judge Advocate of the Sri Lanka Navy

== Engineers ==
- B. D. Rampala – former chief mechanical engineer and general manager of the Ceylon Government Railway

== Activists ==
- Rajini Thiranagama – human rights activist and feminist

== Faculty ==
- Professor Sir Nicholas Attygalle
- Professor Sir Charles Irwin Ball
- Professor Nalin de Silva
- Dr Nirmal Ranjith Dewasiri
- Professor Deshamanya J B Disanayake
- Professor J B Disanayake
- Professor Christie Jayaratnam Eliezer, AM
- Professor Savitri Goonesekere
- Professor Kshanika Hirimburegama
- Professor Kumari Jayawardena
- Professor Amal Jayawardane
- Professor Sir William Ivor Jennings
- Professor Kusuma Karunaratne
- Professor Sarath Kotagama
- Professor S.R. Kottegoda
- Professor Gunapala Piyasena Malalasekera
- Professor Dharmasena Pathiraja
- Professor G. L. Peiris
- Professor Vidya Jyothi V. K. Samaranayake
- Professor Ediriweera Sarachchandra
- Professor Anuradha Seneviratna
- Professor K. N. Seneviratne
- Professor Priyani Soysa
- Hedi Stadlen
- Professor Deepika Udagama
- Professor Jayadeva Uyangoda
- Professor Nira Wickramasinghe
- Professor Stanley Wijesundera
