= Piyasiri =

Piyasiri is both a given name and a surname. Notable people with the name include:

- H. R. Piyasiri (fl. 1989–2009), Sri Lankan politician
- Piyasiri Wijenayake (fl. 2004–2010), Sri Lankan politician
- Saman Piyasiri Fernando (1958–1989), Sri Lankan politician
