= H. R. Amaraweera =

Director Operations Sri Lanka Navy

Rear Admiral H.R. Amaraweera WV, RWP, RSP, VSV, USP
- Military career
- Allegiance: Sri Lanka
- Branch: Sri Lanka Navy
- Rank: Rear Admiral
- Commands: Senior Naval Officer Northern Naval Area, Director Naval Operations, Commander Northern Naval Area, Commander Western Naval Area, Commander Southern Naval Area. Competent Authority- Port Authority Sri Lanka -( 1988/89) Founding father & the chief architect of Sri Lanka Navy Special Boat Squadron (SBS). Sri Lanka Navy
- Conflicts: Sri Lankan Civil War
- Awards: Weerodara Vibhushanaya(WV) Uttama Seva Padakkama, Vishista Seva Vibhushanaya, Ranasura Padakkama, Rana Wickrama Padakkama, Desha Putra Sammanaya.
- Other work: Coordinating Director for Trincomalee of the Ministry of Resettlement and Disaster Relief

Rear Admiral Handunnetti Rannulu Amaraweera, WV, RWP, RSP, VSV, USP, DSP, RCDS (UK), Psc (USA). is a former Director Operations Sri Lanka Navy.

== Early life ==
Amaraweera was educated at Nalanda College, Colombo. He was a keen cricketer and played for the Nalanda first XI team. Some of his teammates were Lalith Kaluperuma and Eastman Narangoda. Amaraweera's brothers former Minister H. R. Piyasiri and former Member of parliament H. R. Wimalasiri too played cricket for Nalanda.

== Military career ==
After completing education at Nalanda, Amaraweera joined Sri Lanka Navy in 1969 as a Cadet Officer intake one at NMA and later graduated from Naval Military Academy (NMA)- Trincomalle Sri Lanka was commissioned as a Sub Lieutenant. Staff College Course at US Naval War College, Newport RI, United States and Royal College of Defence Studies United Kingdom. During his Naval career, Amaraweera had held some key appointments such as Senior Officer Northern Naval Area, Commander Northern Naval Area, Commander Western Naval Area, Commander of the Southern Naval, Director Naval Operations, Director Naval Personal & Training. area, commander of the Western Naval area. Founding father & the chief architect of Sri Lanka Navy Special Boat squadron. After retirement at present, Rear Admiral H.R. Amaraweera is the managing director of Sri Lanka Land Reclamation and Development Corporation (LRDC) Security Services.

2001 - Rear Admiral HR Amaraweera was named Senior Naval Officer Commanding Northern Naval Area when Jaffna peninsula came under heavy LTTE resistance and in the verge of complete withdrawal of Sri Lanka armed forces. After ceasing operations at the Palali Air force base the Air Force assets were moved to Kareinagar Naval Base under the Command of Rear Admiral HR Amaraweera. The KKS was the only life line for the Sri Lankan Force. Due to Rear Admiral HR Amaraweera's leadership and timely actions averted a total withdrawal of Sri Lankan Armed Forces from the Jaffna peninsula despite government of Sri Lanka and top brass in Colombo insisting on sending merchant vessels to KKS harbor.

Operation Rivirasa 1995 - 1996. Commodore H.R Amaraweera as Commander Northern Naval Area was responsible for maintaining uninterrupted logistical supply route (Northern Seas) midst heavy enemy resistance.

Operation Balavegaya 1991 : Operation Balavegaya was a combined military operation launched by the Sri Lankan military in Jaffna, the largest amphibious assault in its history. Operation Balavegaya was launched in response to the siege of Elephant Pass by the LTTE. Capt. H.R. Amaraweera, who commanded the flotilla of the landing force which landed troops under stiff resistance with the fire power of Naval Gun boats and Fast Attack Crafts.

== General references ==
- HSZ in Muttur east to be reduced - Trinco hospital staff concerned over security
- Opposition accuse of military interference
- Rajapaksa Plans To Rig Polls with Help of Armymen: Opposition
- Gotabhaya to receive report that clears military
- Retired officers condemn CM's behaviour
