= St. Luke's College, Ratnapura =

School in Sri Lanka

Luke's College (Sinhala: ශාන්ත ලූක් විද්‍යාලය, රත්නපුර) is one of the oldest schools in Sri Lanka. it is located on the Colombo - Batticaloa highway (A4), in Ratnapura, Sabaragamuwa Province, Sri Lanka.

== History ==
St. Luke's College is one of the oldest schools in Sri Lanka. It was established in 1848 (178 years ago) adjacent to St. Luke's Church.

== College Motto ==
"Vincit veritas", which means "truth conquers" in Latin.

== Notable alumni ==
- Sir Nicholas Attygalle (1894-1970) academic and politician.
- Namel Weeramuni, actor, director and playwright
