= H. R. Wimalasiri =

Sri Lankan politician (born 1953)

Hon. H. R. Wimalasiri

MP

Member of Parliament for Matara
- In office 1994–2000

Personal details
- Born: 29 September 1953 (age 73) Matara, Sri Lanka
- Party: United National Party
- Relations: H. R. Piyasiri; H.R. Amaraweera
- Education: Nalanda College Colombo
- Occupation: Politics

Handunnetti Rannulu Wimalasiri (known as H. R. Wimalasiri) was a member of the Parliament of Sri Lanka.

In 1994 he was elected for the seat of Devinuwara of Matara, Southern Province, Sri Lanka under United National Party. Currently, he is the Devinuwara United National Party (UNP) Chief Organiser.

Wimalasiri was educated at Nalanda College Colombo and was a member of the Nalanda College First XI cricket team playing for the 42nd Battle of the Maroons in 1971. This Nalanda team was captained by Bandula Warnapura and Sunil Jayasinghe and Jayantha Seneviratne were also members of it.

Wimalasiri's father was Muhandiram H. R. Amaradasa, the managing director of the Ruhunu Transit, one of the largest bus companies in the region that ran bus operations based in Matara covering most of the Southern Province.
