= E. O. E. Pereira =

Vidya Jyothi E.O.E. Pereira BSc (Lond), BA (Cantab)

Vice Chancellor of the University of Ceylon
- In office 1969–1971

Personal details
- Born: 13 September 1907 Colombo, Ceylon
- Died: 1988 (aged 80–81) Colombo, Sri Lanka
- Education: Downing College, Cambridge; University College Colombo; Royal College Colombo
- Profession: Engineer, Academic

Vidya Jyothi E. O. Eustace Pereira (13 September 1907 – 1988) was a Sri Lankan Engineer and Academic. He was the Vice Chancellor of the University of Ceylon, where he founded the Faculty of Engineering. He was known as the Father of modern engineering education in Sri Lanka.

== Early life and education ==
Pereira was born on 13 September 1907 to George Eustace Pereira, a station master of the Ceylon Government Railway. Pereira received his education at the Royal College, Colombo, where he excelled in both academics and sports. He won the De Soysa Science Prize, the Mohamed Ali Arithmetic Prize, Evams Prize for Mathematics (shared with Danton G. Obyesekere), and he won house colours for cricket. J.R. Jayawardene, the future President of Sri Lanka, and Ceylon cricketer N.S. Joseph were his classmates at Royal College.

In 1928, he entered the University College Colombo and graduated with a first class honours degree from the University of London, gaining first place in the faculty of Science and winning the engineering scholarship. The scholarship enabled him to enter Downing College, Cambridge, where he gained the distinction of being the only graduate to finish the 3 year degree in two years. His contemporaries at Cambridge included Dudley Senanayake, the further Prime Minister of Ceylon. From the University of Cambridge, he graduated with first class honours in Mechanical Sciences Tripos in 1931.

== Career ==
Pereira served in the Department of Public Works for 15 years before joining the teaching staff of the University of Ceylon in 1946. He was its first Professor of Civil Engineering and the founding Dean of the Engineering Faculty, University of Ceylon, at its inception in 1950. In 1969, he was appointed Vice Chancellor of the University of Ceylon in Peradeniya.

He was chairman of the National Science Council and member of several other government boards and commissions, including the Official Languages Commission and the Loan Commission.

== Honors ==
Prof. Pereira was honoured with the title Vidya Jyothi in 1986. He died in 1988. The EOE Pereira Theatre of the Faculty of Engineering University of Peradeniya was named to honor him, and several awards are made each year in his name: the annual E.O.E. Pereira Memorial Prize is awarded for the Best Paper by the Institute of Engineers Sri Lanka; the annual E.O.E. Pereira Memorial Lecture; and the E.O.E. Pereira Gold Medal at the Faculty of Engineering, University of Peradeniya.

== Family ==
Prof. Pereira was married to Mavis Scharenguivel in 1939 and had three children: Lorenz, Bryan and Alan. His grandfather, Edwin C. Pereira, was a member of the first class of students to graduate from the Ceylon Medical College in 1872.

Academic offices
| Preceded by M. J. Perera | Vice Chancellor of the University of Ceylon; 1969 - 1971 | Succeeded by Prof. B.A. Abeywickrema |
