= Nicholas Attygalle =

Ceylonese academic, surgeon and Senator

Senator Sir Nicholas Attygalle KBE FRCS FRCOG
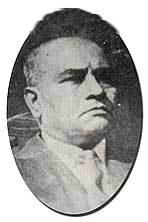

President of the Senate of Ceylon
- In office 1953–1960
- Preceded by: Gerard Wijeyekoon
- Succeeded by: Cyril de Zoysa

Vice-Chancellor of the University of Ceylon
- In office 1954–1967
- Preceded by: Ivor Jennings
- Succeeded by: S. J. Walpita

Personal details
- Born: 14 July 1894
- Died: 27 March 1970 (aged 75)
- Spouse: Lady Conyta Attygalle
- Children: Lakshman Attygalle, Anula Wijesinha
- Education: Royal College Colombo, Ceylon Medical College
- Occupation: Academic
- Profession: Physician

Sir Nicholas Attygalle KBE FRCS FRCOG (14 July 1894 – 27 March 1970) was a Ceylonese academic, surgeon and a Senator. He was the President of the Senate of Ceylon from 1953 to 1960 and the first Ceylonese Vice-Chancellor of the University of Ceylon, where he was known as the "Iron Vice Chancellor".

== Early life and education ==
He was born on 14 July 1894 to the prominent Attygalle family from Madapatha, he was the fifth in a family of eleven which included nine sons and two daughters. His father, Don Louis Attygalle, was a shroff and later served as the Mudaliyar of the Ratnapura Kachcheri. A part time Ayurveda practitioner, Don Louis Attygalle died when Nicholas was seventeen. His mother was Dolicia Jane Haddagoda. Cyril Attygalle was one of his brothers.

Attygalle received his primary education at St. Luke's College, Ratnapura and his secondary education at Royal College Colombo before entering the Ceylon Medical College in 1913 where he passed LMS in 1919, topping the batch and obtaining a first class in the final examination. He was awarded the Vanderstraten Gold Medal for Pathology. After graduating he joined the Ceylon Medical Service. In 1925 Attygalle left for Britain for further studies and returned in 1929 with his MRCS, LRCP (London), DLO (London) and FRCS (England).

== Career ==
Having joined the Ceylon Medical Service after graduating, he served as a field doctor until he left for Britain. On his return he was denied a post of ENT surgeon and instead was sent as DMO Nawalapitiya where there were no facilities for any surgery.

In 1931 he took up the post of demonstrator in anatomy in spite having his FRCS (England). Again this may have been the only occasion where a qualified Surgeon with an FRCS was appointed demonstrator in anatomy. Thereafter he served as Surgical Registrar, General Hospital (1932) and Senior Clinical Tutor (1933) before he was select to be trained as the Gynaecologist of the General Hospital, by the then Director, Health Services, Dr. Rupert Briercliffe. Attygalle was the first Ceylonese to obtain MRCOG (Gr Britain) after which he spent time in Vienna to follow a course in Gynaecological Pathology and Physiology where he also studied operative techniques in Gynecology. Soon after he was enrolled as a member of the Austrian Medical Association and succeeded Dr. Lucian De Zilva as the Gynecologist of the General Hospital in 1935. The ward 9 which he headed remains the University Gynaecology Ward (ward 39) at present. He was a close associate of Lord Webb-Johnson and Dr Samson Wright.

In 1944 he was appointed Professor and Head of the Obstetrics and Gynaecology department and was the first to practice both Obstetrics and Gynaecology and in 1945 he became Dean of the Medical faculty of the University of Ceylon. Holding the post until 1953, Departments of Bacteriology, Biochemistry, Paediatrics, Parasitology and Pharmacology were established in the Colombo Medical Faculty and postgraduate examinations in Medicine (MD, MS and MOG) also commenced during this period.

In 1952 he was appointed to the Senate of Ceylon, the Upper House of Parliament and was made its president in 1953 and knighted as a Knights Bachelor in the 1953 Coronation Honours for services to medicine. In 1954 he became the first Ceylonese Vice-Chancellor of University of Ceylon, succeeding Sir Ivor Jennings, a post he head till his retirement in 1967. From 1964 to 1969 he was the president of the Ceylon Medical Council. Attygalle served as president of the Sri Lanka Medical Association and chairman of the National Science Council. He was one of the founders of the Association of Southeast Asian Institutions of Higher Learning, Member of the Council of the Association of Commonwealth Universities and president of the Inter University Board of India and Sri Lanka.

He was also the president of the Buddhist Theosophical Society, succeeding S. W. R. D. Bandaranaike, vice-president of the Royal College Union, chairman of the board of trustees of Ananda College and was president of the Vidyalankara Sabha.

== Family ==
Nicholas Attygalle and Conita Attygalle in 1925 who was the granddaughter of Dr John Attygalle, one of the first doctors qualified in western medicine. They had a son, Dr. Lakshman Attygalle, FRCS, and a daughter, Anula Wijesinha.

== See also ==
- University of Ceylon
- Senate of Ceylon

Government offices
Preceded by	President of the Senate of Ceylon; 1953–1960	Succeeded by Sir Cyril de Zoysa
Academic offices
Preceded by Sir Ivor Jennings	Vice-Chancellor of the University of Ceylon; 1954–1967	Succeeded by O.H. de A. Wijesekera
