= Mohamed Macan Markar =

Ceylonese colonial era legislator and businessman

Sir Mohamed Macan Markar

Minister of Communications and Works
- In office 1931–1936

Personal details
- Born: 7 September 1877 Galle
- Died: 10 May 1952 (aged 74) Colombo
- Education: Wesley College, Colombo
- Occupation: businessmen, legislator

Sir Hadji Mohamed Macan Markar (7 September 1877 – 10 May 1952) was a prominent Ceylonese colonial era legislator and businessmen. He was Minister of Home Affairs of the State Council, member of the Legislative Council and a Senator.

Markar was born 5 October 1885 in Galle, the son of Oduma Lebbe Marikar Macan Markar, a wealthy merchant from Galle, and was educated at Wesley College, Colombo, where he played cricket before going into the family business.

Markar was elected as a member of the Legislative Council of Ceylon in 1924 and later to the State Council. He became the Minister of Communications and Works. He was knighted in the 1938 Birthday Honours as a Knight Bachelor. From 1948 to 1952 he was a member of the Senate of Ceylon. He was knighted in 1938.

Markar had three sons, notably Ahmed Hussain Macan Markar, former member of parliament for Batticaloa, and Muhammad Ajward Macan Markar, FRCP, professor of medicine, University of Ceylon, Peradeniya.

== See also ==
- List of political families in Sri Lanka

== External links and references ==
- Dr. T. B. Jayah loved humanity
- Mohamed Ajwad Macan Markar
