= Namel Weeramuni =

- Born: 31 August 1934 (age 92); Ahungalle, Sri Lanka
- Education: Nalanda College Colombo
- Occupations: Film director, dramatist, actor, playwright
- Spouse: Malini Weeramuni
- Children: 3

Namel Weeramuni (නාමෙල් වීරමුණි) is a Sri Lankan film director, actor, dramatist, playwright and lawyer.

== Early life ==
Namel Weeramuni was born in Ahungalle in Balapitiya to a wholesale Cinnamon businessman father and housewife mother. After schooling at village school, Peradeniya Maha Vidyalaya and St. Luke’s College in Ratnapura, Namel entered Nalanda College Colombo. Namel was the President of Nalanda College English and Sinhala Literary Unions and lead debating teams in both languages.

Later he entered University of Peradeniya and graduated with a degree in Sociology. Namel was also the second Communist president in the university.

Namel is the owner of Punchi Theater in Borella that promotes arts and culture in this Sri Lanka and founder of the Namel and Malini Art Circle.

=== Selected Television Series ===
- Aluth Gedara
- Pipi Piyum
