= Ahmed Hussain Macan Markar =

Sri Lankan politician (1911–1985)

Hon. Ahmed Hussain Macan Markar

Member of Parliament for Batticaloa

Personal details
- Born: 27 April 1911
- Died: 15 July 1985 (aged 74)
- Education: Royal College, Colombo
- Occupation: Politician
- Profession: Lawyer

Ahmed Hussain Macan Markar (27 April 1911 - 15 July 1985) was a Ceylonese (Sri Lankan) lawyer, politician and philanthropist. He was a former Member of parliament and a deputy mayor of Colombo.

Born to Sir Mohamed Macan Markar, he was educated at the Royal College Colombo, he gained a B.A. and an LL.B. from the University of Cambridge and qualified as a barrister.

Moving into politics in Macan Markar, entered the Colombo Municipal Council where he was a member for 20 years where he served as the deputy mayor. Later he was elected to parliament from the Kalkudah and later Batticaloa seats. A founding member of the Saracen Sports Club and founding board member of the Muslim Ladies College he was the co-founder and the honorary joint secretary and treasurer of the Moors' Islamic Cultural Home (Inc.) from its inception and the vice president of the All Ceylon Moors' Association.

He was the younger brother of Muhammad Ajward Macan Markar.

== See also ==
- List of political families in Sri Lanka
