= Lorenz Pereira =

Sri Lankan cricketer

Personal information
- Full name: Eustace Lorenz Pereira
- Born: 4 July 1939 (age 87); Colombo, Western Province, Ceylon
- Batting: Left-handed
- Bowling: Right-arm off break

Domestic team information
- Years: Team
- 1962–1963: Cambridge University

Career statistics
Competition	First-class
Matches	2
Runs scored	11
Batting average	11.00
100s/50s	–/–
Top score	8*
Catches/stumpings	–/–
- Source: Cricinfo, 26 January 2022

Eustace Lorenz Pereira (born 4 July 1939) is a Sri Lankan former first-class cricketer.

The son of E. O. E. Pereira, he was born at Colombo in July 1939. Pereira was educated at Royal College in Colombo, where he played for the college cricket team. From there he travelled to England to study at Fitzwilliam College, Cambridge. While studying at Cambridge, he played first-class cricket for Cambridge University Cricket Club in 1962 and 1963, making one appearance against the Free Foresters in 1962 and Nottinghamshire in 1962. He scored 11 runs in these matches, with a highest score of 8 not out.

After graduating from Cambridge he returned to Sri Lanka, before emigrating to Australia where he worked for and Town and Country Planning Board in Victoria, eventually becoming a senior city planner in Melbourne. Amongst his achievements was the introduction of the retractable roof on the Rod Laver Arena.
