= Association of Southeast Asian Institutions of Higher Learning =

Non-governmental organization

The Association of Southeast Asian Institutions of Higher Learning (ASAIHL) is a non-governmental organization (NGO). Its aim is to assist member institutions to strengthen themselves through mutual self-help to achieve distinction in teaching, research, and public service, thereby contributing to their respective nations and beyond. Established in Bangkok in January 1955, it is one of the oldest regional organizations in Southeast Asia. As of 2016 the ASAIHL Secretary-General is Ninnat Olanvoravuth of Chulalongkorn University.

== Members ==
As of 2025, ASAIHL has 263 member institutions from 27 countries.

Country	Number of Member Institutions
Brunei	1
Cambodia	5
France	2
Hong Kong	9
India	1
Indonesia	46
Iran	24
Malaysia	26
Maldives	1
Myanmar	1
Philippines	48
Poland	1
Singapore	2
Sri Lanka	3
South Africa	1
Thailand	48
Vietnam	3
East Timor	1
Australia	18
Canada	2
Japan	3
New Zealand	5
Sweden	1
Taiwan	1
UK	2
USA	7
Uzbekistan	1

== Founders ==
1. Sir Nicholas Attygalle, University of Ceylon
2. Air Marshal Muni M. Vejyant Rangshrisht, Chulalongkorn University
3. Lindsay Ride, University of Hong Kong
4. Bahder Djohan, University of Indonesia
5. Sir Sydney Caine, University of Malaya
6. Vidal A. Tan, University of the Philippines
7. Htin Aung, University of Rangoon
8. Nguyễn Quang Trình, National University of Vietnam
