= S. J. Walpita =

Sri Lankan diplomat (died 2007)

S.J. Walpita, CCS (died June 2, 2007) was a Sri Lankan civil servant and diplomat. He was the former permanent secretary of the Ministry of Industries & Fisheries and vice chancellor of University of Ceylon, Peradeniya. He was also Ceylon's ambassador to the Federal Republic of Germany, the Netherlands, Seychelles and Belgium.

He was educated at Royal Collage Colombo and University College, Colombo prior to taking a position as a research assistant and demonstrator in physics at the University of Ceylon. He remained there until 1945. After a stint in the Ceylon Civil Service, he became additional controller and then controller of establishments in the General Treasury in 1958. He held a number of other positions in civil service before taking the appointment of vice chancellor, University of Ceylon, Peradeniya, in 1966. After only two years in that role, he became Ambassador of Ceylon to the Federal Government of Germany, the Netherlands and Belgium, serving between 1968 and 1972.

Academic offices
Preceded by Nicholas Attygalle	Vice-Chancellor of the University of Ceylon (Peradeniya); 1966–1968	Succeeded by M. J. Perera
