= Priyanga Ranasinghe =

Sri Lankan pharmacology professor

- Born: November 20, 1982 (age 43)
- Occupations: Physician, clinical pharmacologist, academic, and researcher

Academic background
- Education: M.B.B.S. M.D. Ph.D.
- Alma mater: University of Colombo

Academic work
- Institutions: University of Colombo

Priyanga Ranasinghe (born November 20, 1982) is a physician, clinical pharmacologist, academic, and researcher. He is a professor in Pharmacology at the Faculty of Medicine, University of Colombo.

Ranasinghe's research focuses on non-communicable diseases such as hypertension and diabetes, as well as herbal medicines, and pharmacogenomics. He is a fellow of the Royal College of Physicians of Edinburgh.

== Education ==
Ranasinghe completed his M.B.B.S. from the University of Colombo in 2008. Later, he received an M.D. (Medicine) and a Ph.D. in Clinical Pharmacology from the University of Colombo in 2018.

== Career ==
Ranasinghe joined the University of Colombo as a research associate in 2008, a position he held until 2009. From 2012 to 2018, he worked as a lecturer in the Department of Pharmacology at the University of Colombo. Following this, he was then appointed as a senior lecturer in the same department from 2018 to 2019. Since 2019, he has been a professor at the University of Colombo. During this time, he has been the head of the Department of Pharmacology and chairperson of the Ethics Review Committee at the Faculty of Medicine.

From 2021 to 2023, Ranasinghe served a specialty registrar in Clinical Pharmacology and Therapeutics, Acute and General Medicine at the Royal Infirmary of Edinburgh. In 2022, he became a board certified specialist in Clinical Pharmacology and Therapeutics in Sri Lanka. He was the secretary of the Sri Lanka Association of Clinical Pharmacology and Therapeutics (SLACPT) from 2023 to 2024, where he continues as a council member for the term 2025 to 2026. He is also an Ambassador of the British Pharmacological Society (BPS).

== Research ==
Ranasinghe's research has focused on the risk factors of diabetes, hypertension, and cardiovascular disease, with attention to metabolic syndrome, which he identified as a rapidly growing public health concern in Asia. His studies and clinical trials have demonstrated that zinc supplementation significantly improves metabolic health by reducing glycemic indices, such as postprandial glucose, fasting blood sugar, and HbA1c, decreasing insulin resistance while increasing β-cell function, and lowering the progression from prediabetes to diabetes. He further reported beneficial effects of zinc on lipid profiles in both healthy and non-healthy individuals.

In addition, Ranasinghe explored the pharmacological potential of Cinnamomum verum (Ceylon Cinnamon), demonstrating its safety in healthy adults and showing that its daily doses were well tolerated while providing metabolic benefits. His experimental studies further showed that Cinnamomum zeylanicum extracts lowered blood glucose in diabetic models, with stem bark fractions also effective in managing type 2 diabetes mellitus. Beyond metabolic research, he examined irrational drug use, demonstrating the need for corrective measures to promote rational prescribing, and emphasized that producing data on frequently prescribed medicines throughout the health system supports better health management and enhances outcome-based medical education.

Ranasinghe has also conducted research on improving hypertension prevention, detection, and noted that new therapies targeting biological mechanisms could enhance long-term treatment outcomes. His studies also examined CYP2C19 and CES1 gene variants influencing clopidogrel metabolism in Sri Lankan populations, highlighting the impact of genetic variation on antiplatelet efficacy. His work also reflects broader pharmacogenomic principles, emphasizing how genetic variability contributes to differences in the efficacy and safety of therapeutic agents, including anti-cancer drugs. He has reported that certain minor allele frequencies may elevate the risk of statin-induced myotoxicity, supporting his work on genotype-phenotype correlations in statin-treated Sri Lankan patients. He has been named in the Stanford/Elsevier World's Top 2% Scientists list in 2022, 2023, and 2024.

== Awards and honors ==
- 2014 – CVCD Lifetime Research Excellence Award in Health Sciences, University of Colombo
- 2020 – Senate Award for Research Excellence, University of Colombo
- 2022 – Vice Chancellor's Award for Research Excellence, University of Colombo
- 2024 – Fellow, Royal College of Physicians of Edinburgh
