= P. H. D. Waidyatilleka =

- Born: Balapitiya
- Education: Richmond College (Sri Lanka); Nalanda College Colombo; University of Ceylon; University of Birmingham
- Known for: Civil Engineer / Sports administration

P. H. D. Waidyatilleka is a well known sports administrator and a Civil engineer. He is the first Sri Lankan to be appointed as an International Technical Officer (ITO) by International Association of Athletics Federations (IAAF), and the only Sri Lankan to qualify as an IAAF Lecturer.

== Early childhood and education ==
Waidyatilleka was born in Balapitiya and was educated at Richmond College (Sri Lanka) and Nalanda College, Colombo. While at both colleges he excelled in athletics. Later after completing his secondary studies from Nalanda College Colombo he entered University of Ceylon and graduated as a Civil Engineer with a Bachelor of Science (Engineering) Degree. Later he obtained a Master of Science in Engineering from University of Birmingham in United Kingdom.

== Career ==
Waidyatilleka began his career as an instructor at University of Ceylon and later joined State Engineering Corporation (SEC) of Sri Lanka as a Civil Engineer. Then under its Chairmanship of Dr A. N. S. Kulasinghe, Waidyatilleka contributed his services to the construction of Watadageya (outer layer of the Chaithiya) of the Kalutara Chaithya, as Chief Engineer.

== Sports administration ==
Waidyatilleka is the President of the Sri Lanka Masters Athletics (Veterans), President Athletic Technical Officials Association of Sri Lanka, Member Technical Committee Asian Athletics Association, Chairman Technical Committee Asian Masters Athletics, Member of Stadia Committee World Masters Athletics and International Technical Officer of World Masters Athletics. He was a senior vice president of the Athletic Association of Sri Lanka.

== Honors and awards ==
- Fellow of Institution of Engineers, Sri Lanka.

He is also a Charted Engineer of Institution of Civil Engineers UK.

== General references ==
- "A silent colossus- an upright decision maker -Sportsman, competent engineer and administrator". Sunday Observer. 2006.
- "Waidyatilleka was a true sportsman-AASL President". Island. 2004.
- "Champion hurdler turns athletics official". Island. 2005.
- Ranjith, Waidy back in AVA Association
