= S. Selvanayagam =

Ceylon Tamil academic

S. Selvanayagam FRGS
- Born: 28 May 1932
- Died: 23 May 1979 (aged 46)
- Education: University of Ceylon; London School of Economics
- Occupation: Academic

Somasundaram Selvanayagam (28 May 1932 – 23 May 1979) was a Ceylon Tamil geographer, academic and head of the Department of Geography at the University of Jaffna.

== Early life ==
Selvanayagam was born on 28 May 1932. He was educated at Jaffna Hindu College and Zahira College, Colombo. He joined the University of Ceylon, Peradeniya in 1953, graduating in 1957 with BA honours degree in geography.

== Career ==
After graduating Selvanayagam worked for a while at the Official Languages Department. He then joined the University of Ceylon, Peradeniya as an assistant lecturer in 1951. He joined the London School of Economics (LSE) in October 1961 for postgraduate studies, graduating with a MA degree. He returned to the LSE in 1970 to continue his research, receiving a Phd in August 1971.

Selvanayagam joined the Ahmadu Bello University's Department of Geography in 1974 as a senior lecturer. He left Ahmadu Bello in August 1977 after being appointed head of the Department of Geography at the University of Sri Lanka (Jaffna campus).

Selvanayagam was a fellow of the Royal Geographical Society. He died on 23 May 1979.
