= Samson Wright =

British medical physiologist

- Born: 5 July 1899
- Died: 10 March 1956 (aged 56)
- Occupation: Physiologist

Samson Wright (5 July 1899 - 10 March 1956) was a British medical physiologist who is mentioned as "undoubtedly the greatest teacher of physiology of his generation and author of the world famous textbook Applied Physiology" in his biographical memoir published at his birth centenary in the Journal of the Royal Society of Medicine.

Samson Wright's Applied Physiology textbook has been translated into many languages. After his death his pupil wrote the newer editions till thirteenth edition. The book remains a bible for experimental physiology.
