= Nihal Seneviratne =

Sri Lankan civil servant (1934–2026)

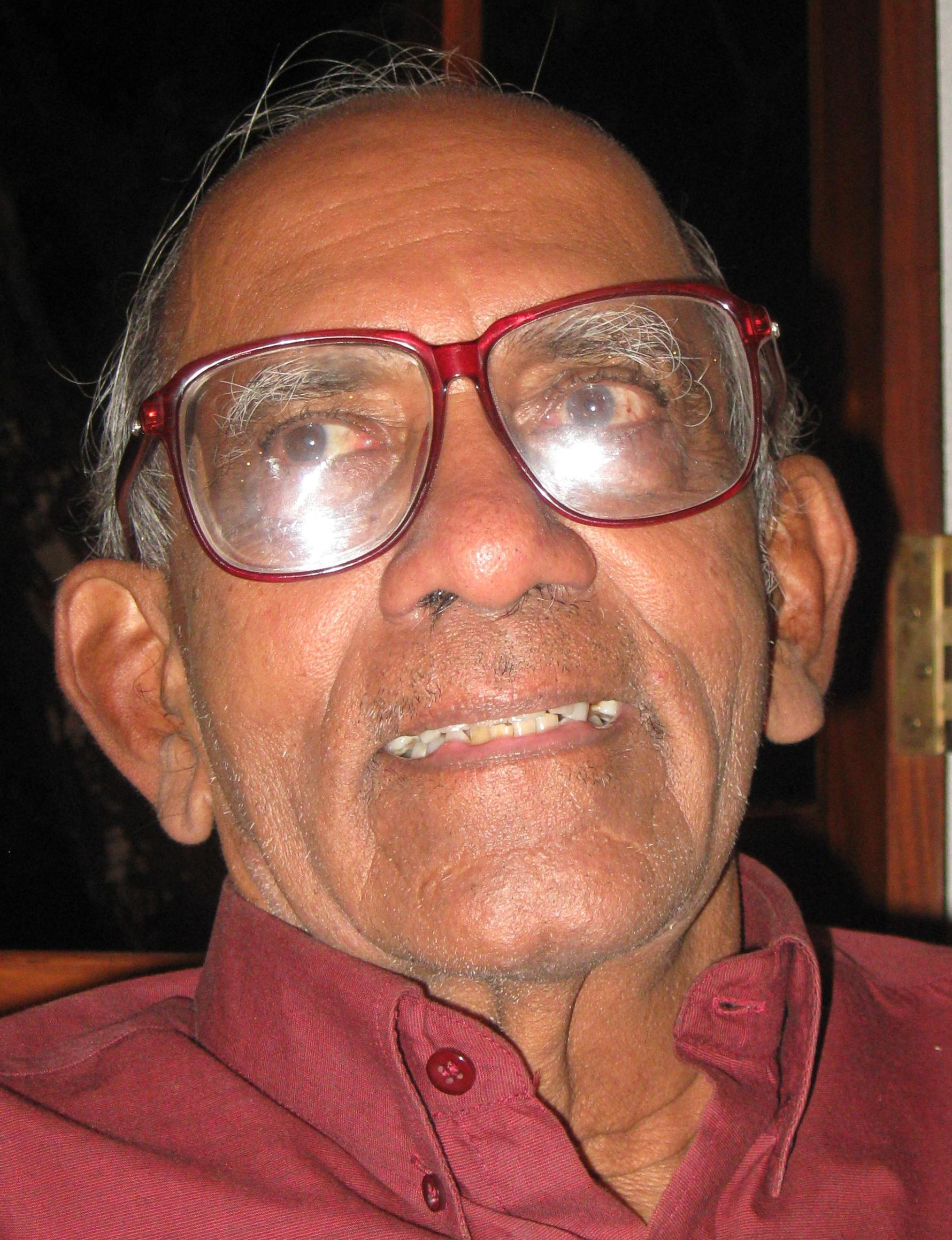
- Born: 29 May 1934; Colombo, British Ceylon
- Died: 6 January 2026 (aged 91); Colombo, Sri Lanka
- Education: Royal College Colombo; University of Ceylon, Peradeniya
- Spouse(s): Srima Seneviratne (née Perera)
- Children: Satyajit and Shanika
- Relatives: K. N. Seneviratne (brother)

Nihal Seneviratne (29 May 1934 – 6 January 2026) was a Sri Lankan civil servant. He served as the Secretary General of Parliament from 1 August 1981 to 27 May 1994.

== Life and career ==
Educated at the Royal College, Colombo and graduated with an LL.B. degree in law from the University of Ceylon, Peradeniya. His brother, Kirthi Nissanka Seneviratne, was a professor of Medicine and founder director of Sri Lanka's Postgraduate Institute of Medicine.

Upon graduation he joined the office of the clerk of House of Representatives, and went on to become the Secretary General of Parliament. He was Secretary General and present at the parliament during the 1987 grenade attack in the Sri Lankan Parliament.

Seneviratne died on 6 January 2026, at the age of 91.

== Works ==
- Seneviratne, Nihal (2017). A Clerk Reminisces. Minas Publication. ISBN 978-955-4682-25-2.
- Seneviratne, Nihal (2022). Memories of 33 Years in Parliament. Sarasavi Publishers. ISBN 978-955-31-2369-5.
