= H. R. Piyasiri =

Sri Lankan politician

Hon. H. R. Piyasiri

Member of Parliament for Matara
- In office 1989–1994

Southern Province Council
- In office 2004–2009

Personal details
- Born: Handunnetti Rannulu Piyasiri Matara, Sri Lanka
- Party: United National Party
- Relations: H. R. Wimalasiri; H.R. Amaraweera
- Education: Nalanda College Colombo
- Occupation: Politics

Handunnetti Rannulu Piyasiri (known as H. R. Piyasiri) was a Member of Parliament and a member of the Southern Province Council. He is also the current Sri Lankan Ambassador in Myanmar.

He was the State Minister of Labor and Vocational Training and was also one time Chairman of Lotteries Board.

He was educated at Nalanda College Colombo. While at school he played for First XI cricket team in 1960 that was captained by Gamini Jayawickrama Perera.

== See also ==
- List of Sri Lankan non-career diplomats
