= Nira Wickramasinghe =

Sri Lankan historian

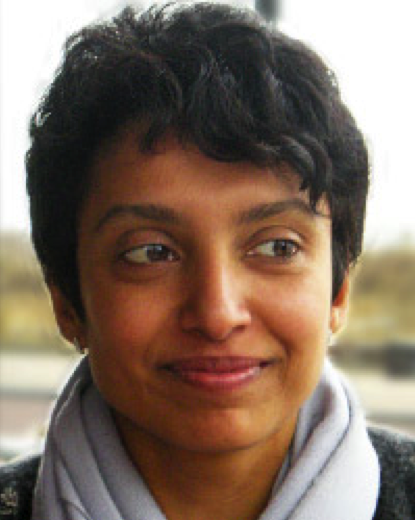
- Born: Colombo, Sri Lanka
- Other name: Nira Konjit Samarasinghe
- Education: D.Phil.
- Occupation: University Professor

Nira Konjit Wickramasinghe is professor of modern South Asian studies at Leiden University in the Netherlands and a well known international academic. She was a professor in the department of history and international relations, University of Colombo, Sri Lanka, until 2009. She grew up in Paris and studied at the University of Paris IV - Sorbonne from 1981 to 1984 and at the University of Oxford from 1985 to 1989, where she earned her doctorate in modern history. She joined the University of Colombo in 1990 and taught there until 2009. She has been a World Bank Robert McNamara fellow, a Fulbright senior scholar at New York University, a visiting professor at the Ecole des Hautes Etudes en Sciences Sociales in Paris, and more recently British Academy Fellow at St Antony's College, Oxford. She worked on a history of the reception of the sewing machine in colonial Sri Lanka, a topic which she researched while on sabbatical at the Shelby Cullom Davis Center for Historical Studies Princeton University in 2008–2009. Her current research addresses the genre of minor histories through studies of enslaved people and migrants in the Indian Ocean world. In 2026 Scribe Publishers (UK and AU) and St Martin's Press will publish her first trade book: Cinnamon: A History of Taste and Empire.

== Select publications ==
Wickramasinghe has published the following books:

- Cinnamon: a History of Taste and Empire (forthcoming)
- "Monsoon Asia: a Reader on South and Southeast Asia" co-edited with D.Henley. Leiden: Leiden University Press 2023.
- Slave in a Palanquin: Colonial Servitude and Resistance in Sri Lanka. New York: Columbia University Press, 2020
- Sri Lanka in the Modern Age. A History. Revised edn. New York, New Delhi : Oxford University Press, 2015
- Metallic Modern. Everyday Machines in Colonial Sri Lanka, Oxford: Berghahn Publ. 2014
- Sri Lanka in the modern age: A history of contested identities. London: Hurst & Co. and Honolulu: University of Hawaii press, 2006.
- Civil society in Sri Lanka: New circles of power. New Delhi: Sage Publications, c2001.
- Ethnic politics in colonial Sri Lanka, 1927–1947''. New Delhi: Vikas Pub. House, 1995.
- University space and values: Three essays''. Colombo: International Centre for Ethnic Studies Colombo, 2005.
- L'Invention du Vetement national au Sri Lanka. Habiller le corps colonise''. Paris: Karthala Presse, 2006.
