= R. Kanagasuntheram =

Professor R. Kanagasuntheram FZS C.Biol F.I.Biol
- Born: 13 October 1919; Karainagar, Ceylon
- Died: 19 June 2010 (aged 90); Adelaide, Australia
- Education: Karainagar Hindu College; Jaffna Hindu College; University of Ceylon; University of Cambridge
- Occupation: Academic
- Title: Dean of the Faculty of Medicine, University of Jaffna
- Term: July 1981 – December 1983
- Predecessor: A. A. Hoover
- Successor: C. Sivagnanasundram

Professor Ragunathar Kanagasuntheram (13 October 1919 – 19 June 2010) was a Sri Lankan Tamil physician, zoologist, academic and dean of the Faculty of Medicine at the University of Jaffna.

== Early life and family ==
Kanagasuntheram was born on 13 October 1919 in Karainagar in northern Ceylon. He was the son of Ragunathar, a teacher from Karainagar. He was educated at Karainagar Hindu College and Jaffna Hindu College. After school he joined Ceylon Medical College in 1938. He graduated from the University of Ceylon in 1944 with a first class honours MBBS degree and was awarded the Rockwood Gold Medal. He passed the part 1 of the Fellowship of the Royal College of Surgeons exam in 1947 but did not sit the part 2 exam for health reasons.

Kanagasuntheram married Sornam. They had two sons (Narendran and Rajendran) and three daughters (Pathmini, Bhavani and Panja).

== Career ==
Kanagasuntheram joined the University of Ceylon, Colombo as a lecturer in anatomy in 1948. He then proceeded to the University of Cambridge from where he received a PhD degree in 1952. He won colours at Cambridge in tennis.

Kanagasuntheram then worked at the University of Khartoum from 1958 and 1962 as a senior lecturer and reader of anatomy. He was appointed Professor of Anatomy and head of the Department of Anatomy at the University of Singapore in 1962. He was the first Asian to chair the department. He retired in 1979 and was appointed emeritus professor in 1981. He was visiting professor at Flinders University.

Kanagasuntheram was Professor of Anatomy and head of the Department of Anatomy at the University of Jaffna. He was dean of the Faculty of Medicine at the university from July 1981 to December 1983.

Kanagasuntheram became a member of the Anatomical Society of Great Britain and Ireland in 1951, and later on was made a life member. He was a fellow of the Zoological Society of London, fellow of the Institute of Biology and a member of the Academy of Medicine of Singapore. He was awarded an honorary doctorate from the University of Jaffna.

The National University of Singapore has named a bursary in honour of Kanagasuntheram.

== Later life ==
Kanagasuntheram returned to Singapore. He died on 19 June 2010 in Adelaide, Australia.

== Works ==
- A New Approach to Dissection of the Human Body: A Thirty Week Schedule Incorporating the Objective Method of Learning by R. Kanagasuntheram, P. Sivanandasigham and A. Krishnamurti (1977, Singapore University Press; ISBN 9971690128)
- Anatomy: Regional, Functional and Clinical by R. Kanagasuntheram, P. Sivanandasigham and A. Krishnamurti (1987, PG Medical Books; ISBN 9789971973926)
- A New Approach of the Human Body by R. Kanagasuntheram and P. Sivanandasigham (1988, PG Publishing; ISBN 9813096160)
- Textbook of Anatomy by R. Kanagasuntheram, P. Sivanandasigham and A. Krishnamurti (1996, Sangam Books; ISBN 0-86311-652-3)
