= Muhammad Ajward Macan Markar =

Sri Lankan physician

Muhammad Ajward Macan Markar is a Sri Lankan physician, academic. He was the first Professor of Medicine at the University of Ceylon, Peradeniya.

Born to Sir Mohamed Macan Markar, he was educated at Royal College Colombo, where he played cricket for the college at the Royal-Thomian. Macan Markar went on to study medicine at the University of Ceylon, where he also represented the university at cricket. Graduating with a MBBS and winning the gold medal for in obstetrics and gynaecology, he went on to gain MBBS and M.D. from the University of London and MRCP by 1952. He is a Fellow of the Royal College of Physicians.

He was the younger brother of Ahmed Hussain Macan Markar.
