= Sam Karunaratne =

Sri Lankan academic (b.1937)

Sam Karunaratne CEng, FIET, FIEE, FIESL

Chancellor and President of the Sri Lanka Institute of Information Technology
- In office 1999–2015

Personal details
- Born: 1937 (age 88–89) Makoora, Kegalle
- Spouse: Kusuma Ediriweera Jayasooriya
- Education: University of Ceylon; University of Glasgow
- Profession: Academic

Samarajeewa "Sam" Karunaratne, FIET, FIEE, FIESL (born in 1937) is an emeritus professor of engineering and a leading Sri Lankan academic who is the founding chancellor and president of the Sri Lanka Institute of Information Technology and the former vice-chancellor of the University of Moratuwa. He has held a number of other appointments in the field of higher education in Sri Lanka, including senior professor of electrical engineering and dean of the Faculty of Engineering and Architecture, president of the Institution of Engineers, Sri Lanka. Karunaratne is a pioneer in the development of the use of computers in the field of engineering and played an important role in the development of information technology education and industry in Sri Lanka.

== Early life and education ==
Karunaratne was born as Samarajeewa Karunaratne to a family of land proprietors, Mr. and Mrs. T. Karunaratne in Makoora, Kegalle. He had his early education at Bandaranaike Maha Vidyalaya, Hettimulla and received his secondary education at St. Mary's College, Kegalle. He then went on to do his higher studies at the University of Ceylon, where he gained a first class honours degree in electrical engineering. He then achieved his MSc degree in engineering from the University of Glasgow and a diploma in electrical engineering from the University of London.

He is a chartered engineer of both Sri Lanka and the United Kingdom, a fellow of the British Institution of Engineering and Technology (IET), fellow of the Institution of Engineers, Sri Lanka (FIESL), a fellow of the Institution of Electrical Engineers, London (FIEE), and a fellow of the National Academy of Sciences Sri Lanka.

== Career ==
Karunaratne took part in many major construction projects in Sri Lanka, pioneering the use of computer aided designing.

An electrical engineer by profession, he took up to university teaching and was a lecturer in electrical engineering at the University of Ceylon, Peradeniya before moving to the University of Moratuwa as a professor of electrical engineering in July 1969, where he held the chair from then until his retirement 9 October 2002. He has been the teacher of over 500 electrical engineers who hold high positions in Sri Lanka and internationally.

He has been in universities in Sri Lanka and abroad since he joined the university as an undergraduate in 1956, except for a two-year period when he was with the State Engineering Corporation. During his time at the State Engineering Corporation, from 1967 to 1968, he was in charge of the country's first digital computer installation and he computerised the design of civil engineering structures, including the Kalutara Cetiya (Kalutara Degoba), a thick shell design that is the world's only hollow Buddhist shrine. He was responsible for the computerisation of the GCE Ordinary-Level and Advanced-Level examination processing in 1968, with over 350,000 candidates.

As the head of the Department of Electrical Engineering, he spearheaded the establishment of the Department of Computer Engineering. He then became the dean of the Faculty of Engineering, and later the vice-chancellor of the University of Moratuwa. He is considered to be the chief contributor towards the development of the Department of Electrical Engineering to its present status, and has been the teacher of over 500 electrical engineers who hold high positions in Sri Lanka and abroad. These are some of the many notable reasons why he has been awarded the degree of Doctor of Science from the University of Moratuwa.

He has served many institutions as a member of the Governing Board, including the National Engineering Research and Development Centre (NERD); the Natural Resources, Energy and Science Authority of Sri Lanka (NARESA); the Post-Graduate Institute of Management; the Institution of Engineers, Sri Lanka (IESL); the University of Moratuwa, Sri Lanka; the Arthur C. Clarke Centre for Modern Technologies (ACCMT); and the Sri Lanka Broadcasting Corporation (SLBC). He is the recipient of several scholarships and fellowships [Commonwealth Scholarship, Fulbright Scholarship, Commonwealth Fellowship, I.A.E.A Fellowship, Commonwealth Travelling Fellowship, UNESCO Fellowship].

Karunaratne was the President of the Institution of Engineers Sri Lanka. He was also the Director of the Arthur C. Clarke Centre for Modern Technologies, and was a member of the Board of Governors of the United Nations Centre for Space Science and Technology Education Asia-Pacific established in Dehradun, India. His research is mainly in electrical power systems and digital control system, and he has published several papers on these subject. He is a chartered engineer and a Fellow of the Institution of Electrical Engineers, London (FIEE), a Fellow of the Institution of Engineers Sri Lanka (FIESL), and a Fellow of the National Academy of Sciences.

He is the founding President of the Sri Lanka Institute of Information Technology, a leading research and higher education institute in the field of Information Technology, and currently also holds the position of Chancellor and executive head of this institute. He is also a member of the board of directors at the Institute of Technological Studies, Colombo.

== Personal life ==
Karunaratne married Kusuma Ediriweera Jayasooriya in July 1967, who became a renowned professor and Dean of the Faculty of Graduate Studies, University of Colombo. She is a pioneer in the field of Sinhalese Studies and the first female Dean in Sri Lanka.

They have two sons, Savant Kaushalya and Passant Vatsalya, both electrical engineers specialising in Image processing, Graphics, and Video Processing. The elder, Savant Karunaratne has a PhD in Electrical and Computer Engineering from the University of Sydney, Australia. The younger, Passant Karunaratne has a PhD in electrical engineering and computer science from Northwestern University, in Evanston, Illinois, and is a Principal Research Engineer in the United States.

== Awards ==
- Karunaratne is the recipient of several scholarships and fellowships, including the Commonwealth Scholarship, the Fulbright Scholarship, the Commonwealth Fellowship, the International Atomic Energy Agency Fellowship, the Commonwealth Travelling Fellowship, and the UNESCO Fellowship.
- In 2006 Karunaratne was awarded an honorary Doctorate from the University of Moratuwa.

== See also ==
- Sri Lanka Institute of Information Technology

Academic offices
Preceded by	Chancellor of the Sri Lanka Institute of Information Technology; 1999 – present	Succeeded by Incumbent
Preceded by	Vice-Chancellor of the University of Moratuwa; 1995 -1999	Succeeded by
