= J. B. Disanayake =

Deshamanya Prof. J. B. Disanayake
- Born: Jayarathna Bandara Disanayake; 16 April 1937 (age 89); Sri Lanka
- Education: Dharmaraja College; Ananda College; University of Ceylon; University of California, Berkeley
- Occupations: Academic, Ambassador
- Spouse: Kusum Disanayake
- Children: Madhubashini Disanayake - Samitha Disanayake

Deshamanya Prof. Jayaratna Banda Disanayake (born 16 April 1937) is an emeritus professor and one of the leading authorities of the Sinhala language. He was former Sri Lankan Ambassador to Thailand.

== Academia ==
Dissanayake received his primary education at Dharmaraja College, Kandy and secondary education at Ananda College. He graduated from the University of Ceylon, Peradeniya campus in 1961. He later received a Fulbright scholarship to the University of California, Berkeley, to read for a master's degree in linguistics and obtained a PhD from the University of Colombo.

With a long teaching career of over 45 years as a lecturer of the University of Colombo, he is the author of numerous books on linguistics, culture and history. Prior to his retirement Dissanayake served in the capacity of the Head of the Department of Sinhala at the university.

== Publications ==
- Lanka, the land of kings by J. B. Disanayake (Sumitha Publishers, Distributed by Sarasavi Bookshop, 2007)
- Mānava bhāṣā pravēśaya by J. B. Disanayake(Sumita Prakāśakayō, 2005)
- Paintings of Kelani Vihara by J. B. Disanayake(Godage Poth Mendura, 2004)
- Kălaṇi Vihāre situvaṃ by J. B. Disanayake(Goḍagē Pot Măndura, 2000)
- Uḍaraṭa Sinhalaya by J. B. Disanayake(Goḍagē Pot Măndura, 2002)
- Understanding the Sinhalese by J. B. Disanayake (S. Godage & Bros., 1998)
- Siyalanga rū sobā by J. B. Disanayake (Goḍagē Pot Mandura, 1998)
- Banda vaṭā pada raṭā by J. B. Disanayake (s. Goḍagē saha Samāgama, 1996)
- Gamaka suvanda siv siya gavu ăsēya by J. B. Disanayake (s. Goḍagē saha Samāgama, 1996)
- Siṃhala bhāṣāvē nava muhuṇuvara by J. B. Disanayake (Saṃskr̥tika Kaṭayutu Depārtamēntuva, 1996)
- Samakālīna Siṃhala lēkhana vyākaraṇaya by J. B. Disanayake (s. Goḍagē saha Sahōdarayō, 1995)
- The monk and the peasant by J. B. Disanayake (State Print. Corp., 1993)
- Water in culture by J. B. Disanayake (Ministry of Environment & Parliamentary Affairs, 1992)
- Siṃhala budu samaya by J. B. Disanayake (Rajayē Mudraṇa Nītigata Saṃsthāva, 1991)
- Studies in Sinhala literacy by J. B. Disanayake(National Association for Total Education, Sri Lanka, 1990)
- Nūtana Siṃhala lēkhana vyākaraṇaya by J. B. Disanayake (Lēk Havus Invesṭmanṭs, 1990)
- Siṃhala vehera vihāra by J. B. Disanayake(Piyavi Pot Prakāśakayō, 1988)
- Mihintale, cradle of Sinhala Buddhist civilization by J. B. Disanayake(Lake House Investments, 1987)
- Say it in Sinhala by J. B. Disanayake(Lake House Investments Ltd., 1985)
- Aspects of Sinhala folklore by J. B. Disanayake(Lake House Investments, 1984)

== See also ==
- Sri Lankan Non Career Diplomats
