= S. Arasaratnam =

Academic, historian and author

- Born: 20 March 1930; Navaly, Ceylon
- Died: 4 October 1998 (aged 68); Sydney, Australia
- Education: Jaffna College; University of Ceylon; University of London
- Occupation: Academic

Sinnappah Arasaratnam FAHA (20 March 1930 – 4 October 1998) was a Sri Lankan academic, historian and author, born during British colonial rule. Known as 'Arasa', he was a lecturer at the University of Ceylon, University of Malaya and University of New England (Australia).

== Early life and family ==
Arasaratnam was born on 20 March 1930 in Navaly in northern British Ceylon. He was educated at Jaffna College, Vaddukoddai. After school he joined the University of Ceylon in 1947 from where he graduated in 1951 with a First Class Honours BA degree.

Arasaratnam married Thanalakshmi (Padma), daughter of Selvathurai. They had two daughters (Sulochana and Ranjana) and a son (Niranjan). Arasaratnam was a practising Christian who attended the Uniting Church in Armidale, New South Wales.

== Career ==
After graduation in 1951 Arasaratnam was appointed an assistant lecturer of history at the University of Ceylon. In 1954 he joined the University of London to carry out doctoral research and in 1956 he graduated with a Ph.D in history. On returning to Ceylon Arasaratnam rejoined the University of Ceylon as a lecturer. He was appointed lecturer in Indian Studies at the University of Malaya in 1961. He was promoted to professor of history in 1968.

Arasaratnam was appointed second professor in the Department of History at the University of New England (Australia) in 1972. He took up the post in 1973. He held the Smuts Fellowship in Commonwealth Studies, Cambridge in 1977. Arasaratnam retired from the University of New England in March 1995. He was elected a Fellow of the Australian Academy of the Humanities in 1996.

== Death ==
Arasaratnam died suddenly in Sydney, Australia on 4 October 1998. He was 68.

== Works ==
Arasaratnam was prolific writer — he wrote 15 books and 93 articles/chapters. His literary works were achieved while heavily engaged with activities such as sitting on key bodies such as the Academic Advisory Committee.

- Dutch Power in Ceylon, 1658-1687 (1958, Netherlands Institute of Cultural Relations/Djambatan)
- Ceylon (1964, Spectrum/Prentice-Hall)
- Indian festivals in Malaya (1966, University of Malaya)
- Indians in Malaysia and Singapore. Kuala Lumpur: Oxford University Press. 1970. OCLC 6328370.
- Maritime India in the seventeenth century (1994, Oxford University Press) ISBN 978-0-86078-610-8
- Ceylon and the Dutch, 1600-1800 (1996, Variorum) ISBN 978-0-86078-579-8
- Maritime commerce and English power (1996, Variorum)
