= Chandra de Silva =

Sri Lankan academic, historian and author

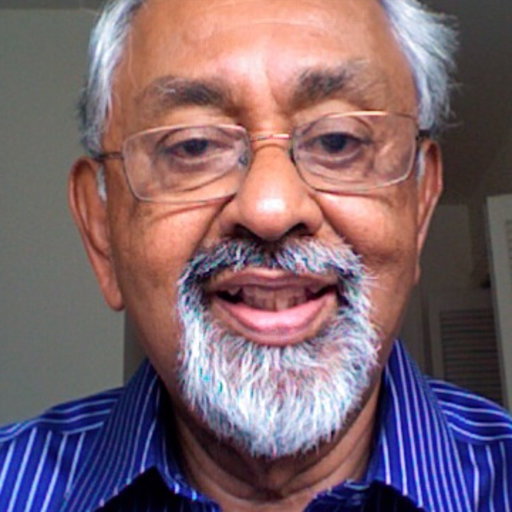
- Born: Chandra Richard de Silva; 1940 (age 85–86)
- Education: St. Peter's College, Bambalapitiya, University of Ceylon; University of London
- Occupation: Academic
- Spouse: Daya de Silva

Chandra Richard de Silva is a Sri Lankan academic, historian and author. A lecturer of history at the Old Dominion University, de Silva has written books on Sri Lankan history.

== Early life and family ==
Chandra Richard de Silva was born in Panadura, Sri Lanka (Ceylon). After his secondary education at St. Peter's College, Bambalapitiya, Chandra De Silva was educated at the University of Ceylon from where he received a BA degree in history in 1962. He received a Ph.D degree in 1968 from the University of London.

== Career ==
De Silva started teaching at the University of Ceylon, Peradeniya in 1963. He was dean of the Faculty of Arts, University of Peradeniya from 1978 to 1981. He became a professor of history at the university in 1984. He was visiting professor of history and Asian studies at Bowdoin College between 1989 and 1991. He was chair of history at Indiana State University between 1991 and 1998. He joined the Old Dominion University in 1998 as its chair of history. He became dean of the university's College of Arts and Letters in June 2003. He is currently vice provost for faculty and program development at the university.

De Silva was awarded a Diplome de Langue Francaise from the Alliance Francaise de Paris in 1987.

== Works ==
De Silva has written the following books.

- The Portuguese in Ceylon 1617-1683 (1972, Cave)
- Sri Lanka: A History (1997, Vikas)
- Portuguese Encounters with Sri Lanka and the Maldives: Translated Texts from the Age of the Discoveries (2009, Ashgate)
