= Savitri Goonesekere =

- Awards: Fukuoka Prize

Academic background
- Education: Ladies College, University of Peradeniya, Harvard Law School

Savitri Goonesekere is a jurist and academic from Sri Lanka. She is an international expert on the rights of children.

== Education ==
Goonesekere studied at Ladies' College, Colombo, and obtained arts and law degrees at the University of Peradeniya in 1961, graduating with First Class Honours. She attended Harvard Law School as a Smith-Mundt Fulbright scholar, where she obtained her master’s degree in 1962.

== Career ==
Goonesekere began her academic career as the first woman law lecturer in the Department of Law, University of Ceylon. She held the post of Senior Lecturer when the Department of Law was moved from the Peradeniya campus to Colombo in 1965, and was established as the University of Ceylon, Colombo. She also taught in the Faculty of Law, Ahmadu Bello University in Nigeria, from 1977 to 1982.

In 1983 Goonesekere was appointed as Professor of Law at the Open University of Sri Lanka, the first woman to hold this position, and was subsequently appointed the Dean of the Faculty of Humanities and Social Sciences. Prof. Goonesekere returned to the University of Colombo in 1995 as Senior Professor of Law, and was the first woman Vice Chancellor of the University of Colombo from 1999 to 2002.

Prof. Goonesekere was awarded an honorary Doctorate of Letters from the Open University of Sri Lanka and an honorary Doctorate of Law by the University of Colombo, in recognition of her contributions to these institutions.

A prolific writer, Goonesekere was instrumental in the evolution of modern legal education in Sri Lanka. Her works on family law and child labour issues include: Child Labour in Sri Lanka: Learning from the Past (ILO:1993); Children, Law and Justice: A South Asian Perspective (Sage: 1998); and as editor, Violence, Law, and Women's Rights in South Asia (Sage:2004).

== Other activities ==
- Global Partnership to End Violence Against Children, Member of the Board (since 2016)

== Recognition ==
- 2008 – Fukuoka Prize
- On 27 March 2019, Goonesekere was celebrated as one 12 Women Changemakers by the Sri Lanka parliament.

== Selected works ==
“The Legal Status of the Female in the Sri Lanka Law on Family Relations” (Gunasena:1980)

“Children, Law and Justice: A South Asian Perspective” (Sage: 1998)
