= Eastman Narangoda =

- Born: Colombo, Sri Lanka
- Education: Nalanda College Colombo
- Occupation: Banker
- Known for: Chairman of Seylan Bank Sri Lanka.

Eastman Narangoda is the current chairman of George Steuart Finance and former chairman of Seylan Bank of Sri Lanka.

== Early life and education ==
After receiving his education from Nalanda College Colombo, he joined the University of Ceylon, then graduating with a Special BA Degree in Economics (specializing in banking & currency). Narangoda chose to do sports at Nalanda, becoming a cricketer, representing First XI during 1965 to 1967.

== Career ==
After his graduation, with an Economics Special Degree, he joined the National Savings Bank as an executive in 1975. Before being appointed to his current position, he was the General Manager and Chief Executive Officer for over five years at National Savings Bank (Sri Lanka).

Eastman is a council member and fellow of the Association of Professional Bankers of Sri Lanka and Sri Lanka Institute of Training and Development.

== Seylan Bank ==
A financial crisis in the early 2000s left the bank in financial trouble. Narangoda was a member of the team, which was appointed as the new board of directors by the Bank of Ceylon for the Seylan Bank. The eleven member team also included Pradeep Kariyawasam and R. Nadarajah. The team managed to rebuild the financial performance of the bank within a six-month time period where they were also able to do innovations for the development of the bank.

== General references ==
- "19 - Seylan Bank, Eastman Narangoda – Chairman". Business Today.
- "Sri Lanka: Seylan Bank net profit for 2010 up by 126%". Asian Tribune By J.A. Fernando in Colombo. 26 March 2011.
