= Ivor Jennings =

British lawyer and academic

Sir Ivor Jennings KBE QC FBA
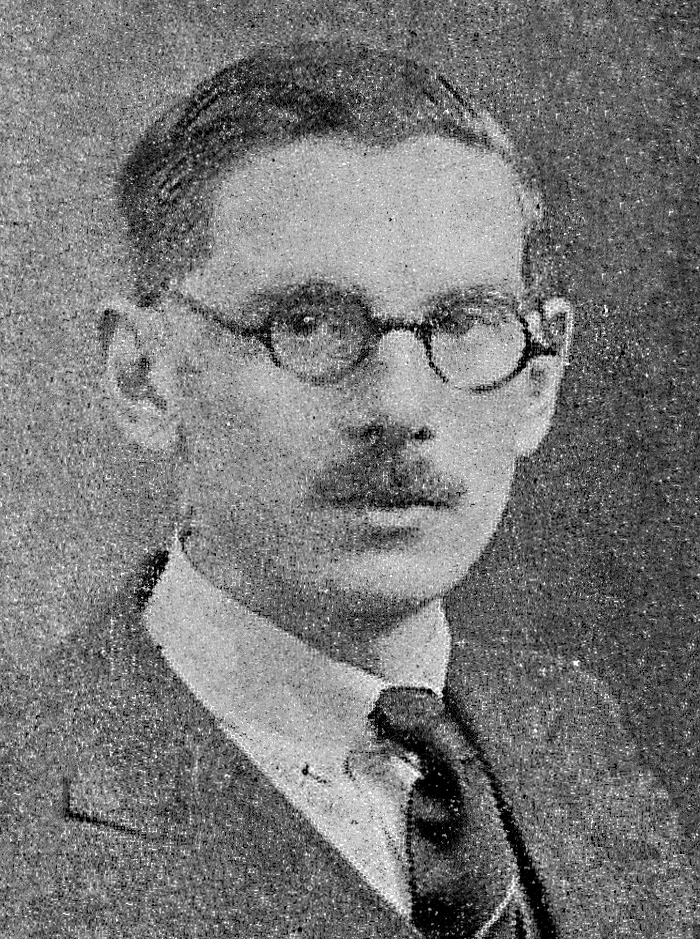

Vice Chancellor of University of Ceylon
- In office 1942–1954
- Preceded by: None
- Succeeded by: Sir Nicholas Attygalle

Personal details
- Born: 16 May 1903 Bristol, England
- Died: 19 December 1965 (aged 62) Cambridge, England
- Profession: Lawyer, academic

Sir William Ivor Jennings KBE QC FBA (Sinhala: ශ්‍රීමත් අයිවර් ජෙනින්ග්ස්) (16 May 1903 – 19 December 1965) was a British lawyer and academic. He served as the vice chancellor of the University of Cambridge (1961–63) and the University of Ceylon (1942–55).

== Education ==
Jennings was educated at Queen Elizabeth's Hospital, Bristol (a boarding school), at Bristol Grammar School and St Catharine's College, Cambridge.

== Career ==
Jennings joined the University of Leeds as a lecturer in law in 1925 and became a Holt Scholar of Gray's Inn and was called to the bar in 1928. The following year he joined the London School of Economics as lecturer in law.

Jennings was sent to Ceylon by the British Government in 1942, as the Principal of the University College, Colombo with a mandate to create a university for that land, then a Crown colony. The institution, on the model of University of London, was dubbed the University of Ceylon and was first established in Colombo, the capital city, then partially transferred in 1952 to a purpose-built campus in Peradeniya. During World War II he served as the Deputy Civil Defence Commissioner.

He was knighted in 1948, made a King's Counsel in 1949, and awarded the KBE in 1955. In 1955, Jennings received an honorary doctorate by vote of the senate of the University of Ceylon to recognize his work in creating and building the institution. A hall of residence at the University of Peradeniya is named in his honour.

In the same year (1955) he returned to Britain to take up the post of Master of Trinity Hall, Cambridge. He subsequently served a term as Vice-Chancellor of the University of Cambridge, a position which at that time rotated among the heads of the colleges.

Jennings married Helen Emily Konsalik in 1928 and had two daughters, Shirley (Jennings) Watson and Claire (Jennings) Dewing. Together with his wife and daughter Claire, he was aboard the MS Lakonia, a Greek-owned cruise ship, when it caught fire and sank north of Madeira on 22 December 1963, with the loss of 128 lives.

== Constitutional law ==
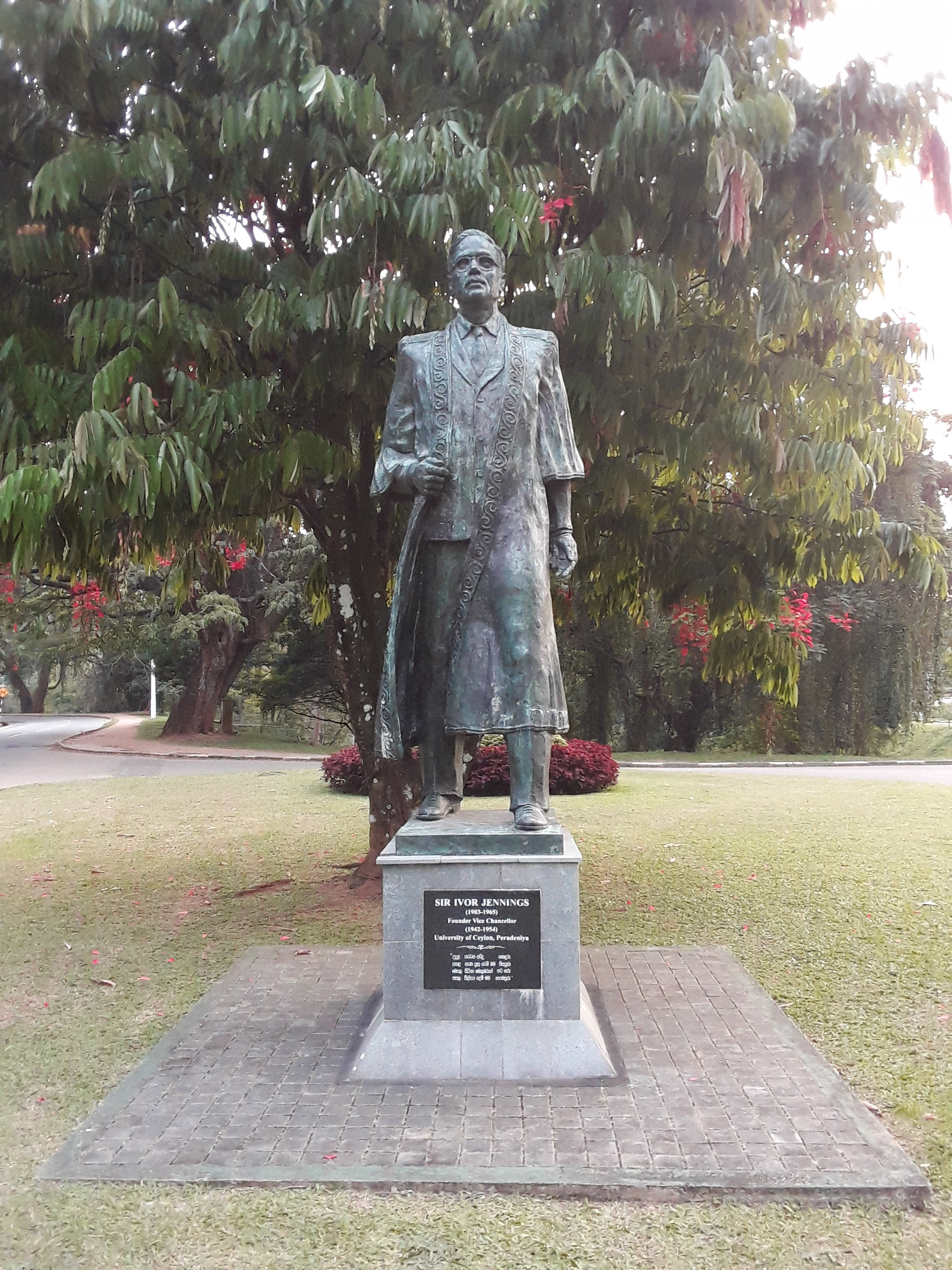
Sir Ivor Jennings Statue at Peradeniya

Jennings was an authority on constitutional law and is author of a definitive book on the workings of the then British constitution. He advised D. S. Senanayake in drafting the Constitution of Ceylon to form the Dominion of Ceylon. He then served as constitutional adviser to the Government of Pakistan.

He was a member of the Reid Commission from June 1956 to 1957, which was responsible for drafting the Constitution of the Federation of Malaya (now Malaysia).

In 1959, he was an advisor to the committee to draft the constitution of Nepal, which was named "Constitution of the Kingdom of Nepal, 1959."

== Partial bibliography ==
- Constitutional Laws of the British Empire (1938), later reissued as Constitutional Laws of the Commonwealth (1957)
- Parliament (1939)
- A Federation for Western Europe (1940)
- The British Constitution (1st Ed. 1941, 3rd Ed. 1950, 5th Ed. 1966)
- Party Politics (1955)
- The Approach to Self-Government (1956)
- The Law and the Constitution (5th Ed. 1959)
- Principles of Local Government Law (4th Ed. 1960)
- The British Commonwealth of Nations (1st Ed. 1948, 2nd Ed. 1954, 3rd. Ed. 1956, 4th Revised Ed. 1961)
- Cabinet Government (3rd Ed. 1965)
- The Road to Peradeniya: An Autobiography (posthumously published, 2008)

== See also ==
- University of Ceylon
- List of Vice-Chancellors of the University of Cambridge
- College House: The Cradle of Sri Lanka's University Education (2021) Edited by Sandagomi Coperahewa & Shravika Amarasekera. Published by University of Colombo.

Academic offices
Preceded by None	Vice Chancellor of the University of Ceylon; 1942–1945	Succeeded by Sir Nicholas Attygalle
Preceded by Henry Roy Dean	Master of Trinity Hall, Cambridge; 1955–1965	Succeeded by William Alexander Deer
Preceded by Herbert Butterfield	Vice-Chancellor of the University of Cambridge; 1961–1963	Succeeded by John Sandwith Boys Smith
