= Kusuma Karunaratne =

Sri Lankan academic

Kusuma Karunaratne (née Ediriweera Jayasooriya; born November 21, 1940) is a Sri Lankan academic, university administrator, Professor and scholar of Sinhalese language and literature.

== Personal life ==
Kusuma Jayasooriya was born on November 21, 1940, at Dickwella, Dodampahala to a business family of Mr. and Mrs. D. E. Jayasooriya. She had her school education at Dodampahala Vidyalaya and then at Vijitha Vidyalaya, Dickwella. She completed her undergraduate education at the University of Ceylon in the Peradeniya campus; there in 1964, she became the first female student in her discipline to earn a First class honours degree from that institution. She later married Samarajeewa Karunaratne, an engineer by profession. They have two sons, Savant Karunaratne and Passant Karunaratne, both electrical engineers specializing in Graphics and Image/Video Processing. The elder, Savant Karunaratne, has a Ph.D. in Electrical and Computer Engineering from the University of Sydney, Australia. The younger, Passant Karunaratne, has a Ph.D. in Electrical Engineering and Computer Science from Northwestern University, in the United States.

== Academic career ==
An academic career began with her appointment as an assistant lecturer of the Department of Sinhala at the University of Ceylon. In 1967, Mrs. Karunaratne and her husband traveled to the United Kingdom where both furthered their education with post-graduate studies, with her studying Sociology of Literature at the University of Essex. Later she pursued graduate studies at the School of Oriental and African Studies in London. She was awarded her doctorate from the University of Colombo.

Karunaratne became the first female lecturer in the Sinhala Department at the University of Columbo, and later went on to become the first female Professor of Sinhala and the first woman to head that department. Professor Karunaratne would later go on to become the Dean and the Acting Vice-Chancellor of the University of Colombo.

During her career she has taught Sinhala to many Japanese, including professors and diplomats, thus helping to strengthen the relations between Japan and Sri Lanka. She has translated many English and Japanese novels to Sinhala. For the distinguished service rendered to Japan in the areas of Japanese literature and culture, and international relations between her home country and Japan, she was honored with the Order of the Rising by the Emperor of Japan in 2011.

== Publications ==
- A Glimpse of Japanese Culture
- Selected Sri Lankan Short Stories, Vol. I & Vol. II., co-authored (with Sarath Wijesooriya), published by Godage Publishing ISBN 955-20-6238-1, ISBN 955-20-6239-X
- English-Sinhalese translation of Hemingway's The Sun Also Rises

== Honors and awards ==
- Ruhunu Putra Award
- Liya Waruna Award
- Fulbright, Fellow.
- Japan Foundation, Fellow.
- Order of the Rising Sun, Gold Rays and Neck Ribbon
