= K. N. Seneviratne =

Sri Lankan academic and physician, founder of Postgraduate Institute of Medicine

Kirthi Nissanka Seneviratne (22 November 1929 – 10 August 1986) was a Sri Lankan academic and physician. He was a Professor of Physiology and founding director of Sri Lanka's Postgraduate Institute of Medicine.

He was educated at the Royal College, Colombo, where he won the Arunachchalam Prize, and graduated with a MBBS with honours in 1954 from the University of Ceylon, Colombo and went on to gain his PhD from the University of Edinburgh. His brother, Nihal, was a former Secretary General of Parliament.

Joining the academic staff of the University of Ceylon's Medical Faculty in 1957 as a demonstrator, he went on to become a Professor of Physiology. In 1974 he established the Institute of Postgraduate Medicine, which later became the Postgraduate Institute of Medicine. He was also a reservist Captain in the Sri Lanka Army.

== See also ==
- University of Ceylon
