= M. J. Perera =

Sri Lankan civil servant (1915–2002)

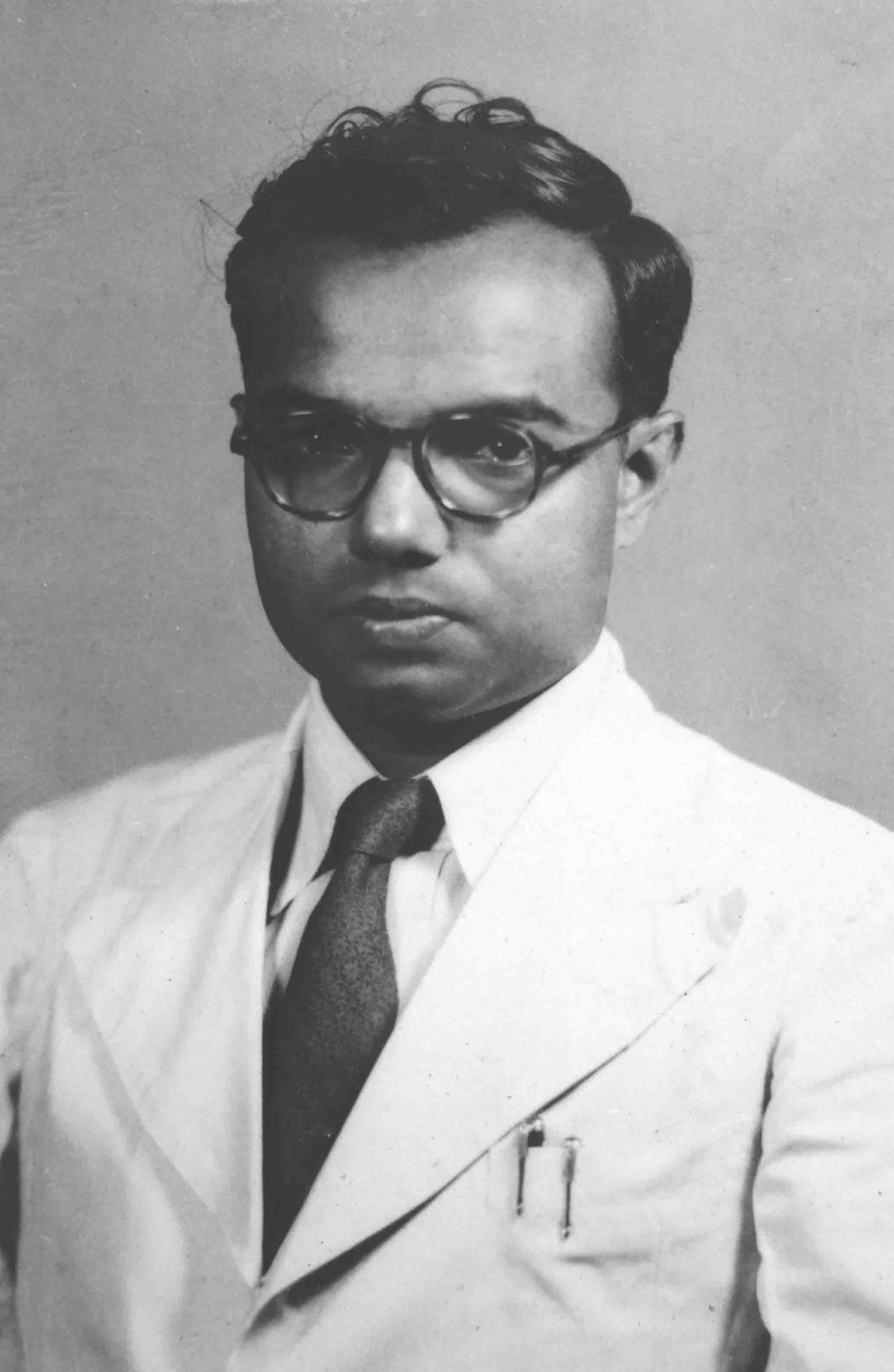
- Born: Mapatunage James Perera; 3 February 1915; Padukka, Sri Lanka
- Died: 14 March 2002 (aged 87)
- Education: Government Bilingual School, Padukka (currently M.D.H. Jayawardena Kanishta Vidyalaya), from 1920 Government Anglo-Vernacular Bilingual School, Padukka Town and Nalanda College, Colombo
- Occupation: Education / Broadcasting / Television executive
- Employer: The Government of Sri Lanka
- Known for: The first Ceylonese Director-General of Radio Ceylon first Chairman of the Sri Lanka Rupavahini Corporation
- Predecessor: John Lampson, Director-General, Radio Ceylon
- Spouse: Gnathie Ratna

Mapatunage James "M. J." Perera (3 February 1915 – 14 March 2002) was a Sri Lankan civil servant with nine members in his family in Udumulla, Padukka. He created broadcasting history by being the first Ceylonese Director General of Radio Ceylon, the oldest radio station in South Asia, taking over the helm from John Lampson of the BBC.

Perera witnessed the transformation of Radio Ceylon as King of the Airwaves in South Asia the radio station was the market leader and the number one radio station in the region during the 1950s and 1960s, with a loyal base of millions of listeners. Radio Ceylon enjoyed huge success under his leadership.

Clifford Dodd, an Australian administrator, was appointed (via the Colombo Plan) as the first Director of the Commercial Service of Radio Ceylon and he contributed to the station's popularity across the Indian sub-continent.

Perera was also appointed the first Chairman of the Sri Lanka Rupavahini Corporation, the island's television station and the country's first competent authority.

== Early life ==
Perera was born on 3 February 1915 in Udumulla, Padukka, in a family of nine. He was educated from 1918 at Rajabisheka Vidyalaya (Primary education) – Padukka, from 1920 at Government Anglo-Vernacular Bilingual School in Padukka town, from 1928 at Nalanda College Colombo and at the University of Ceylon. He became an assistant Government Agent and went on to become the Permanent Secretary of the Education and Cultural Affairs Ministry and later as first Chairman of the Rupavahini (Television) Corporation, retiring from the Sri Lanka Administrative Service after 48 years public service. He had also been the founder Chairman of The Paddy Marketing Board from 1972 to 1977 during which time he changed grain buying and storage from Bushel-Volume system to Metric-Weight system.

== Civil Service Career ==
- Director-General of Radio Ceylon,
- First Chairman of the Sri Lanka Rupavahini Corporation
- Founder Chairman of Paddy Marketing Board
- Permanent Secretary, Ministry of Education
- Chairman National Library Services Board
- Chairman State Fertilizer Manufacturing Corporation
- Chairman River Valley Development Board
- Vice Chancellor University of Peradeniya
- Director Cultural Affairs

Desabandu Mr.M.J.Perera

Curriculum Vitae

Born – 3 February 1915 at Padukka

Student Career

Attended Government Bilingual School, Padukka from 1918 -1920 (Later renamed as Rajabhisheka Kanishta Vidyalaya and currently M.D.H. Jayawardena Kanishta Vidyalaya., Government Anglo-Vernacular Bilingual school in Padukka town from 1920 – 1927. Passed B.S.L.C. and E.S.L.C. in 1st Division. Entered Nalanda College, Colombo – in 1928 to 1932. Cambridge Senior 1st Division with exemption from London Matriculation twice as underage to enter University first time. Entered Ceylon University College 1933, Intermediate in Arts (London) 1939 with Pali, Sanskrit, English and Logic. Bachelor of Arts (University of London) Indo-Aryan (Hons.) 1st Class in 1936, Honours Course covered in 2 years. Won Government Scholarship and joined London School of Oriental Studies and studied under Professor Turner, Dr. Stede and Mr. Rylands for a post-graduate course but interrupted studies and returned to Ceylon on passing the Ceylon Civil Service Examination in 1938 getting 3rd place in order of merit in the whole examination. (1st place in the written papers.)

Professional career as Member of the C.C.S. and later C.A.S.

- 1939 January – Cadet, Galle Kachcheri and Matara Kachcheri, Additional Magistrate, Matara
- 1940 – Cadet, Hambanthota Kachcheri and Additional Magistrate, Hambanthota.
- 1941 – Assistant Land Settlement Officer.
- 1942 – Assistant Government Agent, Trincomalee (Covering war emergency duties)
- 1944 – Assistant Land Commissioner and Additional Assistant Government Agent, Anuradhapura
- 1945 – Assistant Government Agent (Emergency), Mathugama.
- 1945 – Administrative Secretary (Present designation of post of Deputy Director Administration), Department of Agriculture, Peradeniya.
- 1948 – Administrative Secretary, Irrigation Department.
- 1949 – Assistant Secretary, Ministry of Agriculture and Lands.
- 1952 – Director-General of Broadcasting.
- 1955 – Director-General of Broadcasting and in addition, Commissioner, Department of Swabasha (Set up for the first time to publish Sinhala and Tamil Text Books.)
- 1956 – Deputy Commissioner of Official Language Department (by amalgamation of Swabasha Department with Official Language Department under special Commissioner.)
- 1957 – Deputy Commissioner of Official Language Department and Director Information.
- 1959 – Deputy Commissioner of Official Language Department and Acting Director of Cultural Affairs,
- 1960 – On leave Abroad.
- 1960 – On return Director of Cultural Affaires and Acting Director, Government College of Fine Arts.
- 1962 – Senior Assistant Secretary, Ministry of Home, Industries and Cultural Affairs.
- 1963 – Senior Assistant Secretary, Ministry of Education.
- 1963 – Chairman of initial committee appointed to draft bill of Parliament for the establishment of National Science Council.
- 1963 – 1968 – Permanent Secretary, Ministry of Education and Cultural Affaires.
- Member of the Ceylon Civil Service from 1939 – 1968
- 1968 – March 1969 – Vice-Chancellor, University of Ceylon – Peradeniya.
- 1969 – Chairman River Valleys Development Board.
- 1970 – Chairman State Fertilizer Manufacturing Corporation.
- 1971 – 1977 – Chairman (Founder) – Paddy Marketing Board.
- 1977 – 1980 – Member of Governing Council / Associate Director – Sri Lanka Centre for Development Studies.
- 1981 – 1982 – Chairman – National Library Services Board.
- 1981 – 1987 – Member of the Board of Independent Television Network (ITN) of Government of Sri Lanka
- 1982 – 1987 – Founder Chairman Sri Lanka Rupavahini (Television) Corporation.
- 1984 – 1987 – Member of the Board of Sri Lanka Television Training Institute
- 1989 – 2000 – Member of the Board of Management of the Postgraduate Institute of Pali and Buddhist Studies
- 1995 – 2000 – Member of the Council, University of Kelaniya

Extra functions of Importance

1959 – 1963– President, Arts Council of Ceylon. Member and Executive Committee member, Sri Lanka Sahithya Manadalaya. 1960 – 1962 – Founder and President of the National Theatre Trust. 1960 – 1968 – Ex – officio member and later Chairman, National Book Trust. 1963 – 1968 – Chairman, National Commission of UNESCO in Ceylon (ex-officio). 1964 – 1968 – Chairman, Public Performance Board (Film and Stage Censor Board). 1966 – 1968 – Member, United States Educational Foundation in Ceylon. 1966 – 1968 – Member, National Council of Higher Education. 1991 – – Founder member of Sri Lanka Association for the Advancement of Education. Later President. The name for this Association (SLAAED) has been proposed by him.

Special Functions

- 1962 – 1966 – Member of the Vidyodaya University Council appointed by the Chancellor.
- 1964 – 1966 – Member of the Vidyalankara University Council appointed by the Chancellor.
- 1963 – 1966 – Elected Member, Senate of the University of Ceylon.
- 1966 – Member of the Steering Committee of the UNESCO Cultural Triangle – Polonnaruwa Project. Served as an advisor and Coordinator and closely involved with conservation work of Alahana Pirivena, Tivanka Pilimage, Gal Vihara, Lankathilaka.

Attended many international conferences in Ceylon and abroad; Leader, Ceylon Delegation to the 1st Commonwealth Broadcasting Conference; Leader, Ceylon Delegation to 13th General Conference, UNESCO; Invited to seminar by Brookings Institution, Washington; Chairman or Member of various Government Committees, Particular mention may be made of Official Language Policy Implementation (1962). Revision of CAS Minute (1964). Advisory Committee on Academy of Administrative Studies; Chairman, Manpower and Education Committee of the Ministry of Planning (1965). 1967 December – Competent Authority under section 86 of the Higher Education Act for the University of Colombo and Vidyalankara University.

Publication

A number of essays, articles and reviews published in Journals on literary, cultural and religious subjects both in English and Sinhala. Creator of the Sinhala word Rupavahini to the Sinhala vocabulary to identify the English word "Television" in 1954 at the Sandeshaya Programme of the BBC while participating at the Commonwealth Broadcasting Association meeting in London. Creator of the Magazine "Tharangani" for Broadcasting at Radio Ceylon.

=== Religion and Culture ===
1948 – 2002 – Life member of Young Men’s Buddhist Association. (YMBA) 1952 – 2002 – Founder member of German Dharmadutha Society. 1952 – – Vice President German Dharmadutha Society 1966 – April 2000 – Member of the Board of Trustees German Dharmadutha Society

=== Awards ===
1992 – Nalanda Puthra Abhinandana Award – Service to the nation. awarded by alma mater Nalanda College, Colombo.

– Independent Television Network Sri Lanka award for contribution to Television Media.

1996 – Vishva Prasadhini Award. Conferred by the Honourable Prime Minister of Sri Lanka Mrs. Sirimavo Bandaranaike felicitation award for the field of Administration. 1996 – Award presented by Sri Lanka Rupavahini Corporation in appreciation of being the pioneer of the new social media service and the development of a very special identity and tradition for it. 1997 – Award for the contribution to Sri Lanka Librarianship. Presented by Sri Lanka Library Association. 1998 – Presidential (National) Award of Desabandu title conferred by Her Excellency the President of Sri Lanka for excellent Administrative Capabilities. 1999 – Hideo Shimizu Foundation Sri Lanka – Award for the excellent contribution towards the overall development of media policy planning in Sri Lanka. 2000 – Award presented by the University of Kelaniya in appreciation of the invaluable service rendered for a period over 30 years to University of Kelaniya in the capacity of Secretary, Ministry of Education, Competent Authority of the Vidyalankara University and Member of the Council of the University of Kelaniya. 2001 – Golden Award for older persons presented by Helpage Sri Lanka for excellence in Public Administration. 2004 – Award in appreciation of the distinguished and dedicated service rendered to the cause of Education in Sri Lanka. Presented by Sri Lanka Association for the Advancement of Education. 2012 – Felicitation award for the contribution for the Sri Lankan creative Literary work and for bringing glory to the Sri Lanka Administrative Service. Award presented by Sri Lanka Administrative Service Association.

== See also ==
- Radio Ceylon
- Sri Lanka Broadcasting Corporation
- Nalanda College Colombo
