= Battle of Petersburg order of battle =

Battle of Petersburg order of battle may refer to:

- Siege of Petersburg order of battle, for the Richmond–Petersburg campaign in general
  - Forces at the First Battle of Petersburg
  - Second Battle of Petersburg order of battle
  - Third Battle of Petersburg order of battle, the same as the Appomattox campaign order of battle

== See also ==
- Battle of Petersburg (disambiguation)
