= Duttaphrynus silentvalleyensis =

Conservation status
- Data Deficient (IUCN 3.1)

Scientific classification
- Kingdom: Animalia
- Phylum: Chordata
- Class: Amphibia
- Order: Anura
- Family: Bufonidae
- Genus: Duttaphrynus
- Species: D. silentvalleyensis

Binomial name
- Duttaphrynus silentvalleyensis (Pillai, 1981)

Synonyms
- Bufo silentvalleyensis Pillai, 1981

Species of amphibian

Duttaphrynus silentvalleyensis, also known as the Silent Valley toad or South Indian hill toad, is a species of toad endemic to Kerala, southern India. The type specimen was collected near or in the Silent Valley National Park. It may be a synonym of Duttaphrynus parietalis.
