= Acela Corridor =

Acela Corridor may refer to:

- Northeast Corridor, a train line for Amtrak's Acela trains
- Northeast megalopolis, the megalopolis of cities from Boston to Washington that the Acela train serves
