= Arjuna de Silva =

Academic and Consultant Physician

Senior Professor Arjuna de Silva FRCP
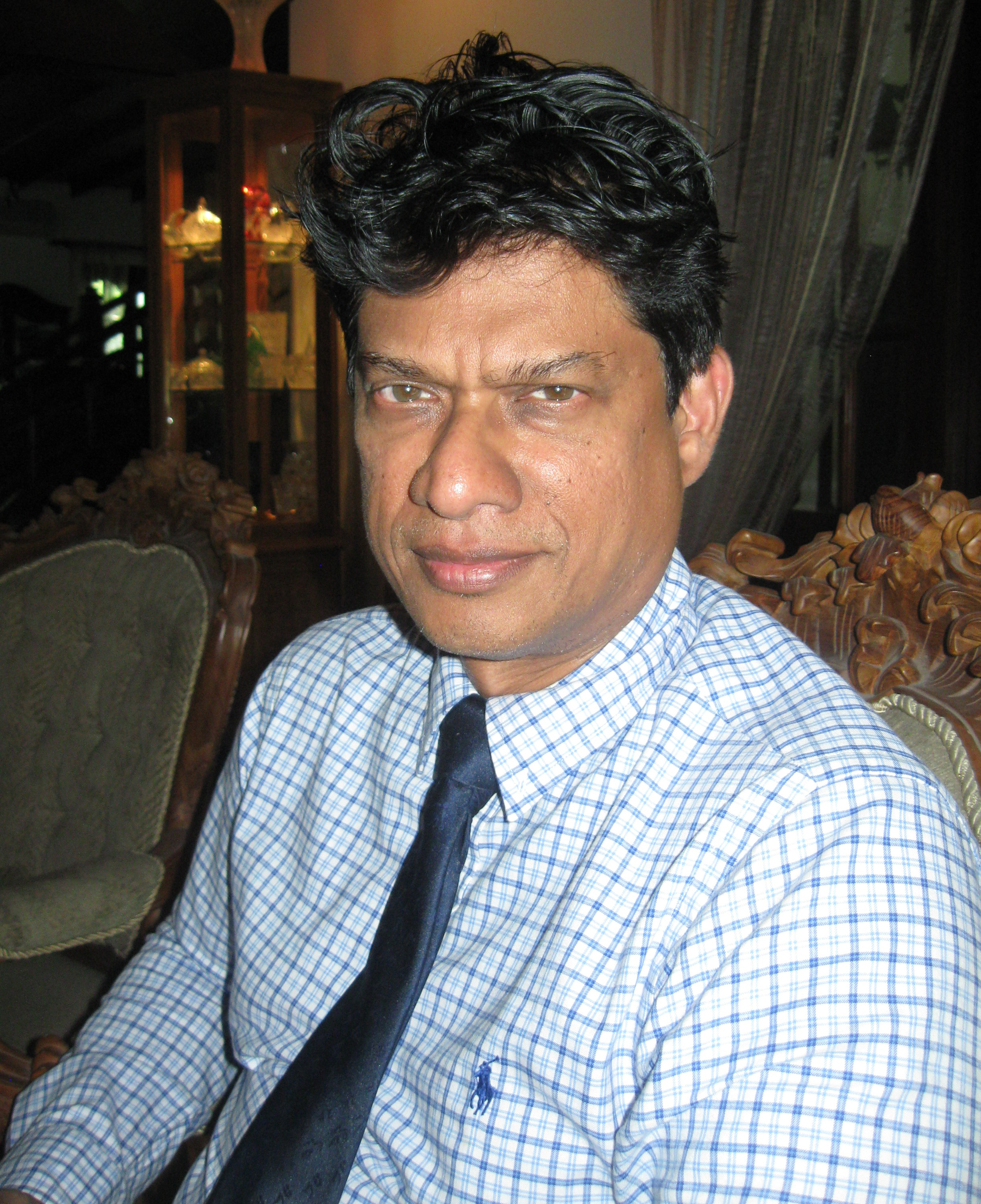

Personal details
- Born: 13 June 1965 (age 60)
- Spouse: Thulani Weerakoon
- Education: Green College, University of Oxford; Royal College of Physicians United Kingdom; Postgraduate Institute of Medicine, University of Colombo; North Colombo Medical College (NCMC); S. Thomas' College, Mount Lavinia
- Profession: Academic and consultant physician

Arjuna Priyadarsin de Silva (born 13 June 1965) is a Sri Lankan Academic and Consultant Gastroenterologist. He is the Head of the Department of Medicine, Faculty of Medicine University of Kelaniya and Chairman of the Sri Lanka Anti-Doping Agency (SLADA).

De Silva practices as a Consultant Physician at Colombo North Teaching Hospital and is a Board Certified trainer in Gastroenterology in Sri Lanka. He is the Chairman of the Sri Lankan Board of Study in Gastroenterology, member of the Board of Study in Medicine and is a Council Member of the National Institute of Education, the governing body vested with the administration, management and control of the affairs of national education. De Silva is also a member of the Board of study in Sports Medicine and council member of Sri Lanka National Sports Council. He is an associate editor of the World Journal of Gastroenterology.

== Education ==
De Silva was educated at S. Thomas' College, Mount Lavinia, where he had won sports colours and was a senior prefect. He was the captain of the S. Thomas' College's rowing team and represented Sri Lanka in rowing 1983-1984. De Silva entered North Colombo Medical College from where he graduated with Bachelor of Medicine and Bachelor of Surgery degree. He subsequently obtained a postgraduate Doctor of Medicine 1st in Order of Merit from the Postgraduate Institute of Medicine, University of Colombo (1997-1999). In 2001, he obtained an MSc from the University of Oxford.

== Professional career ==
De Silva was Board Certified in Sri Lanka as a Specialist in General Medicine in 1999. He has practised as a Registrar in Gastroenterology and Research Fellow at Radcliffe Infirmary Oxford during his professional training. In 2001 he was awarded MRCP from the Royal College of Physicians London. De Silva was subsequently appointed Consultant Physician (Resident Physician) at the National Hospital of Sri Lanka. He has also worked at the Ampara Hospital as a Consultant Physician. In 2008, de Silva was appointed a Board Certified as a trainer in Gastroenterology. He was awarded FCCP 2009 and became a Fellow of the Royal College of Physicians (FRCP, London) in 2010.

De Silva is a Professor in Medicine at the Faculty of Medicine, University of Kelaniya and has previously held the positions of Senior Lecturer in Medicine and Clinical Coordinator at the same university. He was appointed Head, Department of Medicine, Faculty of Medicine, University of Kelaniya in 2013. De Silva currently holds several advisory positions for the Government of Sri Lanka and is the Chairman of the Sri Lanka Anti-Doping Agency (SLADA). He was formerly the Director General Institute of Sports Medicine Sri Lanka.

== Sports medicine ==
De Silva has been at the forefront in the development of Sports Medicine in Sri Lanka. He was the Director General of Institute of Sports Medicine from 2011-2013. He has played a leading role in establishing SLADA and introducing new legislation to criminalize trafficking in banned substances. Sri Lanka is among few countries in Asia to have legislation to this effect. De Silva was the medical provider for the 20/20 Cricket World Cup hosted by Sri Lanka in 2012 and is currently an advisor to the Sri Lanka Cricket Board. He was also the official physician to the Sri Lankan Olympic team at the 2012 London Olympics.

== Research ==
De Silva has won Presidential Research Awards in 2006, 2008, 2010 and 2012. He has delivered numerous orations and lectures at national and international scientific meetings. He has authored one book, The Role of TNF polymorphisms in IBD and two book chapters in the field of gastroenterology, by international publishers. His publications also include 38 scientific papers and over 100 published abstracts in international scientific journals.

== Honours and awards ==
- Vice Chancellors Award for the most outstanding researcher in Medicine 2014
- Presidential Research Award 2006, 2008, 2010, 2012
- National Research council, Colombo 2001, 2010
- Vice Chancellors Award for the most outstanding researcher in Medicine 2010
- Wijerama Award for best research paper 2010, Sri Lanka Medical Association Annual Sessions, Colombo 2010
- Sir Markus Fernando Oration Medal, Sri Lanka Medical Association 2008
- Sir Markus Fernando Oration Medal, Sri Lanka Medical Association 2003
- National Science Foundation Research Grant (2004)
- Vidya Jyothi - 2018 Sri Lankan national honour awarded "for outstanding scientific and technological achievements"
