= Northeast megalopolis =

Megaregion of the United States

Coordinates: 41°N 74°W

- Megaregion of the United States
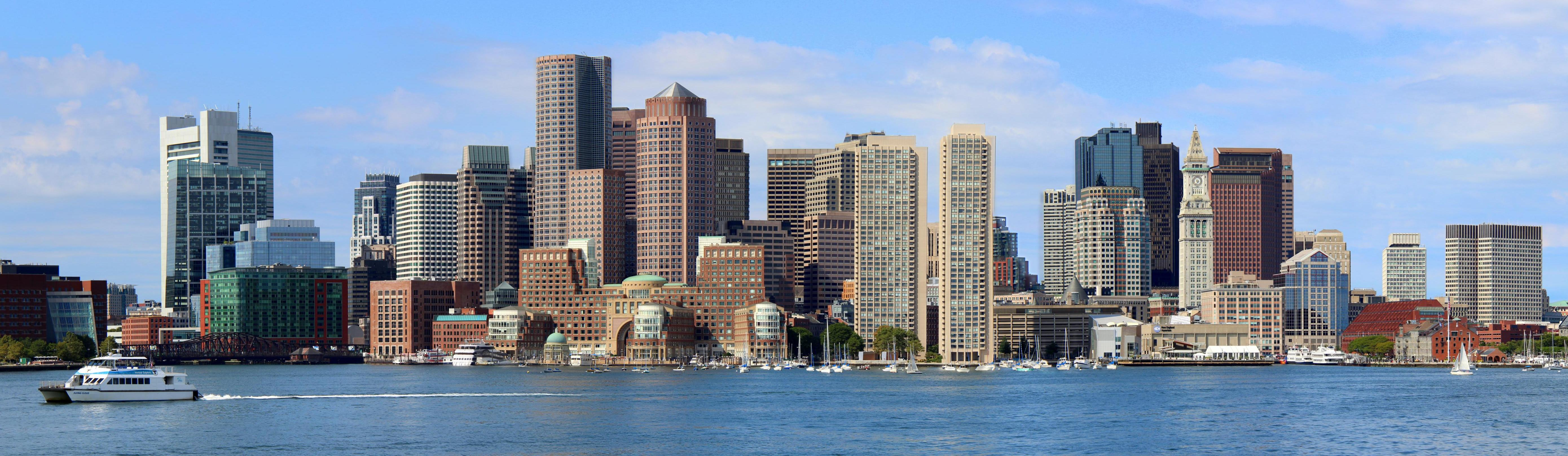
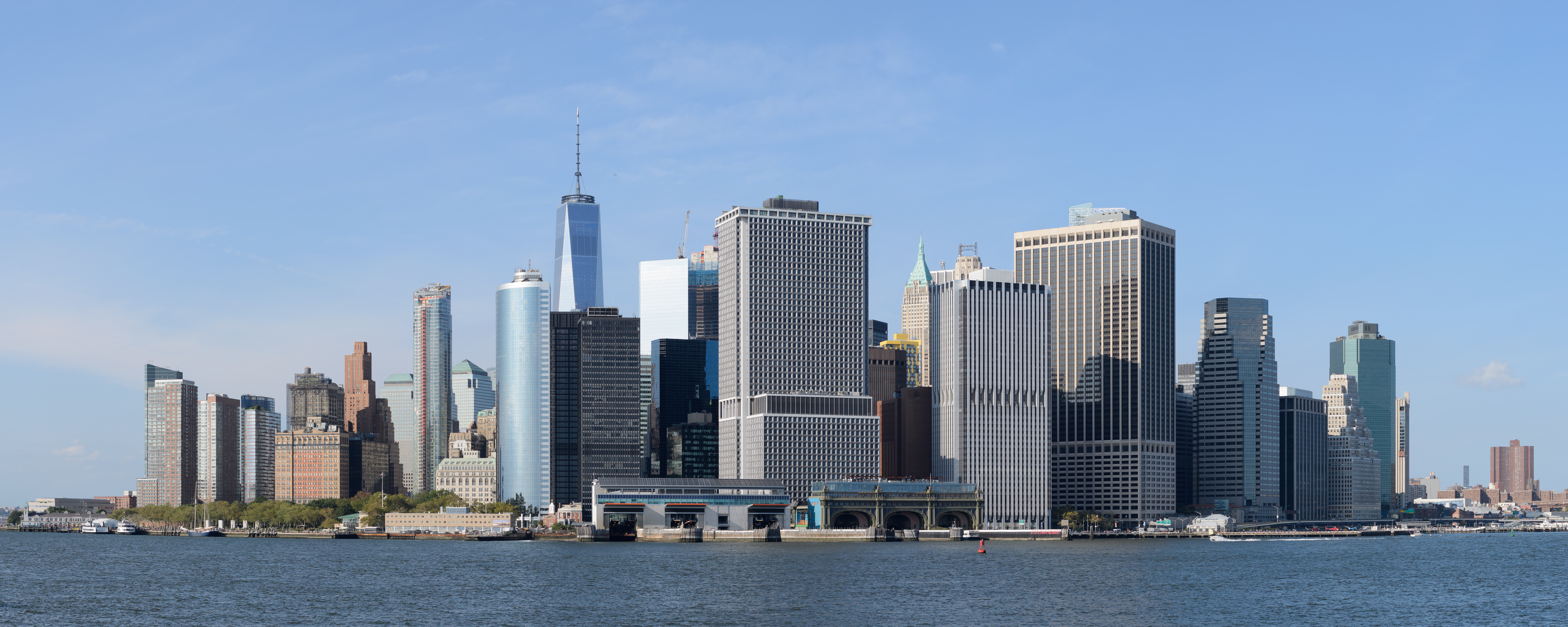
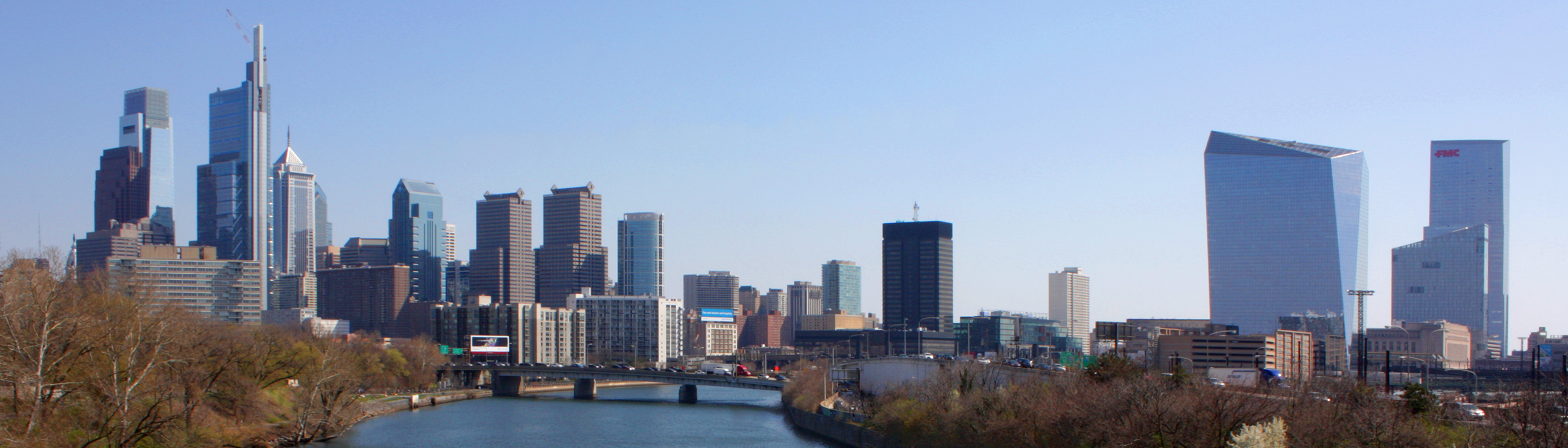
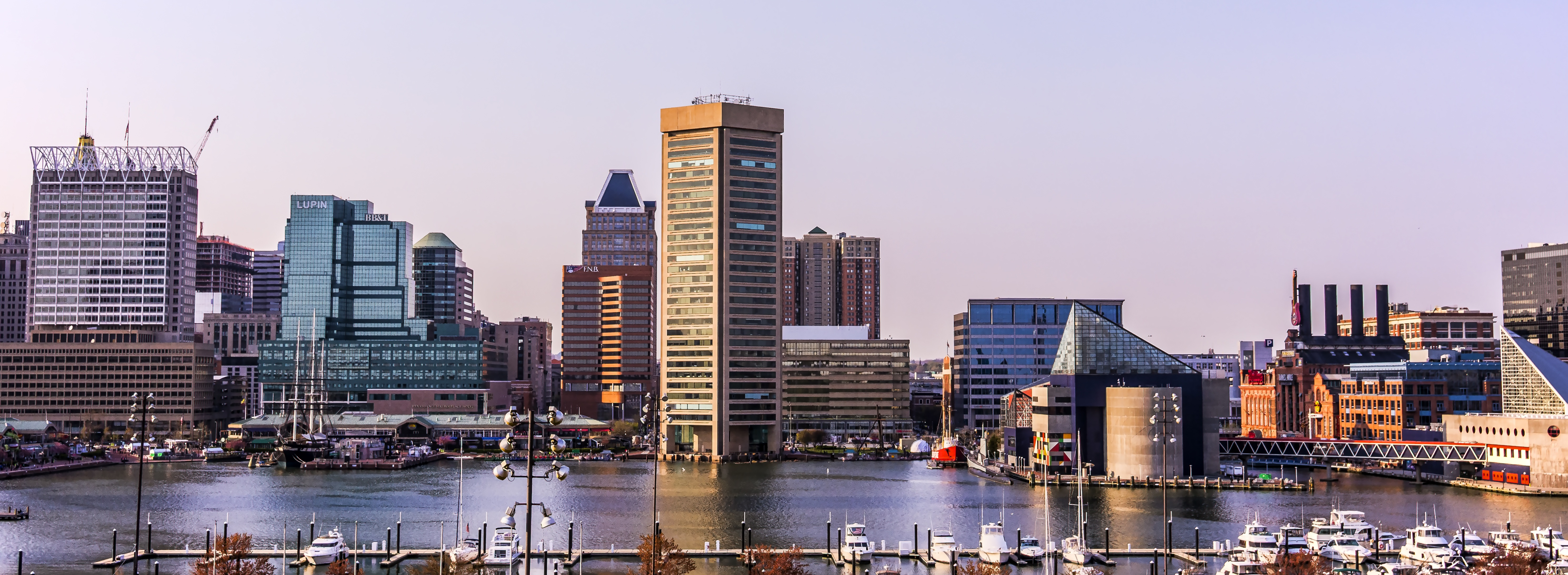
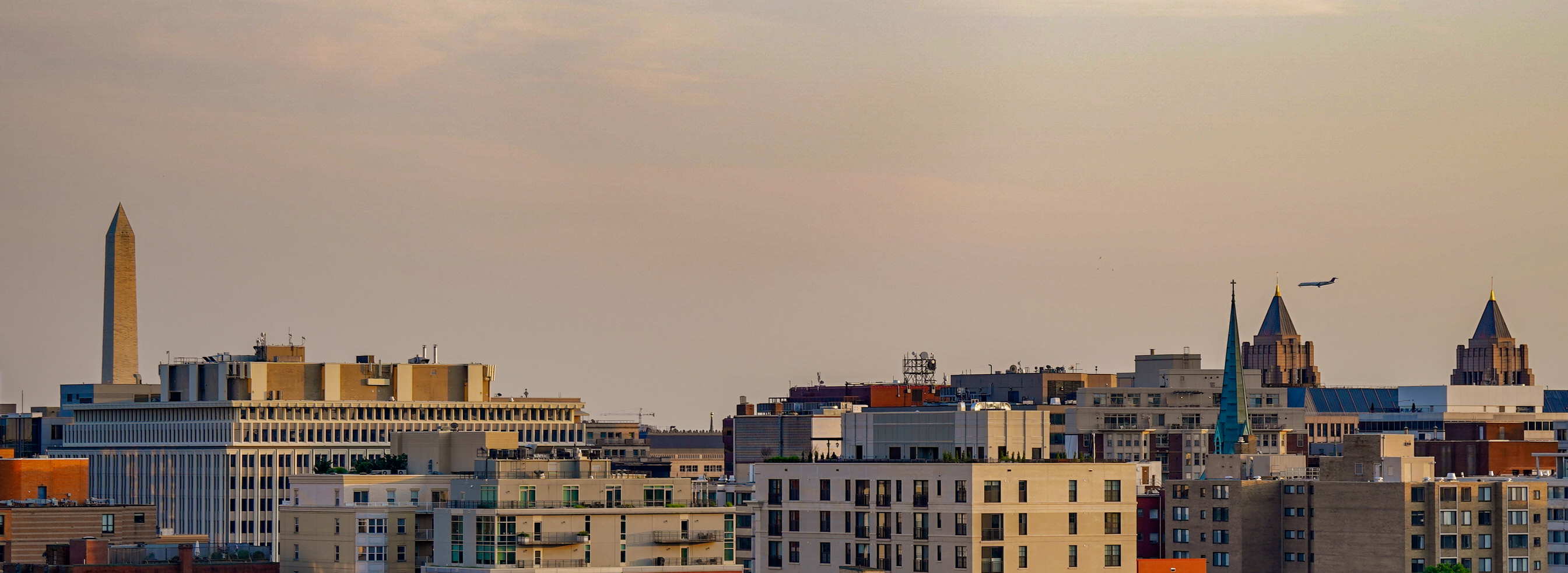
- Largest cities of the Northeast megalopolis (from top to bottom): Boston, New York City, Philadelphia, Baltimore, and Washington, D.C.
- Nicknames: Northeast corridor, BosWash, Boston–Washington corridor, Eastern Seaboard, Atlantic Seaboard
Interactive map of the Northeast megalopolis
Core combined statistical areas (CSAs)
Boston–Worcester–Providence, MA–RI–NH
New Haven–Hartford–Waterbury, CT CSA
New York–Newark, NY–NJ–CT–PA CSA
Philadelphia–Camden–Wilmington, PA–NJ–DE–MD
Washington–Baltimore, DC–VA–MD–WV–PA
Outlying metropolitan areas
Allentown–Bethlehem, PA–NJ CSA
Scranton–Wilkes-Barre, PA MSA
Harrisburg–York–Lebanon, PA CSA
Lancaster, PA MSA
Portland–Lewiston, ME CSA
Springfield, MA CSA
Salisbury, MD CSA and Seaford, DE MSA
Richmond, VA MSA
Virginia Beach–Norfolk, VA–NC CSA
Non-metropolitan counties in the megaregion
- Country: United States
- States: List: New York; New Jersey; Virginia; Maryland; Massachusetts; Connecticut; Pennsylvania; Rhode Island; Delaware; New Hampshire; Maine; West Virginia; North Carolina
- Federal districts: Washington, D.C.
- Largest city: New York City (8,804,190)

Area
  - Total: 56,200 sq mi (146,000 km^{2})

Population (2024)
  - Total: 53,141,158
  - Density: 946/sq mi (365/km^{2})

GDP
  - Total: $5.229 trillion (2022)
  - Per capita: $104,106 (2022)

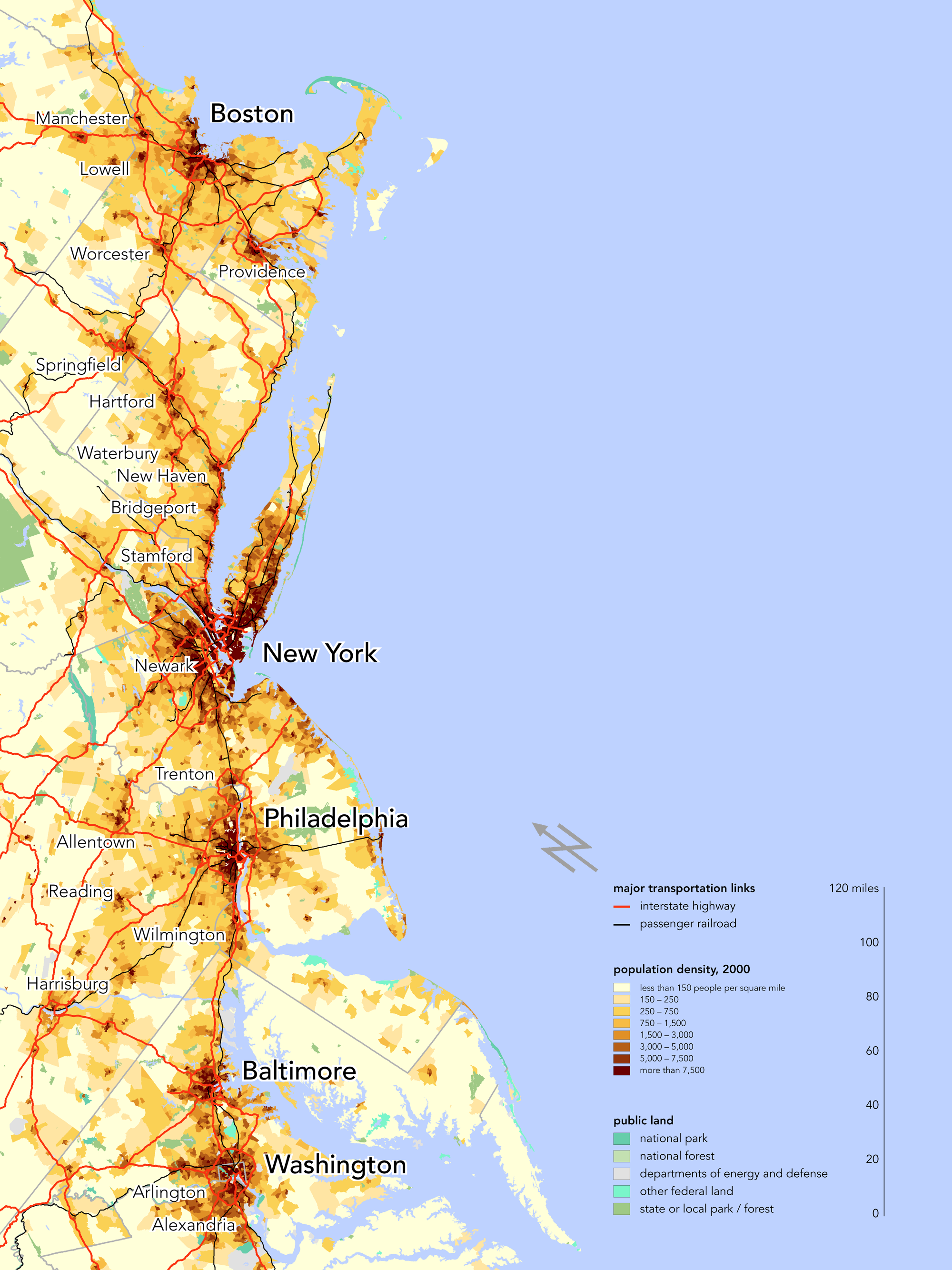
Population density in the Northeast megalopolis on the Atlantic seaboard

The Northeast megalopolis, also known as the Northeast Corridor, Acela Corridor, Boston–Washington corridor, BosWash, Bos–Wash corridor or BosNYWash, is the most populous megalopolis exclusively within the United States, with slightly over 53 million residents as of 2024. The nickname "BosWash" for the region was first used by futurist Herman Kahn in a 1967 essay. It is the world's largest megalopolis by economic output.

Located primarily on the Atlantic Coast in the Northeastern United States, the megalopolis extends from the northern suburbs of Boston to Washington, D.C., running roughly southwesterly along a section of U.S. Route 1, Interstate 95, and the Northeast Corridor train line. It is sometimes defined more broadly to include other urban regions, including the Richmond and Hampton Roads regions to the south; Portland, Maine, and Manchester, New Hampshire, to the north; and Harrisburg, Pennsylvania, to the west. The coastal waters of the Northeast megalopolis constitute one of the fastest-warming urban ocean shorelines in the world.

The region includes many of the nation's most populated metropolitan areas, including those of New York City, Philadelphia, Washington, D.C., Boston, and Baltimore. As of 2024, it contained more than 53 million people, about 15% of the U.S. population on less than 2% of the nation's land area, with a population density of about 946 people per square mile (365 people/km^{2}), far more than the U.S. average of 80.5 per square mile (31 people/km^{2}). At least one projection estimates the area will grow to 58.1 million people by 2050.

Before the term megalopolis became widely used, Walter Hedden identified the growing interdependence of large cities in the Northeast in his 1929 book, specifically regarding the sourcing of milk. French geographer Jean Gottmann then popularized the term megalopolis in his 1961 study of the region, Megalopolis: The Urbanized Northeastern Seaboard of the United States. Gottmann concluded that the region's cities, while discrete and independent, are uniquely tied to each other through the intermeshing of their suburban zones, taking on some characteristics of a single, massive city: a megalopolis, a term he co-opted from an ancient Greek town of the same name that named itself out of aspirations to become the largest Greek city.

== Region ==
The Northeast megalopolis includes many of the financial and political centers of influence in the United States, including the national capital of Washington, D.C., and all or part of 12 states (from north to south): Maine, New Hampshire, Massachusetts, Rhode Island, Connecticut, New York, New Jersey, Pennsylvania, Delaware, Maryland, West Virginia, and Virginia. Of all the states that traditionally make up the American Northeast, only rural, landlocked and very rugged Vermont is considered to be distinct from the more populated coastal states of the megalopolis, while Maryland and Virginia are integral to the corridor, despite being in the Southern United States. All major cities of the megalopolis are linked by Interstate 95 and U.S. Route 1, which start in Miami and Key West, Florida, respectively, in the south, and terminate in Maine at the U.S.-Canadian border. It is also linked by the Northeast Corridor train line, the country's busiest passenger rail line, serving Amtrak and several commuter rail agencies. The development of the interconnected urban corridor in the Northeast initially followed the strategic placement of these rail lines, forming a "railroad spine" before the expansion of the highway systems (such as I-95 and Route 1) and overlapping suburban areas.

As of 2019, the region is home to 52.3 million people, and its metropolitan statistical areas are contiguous from Washington, D.C., in the south to Boston in the north. The region is not uniformly populated between the terminal cities, and there are regions nominally within the corridor yet located away from the main transit lines that have been bypassed by urbanization, such as the Quiet Corner in Connecticut.

The region accounts for over 20% of the U.S. gross domestic product. It is home to two of the world's largest stock exchanges, the New York Stock Exchange and Nasdaq, and the headquarters of the United Nations in New York City, and the executive, legislative, and judicial centers of the U.S. federal government, the White House, the U.S. Capitol, and the U.S. Supreme Court in Washington, D.C. The region also is home to the headquarters of most of the nation's and some of the world's largest media organizations, including ABC, NBC, CBS, NPR, PBS, Fox, Comcast, The New York Times Company, USA Today, the New York Post, The Wall Street Journal, Newsday, The Washington Post, and The Boston Globe.

The global headquarters of many major financial firms, including JPMorgan Chase, Citigroup, Goldman Sachs, Morgan Stanley, Fannie Mae, Freddie Mac, Capital One, The Vanguard Group, and Fidelity, are located in the region. Among the world's 500 largest companies, 54 are based in the Northeast megalopolis. Among the 500 largest U.S.-based companies, 162 are headquartered in the region. The region is the center of the global hedge fund industry, which is heavily based in New York City and the suburban Connecticut cities of Greenwich and Stamford.

The Northeast megalopolis is home to hundreds of colleges and universities, including several that rank among the world's most elite universities, including Harvard and MIT, both in Cambridge, Massachusetts, Brown in Providence, Rhode Island, Yale in New Haven, Connecticut, Columbia in New York City, Princeton in Princeton, New Jersey, the University of Pennsylvania in Philadelphia, Johns Hopkins in Baltimore, and Georgetown in Washington, D.C.

== Population ==
Largest combined statistical areas (CSAs) within the Northeast megalopolis
Rank (U.S.)	Combined statistical area (CSA)	2020 census	2010 census	Change
1	New York–Newark, NY–NJ–CT–PA	22,431,833	22,327,454	+0.47%
3	Washington–Baltimore–Arlington, DC–MD–VA–WV–PA	10,028,331	9,050,192	+10.81%
7	Boston–Worcester–Providence, MA–RI–NH–CT	8,349,768	7,871,570	+6.08%
9	Philadelphia–Reading–Camden, PA–NJ–DE–MD	7,379,700	7,067,807	+4.41%
26	New Haven-Hartford-Waterbury, CT	2,659,617	2,627,399	+1.23%
35	Virginia Beach–Chesapeake, VA–NC	1,857,542	1,779,243	+4.40%
Total		50,047,174	48,096,266	+4.06%

Largest metropolitan statistical areas (MSAs) within the Northeast Megalopolis
2020 Rank	Metropolitan statistical area (MSA)	2020 Census	2010 Census	Change
1	New York–Newark–Jersey City, NY-NJ MSA	20,140,470	18,897,109	+6.58%
2	Washington–Arlington–Alexandria, DC-VA-MD-WV MSA	6,385,162	5,649,540	+13.02%
3	Philadelphia–Camden–Wilmington, PA-NJ-DE-MD MSA	6,245,051	5,965,343	+4.69%
4	Boston–Cambridge–Newton, MA-NH MSA	4,941,632	4,552,402	+8.55%
5	Baltimore–Columbia–Towson, MD MSA	2,844,510	2,710,489	+4.94%
6	Virginia Beach–Chesapeake–Norfolk, VA-NC MSA	1,780,059	1,676,822	+6.16%
7	Providence–Warwick, RI-MA MSA	1,676,579	1,600,852	+4.73%
8	Richmond, VA MSA	1,314,434	1,188,246	+10.62%
9	Hartford–West Hartford–East Hartford, CT MSA	1,213,531	1,212,381	+0.09%
10	Bridgeport–Stamford–Danbury, CT MSA	957,419	916,829	+4.43%
11	New Haven, CT MSA	864,835	862,477	+0.27%
12	Worcester, MA MSA	862,111	798,552	+7.96%
13	Allentown–Bethlehem–Easton, PA-NJ MSA	861,889	821,623	+4.90%
14	Kiryas Joel–Poughkeepsie–Newburgh, NY MSA	679,221	670,301	+1.33%
15	Portland–South Portland, ME MSA	551,740	514,098	+7.32%
16	Springfield, MA MSA	465,825	463,490	+0.50%
17	Waterbury–Shelton, CT MSA	450,376	448,738	+0.37%
18	Reading, PA MSA	428,849	411,442	+4.23%
19	Manchester–Nashua, NH MSA	422,937	400,721	+5.54%
20	Trenton–Princeton, NJ MSA	387,340	366,513	+5.68%
21	Hagerstown–Martinsburg, MD-WV MSA	293,844	269,140	+9.18%
22	Norwich–New London–Willimantic, CT MSA	280,430	290,198	−3.37%
23	Atlantic City–Hammonton, NJ MSA	274,534	274,549	−0.01%
24	Barnstable Town, MA MSA	228,996	215,888	+6.07%
25	Kingston, NY MSA	181,851	182,493	−0.35%
26	Amherst Town–Northampton, MA MSA	162,308	158,080	+2.67%
27	Chambersburg, PA MSA	155,932	149,618	+4.22%
28	Vineland, NJ MSA	154,152	156,898	−1.75%
29	Lexington Park, MD MSA	113,777	105,151	+8.20%

Largest cities in the Northeast megalopolis with populations over 100,000
2020 rank	City/Town	Region	2020 census	2010 census	Change	Land area	2020 population density
1	New York City	New York	8,804,190	8,175,133	+7.69%	301.5 sq mi (781 km^{2})	29,303/sq mi (11,314/km^{2})
2	Philadelphia	Pennsylvania	1,603,797	1,526,006	+5.10%	134.2 sq mi (348 km^{2})	11,937/sq mi (4,609/km^{2})
3	Washington	District of Columbia	689,545	601,723	+14.60%	61.1 sq mi (158 km^{2})	11,281/sq mi (4,356/km^{2})
4	Boston	Massachusetts	675,647	617,594	+9.40%	48.3 sq mi (125 km^{2})	13,977/sq mi (5,397/km^{2})
5	Baltimore	Maryland	585,708	620,961	−5.68%	80.9 sq mi (210 km^{2})	7,235/sq mi (2,793/km^{2})
6	Virginia Beach	Virginia	459,470	437,994	+4.90%	244.7 sq mi (634 km^{2})	1,878/sq mi (725/km^{2})
7	Newark	New Jersey	311,549	277,140	+12.42%	24.1 sq mi (62 km^{2})	12,904/sq mi (4,982/km^{2})
8	Jersey City	New Jersey	292,449	247,549	+18.14%	14.8 sq mi (38 km^{2})	19,835/sq mi (7,658/km^{2})
9	Chesapeake	Virginia	249,422	222,209	+12.25%	338.5 sq mi (877 km^{2})	737/sq mi (285/km^{2})
10	Arlington (Note: County)	Virginia	238,643	207,627	+14.94%	26 sq mi (67 km^{2})	9,200/sq mi (3,600/km^{2})
11	Norfolk	Virginia	238,005	242,803	−1.98%	53.3 sq mi (138 km^{2})	4,468/sq mi (1,725/km^{2})
12	Richmond	Virginia	226,610	204,214	+10.97%	62.6 sq mi (162 km^{2})	3,782/sq mi (1,460/km^{2})
13	Yonkers	New York	211,569	195,976	+7.96%	18.0 sq mi (47 km^{2})	11,750/sq mi (4,540/km^{2})
14	Worcester	Massachusetts	206,518	181,045	+14.07%	37.4 sq mi (97 km^{2})	5,528/sq mi (2,134/km^{2})
15	Providence	Rhode Island	190,934	178,042	+7.24%	18.4 sq mi (48 km^{2})	10,373/sq mi (4,005/km^{2})
16	Newport News	Virginia	186,247	180,719	+3.06%	69.0 sq mi (179 km^{2})	2,700/sq mi (1,000/km^{2})
17	Paterson	New Jersey	159,732	146,199	+9.26%	8.4 sq mi (22 km^{2})	18,986/sq mi (7,331/km^{2})
18	Alexandria	Virginia	159,467	139,966	+13.93%	15.0 sq mi (39 km^{2})	10,681/sq mi (4,124/km^{2})
19	Springfield	Massachusetts	155,929	153,060	+1.87%	31.9 sq mi (83 km^{2})	4,893/sq mi (1,889/km^{2})
20	Bridgeport	Connecticut	148,654	144,229	+3.07%	16.1 sq mi (42 km^{2})	9,290/sq mi (3,590/km^{2})
21	Elizabeth	New Jersey	137,298	124,969	+9.87%	12.3 sq mi (32 km^{2})	11,145/sq mi (4,303/km^{2})
22	Hampton	Virginia	137,148	137,436	−0.21%	51.5 sq mi (133 km^{2})	2,665/sq mi (1,029/km^{2})
23	Stamford	Connecticut	135,470	122,643	+10.46%	37.6 sq mi (97 km^{2})	3,601/sq mi (1,390/km^{2})
24	Lakewood	New Jersey	135,158	92,843	+45.58%	24.7 sq mi (64 km^{2})	5,476/sq mi (2,114/km^{2})
25	New Haven	Connecticut	134,023	129,779	+3.27%	18.7 sq mi (48 km^{2})	7,170/sq mi (2,770/km^{2})
26	Allentown	Pennsylvania	125,845	118,032	+6.62%	17.5 sq mi (45 km^{2})	7,165/sq mi (2,766/km^{2})
27	Hartford	Connecticut	121,054	124,775	−2.98%	17.4 sq mi (45 km^{2})	6,965/sq mi (2,689/km^{2})
28	Cambridge	Massachusetts	118,403	105,162	+12.59%	6.4 sq mi (17 km^{2})	18,512/sq mi (7,148/km^{2})
29	Smithtown	New York	116,296	117,801	−1.28%	111.4 sq mi (289 km^{2})	1,000/sq mi (390/km^{2})
30	Manchester	New Hampshire	115,644	109,565	+5.55%	33.1 sq mi (86 km^{2})	3,497/sq mi (1,350/km^{2})
31	Lowell	Massachusetts	115,554	106,519	+8.48%	13.6 sq mi (35 km^{2})	8,490/sq mi (3,280/km^{2})
32	Waterbury	Connecticut	114,403	110,366	+3.66%	28.5 sq mi (74 km^{2})	4,011/sq mi (1,549/km^{2})
33	Edison	New Jersey	107,588	99,967	+7.62%	30.1 sq mi (78 km^{2})	3,578/sq mi (1,381/km^{2})
34	Brockton	Massachusetts	105,643	93,810	+12.61%	21.3 sq mi (55 km^{2})	4,952/sq mi (1,912/km^{2})
35	Columbia (Note: Census Designated Place)	Maryland	104,681	93,810	+11.59%	31.9 sq mi (83 km^{2})	3,278/sq mi (1,266/km^{2})
36	Woodbridge	New Jersey	103,639	99,585	+4.07%	23.3 sq mi (60 km^{2})	4,456/sq mi (1,720/km^{2})
37	Quincy	Massachusetts	101,636	92,271	+10.15%	16.6 sq mi (43 km^{2})	6,133/sq mi (2,368/km^{2})
38	Lynn	Massachusetts	101,253	90,329	+12.09%	10.7 sq mi (28 km^{2})	9,249/sq mi (3,571/km^{2})
39	New Bedford	Massachusetts	101,079	95,072	+6.32%	20.0 sq mi (52 km^{2})	5,054/sq mi (1,951/km^{2})

== Economy ==
The total GDP of the Northeast megalopolis is $5.6 trillion, of which around $2.3 trillion is from the New York metropolitan area. As of 2023, the Northeast megalopolis would have the third-highest GDP of any nation if it was its own country, ahead of Germany ($4.7 trillion).

Largest metropolitan statistical areas (MSAs) by GDP within the Northeast Megalopolis
2023 Rank	Metropolitan statistical area (MSA)	GDP (billions US$)
1	New York–Newark–Jersey City, NY-NJ MSA	2,298.868
2	Washington–Arlington–Alexandria, DC-VA-MD-WV MSA	714.685
3	Boston–Cambridge–Newton, MA-NH MSA	610.486
4	Philadelphia–Camden–Wilmington, PA-NJ-DE-MD MSA	557.601
5	Baltimore–Columbia–Towson, MD MSA	259.690
6	Virginia Beach–Chesapeake–Norfolk, VA-NC MSA	127.459
7	Hartford–West Hartford–East Hartford, CT MSA	122.805
8	Richmond, VA MSA	116.960
9	Bridgeport–Stamford–Danbury, CT MSA	116.031
10	Providence–Warwick, RI-MA MSA	111.840
11	New Haven, CT MSA	65.232
12	Worcester, MA MSA	64.135
13	Allentown–Bethlehem–Easton, PA-NJ MSA	59.891
14	Trenton–Princeton, NJ MSA	53.003
15	Portland–South Portland, ME MSA	48.037
16	Harrisburg–Carlisle, PA MSA	47.815
17	Kiryas Joel–Poughkeepsie–Newburgh, NY MSA	44.457
18	Springfield, MA MSA	42.356
19	Manchester–Nashua, NH MSA	36.597
20	Reading, PA MSA	25.975
21	Norwich–New London–Willimantic, CT MSA	23.910
22	Atlantic City–Hammonton, NJ MSA	18.727
23	Barnstable Town, MA MSA	18.187
24	Hagerstown–Martinsburg, MD-WV MSA	15.286
25	Kingston, NY MSA	9.905
26	Lexington Park, MD MSA	9.883
27	Amherst Town–Northampton, MA MSA	9.766
28	Vineland, NJ MSA	8.209
29	Chambersburg, PA MSA	8.149
	Northeast megalopolis	5,598.130

== History ==
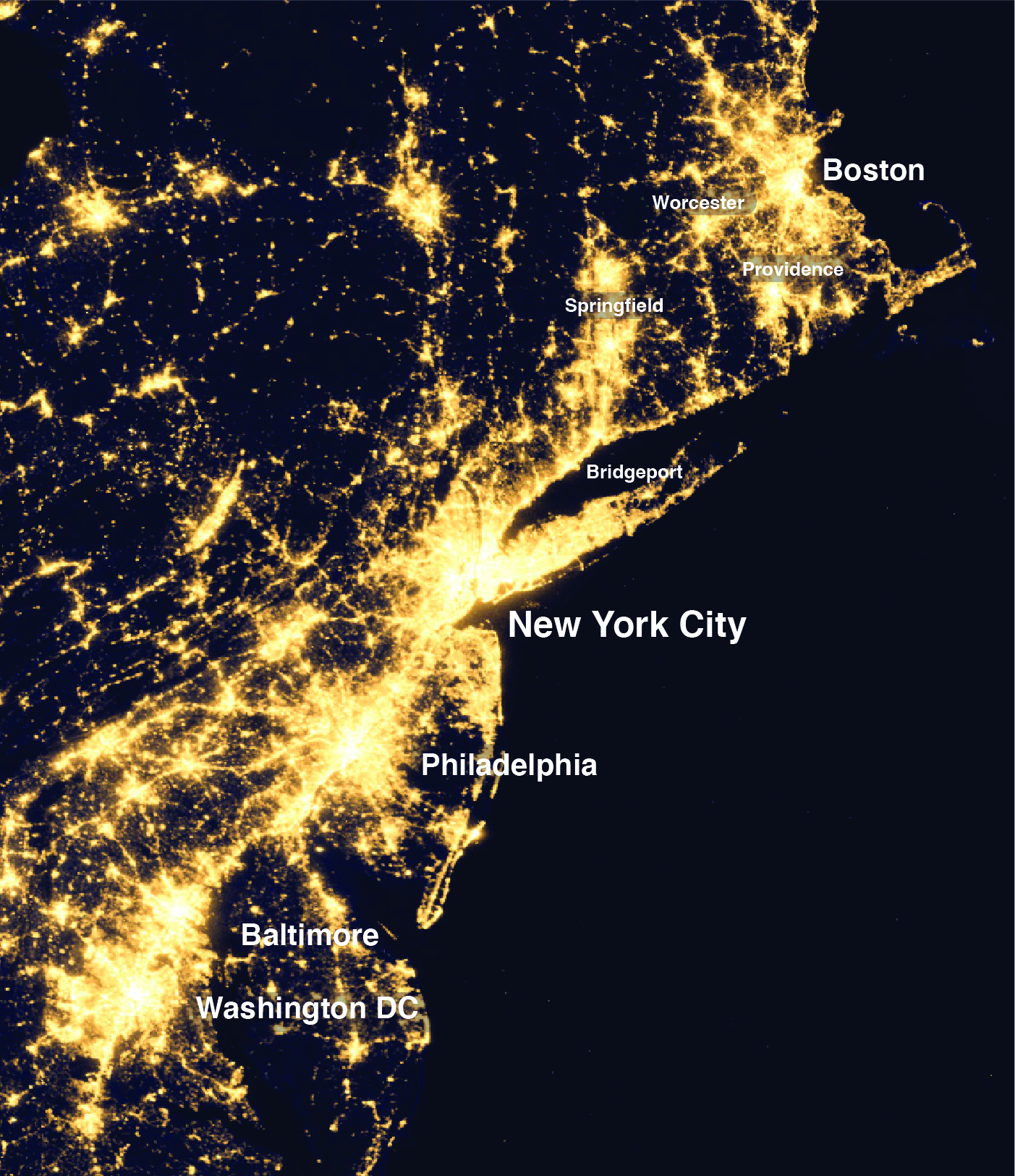
A satellite view of the Northeast megalopolitan region at night in November 2021

Due to its proximity to Europe, the Eastern coast of the United States was among the first regions of the continent to be widely settled by Europeans. Over time, the cities and towns founded on the East Coast had the advantage of age over most other parts of the U.S. However, it was the Northeast in particular that developed most rapidly, owing to a number of fortuitous circumstances.

While possessing neither particularly rich soil—one exception being New England's Connecticut River Valley—nor exceptional mineral wealth, the region still supports some agriculture and mining. The climate is temperate and not particularly prone to hurricanes or tropical storms, which increase further south. However, the most important factor was the "interpenetration of land and sea", which makes for exceptional harbors, such as those at the Chesapeake Bay, the Port of New York and New Jersey, Narragansett Bay in Providence, Rhode Island, and Boston Harbor. The coastline to the north is rocky and little sheltered, whereas to the south it is smooth and does not feature as many bays or inlets that might function as natural harbors. Also featured are navigable rivers that lead deeper into the heartlands, such as the Hudson, Delaware, and Connecticut rivers, which all support large populations and were necessary to early settlers for development. Therefore, while other parts of the country exceeded the region in raw resource value, they were not as easily accessible, and often, access to them necessarily had to pass through the Northeast first.

=== Modern history ===
The Northeast played a significant role in the foundation of the United States during the late colonial era and in the American Revolutionary War. Pre-revolutionary events like the Gaspee affair, the Boston Massacre, Boston Tea Party, and the First Continental Congress all occurred in the region. In 1775, the Battles of Lexington and Concord, the first major battle of the Revolution, occurred in Massachusetts a few miles away from Boston. Many of the most significant battles took place in the region, including the Battle of Bunker Hill, the Battle of Monmouth, the Battle of Trenton, the Battle of Princeton, as well as several significant military campaigns such as the Philadelphia Campaign, the New York and New Jersey Campaign, the Boston Campaign, and the Yorktown Campaign. The surrender of the British occurred in the south end of the megalopolis after the Siege of Yorktown in 1781. Other significant events that occurred during the Revolution at this time in the region include the Second Continental Congress, the creation of the Articles of Confederation, the signing of the Declaration of Independence, and the Constitutional Convention.

During the Civil War, while most of the region did not experience fighting, there were many significant battles in the southern end of the region, particularly in Virginia. Major battles such as the Battle of Gettysburg, the Battle of Antietam, the Battles of Bull Run, the Battle of Fredericksburg, the Battle of Chancellorsville, and the Battles of Petersburg all occurred in the region. Additionally, Richmond acted as the capital of the Confederacy.

In 1800, the region included the only three U.S. cities with populations of over 25,000: Philadelphia, New York City, and Baltimore. By 1850, New York City and Philadelphia alone had over 300,000 residents while Baltimore, Boston, Brooklyn (at that time a separate city from New York), Cincinnati, and New Orleans had over 100,000: five were within one 400-mile strip while the last two were each four hundred miles away from the next closest metropolis. The immense concentration of people in one relatively densely packed area gave that region considerable sway through population density over the rest of the nation, which was solidified in 1800 when Washington, D.C., only 38 miles southwest of Baltimore, was made the nation's capital. According to Gottmann, capital cities "will tend to create for and around the seats of power a certain kind of built environment, singularly endowed, for instance, with monumentality, stressing status and ritual, a trait that will increase with duration." The transportation and telecommunications infrastructure that the capital city mandated also spilled over into the rest of the strip.

Additionally, the proximity to Europe, as well as the prominence of Ellis Island as an immigrant processing center, made New York City and cities nearby a "landing wharf for European immigrants," who represented an ever replenished supply of diversity of thought and determined workers. By contrast, the other major source of trans-oceanic immigrants was China, which was farther from the U.S. West Coast than Europe was from the East, and whose ethnicity made them targets of racial discrimination, creating barriers to their seamless integration into American society. By 1950, the region held over one-fifth of the total U.S. population, with a density nearly 15 times that of the national average.

The region has been home to the richest city in the nation for over 200 years: Hartford, Connecticut held the title from the pre–Civil War industrial era until about 1929, and New York City has held it since. Loudoun and Fairfax County, Virginia are the wealthiest counties in the country, and Connecticut's Gold Coast has one of the highest population densities of families worth over $30 million USD.

== Concept ==
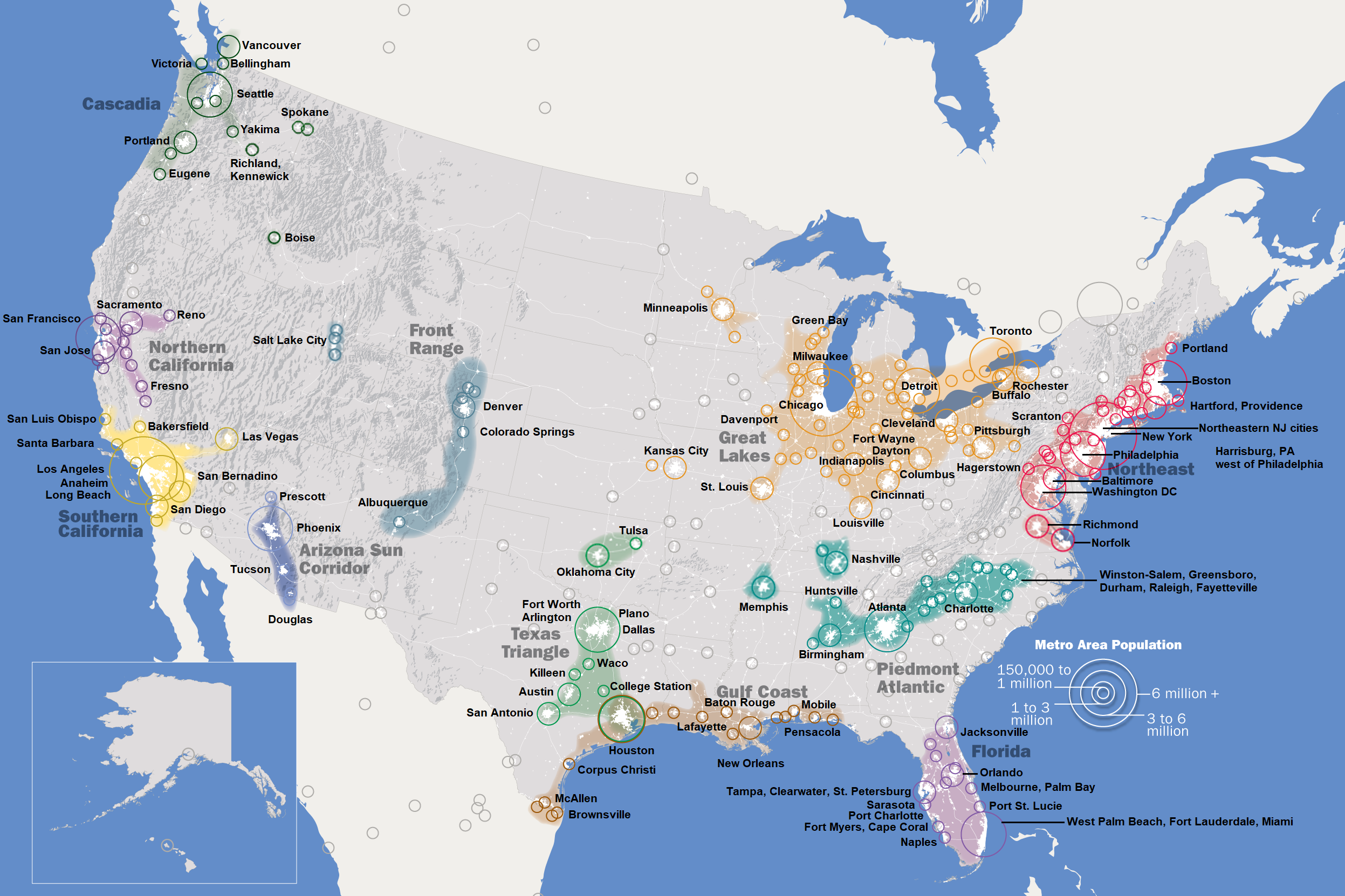
Map of the 11 megaregions of the United States, with the Northeast megalopolis highlighted in red in the upper right

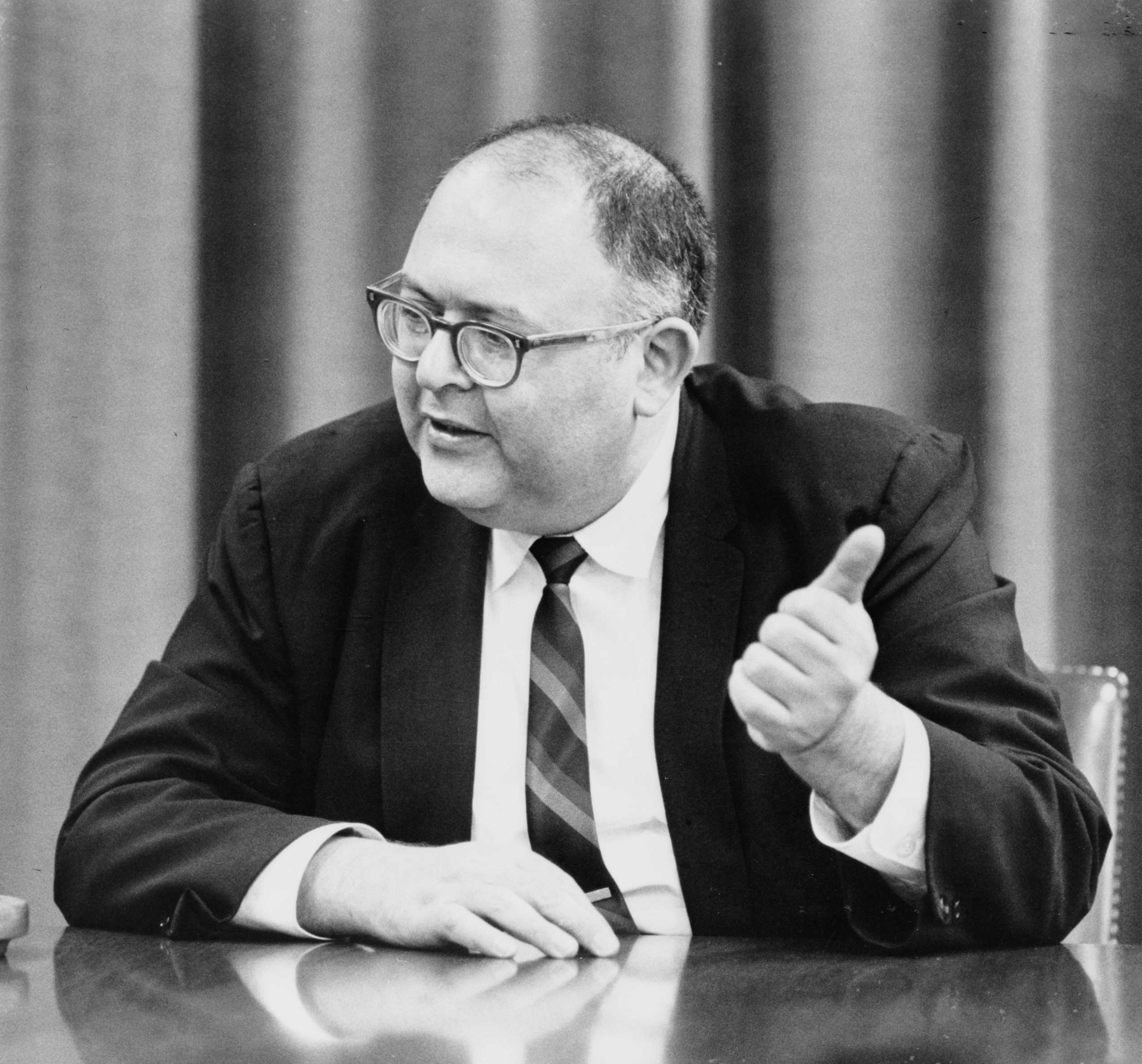
Herman Kahn, co-author of The Year 2000: A Framework for Speculation on the Next Thirty-Three Years, in which the term BosWash first appeared.

The concept of megalopolises originated with Jean Gottmann, a French geographer who wrote the 1961 book Megalopolis: The Urbanized Northeastern Seaboard of the United States, whose central theory was that the cities between Washington, D.C., and Boston together form a sort of cohesive, integrated "supercity." He took the term megalopolis from a small Greek town that was settled in the Classical Era with the hope it would "become the largest of the Greek cities". The city still exists today, but is largely a sleepy agricultural community. However, the dream of the city's founders, Gottmann argued, was being realized in the Northeastern U.S. in the 1960s with the ascent of the region to global political, academic, and economic prominence.

Gottmann defined two criteria for a group of cities to be a true megalopolis: "polynuclear structure" and "manifold concentration"—that is, the presence of multiple urban nuclei, which exist independently of each other yet are integrated in a special way relative to sites outside their area.

While the major cities of the Northeast megalopolis all are distinct, independent cities, they are closely linked by transportation and telecommunications. Neil Gustafson showed in 1961 that the vast majority of phone calls originating in the region terminate elsewhere in the region, and it is only a minority that are routed to elsewhere in the United States or abroad. In 2010 automobiles carried 80% of Boston-Washington corridor travel; intercity buses 8–9%; Amtrak 6%; and airlines 5%. Business ventures unique to the region have sprung up that capitalize on the interconnectedness of the megalopolis, such as airline shuttle services that operate short flights between Boston and New York City and New York City and Washington, D.C. that leave every half-hour, Amtrak's Acela Express high-speed rail service from Washington to Boston, and the Chinatown bus lines, which offer economy transportation between the cities' Chinatowns and elsewhere. Other bus lines operating in the megalopolitan area owned by national or international corporations have also appeared, such as BoltBus and Megabus. These ventures indicate not only the dual "independent nuclei"/"interlinked system" nature of the megalopolis, but also a broad public understanding of and capitalization on the concept.

In 2007, Gottmann's "megalopolis" concept was largely supported by John Rennie Short, who authored an update to Gottmann's book, Liquid City: Megalopolis and the Contemporary Northeast. National Geographic Society released a map in 1994 of the region at the time of the American Revolutionary War and in present day, which borrowed Gottmann's book's title. U.S. Senator Claiborne Pell wrote a book, Megalopolis Unbound in 1966, which summarized and expanded on Gottman's original book to outline his vision for a cohesive transportation policy in the region, including his state of Rhode Island.

In 1967, futurists Herman Kahn and Anthony Wiener coined the term "BosWash" to predict that the region would emerge as the sort of megalopolis initially described by Gottmann. Their ideas were part of a study commissioned in 1965 by the American Academy of Arts and Sciences, which published the results of the commission's findings in 1967 as "Toward the Year 2000: Work in Progress", a special issue of their journal Dædalus. In their portion, Kahn and Wiener, discussing urbanization, began by writing:

The United States in the year 2000 will probably see at least three gargantuan megalopolises. We have labeled these—only half frivolously—"Boswash," "Chipitts," and "SanSan."

BosWash was described as "the megalopolis that will extend from Washington to Boston" along "an extremely narrow strip of the North Atlantic coast." ChiPitts, mentioned as being from Chicago to Pittsburgh but extending east to Rochester, New York, was laid out as "on Lake Erie and the southern and western shores of Lake Michigan and Lake Ontario" and SanSan as "an even more narrow strip on the West Coast" from either Santa Barbara or San Francisco to San Diego in California.

The three terms gained use in the period immediately following publication of The Year 2000, with Newsweek using them in 1967 and Changing Times featuring them in 1968. However, the names are currently not used in any official capacity, and, of the three, only BosWash is described in Random House Dictionary as "informal". BosNYWash is a variant term that specifically references New York City, which is a central hub and has long been by far the largest metropolis in the region and the country. In 1971, The Bosnywash Megalopolis was published.

Isaac Asimov predicted in 1964 that by 2014, "Boston-to-Washington, the most crowded area of its size on the earth, will have become a single city with a population of over 40,000,000".

In a 2005 study titled Beyond Megalopolis, researchers at Virginia Tech's Metropolitan Institute views the Northeast Megapolitan Area as extending beyond Boston and Washington – past Portland, Maine and Richmond, Virginia – and described it as one of ten such areas in the United States. The authors analyzed Google search results to determine plausible names for the regions, rejecting terms such as BosWash, stating: "We decided that combined place names seemed contrived and offered little chance for eventual adoption. Therefore, labels such as 'BosWash' to refer to the Northeast or 'SanSac' in reference to the combined San Francisco and Sacramento metropolitan areas were not considered."

== See also ==
- Conurbation
- East Coast of the United States
- Megaregions of the United States
- Mid-Atlantic (United States)
- Northeast Corridor
- Quebec City–Windsor Corridor, a densely populated corridor in Canada
