= Wijaya Godakumbura =

Sri Lankan surgeon

- Born: Pelmadulla Ratnapura District Sri Lanka
- Education: Pelmadulla Central College Pelmadulla; Nalanda College Colombo; Ceylon Medical College
- Known for: Surgeon; Founder of Safe bottle lamp Foundation
- Title: Vidya Jyothi

Wijaya Godakumbura is the President of the Safe bottle lamp Foundation and was formerly a surgeon in Sri Lanka.

== Early life ==
Godakumbura was born in Pelmadulla in Ratnapura District. He passed his advanced level with high marks in 1959 from Nalanda College Colombo and entered Ceylon Medical College to study medicine. In 1964 he completed Bachelor of Medicine, Bachelor of Surgery and passed out as a doctor. while at Nalanda, Godakumbura excelled in sport such as athletic and football.

== Career ==
Later in 1970s he went to United Kingdom for further studies and training. After being specialized in the treatment of Burns, Godakumbura returned to Sri Lanka and worked as a surgeon in many hospitals.

== Invention of Safe Bottle Lamp ==
After seeing and treating many patients who had burn injuries due to unsafe kerosine bottle lamps he developed the Safe Bottle Lamp in 1992. He established the Safe bottle lamp foundation in 1998 after winning the Rolex Awards for Enterprise.

Then in 2009 his development won the first place in The World Challenge competition held in The Hague Netherlands.
