= S. Mahalingam (engineer) =

Vidya Jyothi S. Mahalingam
- செல்வத்துரை மகாலிங்கம்
- Born: 16 January 1926; Alaveddy, Ceylon
- Died: 3 November 2015 (aged 89); Jaffna, Sri Lanka
- Education: Ceylon Technical College; University of Sheffield
- Occupation: Academic
- Spouse: Devaki (d. 2014)
- Parent(s): Selvadurai and Nagamma Sellasaraswathy
- Website: https://www.profsmahalingam.org/

Selvadurai Mahalingam (16 January 1926 – 3 November 2015) was a Sri Lankan Tamil mechanical engineer and academic.

== Early life and family ==
Mahalingam was born on 16 January 1926 in Alaveddy in northern Ceylon. He was the son of Selvadurai and Nagamma Sellasaraswathy. When he was young his family moved to Malaya. He was educated at Maxwell School and Victoria College in Malaya. He returned to Ceylon aged 20 and joined Ceylon Technical College in 1946, graduating with a first class B.Sc.Eng. degree. He received a Ph.D. degree from the University of Sheffield in 1956.

Mahalingam married Devaki.

== Career ==
Mahalingam joined the Engineering Faculty of the University of Ceylon (later University of Ceylon, Peradeniya, University of Peradeniya) when it was established in 1950. He was the last surviving pioneer among the founding academic staff of Sri Lanka's first engineering faculty.

In 1958 he wrote highly acclaimed research paper on vibration, Vibration of Branched System: A Displacement Excitation Approach, which was published in the Journal of Applied Mechanics. Mahalingam received a D.Sc.Eng. degree from the University of London after which he was promoted to professor. After retirement in 1991 he served as an emeritus professor at the University of Peradeniya.

Mahalingam received the Vidya Jyothi honour in 2005. He died on 3 November 2015 at the private North Central Hospital in Jaffna.
