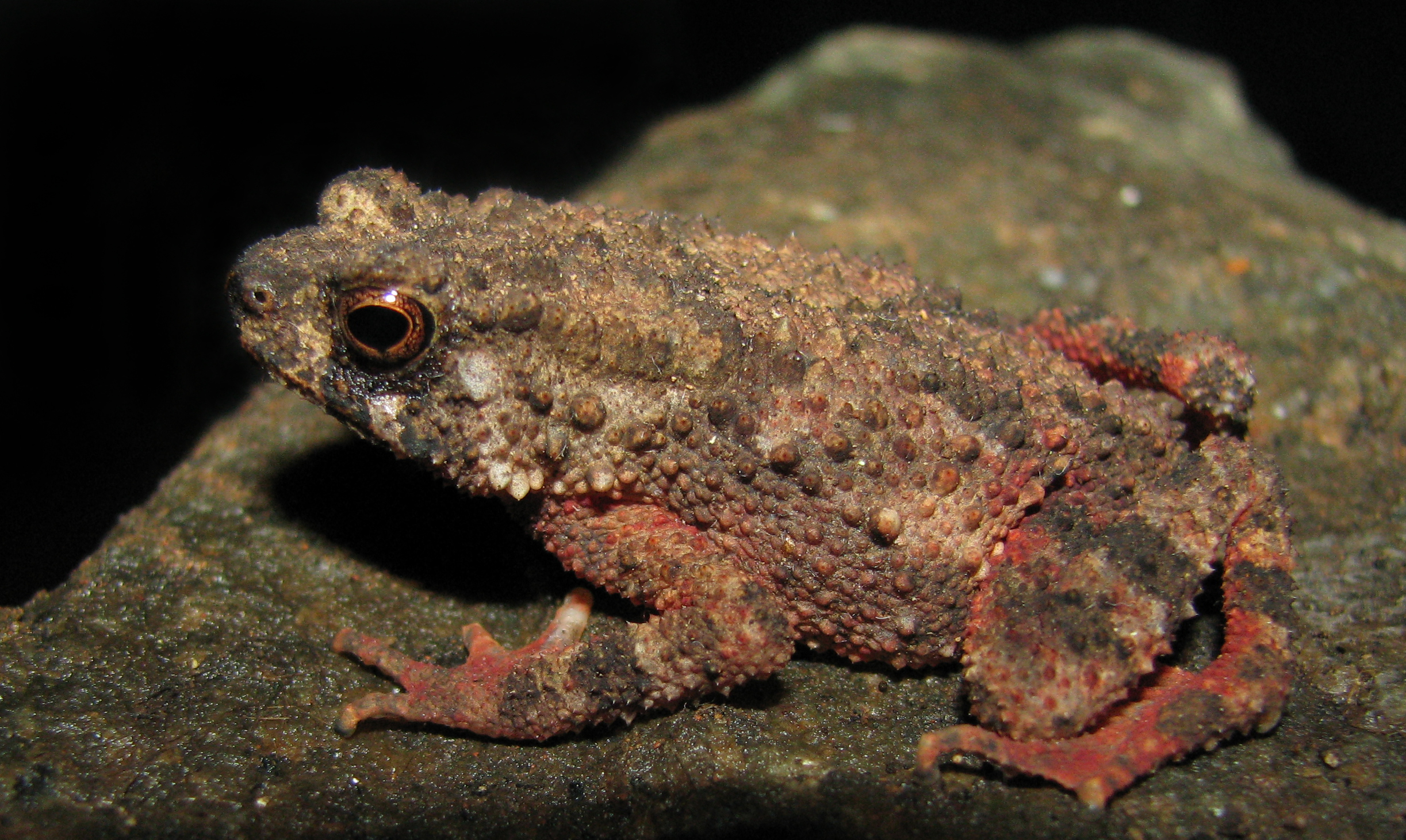

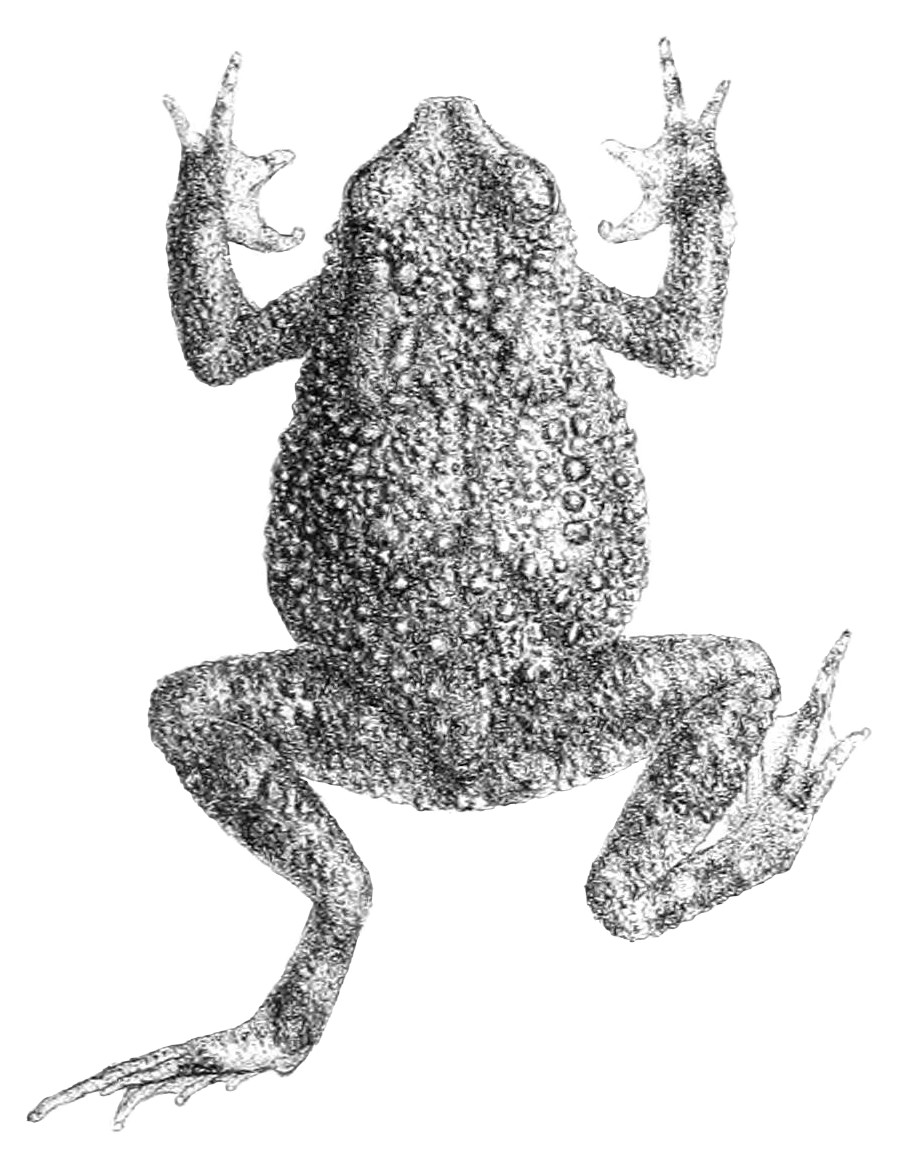

Conservation status
- Vulnerable (IUCN 3.1)

Scientific classification
- Kingdom: Animalia
- Phylum: Chordata
- Class: Amphibia
- Order: Anura
- Family: Bufonidae
- Genus: Duttaphrynus
- Species: D. beddomii

Binomial name
- Duttaphrynus beddomii (Günther, 1876)

Synonyms
- Bufo beddomii Günther, 1876 "1875"; Bufo travancoricus Beddome, 1878 "1877"

= Duttaphrynus beddomii =

Beddome's toad

Species of amphibian

Duttaphrynus beddomii, commonly known as Beddome's toad is a species of toad endemic to the Western Ghats of India. It is found in Kerala and Tamil Nadu states in the southern Western Ghats at elevations of 100–1,500 m (330–4,920 ft) asl.

== Description ==
Duttaphrynus beddomii exhibits a crown that lacks bony ridges; its short, projecting snout has an angular canthus rostralis. Its interorbital space is somewhat broader than the upper eyelid. Its tympanum is very small, and sometimes indistinct. The species' first finger does not extend beyond the second; its toes are nearly entirely webbed, with single subarticular tubercles, two small metatarsal tubercles, and no tarsal fold. The tarso-metatarsal articulation reaches to between the eye and the tip of the snout. Its upper parts are covered with rough tubercles; its parotoids ovate, about twice as long as broad, are rather indistinct. The toad is dark brown as seen from above, with indistinct black spots; its limbs are marbled with carmine; its lower surfaces are marbled with brown.

Duttaphrynus beddomii measures 4.4 cm (1.75 in) from snout to vent.
