= Safe bottle lamp =

The Safe bottle lamp, called sudeepa or sudipa for good lamp, is a safer kerosene lamp designed by Wijaya Godakumbura of Sri Lanka. The safety comes from heavier glass, a secure screw-on metal lid, and two flat sides which prevent it from rolling if knocked over.

== History ==
As surgeon Dr. Godakumbura saw many burn cases caused by kerosene lamp fires. Over 1 million homes in Sri Lanka do not have electricity, and rely on kerosene lamps for illumination, often improvised lamps made from bottles. These tall lamps tip easily, and when they do, the wick holder often falls out and starts a sudden, intense fire. Often the fuel falls on a nearby person, setting them ablaze and resulting in severe burns, often fatal.

In 1992, Dr. Godakumbura set out to design a new lamp that was both safer, and inexpensive enough to be affordable by the impoverished Sri Lankans at risk for these fires. The resulting lamp is a small, flattened sphere, which resists tipping and rolling. It is made of thick glass to resist breaking, and has a screw-on metal cap that holds the wick in place and prevents spilling.

In 1993, with contributions from numerous sources, including science fiction writer and Sri Lanka resident Arthur C. Clarke, and the Canadian High Commission, the lamp was put into production.

Available for a cost of less than US$0.25 each, over half a million of the new lamps have been sold, and Dr. Godakumbura hopes to continue producing the new lamps until use of improvised lamps drops to a small percentage of lamp use in Sri Lanka.

== The Foundation ==
Having received a Rolex Award for Enterprise in 1998, Dr. Godakumbura established the Safe Bottle Lamp Foundation (SBLF), a non-profit organization. The Foundation is governed by a board of directors and employs two full-time staff.

In addition to the Rolex Award, the foundation and Dr. Godakumbura have received a range of other local and international awards and grants. Among these are a Lindbergh Foundation Grant and a BBC World Challenge Award. The project has been featured in many international publications such as TIME, Newsweek, Science and Nature, National Geographic and La Figaro.

Dr. Godakumbura has represented the foundation in many international conferences on burn and accident prevention as a speaker or as a participant. The foundation and the Sudeepa lamp have been promoted as a replicable solution for other developing countries where accidental burns due to unsafe lamps is prevalent.

== See also ==
- Kerosene lamp
- Appropriate technology
