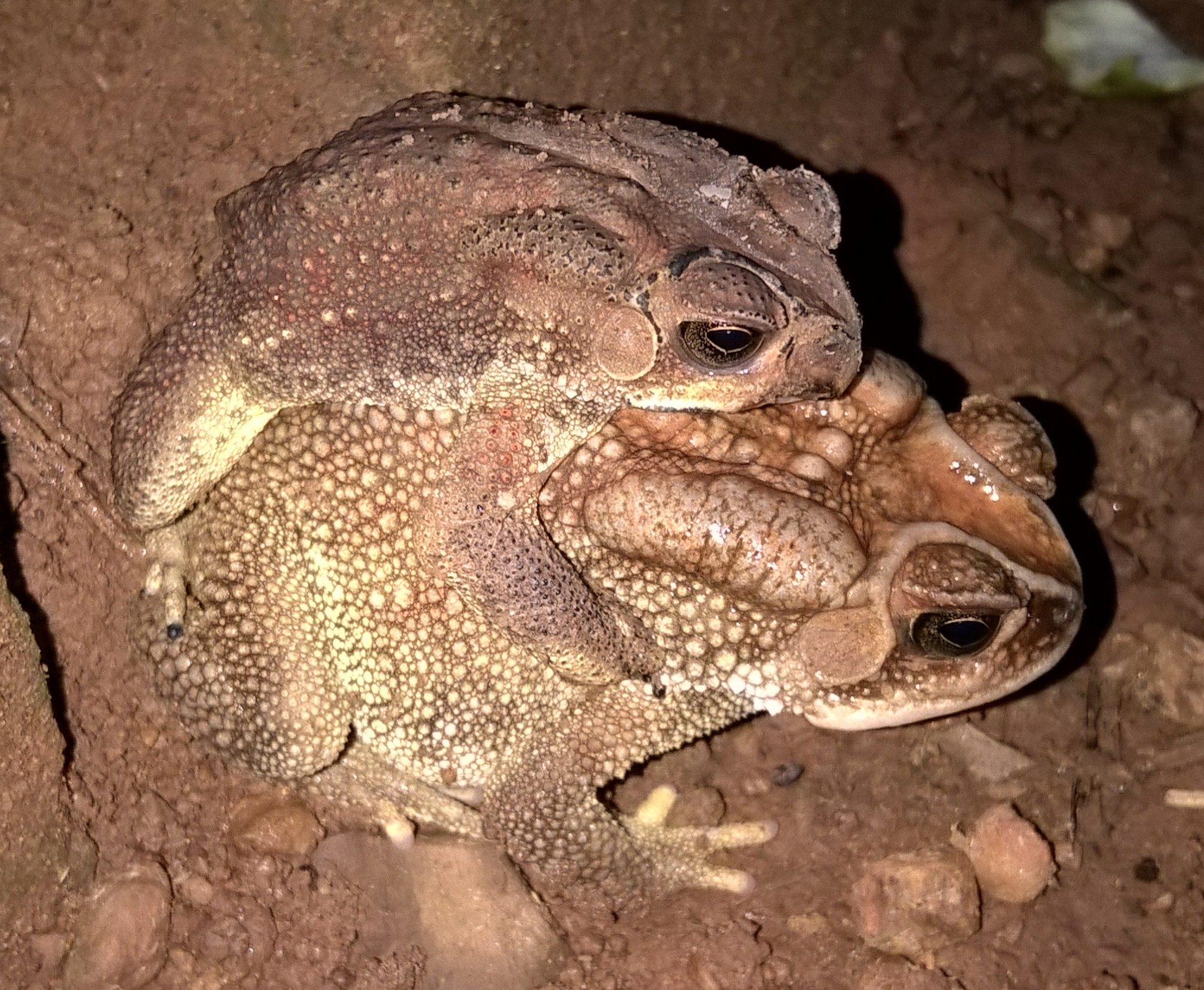
- A Duttaphrynus melanostictus pair during amplexus

Scientific classification
- Kingdom: Animalia
- Phylum: Chordata
- Class: Amphibia
- Order: Anura
- Family: Bufonidae
- Genus: Duttaphrynus; Frost et al., 2006

Species
- See text

= Duttaphrynus =

Genus of amphibians

Duttaphrynus, named after Sushil Kumar Dutta, is a genus of true toads endemic to southwestern and southern China (including Hainan), Taiwan and throughout southern Asia from northern Pakistan and Nepal through India and Bangladesh to Sri Lanka, Andaman Island, Sumatra, Java, Borneo and Bali.

== Description ==
These toads are characterized by heads with prominent, bony ridges, such as a canthal, a preorbital, a supraorbital, a postorbital ridge and a short orbitotympanic ridge. The snout is short and blunt; the interorbital space is broader than the upper eyelid; the tympanum is very small, not half the diameter of eye, and generally indistinct. The first finger of these toads extends beyond the second; the toes are half webbed with single subarticular tubercles, two moderate metatarsal tubercles, and no tarsal fold. The tarsometatarsal articulation reaches the eye, or between the eye and the tip of the snout. The upper surface features are irregular and distinctly porous warts with prominent parotoids. These are elliptical and two, or two and a half, times as long as they are broad. The toads are brown above and yellow beneath, marbled with brown. Males have a subgular vocal sac and are typically 3 in long.

This genus was previously assigned to the Bufo melanostictus group. Frost et al. suggested that species of the genus Duttaphrynus are only distantly related to other Asiatic bufonids and consequently moved these species to a separate genus in 2006.

== Species ==
| Binomial name and author | Common name |
|---|---|
| Duttaphrynus beddomii (Günther, 1876) | Beddome's toad |
| Duttaphrynus brevirostris (Rao, 1937) | Kempholey toad |
| Duttaphrynus chandai Das, Chetia, Dutta, and Sengupta, 2013 | Nagaland montane torrent toad |
| Duttaphrynus crocus (Wogan, Win, Thin, Lwin, Shein, Kyi & Tun, 2003) |
| Duttaphrynus dhufarensis (Parker, 1931) | Oman toad |
| Duttaphrynus himalayanus (Günther, 1864) | Himalayan broad-skulled toad |
| Duttaphrynus kotagamai (Fernando & Dayawansa, 1994) | Kotagama's dwarf toad |
| Duttaphrynus mamitensis (Mathew and Sen, 2009) | Mamit's toad |
| Duttaphrynus manipurensis (Mathew and Sen, 2009) | Mamit's toad |
| Duttaphrynus melanostictus (Schneider, 1799) | Asian common toad |
| Duttaphrynus microtympanum (Boulenger, 1882) | Small-eared toad |
| Duttaphrynus mizoramensis (Mathew and Sen, 2009) | Kolasib's toad |
| Duttaphrynus nagalandensis (Mathew and Sen, 2009) | Nagaland's toad |
| Duttaphrynus noellerti (Manamendra-Arachchi & Pethiyagoda, 1998) | Noellert's toad |
| Duttaphrynus parietalis (Boulenger, 1882) | Indian toad |
| Duttaphrynus scaber (Schneider, 1799) | Schneider's toad |
| Duttaphrynus silentvalleyensis (Pillai, 1981) | Silent Valley toad |
| Duttaphrynus stuarti (Smith, 1929) | Stuart's toad |
| Duttaphrynus sumatranus (Peters, 1871) | Sumatra toad |
| Duttaphrynus totol (Ohler, 2010) |
| Duttaphrynus valhallae (Meade-Waldo, 1909) | Pulo Weh toad |
| Duttaphrynus wokhaensis (Mathew and Sen, 2009) | Wokha's toad |
