= Cnemaspis kotagamai =

Scientific classification
- Kingdom: Animalia
- Phylum: Chordata
- Class: Reptilia
- Order: Squamata
- Suborder: Gekkota
- Family: Gekkonidae
- Genus: Cnemaspis
- Species: C. kotagamai

Binomial name
- Cnemaspis kotagamai Karunarathna, de Silva, Botejue, Surasinghe, Wickramasinghe, Ukuwela & Bauer, 2019

Species of lizard

Cnemaspis kotagamai, or Kotagama's day gecko, is a species of diurnal gecko endemic to island of Sri Lanka, described in 2019 from Ratnapura.

== Etymology ==
The specific name kotagamai is named in honor of ornithologist Sarath Kotagama.

== Taxonomy ==
The species is closely related to C. ingerorum and C. kallima morphological aspects.

== Ecology ==
The species was discovered from a granite cave in Bambaragala forest, Pallebedda, Ratnapura.

== Description ==
Snout-to-vent length is 29.8 mm in adult male.
