= Second Battle of Petersburg order of battle =

Forces at the 1864 Second Battle of Petersburg

The order of battle for the Second Battle of Petersburg includes:

- Second Battle of Petersburg order of battle: Confederate, similar to the Battle of Cold Harbor order of battle
- Second Battle of Petersburg order of battle: Union

== See also ==
- Siege of Petersburg order of battle
