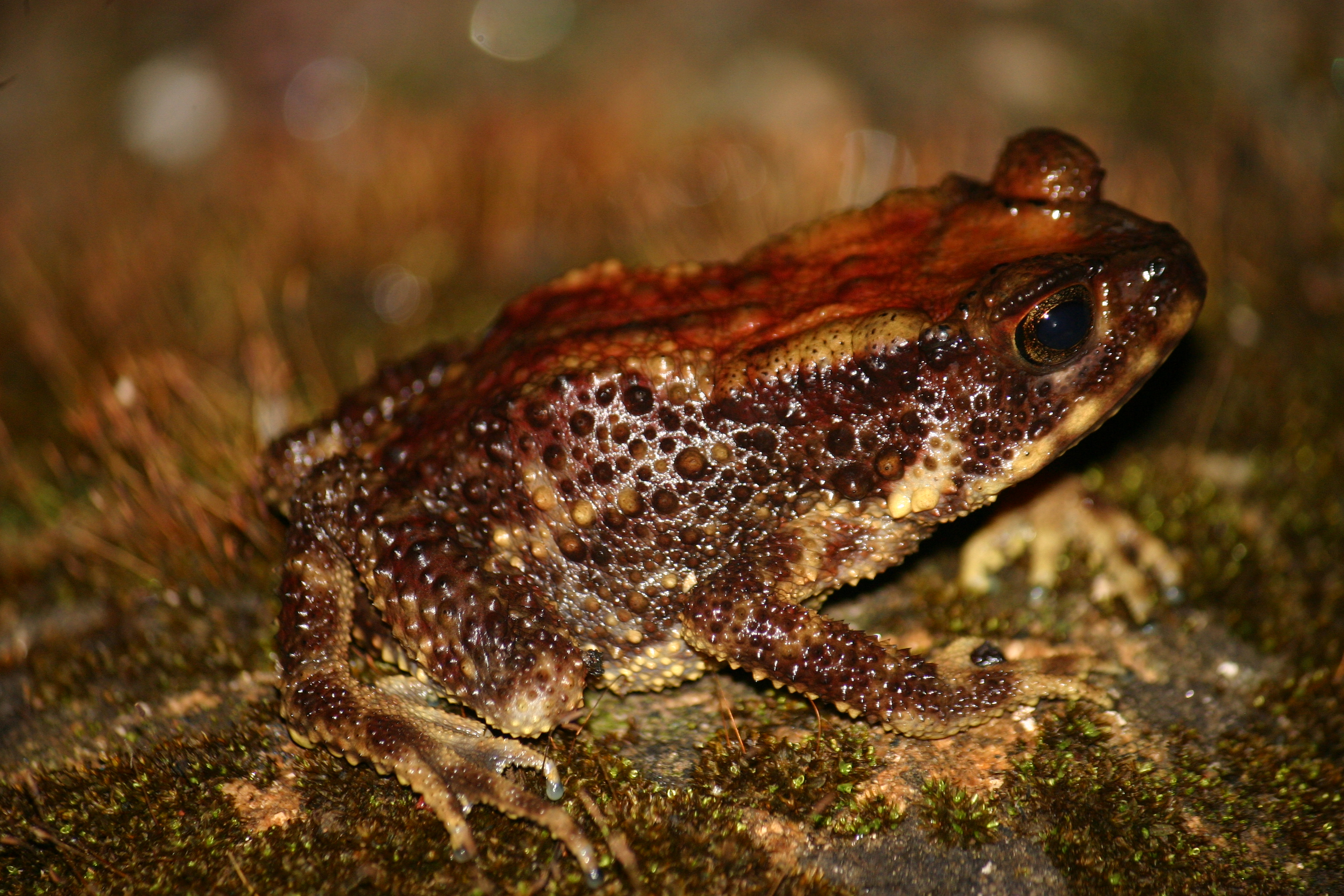

Conservation status
- Least Concern (IUCN 3.1)

Scientific classification
- Kingdom: Animalia
- Phylum: Chordata
- Class: Amphibia
- Order: Anura
- Family: Bufonidae
- Genus: Duttaphrynus
- Species: D. microtympanum

Binomial name
- Duttaphrynus microtympanum (Boulenger, 1882)

Synonyms
- Bufo microtympanum Boulenger, 1882

= Duttaphrynus microtympanum =

Species of amphibian

Duttaphrynus microtympanum, commonly known as southern hill toad, or small-eared toad, is a species of toad found in the Western Ghats of India, possibly wider.

== Description ==
The head of this species has prominent bony ridges, viz. a canthal, a preorbital, a supraorbital, a postorbital, and a short orbitotympanic; the snout is short and blunt; the interorbital space is broader than the upper eyelid; the tympanum is very small, not half the diameter of eye, and generally indistinct (thus the common name). The first finger extends beyond the second; the toes are about half webbed, with single subarticular tubercles; two moderate metatarsal tubercles are present, with no tarsal fold. The tarsometatarsal articulation reaches the eye, or between the eye and the tip of the snout. Upper surfaces have irregular, distinctly porous warts; the parotoids are prominent, elliptical, and twice or twice and a half as long as broad. They are brown above, yellow beneath, marbled with brown. Males have a subgular vocal sac.

The snout-to-vent length is about 3 in.
