= Stella de Silva =

Medical doctor and paediatrician

Stella Gertrude de Silva (2 June, 1918 - 12 April, 2012), was a medical doctor and paediatrician from Sri Lanka.

== Biography ==
De Silva was born in Balapitiya, and attended Prajapathi Vidyalaya, Ambalangoda and the single-sex girls' school, Southlands College, in Galle. She was then admitted to the nearby boys' school, Richmond College, as Southlands College did not have science facilities. Her older brother encouraged her to pursue tertiary study, and she entered Ceylon Medical College in 1937. She graduated in 1942, and worked in Galle and Avissawella hospitals and then undertook seven years of clinical training at the University of Colombo’s teaching hospitals. One of her teachers was Sri Lanka's first trained paediatrician, L.O. Abeyratne.

De Silva completed a post-graduate training course in Britain, and from 1959 she served as consultant paediatrician at the Lady Ridgeway Hospital for Children, Castle Street Hospital for Women and De Soysa Maternity Home. She also spent time working at Morgan Stanley Children's Hospital in New York. She retired in 1973, aged 55.

In 1985, at the age of 67, she was appointed professor and head of paediatrics at North Colombo Medical College, where she established the department of paediatrics. She held this position until again retiring in 2003.

She has served as president of the Sri Lanka College of Paediatrics, president of the Sri Lanka Medical Association, president of the Sri Lanka Medical Library and editor, Sri Lanka Journal of Child Health. Following her retirement in 2003, she became an active member of Zonta International.

In 1994, de Silva received the national honour Vidya Jothi for her contributions to science and medicine.
