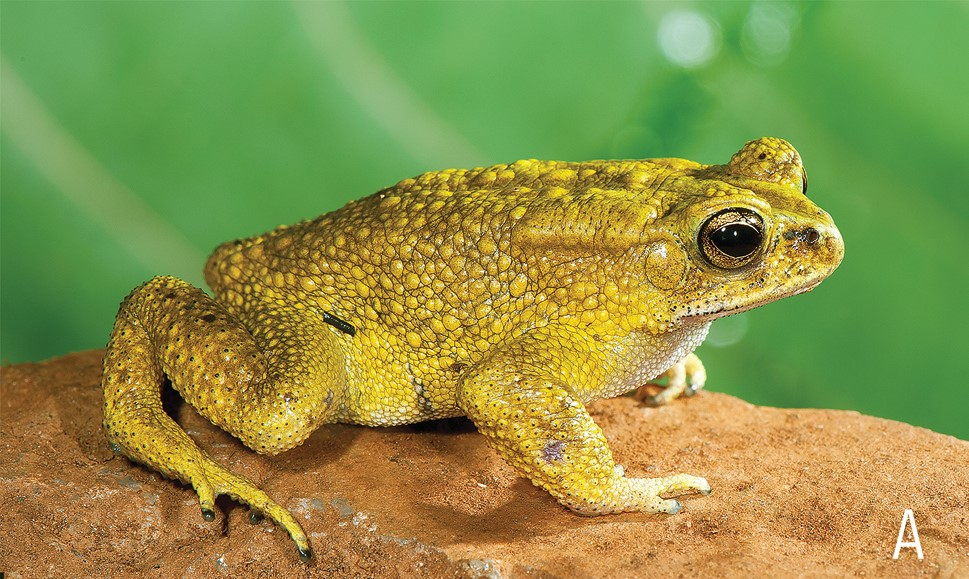

Conservation status
- Vulnerable (IUCN 3.1)

Scientific classification
- Kingdom: Animalia
- Phylum: Chordata
- Class: Amphibia
- Order: Anura
- Family: Bufonidae
- Genus: Duttaphrynus
- Species: D. brevirostris

Binomial name
- Duttaphrynus brevirostris (Rao, 1937)

Synonyms
- Bufo brevirostris Rao, 1937

= Duttaphrynus brevirostris =

Species of amphibian

Duttaphrynus brevirostris (common names: Kempholey toad, short-nosed toad, Rao's pale brown toad) is a species of toad in the family Bufonidae. It is endemic to the Western Ghats in India, where it is only known from the state of Karnataka.

Prior to 2013, it was known only from the now lost holotype collected in 1937 at its type locality, Kempholey in Hassan district, at about 200–300 m (660–980 ft) asl, and nothing was known about its habitat or ecology. However, it was rediscovered in 2013 when a toad matching the original description of this species was collected at Kempholey, and further specimens from Udupi and Kodagu districts were also identified as D. brevirostris, expanding its known range. These results were published in 2021. Specimens were found at night in open secondary forests and urban areas.
