= Vidya Jyothi =

Sri Lankan national honour for scientific/technological achievements

The Vidya Jyothi (Sinhala: විද්‍යාජෝති; Tamil: வித்யஜோதி, romanized: Vityā Jōti) is a Sri Lankan national honour awarded "for outstanding scientific and technological achievements". It is the highest national honour for science in Sri Lanka for outstanding contribution to the development of the country through dedicated work in the chosen field. It is conventionally used as a title or prefix to the awardee's name.

Vidya Jyothi ranks lower than Veera Chudamani.

== Awardees ==
Awardees include:

1986

- Geoffrey Manning Bawa
- Arthur Charles Clarke
- Suntheralingam Gnanalingam
- Arumadura Nandasena Silva Kulasinghe
- Arumugam Wisvalingam Mailvaganam
- Christopher Rajindra Panabokke
- E.O. Eustace Pereira

1987

- Gamini Lakshman Peiris

1988

- Phillip Reyvatha Wijewardene
- Kanapathypillai Yoheswaran
- Nandrani Swarnamitta de Zoysa

1989

- Ratna Sabapathy Cooke

1990

- Cyril Andrew Ponnamperuma
- Kotti Rambukkana Mahawahalla Anthony Don Michael
- Mohamed Uvais Siddeek Sultanbawa

1991

- Hapugoda Rankotge Premaratne
- Raja Hemapala de Silva

1992

- Beatrice Vivienne de Mel
- Kudatelge Rubert Shelton Peiris
- Sembukuttiarachchilage Roland Silva
- Nalin Chandra Wickramasinghe

1993

- Karannagoda Kankanamalage Yasaratne Wijayasundara Perera
- Herathmudiyanselage Herbert Ratnayake Samarasinghe
- Rezvi Sheriff
- Welapura Naidelage Gemunu Silva

1994

- Shelton Aloysius Cabraal
- Cecil Ashley de Vos
- Stella Gertrude de Silva

1998

- D. P. Anura Fernando
- C. B. Dissanayake
- M. A. Careem
- J. B. Peiris
- Diyanath Samarasinghe
- Senaka Dias Bandaranayake
- Arjuna Aluwihare
- V. K. Samaranayake
- R. O. Barnes Wijesekera

2005

- A. D. S. Gunawardena
- Colvin Gunaratne
- Damian Nobert Lakshman Alwis
- Damitha Ramanayake
- Dayantha Sepala Wijesekera
- E. W. Marasinghe
- Eric H. Karunanayake
- Janaka de Silva
- Lalitha Mendis
- Mohan Jayatilake
- S. Mahalingam
- S. Mohanadas
- Wijaya Godakumbura

2017

- Alagiyawanna Mohotti Appuhamillage Nimal Kitsiri Senanayake
- Bandula Wijayarathna
- Colvin Ananda Samarasinghe
- Delpechitracharige Gajabahu Harendra de Silva
- De Silva T. K. Nimal Padmasena
- Errol Radcliffe Jansz
- Lal Gotabhaya Chandrasena
- Mahamendige Wilfred Joseph Gerard Mendis
- Moderage Marian Rohan Waas Jayasekara
- Sarath Wimalabandara Kotagama
- Upali Tissa Vitarana

2018

- Arjuna de Silva
- Don Dilshan Abeywardane
- Bandula Wijesiriwardena
- Asita de Silva
- Prasad Katulanda
- Vajira Dissanayake
- Mandika Wijeyaratne
