= Sarath Kotagama =

Sri Lankan ornithologist and environmentalist

Vidya Jyothi Sarath Wimalabandara Kotagama (Sinhala: සරත් විමලබන්ඩාර කොටගම) is a Sri Lankan ornithologist and environmentalist. He is a Professor Emeritus and former head of the Department of Zoology, University of Colombo.

== Education ==
Kotagama obtained a BSc from the University of Colombo, and gained a PhD on the feeding and behavioral ecology of rose-ringed parakeet at the University of Aberdeen.

== Career ==
Since 1974, Kotagama has lectured at the Department of Zoology, University of Colombo and at the Zoological Division, Faculty of Natural Sciences, Open University of Sri Lanka reaching Senior Lecturer - Grade I by 1997. Between 1989 and 1990 he served as Director of the Department of Wildlife Conservation on secondment. In 1997, he was appointed Professor of Environmental Science in the Department of Zoology, University of Colombo holding it until he gained Professor Emeritus status on retirement. He also served a tenure as Head of the Department of Zoology, University of Colombo. Currently he is a Scientific adviser to the Ministry of Wildlife Resources Conservation.

During his career he had served as a Consultant to many government and non-government organizations, as well as being a member of several Advisory Committees in the Central Environmental Authority, Department of National Museums and the Sri Lanka Foundation. He has also served as the past president of Field Ornithology Group of Sri Lanka, Vice President of Ecotourism Society of Sri Lanka and member of the Society for Conservation Biology.

== Honors ==
He was awarded the "2003 Distinguished Service Award for Environment Education and Journalism" by the International Society for Conservation Biology and the endemic toad Duttaphrynus kotagamai is named after Kotagama for the honour. In 2017, he was award the title of Vidya Jyothi by the Government of Sri Lanka.

In 2019, a day gecko Cnemaspis kotagamai was named in honor of Kotagama.

== Writings ==
- Pictorial Pocket Guide 3 - Mammals in Sri Lanka - 2004
- An Illustrated guide to Birds of Sri Lanka (E-book)
