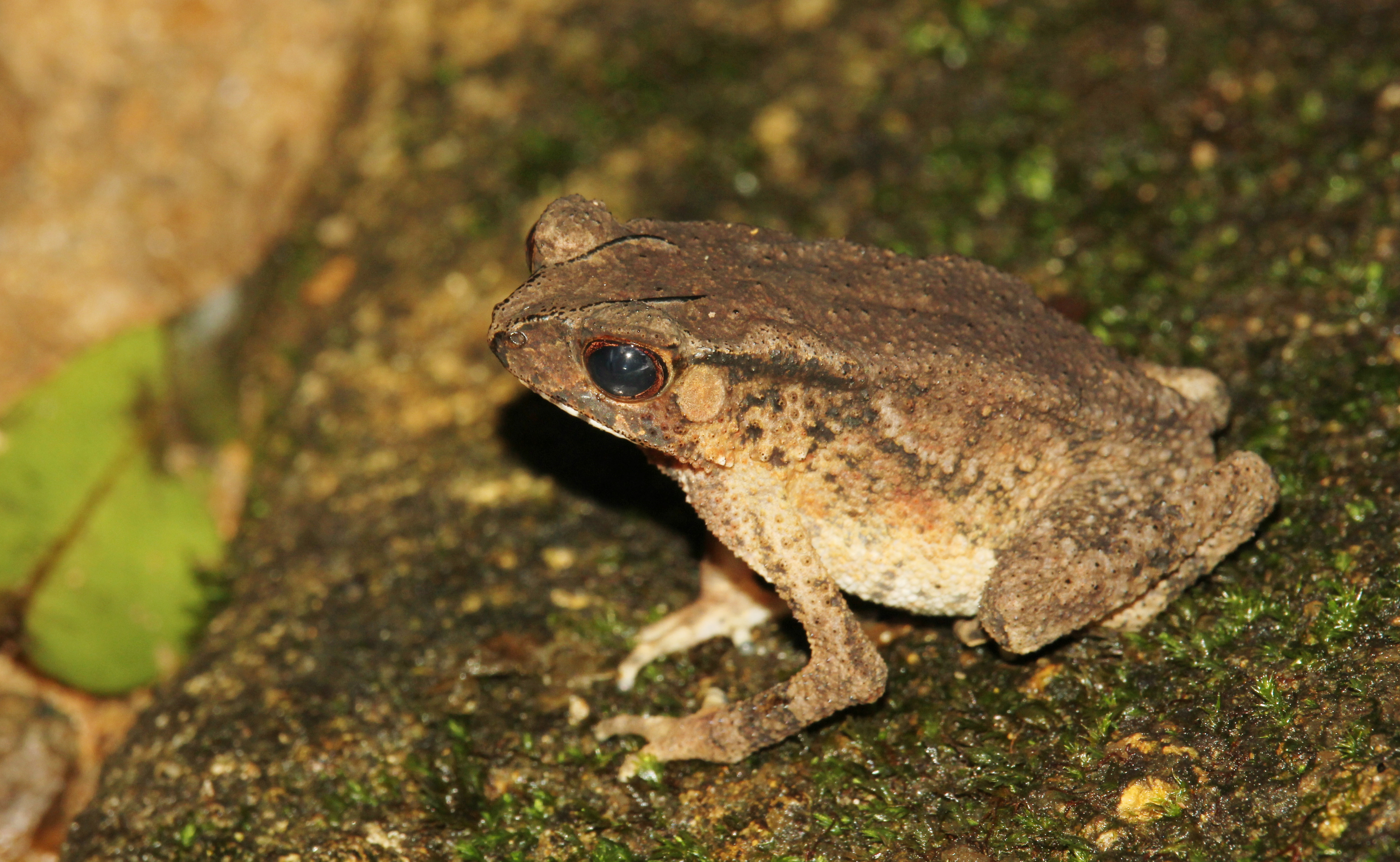

Conservation status
- Endangered (IUCN 3.1)

Scientific classification
- Kingdom: Animalia
- Phylum: Chordata
- Class: Amphibia
- Order: Anura
- Family: Bufonidae
- Genus: Duttaphrynus
- Species: D. kotagamai

Binomial name
- Duttaphrynus kotagamai Fernando & Dayawansa, 1994

Synonyms
- Bufo kotagamai Fernando & Dayawansa, 1994

= Duttaphrynus kotagamai =

Species of amphibian

Duttaphrynus kotagamai (Kotagama's dwarf toad) is a species of toad in the family Bufonidae endemic to Sri Lanka. Its natural habitats are tropical moist lowland forests, moist montane forests, and rivers. It is threatened by habitat loss. D. kotagamaii is named after Sarath Kotagama. A grown male is 33–40 mm in length, while a female reaches 55–63 mm. It is nocturnal, and lives commonly under rocks or decomposed leaves. It is found in Massena, Kitulgala, and Singharaja forests. Its diet consists of termites and grasshoppers. Its breeding biology has not been recorded, but it presumably takes place in water, probably in streams.

Habitat loss (small-scale agriculture) and human disturbance (local tourism) are the primary threats to this species. It is considered endangered by the IUCN.

The body is orangish with a pale color on the ventral surface. Side brown patches can be seen on occasion. Its skin is dry and has warts, and there are three pale stripes between the eyes.
