= Sumatra toad =

Conservation status
- Data Deficient (IUCN 3.1)

Scientific classification
- Kingdom: Animalia
- Phylum: Chordata
- Class: Amphibia
- Order: Anura
- Family: Bufonidae
- Genus: Duttaphrynus
- Species: D. sumatranus

Binomial name
- Duttaphrynus sumatranus (Peters, 1871)

Synonyms
- Bufo sumatranus Peters, 1871

Species of amphibian

The Sumatra toad (Duttaphrynus sumatranus) is a species of toad endemic to Sumatra, Indonesia, and only known from Lubuk Selasi. It has been found along a small, clear stream in secondary forest. It is locally common but listed as a critically endangered species due to a restricted range and continuing habitat loss (conversion of habitat into rice paddies, causing siltation of streams).
