= John Rennie Short =

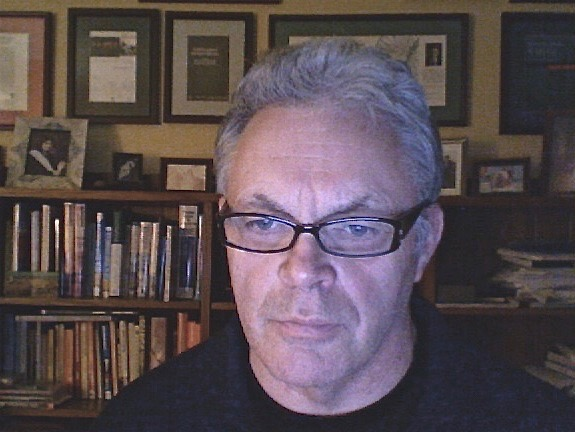
- Born: 19 October 1951 (age 75); Stirling, Scotland
- Citizenship: United Kingdom; United States
- Education: University of Aberdeen; University of Bristol
- Occupations: Geographer and writer
- Website: johnrennieshort.com

John Rennie Short is professor emeritus of geography and public policy in the School of Public Policy at University of Maryland, Baltimore County.

== Early life and education ==
Short was born in Stirling, Scotland. He was raised in nearby Tullibody, a village in the County of Clackmannanshire. He attended the county grammar school, Alloa Academy. He received the MA in geography from Aberdeen University in 1973. followed by a PhD in geography from the University of Bristol, with a received dissertation, "Residential Mobility in The Private Housing Market of Bristol" (1977). From 1976 to 1978, he was a postdoctoral research fellow in Bristol's School of Geographical Sciences.

== Career ==
In 1978, Short was appointed lecturer in geography at the University of Reading. From 1985 to 1987, he was also visiting senior research fellow at the Urban Research Unit of the Australian National University. He left Reading in 1990 to join Syracuse University's Maxwell School of Citizenship and Public Affairs as professor of geography. In 2002, he left Syracuse for an appointment as professor and chair of the Department of Geography and Environmental Systems at the University of Maryland, Baltimore County (UMBC). He was appointed to a professorship in the School of Public Policy at UMBC in 2005. He was awarded emeritus status in 2023.

Short has published in human geography's subfields, including the urban, the political, the environmental, the economic, and the cultural. His scholarship incorporates social and cultural theory methodologies, archival research strategies, and data analyses. Short's work has been presented on television in podcasts and radio interviews, print interviews in national and special newspapers and essays on scholarly/journalistic websites.

His work has been translated into many languages including Arabic, Bulgarian, Chinese, Czech, French, German, Italian, Japanese, Korean, Persian, Polish, Portuguese, Romanian, Spanish, and Turkish.

== Selected Awards ==
- 2024 Insurrection chosen as Book of the Year
- 2020 Fulbright ASEAN Research Fellowship
- 2009 Helen and John S. Best Fellowship American Geographical Society Library
- 2002 Leverhulme Professorship
- 2001 Alexander O. Vietor Fellowship Beinecke Library Yale University
- 2001 Frank Hideo Kono Visiting Fellowship Huntington Library
- 2000 Appleby-Mosher Research Award Maxwell School Syracuse University
- 1999 Dibner Library Fellowship Smithsonian Institution
- 1996 National Endowment for Humanities Fellowship Newberry Library
- 1996 Andrew Mellon Fellowship American Philosophical Society
- 1996 Appleby-Mosher Research Award Maxwell School Syracuse University
- 1995 Research Fellowship New York State Library
- 1990 Erasmus Professorship Groningen University
- 1985 Senior Visiting Research Fellowship Australian National University
- 1985 British Academy Visiting Fellowship Huntington Library
- 1976 Social Science Research Council Postdoctoral Fellowship

== Scholarship ==
Short's research papers contribute to four main areas of political economy.

The first is an exploration of urban society. Amongst many articles and book chapters, his work includes a long engagement with analysing housing dynamics to broader concerns with the pandemic and the city, generating models of metropolitan change, urban cultural economy, traffic issues, immigration, suburban change, the relationship between globalisation and cities, measuring the extent of globalisation in cities, urban flânerie, urban environmental issues, climate change, how city regions seek to reposition themselves in discursive space through branding campaigns and the hosting of the Olympic Games. More recent work has focused on social inclusion in cities and cities in the Global South including the rise of new middle class and the informal economy in the Colombian city of Cali.

A second body of work contributes to broader issues of cultural economy and politics. An influential text, Imagined Country first published in 1991 and reissued in 2005, was an important part of the cultural turn. In that book Short elaborated the idea of national environmental ideologies though the depictions of wilderness, countryside and city in landscape painting, cinema and novels. Other work focuses on globalisation, language, wealth, wealth and political power, and wealth and immigration.

A third contribution is to political geography and geopolitics. His work on the US includes analyses of elections, voting systems, gerrymandering, and legitimation crisis. Work on geopolitics includes issues in the East China and South China Seas. In 2020 he was awarded a Fulbright ASEAN Fellowship to research the geopolitics of the South China Sea. The results of this research were published in his 2025 book Hedging and Conflict in the South China Sea.

The fourth theme, mainly expressed in book form, is the history of cartography. Short builds upon and extends the work of the critical cartographic theorist John Brian Harley to deconstruct maps as social and political texts. Short explores the power dynamics in how the US and Korea were represented in maps, the creation of a spatial sensitivity in the early modern era, the role of indigenous people in so-called exploration and discovery of the New World, and the emergence of the national atlas as important feature of modern nationalism. He has also penned a general introduction to the subject.

He has promoted the publication of younger scholars’ work through editorship of three-book series Space Place and Society, Cities and Critical Introductions to Urbanism and the City.

He served on the inaugural editorial board of the journals Environment and Planning D: Society and Space. and Sustainability. He is on the board of Journal of Urban Affairs and Southeast Asia Development Research. He was the first chief editor of Social Inclusion in Cities.

=== Authored books ===
2027 The Spatial History of Empire. Anthem. ISBN 9781801362603.

2025 Hedging and Conflict in the South China Sea. Routledge. ISBN 9781032883427.

2024 Demography and the Making of The Modern World: Public Policies and Demographic Forces. Agenda. ISBN 9781788217064.

2024 Insurrection: What the January 6 Assault on America Reveals about America and Democracy. Reaktion. ISBN 9781789148411.

2024 Human Geography (3rd edition). Oxford University Press, (Co-authored with Lisa Benton-Short), ISBN 9780197662809.

2023 The Urban Now: Living in an Age of Urban Globalism. Edward Elgar. ISBN 9781035314447.

2022 The Rise and Fall of the National Atlas in the Twentieth Century. Anthem Press. ISBN 9781839983047.

2021 Geopolitics: Making Sense of a Changing Word. Rowman and Littlefield. ISBN 9781538135389.

2021 Stress Testing the USA: Public Policy and Reaction to Disaster Events (2nd edition). Palgrave Macmillan. ISBN 9783030659981.

2021 Housing in Britain: The Postwar Experience (reprinting of 1982 book). Routledge. ISBN 9780367744731.

2021 Housing and Residential Structure: Alternative Approaches (reprinting of 1980 book). Routledge. (Co-authored with Keith Bassett) ISBN 9780367756673.

2019 World Regional Geography. Oxford University Press. ISBN 9780190206703.

2018 The Unequal City: Urban Resurgence, Displacement and The Making of Inequality in Global Cities. Routledge, ISBN 9781138280366.

2018 Human Geography: A Short Introduction. (2nd ed.) Oxford University Press, ISBN 9780190679835.

2018 Hosting the Olympic Games: The Real Costs for Cities. Routledge, ISBN 9781138544963.

2018 A Regional Geography of the United States and Canada: Toward A Sustainable Future. Rowman and Littlefield, (Co-authored with Lisa Benton-Short and Chris Mayda), ISBN 9781138280366.

2014 Urban Theory (2nd ed.) Palgrave Macmillan. (Translated into Chinese and Persian), ISBN 9781137382658

2014 Human Geography A Short Introduction. Oxford University Press, ISBN 9780199925124.

2013 Stress Testing The USA: Public Policy and Reaction to Disaster Events. Palgrave Macmillan, ISBN 9781137327222.

2013 Cities and Nature (2nd ed.) Routledge (Co-authored with Lisa Benton-Short), ISBN 9780415625562.

2012 Korea: A Cartographic History. University of Chicago Press (Translated into Korean), ISBN 9780226753546

2012 Globalization, Modernity and The City. Routledge, ISBN 9780415676922.

2010 Cities and Suburbs: New Metropolitan Realities in the US. Routledge (Co-authored with B. Hanlon and T. Vicino), ISBN 9780415497312.

2009 Cartographic Encounters: Indigenous Peoples and The Exploration of The New World. Reaktion/University of Chicago Press, ISBN 9781861894366.

2008 Cities and Economy. Routledge (Co-authored with Y. Kim). (Translated into Persian), ISBN 9780415365741.

2008 Cities and Nature. Routledge (Co-authored with Lisa Benton-Short). ISBN 9780415355889.

2007 Liquid City: Megalopolis Revisited. Resources for The Future Press/Johns Hopkins University Press, ISBN 9781933115498.

2006 Alabaster Cities: Urban US Since 1950. Syracuse University Press, ISBN 9780815631057.

2006 Urban Theory. Palgrave Macmillan. (Translated into Chinese and Persian), ISBN 9781403906595

2005 Imagined Country. Syracuse University Press (Reprint with new introduction), ISBN 9780815629542.

2004 Making Space: Revisioning The World, 1475–1600. Syracuse University Press, ISBN 9780815630234.

2004 Global Metropolitan. Routledge. (Translated into Persian), ISBN 9780415305419.

2004 Representing the Republic. Reaktion/University of Chicago Press, ISBN 9781861890863.

2003 The World Through Maps. Firefly, ISBN 1552978117.

2001 Global Dimensions: Space, Place and The Contemporary World Reaktion University of Chicago Press (Translated into Chinese), ISBN 9781861891020.

2000 Alternative Geographies. Prentice Hall, ISBN 9781861890863.

1999 Globalization and The City. Addison Wesley Longman (Co-authored with Y. Kim) (Translated into Persian), ISBN 0582369126 (paperback).

1999 Environmental Discourses and Practice. Blackwell (Co-authored with L. M. Benton), ISBN 9780631211143.

1998 New Worlds, New Geographies. Syracuse University Press, ISBN 9780815605270.

1996 The Urban Order. Blackwell (Translated into Korean, Chinese and Persian), ISBN 9781557863614.

1993 An Introduction to Political Geography. Routledge (Second, revised and enlarged, edition) ISBN 9781138157019.

1991 Imagined Country: Environment, Culture and Society. Routledge, ISBN 0415038545.

1989 The Humane City. Blackwell (Translated into Korean, 2000), ISBN 9780631158233.

1986 Housebuilding, Planning and Community Action. Routledge (Co-authored with S. Fleming and S. Witt) ISBN 9780710207234.

1984 The Urban Arena. Macmillan ISBN 9780333361405.

1984 An Introduction to Urban Geography. Routledge ISBN 0710098928.

1982 Housing in Britain. Methuen ISBN 0416742904.

1982 An Introduction to Political Geography. RKP ISBN 0710009658.

1980 Urban Data Sources. Butterworths ISBN 0408106409.

1980 Housing and Residential Structure. Routledge. (Co-authored with K. Bassett), ISBN 9780710004406.

=== Edited books ===
2022 Pandemic and The City: Urban Issues in the Context of COVID-19. (Guest Editor).

2019 Assessing The New Urban Agenda. (Guest Editor).

2017 A Research Agenda for Cities. Edward Elgar Agendas (Editor), ISBN 9781785363412.

2008 The Sage Companion to The City. Sage (Co-edited with T. Hall and P. Hubbard), ISBN 9781412902076.

2002 Globalization and The Margins. Palgrave (Co-edited with R. Grant),ISBN 9780333964316.

2000 Environmental Discourses and Practice: A Reader. Blackwell (Co-edited with L. M. Benton),ISBN 0631216367.

1992 Human Settlement. Oxford University Press (Editor), ISBN 0195209443.

1985 Developing Contemporary Marxism. Macmillan (Co-edited with Z. Baranski), ISBN 0312196598.

1984 The Human Geography of Contemporary Britain. Macmillan (Co-edited with A. Kirby), ISBN 0333373162.

== Personal ==
Short's partner is Prof. Lisa Benton-Short, a geographer at George Washington University in Washington DC.

=== See also ===
- Cultural turn
- Spatial turn
