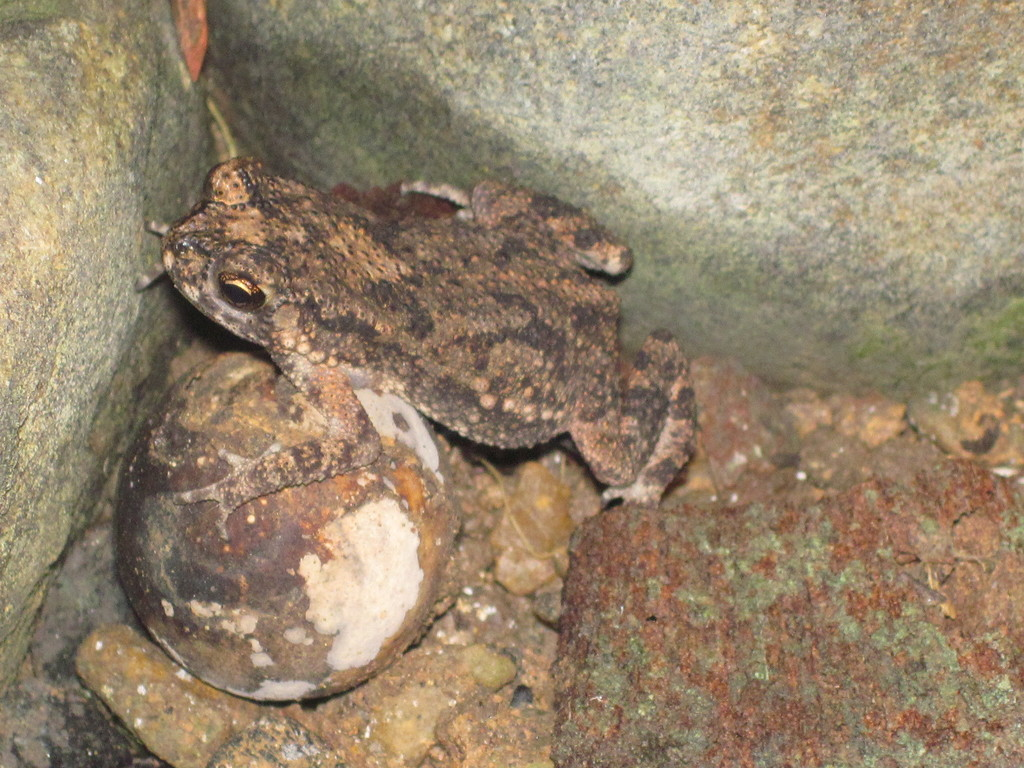

Conservation status
- Critically Endangered (IUCN 3.1)

Scientific classification
- Kingdom: Animalia
- Phylum: Chordata
- Class: Amphibia
- Order: Anura
- Family: Bufonidae
- Genus: Duttaphrynus
- Species: D. noellerti

Binomial name
- Duttaphrynus noellerti (Manamendra-Arachchi and Pethiyagoda, 1998)

Synonyms
- Bufo noellerti Manamendra-Arachchi and Pethiyagoda, 1998

= Duttaphrynus noellerti =

Species of amphibian

Duttaphrynus noellerti (common name: Noellert's toad) is a species of toads in the family Bufonidae. It is endemic to the rainforests of southwestern Sri Lanka. It is named after Andreas Nöllert, a German herpetologist and photographer who first noted the distinctiveness of the species.

== Description ==
Mature males measure 50–62 mm (2.0–2.4 in) and females 80–89 mm (3.1–3.5 in) in snout–vent length. The head has many ridges (the supratympanic ridge being wider than the others) and is covered above and on the sides with smooth warts with melanic spinules; also, the parotoid glands have such warts. The body and the limbs are covered by spinous warts. The dorsum and sides are reddish-ash or reddish-brown, marbled with dark brown. A well-defined dark patch runs from behind the tympanic region and continues onto the flanks and upper surfaces of limbs.

== Habitat and conservation ==
D. noellerti is an uncommon terrestrial toad found in and around tropical lowland moist forest at elevations of 61–460 m (200–1,509 ft) above sea level. Adults have been recorded from rubber plantations, tea estates, and domestic gardens, but only close to the forest edge. It is threatened by habitat loss caused by selective logging and agrochemical pollution. It is found in the Kanneliya Forest Reserve, Gilimale-Eratne Forest Reserve, and Sinharaja Forest Reserve.
