= Duttaphrynus crocus =

Conservation status
- Vulnerable (IUCN 3.1)

Scientific classification
- Kingdom: Animalia
- Phylum: Chordata
- Class: Amphibia
- Order: Anura
- Family: Bufonidae
- Genus: Duttaphrynus
- Species: D. crocus

Binomial name
- Duttaphrynus crocus (Wogan, Win, Thin, Lwin, Shein, Kyi & Tun, 2003)

Synonyms
- Bufo croc us Wogan, Win, Thin, Lwin, Shein, Kyi & Tun, 2003

Species of amphibian

Duttaphrynus crocus is a species of toad in the family Bufonidae. It is endemic to Rakhine State, Myanmar. Its natural habitat is primary evergreen forest. It is threatened by habitat loss (logging).
