= Appomattox campaign order of battle =

The order of battle for the Appomattox campaign includes:

- Appomattox campaign order of battle: Union
- Appomattox campaign order of battle: Confederate
