= Ampara Hospital =

- Ministry of Health, Sri Lanka
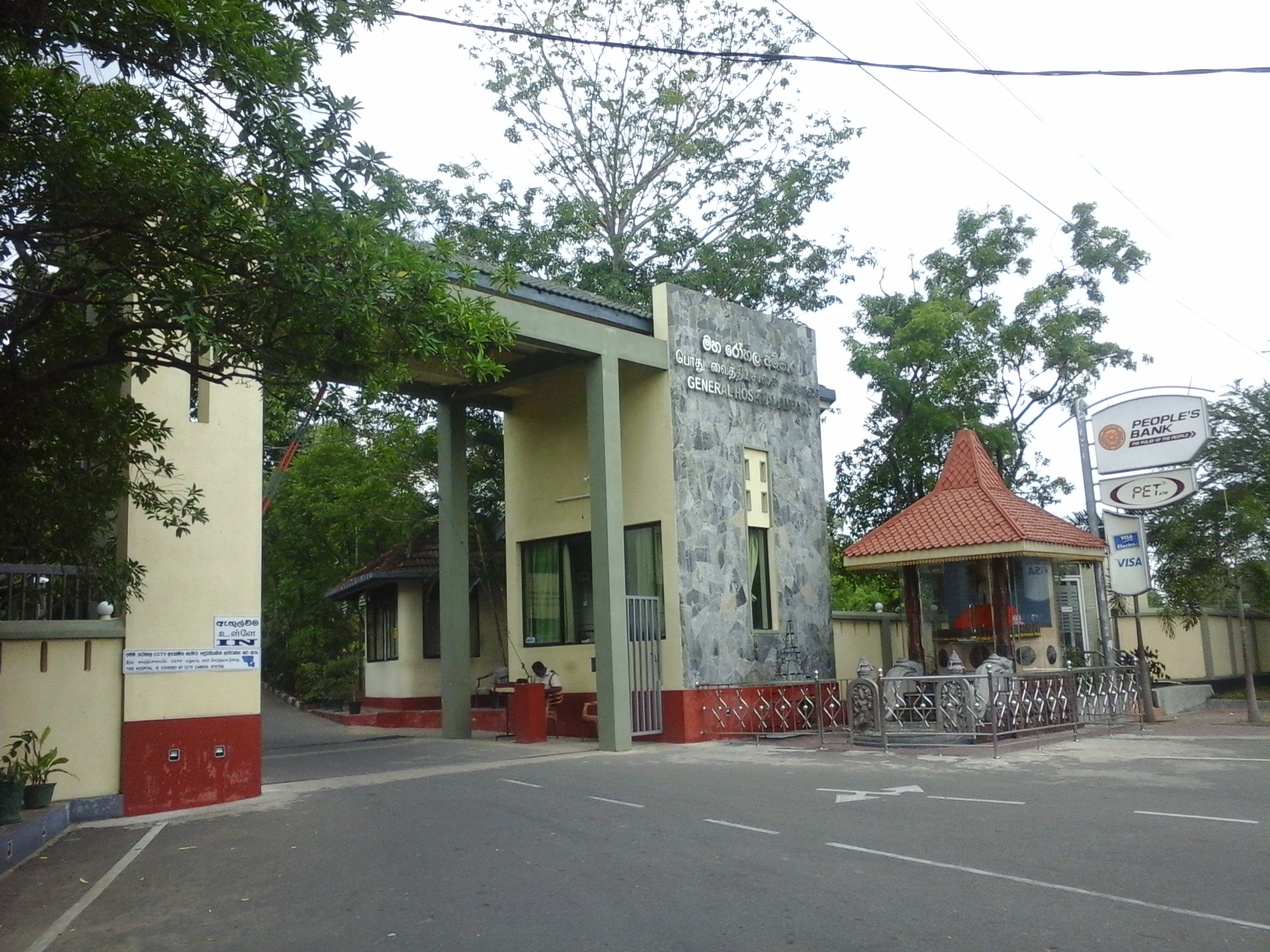

Geography
- Location: Ampara, Ampara District, Eastern Province, Sri Lanka
- Coordinates: 7°17′56.20″N 81°41′23.80″E

Organisation
- Care system: Public

Services
- Beds: 476

Links
- Website: ghampara.gov.lk
- Lists: Hospitals in Sri Lanka

Ampara Hospital is a government hospital in Ampara, Sri Lanka. It is controlled by the central government in Colombo. As of 2010 it had 476 beds. The hospital is sometimes called Ampara General Hospital or Ampara District General Hospital.
