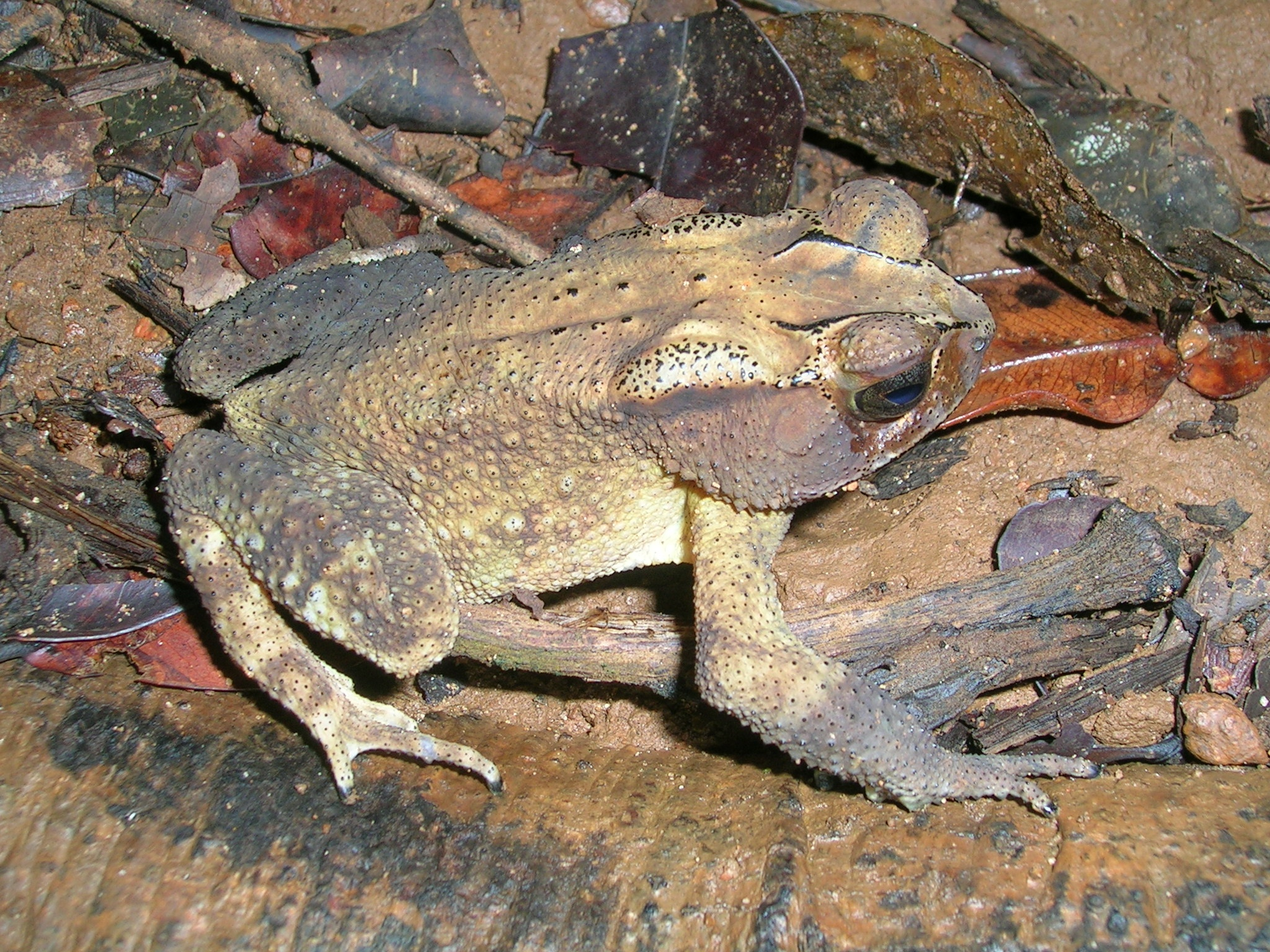

Conservation status
- Least Concern (IUCN 3.1)

Scientific classification
- Kingdom: Animalia
- Phylum: Chordata
- Class: Amphibia
- Order: Anura
- Family: Bufonidae
- Genus: Duttaphrynus
- Species: D. parietalis

Binomial name
- Duttaphrynus parietalis (Boulenger, 1882)

Synonyms
- Bufo parietalis (Boulenger, 1882)

= Duttaphrynus parietalis =

Indian toad

Species of amphibian

Duttaphrynus parietalis, commonly known as the Indian toad or ridged toad, is a species of toad found in the Western Ghats of India.

== Description ==
Head with very prominent ridges, namely a canthal, a slight preorbital, a supraorbital, a postorbital, a parietal, and an orbitotympanic; parietal ridges obliquely directed inwards; snout short, blunt; interorbital space broader than the upper eyelid; tympanum distinct, two thirds the diameter of the eye. First finger extending beyond second; toes half webbed, with single subarticular tubercles; two moderate metatarsal tubercles; no tarsal fold. The tarsometatarsal articulation reaches between the eye and the tip of the snout. Upper surfaces covered with irregular warts; parotoids moderately elongate, elliptical, very prominent. Uniform brown above; beneath marbled with brown. Male with a subgular vocal sac.
