= Maxwell School =

- SMK Maxwell
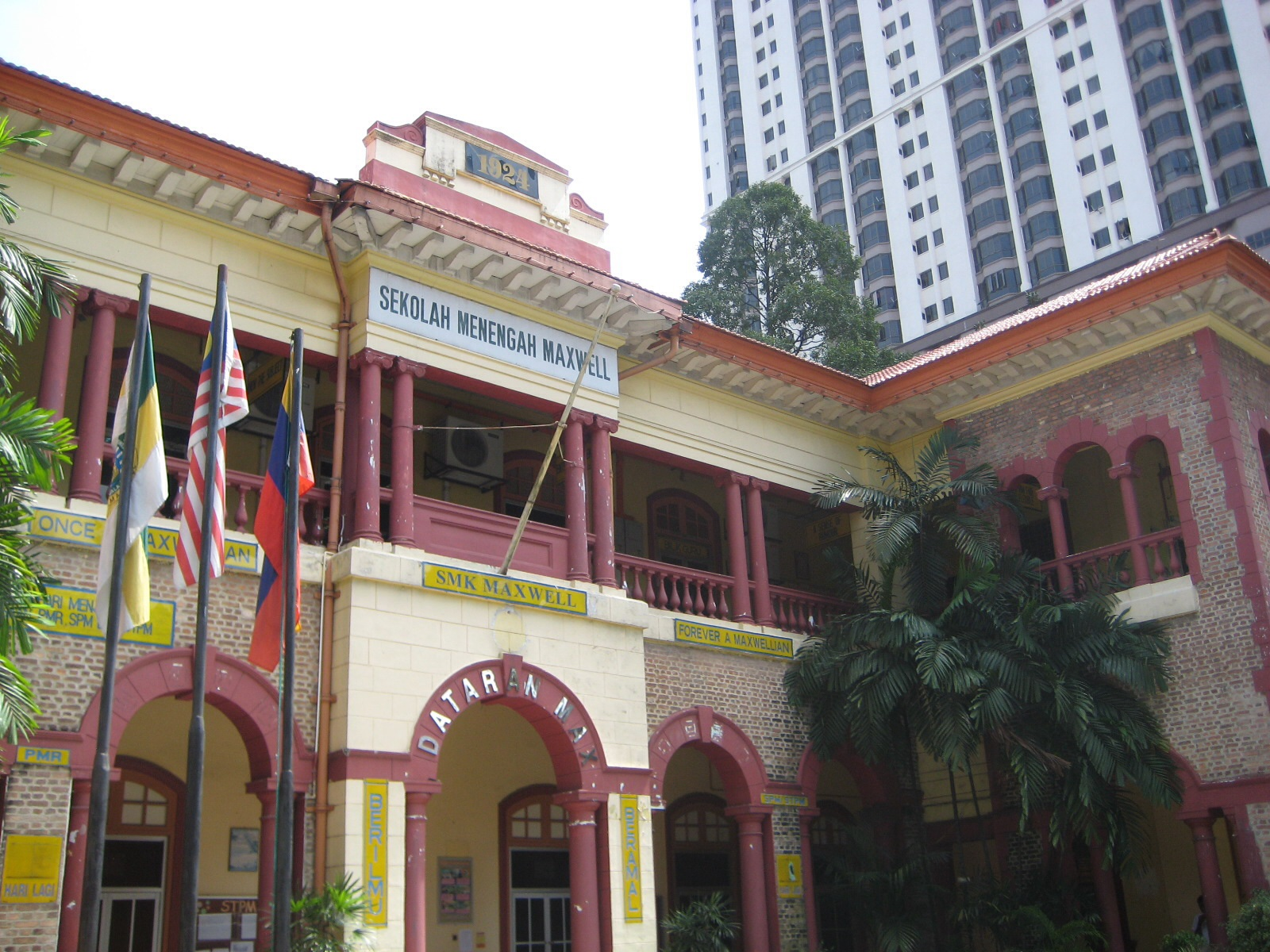
- Maxwell School

Location
- Jalan Tun Ismail; Kuala Lumpur, 50480; Malaysia

Information
- School type: All-boys secondary school
- Motto: Latin: Disco Ut Serviam; English: I Learn That I May Serve; Malay: Berilmu, Beramal
- Established: 1916
- Status: Operational
- School district: Dang Wangi
- Principal: Ravi Chandran a/l Krishnan
- Grades: Form 1–6
- Gender: Male: Form 1-5; Co-ed: Form 6
- Campus: Small school campus, at the edge of the city centre
- Campus type: Urban
- Houses: Thamboosamy (red); Swettenham (green); Yap Ah Loy (blue); Sulaiman (yellow)
- Colors: Royal Green, Yellow, Blue and White
- Yearbook: The Burning Tiger
- Affiliations: Malaysia Ministry Of Education
- Slogan: Maxwell, Hebat! & Maxwell Dihatiku.
- Alumni: Maxwellian Old Boys' Association www.maxwelloba.com.my

Maxwell School (Malay: Sekolah Menengah Kebangsaan Maxwell) is an all-boys secondary school, located north of Kuala Lumpur. Established in 1916, the school is believed to be the oldest school in north of Kuala Lumpur as well as one of the oldest in Kuala Lumpur and Malaysia. Both current students and alumnus are known as a Maxwellian. A centennial ceremony, celebrating the school's 100th anniversary since its establishment, was held on 30 September 2017.

== Campus ==
The school has remained on its original site. It originally consisted of two blocks, the present day main block and the gymnasium block, which now is a meeting room. The design and features of the two blocks are typical of colonial era structures and bear some similarities with the railway station and Sultan Abdul Samad buildings, both of which have Moorish architecture. The school was later extended to a block of solid masonry construction with arched openings along the corridors. There is a veranda on both sides of each storey of the main block, high ceilings and broad stairways. The 'H' shape of the main block is locally a distinctive feature. The school since have expanded, and now the school has two additional main blocks. The first of which are located behind the original 1917 block, housing most of the classrooms and laboratories, and a new 6-storey tower that houses most of the Form Sixth classrooms and the school library.

== History ==
Maxwell School was established in 1916, and named after a road in honour of Sir William George Maxwell. It opened its doors to 110 students and five teaching staff on 1 June 1922. During its pre-war days, it functioned as a feeder school (primary school) to the Victoria Institution. By 1933, the school was shut down to the public due to the recession, but was opened as a private school from 1934 to 1938. It was then given to the Trade School for their use.

During the Japanese Occupation, it was used as a camp for the Japanese Kempeitai. After the war, the school was used as a hostel by the newly formed Technical College until 1953, when, in September, the school was re-opened as Malaya's first modern secondary school. Today, the Maxwell School is still housed in the same building and has remained a secondary school ever since.

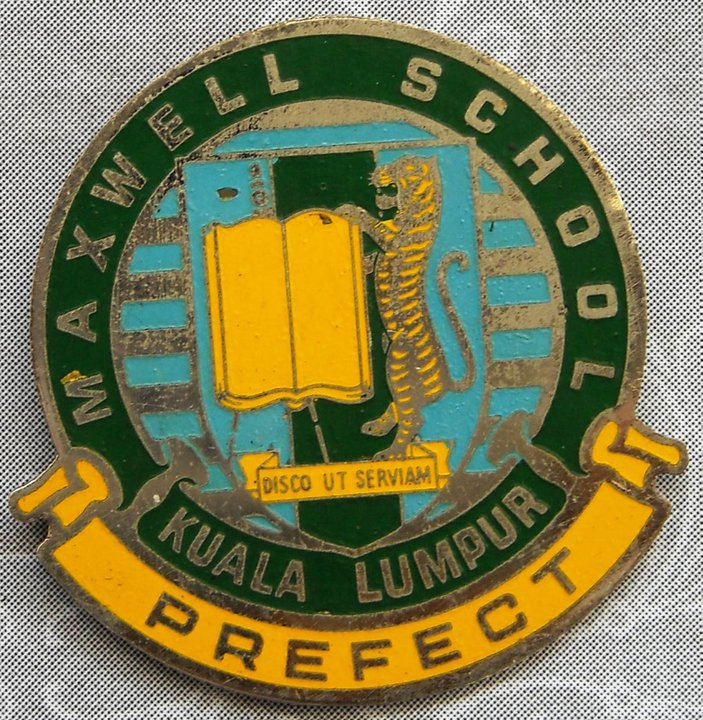
Sample of Head Prefects, Maxwell School

== Alumni ==
The alumni association of the school is the Maxwell School Old Boys' Association. It was established in 1956, de-registered in 1983 and was registered again on 13 February 1999. The OBA has a newsletter known as Berita O'Max, issued quarterly.

Notable alumni include:

- Syed Hamid Albar, Former Home Minister of Malaysia
- Zainal Abidin Hassan, former national football player
- Selvadurai Mahalingam, won the Punjab University Field Hockey championship after 27 years for King Edward Medical College.
- Yaacob Latiff, second Mayor of Kuala Lumpur
