= Battle of Petersburg =

Battle of Petersburg may refer to:

- Siege of Petersburg, or the Richmond–Petersburg campaign, occurring in and near Petersburg, Virginia from June 9, 1864, to March 25, 1865, during the American Civil War
  - First Battle of Petersburg, June 9, 1864
  - Second Battle of Petersburg, June 15–18, 1864
- Third Battle of Petersburg, April 2, 1865, at the beginning of the Appomattox campaign
- Battle of Blandford, also known as the Battle of Petersburg, April 25, 1781, during the American Revolutionary War

== See also ==
- Battle of Petersburg order of battle (disambiguation)
- Petersburg (disambiguation)
