= Siege of Petersburg order of battle =

Forces at the 1864 to 1865 Siege of Petersburg

The order of battle for the Siege of Petersburg includes:

- Siege of Petersburg order of battle: Confederate
- Siege of Petersburg order of battle: Union
