= List of University of Jaffna people =

The following is a list people associated with the University of Jaffna, including its predecessor, the Jaffna Campus of the University of Sri Lanka.

== Chancellors, vice-chancellors and presidents ==
Presidents of the Jaffna Campus of the University of Sri Lanka
President	Took office	Left office
K. Kailasapathy	1 August 1974	31 July 1977
S. Vithiananthan	1 August 1977	31 December 1978

Chancellors of the University of Jaffna
Chancellor	Took office	Left office
V. Manicavasagar	1979	1984
T. Nadaraja	1984	2004
M. Sivasuriya	2004	2014
S. Pathmanathan	2014	2025
R. Kumaravadivel	2025	

Vice-chancellors of the University of Jaffna
Vice-chancellor	Took office	Left office
S. Vithiananthan	January 1979	July 1988
A. Thurairajah	September 1988	April 1994
K. Kunaratnam	April 1994	February 1997
P. Balasundarampillai	February 1997	April 2003
S. Mohanadas	April 2003	March 2006
S. Mohanadas (acting)	March 2006	
R. Kumaravadivel (acting)	June 2006	December 2007
N. Shanmugalingam	December 2007	March 2011
Vasanthy Arasaratnam	March 2011	April 2017
R. Vigneswaran	April 2017	6 May 2019
S. Srisatkunarajah	August 2020	

== Academics ==
- Srikanthalakshmi Arulanandam - Principle Librarian
- P. Balasundarampillai - professor of geography, dean of the Faculty of Arts and vice-chancellor
- Sucharitha Gamlath - professor of Sinhala and dean of the Faculty of Arts
- K. Indrapala - professor of history and dean of the Faculty of Arts
- W. L. Jeyasingham - associate professor of geography, head of the Department of Geography and dean of the Faculty of Arts
- P. Kanagasabapathy - professor of mathematics, head of the Department of Mathematics and Statistics and dean of the Faculty of Science
- R. Kumaravadivel - Emeritus Professor of Physics, Chancellor, acting Vice-Chancellor, Dean of the Faculty of Science, Head of the Department of Physics and Head of the Computer Unit
- K. Kunaratnam - emeritus professor of physics, head of the Department of Physics, head of the Department of Computer Science, dean of the Faculty of Science and vice-chancellor
- S. Mohanadas - dean of the Faculty of Agriculture
- M. Nadarajasundaram - senior lecturer, head of the Department of Commerce and Management Studies, dean of the Faculty of Management Studies and Commerce
- S. Selvanayagam - head of the Department of Geography
- M. Sivasuriya - professor of obstetrics and gynaecology, head of the Department of Obstetrics and Gynaecology and chancellor.
- K. Sivathamby - emeritus professor and head of the Department of Fine Arts
- Rajini Thiranagama - head of the Department of Anatomy

== Alumni ==
- S. Jebanesan - Church of South India Bishop of Jaffna
- M. Nadarajasundaram - Dean of the Faculty of Management Studies and Commerce
- Jude Perera - member of the Victorian Legislative Assembly
- Joseph Ponniah - Roman Catholic Bishop of Batticaloa
- R. Sivagurunathan - editor of Thinakaran
- S. Sritharan - Member of Parliament for Jaffna District
- Chelvy Thiyagarajah - poet and International PEN award winner
