= Ratnajeevan Hoole =

Sri Lankan Tamil engineer and academic (born 1952)

Professor Ratnajeevan Hoole
- ரத்னஜீவன் ஹூல்
- Born: 15 September 1952 (age 74)
- Other name: Jeevan Hoole
- Education: University of London
- Occupation: Academic

Professor Samuel Ratnajeevan Herbert Hoole (born 15 September 1952; commonly known as Ratnajeevan Hoole) is a Sri Lankan Tamil engineer and academic. He was a member of the Election Commission of Sri Lanka.

== Early life and family ==
Hoole was born on 15 September 1952. He is the son of Rev. Richard Herbert Ratnathurai Hoole and Jeevamany Somasundaram. He was educated at Nallur CMS Practising School and St. John's College, Jaffna. He was offered a position to study at the University of Ceylon, Peradeniya in 1970 but as there were too many Tamil students at Peradeniya he was transferred to the Ceylon College of Technology, graduating from the University of Sri Lanka Katubedda campus in 1975 with a B.Sc degree in electrical engineering. He received a M.Sc. in electrical machines and power systems from the University of London in 1977 and a Ph.D. in electromagnetic field computation from Carnegie Mellon University in 1983. In 1993 he received a D.Sc. in computational electromagnetics from the University of London.

Hoole is married to Dushyanthi Hoole, a fellow academic from the Michigan State University. They have three daughters (Mariyahl Mahilmany, Elisapeththu Elilini and Annahl Anbini) and a son (Yovahn Yesuraiyan Ratnajeevan). He is the brother of Rajan Hoole. Hoole is a Christian and a member of the Church of Ceylon. He holds dual Sri Lankan and US citizenship.

== Career ==
Hoole was an instructor in electrical engineering at University of Sri Lanka Katubedda campus for a brief period in 1975 before moving to Singapore in 1976 to work as an engineer for an engineering consultancy firm. He was a lecturer in electrical engineering at The Polytechnic, Ibadan between 1977 and 1980. In 1981 he was a Westinghouse Intern and a teaching assistant at McGill University and in 1982 he was a graduate assistant at Carnegie Mellon University. Hoole worked for PA Consulting Services between 1983 and 1984 before joining Drexel University in September 1984 as an assistant professor of electrical and computer engineering. He joined Harvey Mudd College in July 1987 as an associate professor before being promoted to professor in January 1992. He took sabbatical leave from 1993 to 1994 to be a senior fellow at the National University of Singapore. Hoole left Harvey Mudd College in 1997 to work as a visiting professor at the Institute of Fundamental Studies, Kandy (1997) and as UNESCO professor of information technology (1998–99).

In July 1999 Hoole returned to Sri Lanka to work as a professor of electrical and information engineering at the University of Ruhuna. He joined the University of Peradeniya in December 1999 as a professor, becoming senior professor in 2003. He served as the head of the Department of Computer Science within the Faculty of Engineering (now Computer Engineering) during 2000-2001 period. Between 2003 and 2006 he was also a member of the University Grants Commission. Hoole was involved with the Citizens' Movement for Good Governance (CIMOGG) which took legal action against unfair university appointments and cheating. This led to him being threatened with disciplinary action by the University of Peradeniya authorities.

In January 2006 the senate of the University of Jaffna elected Hoole to be one of three nominees to be the university's vice-chancellor. In March 2006 President Mahinda Rajapaksa appointed Hoole as vice-chancellor. As soon as he was appointed Hoole started receiving threats from various Liberation Tigers of Tamil Eelam (LTTE) fronts including the People's Uprising Force who said he would return home "headless in a box" if he took up the position. Hoole did not assume his duties on 15 March 2006 and his predecessor S. Mohanadas was appointed acting vice-chancellor. Hoole chose instead to work from outside Jaffna, appointing a deputy vice-chancellor and a head of Vavuniya campus. As the threats continued Hoole and his family left Sri Lanka 20 April 2006.

Hoole was visiting professor at Michigan State University (2006) and Drexel University (2006-08). He was professor of engineering and science at the Rensselaer Polytechnic Institute between 2008 and 2010.

Hoole returned to Sri Lanka in September 2010 to co-ordinate the establishment of the University of Jaffna's new Faculty of Engineering. In December 2010 the senate of the University of Jaffna once again elected Hoole to be one of three nominees to be the university's vice-chancellor. However, this time President Rajapaksa did not appoint him vice-chancellor, choosing instead Vasanthy Arasaratnam.

During the 2011 local government elections in Sri Lanka Hoole documented and reported on violations of electoral law by the Eelam People's Democratic Party, a government backed paramilitary group led by government minister Douglas Devananda. After Devananda complained to the police about the "defamatory article", Hoole gave a statement to the police on 2 August 2011. On 4 August 2011 the police summoned him to appear at Kayts magistrates court the following day, telling him that he may be remanded. Hoole did not attend the magistrate but instead sent his lawyer N. Srikantha. The magistrate found Hoole to be in contempt for not attending in person and issued a warrant for his arrest if he did not attend the court on 15 August 2011. Fearing detention in Kayts, Hoole fled Sri Lanka for a second time.

Hoole is a fellow of the Institute of Electrical and Electronics Engineers and chartered engineer. In 2012, Hoole held a professor affiliation at the department of electrical engineering at Michigan State University.
