= R. Kumaravadivel =

Sri Lankan theoretical physicist

Emeritus Professor Rajaratnam Kumaravadivel இராசரத்தினம் குமாரவடிவேல்

5th Chancellor, University of Jaffna
- In office August 2025 – present

Acting Vice-chancellor University of Jaffna
- In office June 2006 – December 2007

Dean Faculty of Science, University of Jaffna
- In office November 1999 – July 2010

Academic background
- Education: University of Ceylon (BSc); University of Bristol (PhD)
- Thesis: Theory of Thermodynamic Properties of Liquid Metals (1975)

Academic work
- Discipline: Theoretical Physics
- Institutions: University of Peradeniya; University of Jaffna

Rajaratnam Kumaravadivel is a Sri Lankan Tamil and Emeritus Professor of theoretical physics. He was the former dean of the Faculty of Science, University of Jaffna, former acting Vice-chancellor and the current Chancellor of the University of Jaffna.

== Early life ==
Kumaravadivel joined the University of Ceylon, graduating in 1967 with first class honours BSc degree and winning the Coomarasamy Prize for Science. He was also the first person to receive both a first class honours degree specialising in physics (1970) and the Hewavitharana memorial prize for best performance in Physics from the University of Ceylon at Peradeniya. He then received a PhD degree in physics from the University of Bristol in 1975 after producing a thesis titled Theory of Thermodynamic Properties of Liquid Metals.

== Career ==
Kumaravadivel served as a lecturer and head of the Department of Physics at Peradeniya Campus of the University of Sri Lanka between January 1978 and January 1979. Whilst at Peradeniya, he helped in conducting final year Physics undergraduate lectures for the newly formed Department of Physics at the University of Jaffna. Jaffna being his hometown, he later settled there and joined the University of Jaffna as one of the founding professors of the Department of Physics. During his tenure, Kumaravadivel took different administrative roles and contributed immensely to the growth of the department. He served as Head of the Department of Physics for three terms: February 1985 to February 1988; March 1991 to June 1991; and April 1994 to November 1999, steering the department through the difficult times of the ethnic conflict in Sri Lanka. He led the Computer Unit (computing facility) at the University from August 1989 to October 1990, during its formative years.

Kumaravadivel also held several international fellowships. He was appointed as an associate member of the International Center for Theoretical Physics from 1982 to 1987 and 1989–1995 and a visiting scientist at the same institute from 1983 to 1984. He obtained a Commonwealth fellowship to work as a visiting professor at the Cavendish Laboratory, University of Cambridge in 1990.

Kumaravadivel later was the Dean of the Faculty of Science from November 1999 to July 2010. He was the University Grants Commission (Sri Lanka) nominee for the Vice-Chancellorship of the University of Jaffna for three consecutive times – in 2000, 2003 and 2006. He was appointed as acting Vice-Chancellor of the University between June 2006 and December 2007 after the nominee Ratnajeevan Hoole did not take up his post. After retirement Kumaravadivel served as the member of the University Grants Commission from May 2015 -January 2020. He is currently an Emeritus Professor of Physics and in August 2025, appointed the Chancellor of University of Jaffna
