= S. Vithiananthan =

Sri Lankan academic

- Born: 8 May 1924
- Died: 22 January 1989 (aged 64)
- Education: University of Ceylon; School of Oriental and African Studies
- Occupation: Academic
- Title: Vice-Chancellor of the University of Jaffna
- Term: January 1979 – July 1988
- Successor: A. Thurairajah

Suppiramaniam Vithiananthan (8 May 1924 – 22 January 1989) was a Sri Lankan writer, academic and the first vice-chancellor of the University of Jaffna.

== Early life and family ==
Vithiananthan was born on 8 May 1924. He was the son of Suppiramaniam, a proctor from Tellippalai in northern Ceylon. He was educated at St. John's College, Jaffna. After school he joined the Ceylon University College in 1941. He graduated from the University of Ceylon in 1944 with an honours degree.

Vithiananthan married Kamala. They had five children: Arulnamby, Mahilnangai, Anbu Chelvi, Inpa Chelvan and Siva Mainthan.

== Career ==
After university Vithiananthan worked as a lecturer at the University of Ceylon. He was sub-warden of Jayatileka Hall and warden of Wijewardene Hall at the University of Ceylon.

Vithiananthan then joined School of Oriental and African Studies for post graduate studies, obtaining a Phd in 1950 after producing a thesis titled Pattupattu – a Historical, Social and Linguistic Study.

After returning to Ceylon Vithiananthan re-joined the University of Ceylon. The Faculty of Arts and Oriental Studies moved to Peradeniya and Vithiananthan was made Professor of Tamil in 1952. He served as Head of the Department of Tamil at the university. He served as president of the Jaffna Campus of the University of Sri Lanka between August 1977 and December 1978. The Jaffna Campus was elevated to university status on 1 January 1979 with the creation of the University of Jaffna and Vithiananthan was appointed the first vice-chancellor of the new university. He held the position until July 1988. During his tenure the university underwent serious difficulties due to the civil war. Vithiananthan kept the university open during the 1987–89 JVP Insurrection which forced every other university in the country to close.

== Death ==
Vithiananthan died on 22 January 1989.
