= A. Arulpiragasam =

Ceylonese civil servant

A. Arulpiragasam OBE
- Born: c. 1890
- Died: 1975
- Occupation: Civil servant

Arumugam Arulpiragasam, OBE (also spelt Arulpragasam) (c. 1890 –1975) was a leading Ceylonese civil servant and Commissioner of Elections.

== Early life ==
Arulpiragasam was born around 1890. He was the son of Arumugam, a schoolmaster from Valveddi in northern British Ceylon. He was educated at Udupiddy American Mission College, Jaffna College, Vaddukoddai.

Arulpiragasam married Sathyabaladevi, daughter of Kandiah from Udupiddy. They had three sons (Pulendran, Thavendran and Balendran) and four daughters (Saraswathi, Savitri, Thilakavathy and Punithavathy).

== Career ==
Arulpiragasam joined the Government Clerical Service in May 1920 and served till September 1933, during which time he qualified as an advocate. In October 1933, he became a legal and deeds clerk to the Land Commissioner from October 1935, deeds assistant to the Land Commissioner and served as Assistant Land Commissioner from June 1941 to September 1942. He was appointed a class III officer of the Ceylon Civil Service in October 1942 and was attached to the General Treasury and was appointed again as Assistant Land Commissioner from December 1942 to May 1943. Promoted to class II after completing his first and second regulation exams, he served as the Office Assistant, Colombo Kachcheri; Supervisor, Food Control Branch; Additional Assistant Government Agent, Colombo; Assistant Government Agent in Colombo, Puttalam and Kurunegala. Joint Commissioner of the Colombo Plan Exhibition. He went on to serve in numerous senior civil servant positions including Registrar General (1952), Government Agent, North-Western Province and Commissioner of Elections (1955–57). He also held a senior position at Lake House Newspapers.

Arulpiragasam was made a Member of the Order of the British Empire in the 1953 New Year Honours. He was made an Officer of the Order of the British Empire in the 1954 Birthday Honours.

Arulpiragasam died in 1975.
