= S. Pathmanathan =

- சி. பத்மநாதன்

4th Chancellor of the University of Jaffna
- Preceded by: M. Sivasuriya

Personal details
- Born: 20 March 1940 (age 86) Araly, Ceylon
- Education: Jaffna College; University of Ceylon; University of London
- Profession: Academic

Professor Sivasubramaniam Pathmanathan (Tamil: சிவசுப்பிரமணியம் பத்மநாதன், romanized: Civacuppiramaṇiyam patmanātaṉ; born 20 March 1940) is a Sri Lankan Tamil historian, academic, author and former chancellor of the University of Jaffna.

== Early life and family ==
Pathmanathan was born on 20 March 1940 in Araly in northern Ceylon. He is the son of Sivasubramaniam, a teacher at Vaddukoddai Hindu College, and Sivapakkiyam. He was educated at Jaffna College. After school he joined the University of Ceylon, Peradeniya from where he received a BA special degree in history in 1963.

Pathmanathan in married to Pathmaleela. They have three sons (Hariharan, Sriharan and Sivasankar) and two daughters (Sudharshni and Sivadharshni).

== Career ==
Pathmanathan joined the University of Ceylon, Peradeniya in 1963 as an assistant lecturer in history. He was promoted to lecturer (1969), senior lecturer (1975) and associate professor (1981). In 1969 he received a Ph.D in South Asian history from the University of London. He was also a visiting lecturer of history/Hindu civilisation at the University of Ceylon, Colombo (1970–72) and visiting lecturer of history University of Sri Lanka Vidyalankara campus (1975–77). He joined the University of Jaffna in 1986 as professor of history, serving until 2004. He returned to the University of Peradeniya as professor of history in 1995, serving until 2006. He was head of the Department of History at Peradeniya between 2001 and 2002. He was a visiting professor at the University of Cologne's Institute of Indology and Tamil Studies (2003–04) and Uppsala University (2004). He retired in May 2006.

After retirement Pathmanathan became an emeritus professor of history at University of Peradeniya. He was a visiting professor at Eastern University, Sri Lanka (2007–08) where he helped establish the Hindu Civilisation discipline. In 2008 he served as a consultant in Hindu studies at the South Eastern University of Sri Lanka. He later became chancellor of the University of Jaffna.

Pathmanathan has served in various positions including vice chairman of the University Grants Commission (1994–99) and a member of the National Education Commission (1991-2001). He was a consultant to the Ministry of Hindu Affairs between 2002 and 2003. Pathmanathan was awarded the Sri Lanka Sikhamani title in the 2017 Sri Lankan national honours.

In 2026, Pathmanathan published *Glimpses of an Ancient Civilisation: Society and Culture in Jaffna (300 BC to AD 500)*, which examines the society and culture of early Jaffna from 300 BC to AD 500. A review by Jehan Perera described the work as a significant contribution to the study of Sri Lanka’s early history, particularly in its analysis of settlement patterns, cultural developments, and links with South India.

== Works ==
Pathmanathan is a prolific writer — he has written/edited several books and authored dozens of papers.

- The Vanniyar (Tamil) (1970, Peradeniya)
- The Kingdom of Jaffna, Part 1 (Circa A.D. 1250-1450) (1978, Arul M. Rajendran)
- The Laws and Customs of the Sri Lankan Tamils (Tamil) (2001, Kumaran Press)
- Hindu Culture in Sri Lanka, Volume 1: Temple Art & Architecture (editor) (Tamil) (2001, Department of Hindu Religious & Cultural Affairs, Sri Lanka)
- Hindu Culture in Sri Lanka, Volume 2: Dances & Paintings (editor) (Tamil) (2002, Department of Hindu Religious & Cultural Affairs, Sri Lanka)
- The Vanni Principalities in Sri Lanka (Tamil) (2003, Kumaran Press)
- Tamil Literature and Historical Traditions in Sri Lanka (Tamil) (2004, Kumaran Press)
- Hinduism in Sri Lanka (Tamil) (2004, Kumaran Press)
- Tamil Inscriptions in Sri Lanka (Tamil) (2006, Department of Hindu Religious & Cultural Affairs, Sri Lanka)
- Glimpses of an Ancient Civilisation: Society and Culture in Jaffna (300 BC to AD 500) (2026)
