= M. Sivasuriya =

3rd Chancellor of the University of Jaffna
- Preceded by: T. Nadaraja
- Succeeded by: S. Pathmanathan

Personal details
- Education: University of Ceylon
- Profession: Academic

Professor M. Sivasuriya is a Sri Lankan Tamil physician, academic and former chancellor of the University of Jaffna.

== Early life ==
Sivasuriya was educated at the University of Ceylon from where he received a MBBS degree.

== Career ==
Sivasuriya was one of the founding members of staff of the Faculty of Medicine of the University of Ceylon, Peradeniya in 1962. Sivasuriya then became the first Professor of Obstetrics and Gynaecology at the University of Jaffna. He served as Head of the Department of Obstetrics and Gynaecology at the university. He was later appointed chancellor of the university.

Sivasuriya is a fellow of the Royal College of Surgeons of England, Royal College of Surgeons of Edinburgh, Royal College of Physicians and Surgeons of Glasgow, American College of Surgeons, Royal College of Obstetricians and Gynaecologists, Sri Lanka College of Obstetricians and Gynaecologists and College of Surgeons of Sri Lanka. He has received an honorary doctorate from the University of Jaffna.
