= K. Kunaratnam =

Sri Lankan Tamil academic

K. Kunaratnam FRAS CPhys FInstP
- Born: 30 April 1934; Erlalai, Sri Lanka
- Died: 9 September 2015 (aged 81); Colombo, Sri Lanka
- Education: Union College, Tellippalai
- Alma mater: University of Ceylon, Colombo; Imperial College London
- Occupation: Academic
- Title: Vice-Chancellor of the University of Jaffna
- Term: April 1994 – February 1997
- Predecessor: A. Thurairajah
- Successor: P. Balasundarampillai

Kanthia Kunaratnam (30 April 1934 – 9 September 2015) was a Sri Lankan Tamil physicist, academic and former vice-chancellor of the University of Jaffna.

== Early life ==
Kunaratnam joined the University of Ceylon, Colombo in 1954 and graduated in 1958 with a first class honours B.Sc. degree in physics.

== Career ==
After university Kunaratnam worked at the University of Ceylon, Colombo and University of Ceylon, Peradeniya. He studied at Imperial College London between October 1960 and July 1963, obtaining a DIC and a PhD degree.

Kunaratnam was visiting fellow and lecturer in geophysics at the Department of Geology, University of Durham between January 1971 and September 1971. He was visiting fellow at the Department of Physics, Queen Elizabeth College from October 1971 to December 1971.

Kunaratnam was appointed Founder Head of the Department of Physics at the University of Sri Lanka Jaffna campus in April 1975. He remained head of the department until October 1980. He was visiting lecturer at the School of Physics, University of Science, Malaysia between Jan 1981 and October 1981. He then returned to the University of Jaffna and resumed being Head of the Department of Physics, serving until February 1985. He was visiting fellow and professor at the Department of Geophysics, University of Edinburgh between October 1988 and August 1989. He was visiting fellow at the Department of Earth Sciences, Bullard Laboratories, University of Cambridge between Sept 1989 and October 1989.

Kunaratnam was Head of the Department of Computer Science at the university between January 1991 and November 1993. He then served as Head of the Department of Physics from March 1994 and April 1994.

Kunaratnam served as dean of the Faculty of Science twice, from January 1977 to May 1978 and January 1985 to March 1988. He served as vice-chancellor of the university between April 1994 and February 1997. Kunaratnam retired in April 2000. He served as an emeritus professor at the Department of Physics till his death.

Kunaratnam was elected fellow of the Royal Astronomical Society in 1998 and fellow and chartered Physicist of the Institute of Physics in 1999. He was awarded an honorary doctorate from the University of Jaffna in 2001. He published several papers in scientific journals on magnetic anomalies in earth magnetic field.

Kunaratnam died on 9 September 2015 in Colombo.
