= Subramaniam Mohanadas =

S. Mohanadas CChem F.I.Chem. C
- எஸ். மோகனதாஸ்
- Education: University of Sri Lanka; University of Adelaide
- Occupation: Academic
- Title: Vice-Chancellor of the University of Jaffna
- Term: April 2003 – March 2006
- Predecessor: P. Balasundarampillai

Subramaniam Mohanadas (Tamil: சுப்பிரமணியம் மோகனதாஸ்) is a Sri Lankan Tamil chemist, academic and former vice-chancellor of the University of Jaffna.

== Early life ==
Mohanadas obtained a BSc degree from the University of Sri Lanka. He later received a Phd degree from the University of Adelaide in 1978 after producing a thesis titled Effects of atrizine on the assimilation of inorganic nitrogen compounds in plants and microorganisms.

== Career ==
Mohanadas joined the University of Jaffna in 1986. He served as dean of the Faculty of Agriculture between October 1992 to March 1994. He served as vice-chancellor of the university between April 2003 and March 2006. His appointment was controversial as he was only an associate professor. After Mohanadas' successor Ratnajeevan Hoole failed to take up his post Mohanadas was appointed acting vice-chancellor.

Mohanadas is a member of the University Grants Commission. He is president of the Institute of Chemistry Ceylon for 2012/13.
