= Nagalingam =

Nagalingam நாகலிங்கம்
- Pronunciation: Nākaliṅkam
- Gender: Male
- Language: Tamil

Origin
- Region of origin: Southern India; North-eastern Sri Lanka

Other names
- Alternative spelling: Nagalingham, Nagalingum

Nagalingam (Tamil: நாகலிங்கம்) is a Tamil male given name. Due to the Tamil tradition of using patronymic surnames it may also be a surname for males and females.

== Notable people ==
- C. Nagalingam (1893–1958), Ceylonese judge and lawyer
- Deven Nagalingum, Mauritian politician
- P. Nagalingam, Indian politician
- Ponnambalam Nagalingam, Ceylonese politician
- Nagalingam Ethirveerasingam, Ceylonese athlete
- Nagalingam Shanmugalingam, Sri Lankan sociologist and academic
- Nagalingam Shanmugathasan (1920–1993), Sri Lankan trade unionist and politician
