= Shanmugalingam =

Shanmugalingam (Tamil: சண்முகலிங்கம்) is a surname and given name, commonly used in Sri Lanka. Notable people with the name include:

Surname:

- Kulanthai Shanmugalingam (1931–2025), Sri Lankan Tamil theatre artist and playwright
- N. Shanmugalingam, Sri Lankan Tamil sociologist
- Jo Shanmugalingam, British civil servant

Given name:

- Pottu Amman (Tamil militant) (Shanmugalingam Sivashankar), a Sri Lankan Tamil rebel
