= Faculty of Engineering, University of Peradeniya =

Academic faculty in Sri Lanka

Coordinates: 7°15′15″N 80°35′48″E

- Type: Public
- Established: 1950
- Dean: Prof.Lilantha Samaranayake
- Administrative staff: 349
- Students: 1500
- Location: Peradeniya, Sri Lanka
- Campus: Suburban
- Colors: Pink
- Website: https://eng.pdn.ac.lk

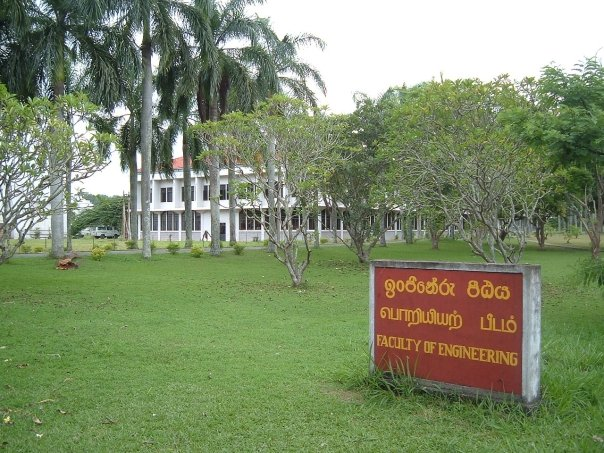
Entrance to the Faculty of Engineering, University of Peradeniya

The Faculty of Engineering, University of Peradeniya is one of the eight academic faculties at the university. It is the oldest engineering faculty in Sri Lanka. It offers full-time Undergraduate Courses leading to the degree of Bachelor of Science of engineering (B.Sc.Eng.), and several postgraduate degrees.

== Location ==
Faculty of Engineering is located in the main campus of the university in Peradeniya. It is on one side of the Mahaweli River, at a side of the main road leading to Gampola. The famous Akbar bridge links the two banks of the river.

== History ==
=== Beginnings ===
Modern engineering education in Sri Lanka originated at the Ceylon Technical College, where from 1933 students prepared for the external B.Sc. in Engineering(Hon's) degree from the University of London. In October 1945, the university council of the University of Ceylon - Sri Lanka's first modern university - resolved to establish its engineering faculty. The plan to set up the faculty was initiated by appointing E.O.E. Pereira, a senior engineer in the Public Works Department as a professor in Civil Engineering. Since then, he led the development project. But his plans did not materialize until December 1949, when a crisis occurred at the Ceylon Technical College where the entire batch of Civil Engineering failed to pass the qualifying examination. After that, the Ministry of Education took a decision to close down the technical college and move the engineering education permanently to the Engineering Faculty that is to be set up at the University of Ceylon.

On 1 July 1950, the University of Ceylon established its Faculty of Engineering, with staff and students from the Ceylon Technical College forming its nucleus. At the initial stages it was based in the Colombo campus and used facilities of the Technical College, later it was moved to Peradeniya Campus. This process was completed in 1964. Three fields of study that had been conducted till then at the Ceylon Technical College formed the first three founding Departments of study, namely Civil Engineering, Electrical Engineering and Mechanical Engineering. The initial intake of students was 25. 19 students were taken from outside and the remaining 6 were transferred from the Faculty of Science of University of Ceylon. Total initial academic staff was 12. It included Prof. E.O.E. Pereira - Head of the Civil Engineering Department, Prof. R.H. Paul - Head of the Electrical Engineering Department, Mr. J.C.V Chinnappa - Head of the Mechanical Engineering Department, who later became a professor. Professor Perera was elected Dean of the faculty in the inaugural faculty meeting. The intake of students reached 150 by 1964. Until then, the total number of graduate output was 384, all of them except one being male.

=== Shift to Peradeniya ===
While the faculty was functioning in Colombo, plans were underway to develop a 6 hectare plot of land on the left bank of Mahaweli River at Peradeniya, to set up the permanent housing for it. Professor Perera prepared his plans for an intake of 125 students. This required Rs. 9 million (uninflated) for buildings and Rs. 5 million (uninflated) for equipment. But the Vice Chancellor Sir Nicholas Attygalle refused to allocate that amount due to budget restrictions and allocated only Rs. 5.6 million for the entire project. This caused a dispute between the Professor and the administration which resulted in the resignation of Professor Perera from all his duties. His resignation stalled the project. University council called for an immediate report on the matter. The technical committee that took up the investigation stood strongly by Professor Perera's decision. This resulted in Ministry of Education allocating further funds for the project. The professor was restored in his post. The development project was finished by 1964 and in October 1964, the first batch of students were transferred from Colombo to Peradeniya.

=== 1964 to 1971 ===
From 1964 to 1971, the faculty functioned under the old regulations. Due to the language regulations of 1956, students entering the faculty had to switch from their respective mother language to English - the medium of instruction of the faculty - to follow lectures. This caused some difficulties for students, which were addressed partially in 1970 by making bilingual streams for first year students. The first new department, Department of Mathematics was created in 1965 by Prof. E.F. Bartholomeusz. In 1971, the faculty received an IBM 1130, the first university computer in the country. The student unrests in 1965 and 1966 prompted the government to create a National Council for Higher Education (NCHE) to overlook the university system as the executive authority. In 1971, three other departments, Department of Production Engineering, Department of Chemical Engineering and Department of Agricultural Engineering were added to the faculty.

=== 1971 to 2000 ===
After the 1971 JVP Insurrection, the government decided to amalgamate all the universities to one single university. Therefore, from 1974 to 1978, the faculty was known as the Faculty of Engineering, University of Sri Lanka, Peradeniya Campus. It was only after the dissolution of the University of Sri Lanka in 1978, the faculty was known by its present name, Faculty of Engineering, University of Peradeniya. The body which overlooked the university system, NCHE was also renamed University Grants Commission in the same year. Intake of students which remained 150 by 1971 reached 250 by 1978 and 325 by 2000. Until a second Faculty of Engineering was opened at Katubedda in 1972, it was the only institution to grant engineering degrees in Sri Lanka. The Department of Agricultural Engineering was split for the Faculty of Engineering and moved to the Faculty of Agriculture in the late 1970s. The Department of Computer Science was added to the faculty in 1985. The Peradeniya Engineering Faculty Alumni Association (PEFAA) was created in 1991. During this period, the faculty commemorated the Golden Jubilee of University of Peradeniya (in 1992) and the Golden Jubilee of the faculty (in 2000) with two mega scale exhibitions. The 1987–89 JVP Insurrection caused faculty to be closed frequently during 1988 and 1989. It was by May 1990, the faculty could resume its normal academic work.

=== 2001 onwards ===
The faculty shifted to the semester based course unit system by 2001. Name of the Department of Computer Science was changed to Department of Computer Engineering and it started offering a degree program in the same year. In 2005, the Department of Chemical Engineering was also renamed the Department of Chemical and Process Engineering. Student intake was further increased to 415 by 2008. The Production Engineering Department was renamed as the “Department of Manufacturing and Industrial Engineering” in January 2017.

== Organization ==
Dean is the head of both academic and non academic administration. Head of the departments/ units/centers, Assistant Registrar, Assistant Bursar and the secretary assist in the administration and financial work of the faculty. The number of professorial chairs in the Faculty is eleven, three each in Civil Engineering, and Electrical & Electronic Engineering, two in Mechanical Engineering and one each in Engineering Mathematics, Production Engineering and Chemical & Process Engineering.

The Heads of the Departments handle the academic affaires, primary human resources and financial activities within of the department.

Assistant Registrar is responsible for issuing the documents for the students, prospective students, employers and the outsiders through the Dean, publishing and announcing decisions and events of the faculty board( Examination Dates etc.), maintain the records of the faculty statistics, provide all aspects of human resources and reception of Faculty's visitors. Assistant Bursar approves the payrolls and other payments, scholarships and fixes the annual budget.

== Departments of study ==
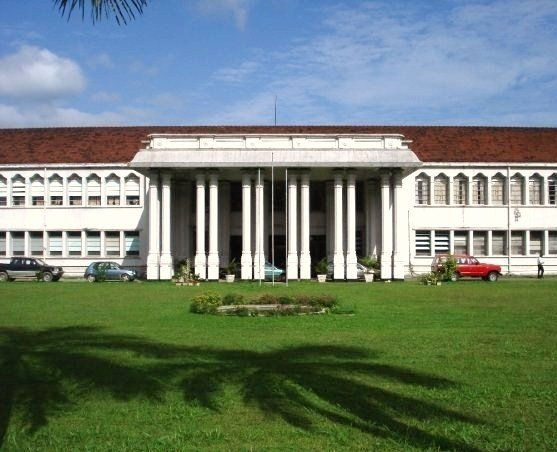
Administrative Building

The number of departments of study in the faculty are eight. Out of them, undergraduate students can pursue study in seven. The departments of study are:

- Department of Chemical and Process Engineering
- Department of Civil Engineering
- Department of Computer Engineering
- Department of Electrical & Electronic Engineering
- Department of Engineering Mathematics
- Department of Mechanical Engineering
- Department of Manufacturing and Industrial Engineering

== Admission ==
Almost all the students of the faculty are from Sri Lanka. Admission to the faculty of Engineering is subjected to the Sri Lankan government policy of university admission.

Selection of students is done on the basis of merit order on the average Z score obtained by candidates at the GCE Advanced Level examination. District merit criteria is the procedure used to select undergraduates to the faculty. Competition to enter the university is severe.

== Undergraduate studies in engineering ==
The Faculty offers a full-time Undergraduate Course leading to the degree of Bachelor of Science in Engineering [B.Sc.Eng.(Hon's).The duration of the degree is 4 years. First year is common to all students. The rest is devoted to specialisation in one of the branches of engineering. Now it has 6 fields of study. Faculty adopted the course unit system in 2001. There are special sessions to introduce the students to practical engineering problems there are programmes for industrial training. These have been drawn up in collaboration with the National Apprenticeship and Industrial Training Authority (NAITA).

== Postgraduate study ==
There are four postgraduate courses offered by the university. The degree of Master of the Science of Engineering (MSc.Eng.) is awarded after one year of full-time graduate study. Postgraduate Courses in special subjects are conducted from time to time and these lead to a Diploma in Engineering. The higher degrees of Master of Philosophy (M.Phil.) and Doctor of Philosophy (PhD) are awarded on the basis of dissertations.

- Regular full-time graduate students
- Regular part-time graduate students
- Provisional students
- Casual students

All the departments conduct Postgraduate Diploma / MSc.Eng. Courses.

== Engineering graduates ==
The number of graduates produced by Faculty of Engineering, University of Peradeniya up to 31 December 2007.

Department	Number of Graduates
Civil Engineering	5025
Electrical and Electronic Engineering	1521
Mechanical Engineering	1173
Production Engineering	763
Chemical and Process Engineering	274
Computer Engineering	200
TOTAL	8956

== Past deans of the faculty ==
- Prof. E.O.E. Pereira (1950-65 & 1966–69)
- Prof. R.H. Paul (1965–66)
- Prof. J.C.V. Chinnappa (1969–71)
- Prof. H.B. de Silva (1972–75)
- Prof. A. Thurairajah (1975-77 & 1982–85)
- Prof. W.P. Jayasekara (1977–82)
- Prof. C.L.V. Jayathilake (1985-86 & 1988–89)
- Prof. M. Amaratunga (1986–88)
- Prof. M. P. Ranaweera (1989–94)
- Prof. S. Ranatunga (1994–99)
- Prof. W.J.N. Fernando (1999–2002)
- Prof. S.D. Pathirana (2002–2005)
- Prof. S. B. S. Abayakoon(2005–2009)
- Prof. W.M.S.B.Weerakoon (2009–2012)
- Prof. Leelananda Rajapaksha (2012–2018)
- Prof. Gamunu Herath (2018–Present)

== Facilities ==
There are a number of academic facilities in the faculty.

=== Academic facilities ===
- The Engineering Library
- Applied Thermodynamics Laboratory
- Applied Machine Laboratory
- Civil & Environmental Laboratory
- Surveying Laboratory
- Structural Engineering Laboratory
- Drawing Offices
- Engineering Workshops
- CNC Machining and Automation Facility
- Industrial Training and Career Guidance Unit
- The Computing Centre
- The Electronics Workshop
- English Language Teaching Unit (ELTU)
  - The Language Laboratory
- Engineering Education Unit
  - Audio Visual Facility
- Research and Development Units
  - Engineering Design Centre (EDC)
  - Centre for Engineering Research and Postgraduate Studies (CERPS)

=== University service facilities ===
- Motor Vehicle Repair Unit (MVRU)

== Societies and unions ==
ESU (Engineering Students' Union) is the official students' union in the Faculty of Engineering, University of Peradeniya. It is also responsible for providing a variety of services to students. Students can get involved in its management through numerous and varied committees, general meetings, or become one of its elected officers. The ESU represents students both within the university and outside, including on local and national issues as well as issues in the faculty and in the university. They are also involved in welfare affairs of the student body. ESU has understood the social responsibility they have as a group of undergraduates. Arunella plays a major role in the social and charity works done for the community all around the country who paid for their free education.

Other societies inside the faculty are:

- Electrical and Electronic Engineers Society (EEES)
- Association of Computer Engineering Students (ACES)
- Civil Engineers Society (CES)
- Chemical Engineering Students Society (ChESS)
- Mechanical Engineers Society (MES)
- Production Engineering Students Society (PESS)
- Engineering Students' Publication Society (ESPS)
- Engineering Faculty Art Circle
- Engineering Faculty Buddhist Brotherhood
- Power and High voltage Engineers Society (PHES)
- Buddhist Brotherhood Society Faculty of Engineering

== Engineering exhibition EngEx2010 ==
Commemorating the 60th anniversary of its inauguration, the faculty of Engineering held a mega exhibition during September 2010 under the theme, Engineering: The Future. It was the largest event held in the faculty since year 2000.

== See also ==
- University of Peradeniya
- Department of Computer Engineering, University of Peradeniya
