= Raju (Tamil militant) =

Sri Lankan Tamil militant (1961–2002)

Colonel Raju
- கேணல் ராயூ
- Born: A. Neminathan; 30 May 1961
- Died: 25 August 2002 (aged 41); Malaysia
- Other names: Kannan, Kuyilan
- Years active: 1983–2002
- Organization: Liberation Tigers of Tamil Eelam

Ambalavanar Neminathan (Tamil: அம்பலவாணர் நேமிநாதன் Ampalavāṇar Nēminātaṉ; 30 May 1961 – 25 August 2002; commonly known by the nom de guerre Raju) was a leading member of the Liberation Tigers of Tamil Eelam (LTTE), a separatist Tamil militant organisation in Sri Lanka.

Neminathan was born on May 30, 1961. He was from Erlalai South, near Chunnakam, Jaffna District.

Neminathan joined the LTTE after the Black July riots of 1983, taking on the nom de guerre Raju. Raju served as the head of the LTTE's Engineering Corps. He was said to be close to LTTE leader V. Prabhakaran. He was special commander of the Leopard Commandos, an infantry unit, and chief technical officer in the Kittu Regiment, the LTTE's artillery unit which Raju helped create. He innovated the use of remote controlled devices used in toys to trigger explosions. Raju was the target of a number of covert assassination attempts by the Sri Lankan military.

After developing cancer, Raju was taken from Vanni to Malaysia by boat. He died on August 25, 2002, in Malaysia. He was posthumously promoted to Colonel.
