= Parameshwara College, Jaffna =

Parameshwara College
- பரமேஸ்வரா கல்லூரி

Location
- Thirunelvely; Jaffna, Jaffna District, Northern Province; Ceylon
- Coordinates: 9°41′01.50″N 80°01′24.20″E

Information
- Founded: 1921
- Founder: P. Ramanathan
- Closed: 1974

Parameshwara College (Tamil: பரமேஸ்வரா கல்லூரி Paramēsvarā Kallūri) was one of the leading Hindu schools in Ceylon (now Sri Lanka). It was founded by Sir P. Ramanathan in 1921. His idea was to make the school a university. It began as a teacher training school and later conducted classes for the London Matriculation and Cambridge exams. Later, it followed the S.S.C. Exam and University Entrance syllabus. This school was built on 36 acres (150,000 m^{2}) of land with room for expansion; later a Sivan temple was built on the school compound for prayers. The school premises were taken over by the government in 1974 to make way for the newly created Jaffna Campus of the University of Sri Lanka (later University of Jaffna). The students and teachers who were attending the school were sent to nearby schools. The old building is still there as the entrance to the University of Jaffna.

== See also ==
- Category:Alumni of Parameshwara College, Jaffna
