= Karaveddy =

Karaveddy கரவெட்டி කරවෙඩ්ඩිය
- Town
- Location within Northern Province
- Coordinates: 9°48′0″N 80°12′0″E
- Country: Sri Lanka
- Province: Northern
- District: Jaffna
- DS Division: Vadamarachchi South‐West

Karaveddy is a town located 7 km from the City of Point Pedro, Jaffna District, Sri Lanka. In local Tamil Language it translates to Coastal Strip, although it is few km from the coast. Karaveddy Pradeshya Sabha is the administrative office for this region. Main town area of Karaveddy is called as Nelliady.

Karaveddy is the birthplace of many popular personalities like V.K.Sittampalam, the first Sri Lankan Postmaster general, P. Kandiah, the first and only Communist Member of Parliament elected to represent Point Pedro electorate, M. Sivasithamparam, M.P for Uduppiddy & Nallur and the Deputy Speaker of Sri Lankan Parliament, S. Sivagnanasundaram, the Editor of "Chiriththiran" magazine, Prof. K. Sivathamby, Ceylon's (Sri Lanka) famous grapes vineyard owner, V.S.Thamotharampillai and many others. Anton Balasingham, the Political Adviser of the LTTE, lived during his childhood and early youth in Karaveddy.

"Karavai Velan Kovai" is an ancient literary work dedicated to a feudal landlord lived in Karaveddy. "Karavai" is a shortened name of this village.

Karaveddy is well known for its culture and religious places.

== Famous Schools ==
- Nelliady Central College
- [Gnanasariyar college]
- Vadamaradchy Central Ladies College
- Vigneswara College
- Udupiddy American Mission College
- Udupiddy Girls' College
