= K. Sivathamby =

Professor K. Sivathamby
- கா. சிவத்தம்பி
- Born: 10 May 1932; Karaveddy, Ceylon
- Died: 6 July 2011 (aged 79); Colombo, Sri Lanka
- Education: University of Ceylon; University of Birmingham
- Occupation: Academic

Professor Karthigesu Sivathamby (Tamil: கார்த்திகேசு சிவத்தம்பி; 10 May 1932 – 6 July 2011) was a Sri Lankan Tamil literary historian, author and academic.

== Early life and family ==
Sivathamby was born on 10 May 1932 in Karaveddy in northern Ceylon. He was the son of T. P. Karthigesu, a Tamil pundit, and Valliammai. He was educated at Vigneswara Vidyalayam and Zahira College, Colombo (1949–52). After school Sivathamby joined the University of Ceylon, Peradeniya in 1953, studying under K. Kanapathypillai and graduating with B.A. degree in history, economics and Tamil. Sivathamby became a Marxist during his university days. He later received a M.A. degree in Tamil, under the guidance of S. Vithiananthan, from the university. Sivathamby received a Ph.D. degree from the University of Birmingham in 1970 after producing thesis, supervised by George Derwent Thomson, on drama in ancient Tamil society.

Sivathamby was married to Rupavathy. They had three daughters (Mangai, Kothai and Varthani).

== Career ==
Sivathamby worked as a simultaneous interpreter at the House of Representatives of Ceylon before teaching at Zahira College. He then taught at Vidyodaya University (1965–78) before joining the University of Jaffna in 1978 and heading up its Tamil and Aesthetic Studies departments. He retired from the University of Jaffna in 1996 but then served as emeritus professor at the university until his death.

Sivathamby was a visiting professor of Tamil at the Uppsala University (1992), University of Madras (1998) and Institute of International Tamil Studies, Madras (1999). He was senior research/visiting fellow at Jawaharlal Nehru University, Delhi (1982), Tamil University (1982) and University of Cambridge (1983–84).

Sivathamby was chairman of the Coordinating Committee of Citizens of North and East of Sri Lanka and the Tamil Refugee Rehabilitation Organisation (1986–98). He was also patron of the Colombo Tamil Sangam. Sivathamby died on 6 July 2011 at his home in Dehiwala, Colombo following a heart attack.

== Works ==
Sivathamby wrote around 70 books and 200 research papers including:

- The Tamil Film as a Medium of Political Communication (1981, New Century Book House)
- Drama in Ancient Tamil Society (1981, New Century Book House)
- Literary History in Tamil: A Historiographical Analysis (1986, Tamil University)
- Sri Lankan Tamil Society and Politics (1995, New Century Book House)
- Studies in Ancient Tamil Society: Economy, Society and the State Formation (1998, New Century Book House)
- Being Tamil and Sri Lankan (2005, Aivakam)
- Confronting the Prospects for Peace in Sri Lanka
- Sri Lankan Tamils: Introduction to Their History Culture and Politics
- Tamil Nationalism and Social Conflicts
- The Origin and Development of Tamil Short Story, Novel and Life
- Understanding the Dravidian Movement
