= Department of Computer Engineering, University of Peradeniya =

Department of Computer Engineering
- Established: 2001
- Department Head: Dr. Asitha Bandaranayake
- Faculty: 20 (12 permanent academic staff members and 8 temporary academic staff members)
- Administrative staff: 13
- Students: 400
- Location: Peradeniya, Sri Lanka
- Campus: University of Peradeniya
- Website: http://www.ce.pdn.ac.lk

Department of Computer Engineering is the youngest department of the Faculty of Engineering, University of Peradeniya established in 2001 with 20 undergraduate students. At present, there are approximately 100 students in each batch.

== History ==
The Department of Computer Engineering was established in the Faculty of Engineering in Peradeniya in 1985. Although it is the youngest department in the Faculty, it is the oldest Computer Engineering Department to be established in the University system of the country. The main function of the department initially was to conduct programming courses to the students in all disciplines of the Faculty. Over the years the department has developed into a fully-fledged department and it now offers several courses in Computer Engineering to the students.

The demand from the students for Computer Engineering has been high and a limited number is admitted to follow it. The graduates who have specialized in Computer Engineering are highly sought after by local as well as foreign employers. In view of the good employment prospects for Computer Engineering graduates and the large demand from the students, the department has initiated a degree programme leading to the B.Sc. Eng. degree in Computer Engineering from year 2001.

== ACES: Association of Computer Engineering Students ==
ACES is the official club representing the student body of the department. It was formed in 2001. The organization is headed by the ACES council (consisting of undergraduates as the president, secretary, and committee and a senior treasurer from the academic staff).

ACES organizes the following events annually.

- ACES Coders
- ACES hackathon
- Spark
- ESCaPE - Project Symposium
- Career fair

== Laboratories and resources ==
- Embedded Systems and Computer Architecture Lab
- Hardware and Computer Interfacing Lab
- Computer Networking Lab
