= S. Mageswaran =

Sri Lankan chemist (d. 1998)

Sivapathasundaram Mageswaran was a Sri Lankan chemist. Primarily associated with the University of Jaffna, he became the inaugural head of the chemistry department in 1975, and later Dean of the university's Faculty of Science.

He published several papers in scientific journals.

Mageswaran died on 2 February 1998. Since then, memorial lectures have been held annually at the University of Jaffna in his memory.
