= Kandiah Neelakandan =

Sri Lankan lawyer (1947–2018)

- கந்தையா நீலகண்டன்
- Born: 16 April 1947
- Died: 18 February 2018 (aged 70); Colombo, Sri Lanka
- Education: Udupiddy American Mission College, Jaffna Hindu College
- Alma mater: Sri Lanka Law College
- Occupation: Lawyer
- Spouse: Sasithevi

Kandiah Neelakandan (Tamil: கந்தையா நீலகண்டன்; 16 April 1947 – 18 February 2018) was a Sri Lankan Tamil lawyer and the lead partner in Neelakandan & Neelakandan (previously Murugesu and Neelakandan). He died on 18 February 2018 when he was 70 years old.

== Early life and family ==
Neelakandan was educated at Udupiddy American Mission College and Jaffna Hindu College. After school he joined Sri Lanka Law College, graduating in 1969.

Neelakandan was married to Sasithevi, daughter of V. Murugesu, his partner.

== Career ==
Neelakandan was called to the bar as an attorney-at-law of the Supreme Court in 1970. He joined Murugesu and Kularatne in January 1970 as a Professional Assistant. He became a partner of the firm, which was renamed Murugesu and Neelakandan, in 1973. He was chief editor of the Bar Association Law Journal for many years. He was Group Deputy Chairman of George Steuart and Co, Sri Lanka's oldest company, from 2008 to 2012. He had previously been secretary of the company.

Neelakandan was a member of the Company Law Advisory Commission, the Law Commission of Sri Lanka and the Council of Legal Education. He has written several books on Sri Lankan company law. He was general-secretary of the All Ceylon Hindu Congress before becoming its president. He was president of the Sri Lanka-India Society.

== Death ==
Kandiah Neelakandan died on 18 February 2018 afternoon at the age of 70 in Colombo due to illness.
