= P. Balasundarampillai =

Sri Lankan Tamil academic

Professor Ponnuthurai Balasundarampillai
- பொ. பாலசுந்தரம்பிள்ளை
- Education: Jaffna Hindu College
- Occupation: Academic
- Title: Vice-Chancellor of the University of Jaffna
- Term: February 1997 – April 2003
- Predecessor: K. Kunaratnam
- Successor: S. Mohanadas

Professor Ponnuthurai Balasundarampillai (Tamil: பொன்னுத்துரை பாலசுந்தரம்பிள்ளை) is a Sri Lankan Tamil academic and former vice-chancellor of the University of Jaffna.

== Early life and family ==
Balasundarampillaih was educated at the Jaffna Hindu College.

== Career ==
Balasundarampillai was a professor of geography at the University of Jaffna in the 1980s. He was the Dean of the Faculty of Arts at the university from March 1991 to March 1997. He then served as vice-chancellor of the university between February 1997 and April 2003.
