= Sucharitha Gamlath =

Sri Lankan academic

Professor Sucharitha Gamlath
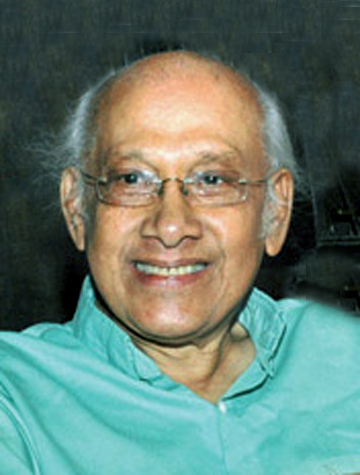
- Born: 10 March 1934; Nakkawita, Sri Lanka
- Died: 30 March 2013 (aged 79)
- Education: PhD University of London in 1969.
- Occupation: University lecturer
- Political party: Lanka Sama Samaja Party, International Committee of the Fourth International, Revolutionary Communist League

Sucharitha Gamlath (10 March 1934 – 30 March 2013) was a veteran professor of Sinhala, and a bright student of the Peradeniya University. After that he functioned as the dean of the Sinhala Language Faculty of the Jaffna University. He has also served in the University of Ruhuna and Rajarata University of Sri Lanka, Sri Lanka. And he was a well-known scholastic in linguistics and critiques who has authored a number of books on language, literature, arts and politics.

== Education ==
He graduated with first-class honours for classical Indian languages and Sinhala language at the University of Ceylon, Peradeniya and carried away the awards, The Rowland's Gold Medal, The Jayanayake Prize and The Oriental Research Scholarship. In the same year, he was appointed assistant lecturer in Sinhala of the same university. In 1966 he entered the University of London and studied Western philosophy and Indian philosophy, philosophical psychology and aesthetics.

At the University of London, he opted philosophy as his area of research for his PhD. Although he has not done philosophy as a subject for his first degree, University of London has unanimously agreed to offer him the chance. His political view was his religion and he can be claimed as an ardent follower of his philosophy. In 1969 he submitted a thesis titled A Philosophical Investigation into the Nature and Role of Emotion in Art comparing Indian and Western aesthetic theories and was awarded the PhD degree in philosophy by the University of London.

In 1970 he was appointed as a lecturer of the University of Colombo and in 1971 promoted as senior lecturer. In 1975 he was appointed as professor of Sinhala language and literature of the University of Sri Lanka and was posted to the Jaffna Campus. He was the dean of the Faculty of Humanities, head of the departments of Philosophy, English and Sinhala and the chief student counselor in University of Jaffna.

Being a Marxist since his student days, in the late 1970s he became a sympathiser of the Trotskyist Group, Revolutionary Communist League – RCL (now Socialist Equality Party), which was led by the late Keerthi Balasooriya. Soon, he became one of the leading theoreticians of RCL and along with Keerthi Balasooriya, initiated a strong movement to widely popularise Marxist aesthetics theory.

Despite being one of the most accomplished academics on Sinhala language as well as on English, Pali and Sanskrit, he was sacked from his university in 1980 by the J. R. Jayewardene regime due to his strong political stand and his participation in the general strike in 1980. He remained unemployed for almost 15 years without compromising his convictions, and turning down offers extended by foreign universities. Later in 1994, he was reinstated under the government of Chandrika Kumaratunga, but soon left his position voluntarily, frustrated by the level of academic and political degeneration in the university system.

== Works ==
He was a pioneer in introducing the writings of Georgi Plekhanov, Leon Trotsky, André Breton, Walter Benjamin and Terry Eagleton on Marxist literary criticism to Sinhala readership. He became the most popular opponent of the then dominant bourgeois idealist literary tradition of the Peradeniya School led by the late Professor Ediriweera Sarachchandra. But Piyaseeli Wijegunasinghe was written Principles of Marxist Criticism: A Reply to Sucharitha Gamlath. her series of cannons aimed at Professor Sucharitha Gamlath, who, after quitting the RCL, went onto attack her previous works baselessly.

Gamlath co-authored a book critical of Sarachchandra's aesthetic vision with Kirthi Balasuriya. That book attempts to struggle with the remnants of idealism in the literary criticism.

Gamlath was one of the greatest aestheticians Sri Lanka has ever produced. His knowledge of both oriental and accidental aesthetics wasunquestionable. His massive contribution to literary criticism is yet unsurpassed, and can basically be divided into three periods. In the first period we find a scholar well-armed with the fundamentals of Sanskrit aesthetics into the literary criticism, then messed up with efforts by others to found an indigenous critical theory. His arguments to this effect could be found in his 'Kavsilumini Vinisa'.

He introduced theories of Sanskrit aesthetics having understood that it was to India that we ought to turn because it was the intellectual universe of our past. In his 'Rasavada Vivaranaya', 'Samskrutha Natya Kalava Saha Abinnana Sakunthalaya,' 'Natya Sastraye Rasavadaya', etc. we find that attempt. His 'Rasavada Vivaranaya' serves as a guide-book for the students who wish to have a grasp of 'rasavadaya' in Sinhala.

In the second period of his literary service we find a transitional intellectual whose aesthetic philosophy had been inclined to western theories of aesthetics. His 'Sahithya Lokaya ha Seba Lokaya' is a manifestation to this tendency where he raises questions and suspicions relating to the concepts of beauty, truth, morality and aesthetic judgement.

In the third period we find an aesthetics armed with dialectical materialism exploring the dialectical nature of aesthetics. In the 1980s Gamlath flashed himself in the sky of literary criticism in Sri Lanka as an adjudicator to whom all with no hypocrisy went and listened in the hope of expanding their intellectual horizons. It is during this third period that his aesthetic vision blossomed to a rationalistic brim. With regards to the written literature the critical tools he has developed and introduced are quite adequate to give the needed critical judgement. When it comes to the criticism of pure and applied music they have further to be developed and refined.

During the ceasefire, in October 2003, he became one of the leading intellectual supporters of the initiative in organising the biggest Sinhala-Tamil cultural festival in the recent history. He, along with Professor Karthigesu Sivathamby was renewed through the event, and both started working on a massive Sinhala – Tamil – English dictionary. Due to the sudden demise of Prof. Sivathamby in July 2011, Prof Gamalth took the burden of completing it, though he wasn't able to get it published before his death. He was the most outspoken academic who demythologised 'Mahavamsa' and continued to challenge the Sinhala readership to leave behind the 'Mahavamsa' mindset to form an alliance with the Tamil oppressed.

Another area of his services that cannot be left unmentioned is the translation of literature into Sinhala. He has translated world literature into Sinhala without distorting the original work and in poetically opulent language. I must say that for any student of translated literature, Gamlath's works will serve as guidelines in the field. A volume of essays is needed to assess the contribution of Gamlath to literature.

Apart from the contributions as a critic, Gamlath's services have extended to the areas of introducing technical terms to the Sinhala language. His English-Sinhalese Dictionary effectively caters to the needs of those in search of a fitting equivalent term in Sinhala. It is the largest-ever English-Sinhala dictionary in the history of lexicons in Sri Lanka, Ingirisi Sinhala Maha Shabdakoshaya. The dictionary claims to consist of more than 500,000 words. Of them, about 100,000 words are new entries – some of which the lexicographer coined or added, combing Sinhala classical literature or folklore.

== Early life ==
Gamlath was born in Nakkawita, a scenic village bordering the Sri Pada forest reserve and the Seetawaka river, in the Sabaragamuwa province. For generations, his father's family had been native doctors. He had two younger brothers, and his mother died when he was about nine years old. He learnt his letters from his paternal grandfather, Gamlathralalage Mohotti Appuhamy, who had a sound knowledge of oriental languages.

After attending the village school until grade 4, he realised that he could not gratify his thirst for knowledge by continuing his education at this little school. Thus, with the objective of furthering his education, he left with his uncle, who was a Buddhist monk at a temple in Awissawella and took up the saffron robe by the name Nakkawita Ananda. Life as a Buddhist monk gave him the rare opportunity to master the Pali, Sanskrit and Sinhala languages. Later in life, when questioned about the period of his life he spent as a Buddhist monk, he would often remark that he entered the Buddhist order to use every moment to further his knowledge.

Later, he joined the Vidyalankara Pirivena, a college for Buddhist monks to refine his knowledge further. The Vidyalankara Pirivena was an elite seat of learning in the country at that time, and the young monks who studied there gained a broad sense of political, social and cultural understanding. This environment motivated Gamlath to become a member of the Samasamaja Party. He completed his London Advanced Level examination with the intention of completing a Bachelor of Arts degree as an external student of the University of London. However, sensing that it was time to turn a new leaf, the young man gave up the robe and entered the University of Ceylon (now the University of Peradeniya) as a layman.
