= Srikanthalakshmi Arulanandam =

Sri Lankan librarian and writer (1961–2019)

Srikanthalakshmi Arulanandam

Srikanthalakshmi Arulanandam (Tamil: ஶ்ரீகாந்தலக்ஷ்மி அருளாநந்தம்; 1961 – December 25, 2019) was a Sri Lankan librarian and writer, who was an advocate for feminism, media literacy and Eelam-Tamil bibliography.

Born in Inuvil, the eldest of seven children, she studied at Sunnagam Ramanathan College and graduated with a degree in economics from Jaffna University. She then pursued a degree in information science and documentation from Kamarasar University, Madurai. Her career as a librarian began in 1989 as assistant librarian at Jaffna University and by 2012 was appointed principal librarian. She was elected president of the Sri Lanka Library Association in 2017 and was also president of the Sri Lanka Library Association. She also published several books with Vanathi Publishing House. She died of a heart attack on 25 December 2019 in Inuvil.
