= Sri Lanka Library Association =

Library association in Sri Lanka

The Sri Lanka Library Association (SLLA) is the main library association of Sri Lanka.

It was founded in 1960 as the Ceylon Library Association (CLA), based on organization carried out in the late 1950s by a group of senior librarians. In 1974, it was given official status by Act No. 20 of the Parliament of Sri Lanka, which also changed its name to the current one.

Its activities include promotion of the country's libraries and advocacy on their behalf, as well as conducting professional courses and granting certifications. It is a member of the Commonwealth Library Association and the International Federation of Library Associations.

== Former presidents ==
- Srikanthalakshmi Arulanandam
