= Udupiddy American Mission College =

Public provincial school in Udupiddy, Jaffna District, Sri Lanka

Udupiddy A.M.C.
- உடுப்பிட்டி அமெரிக்கன் மிஷன் கல்லூரி

Location
- Udupiddy, Northern Province; Sri Lanka
- 9°48′20.20″N 80°09′55.60″E

Information
- School type: Public provincial 1AB
- Motto: Light dispels Darkness (ஒளி இருளை அகற்றும்)
- Founded: 1852: 171 years ago
- Founder: British American Missionary
- School district: Vadamarachchi Education Zone, Jaffna District
- Authority: Northern Provincial Council
- Authorizer: Government
- School number: 1008003
- Principal: Mr. Puspakaran Deputy Principal= Mr. Uthayamoorthy
- Head teacher: Mrs. Sivaranjini Sachithananthamoorthy
- Staff: 70+
- Teaching staff: 65+
- Employees: 3
- Grades: 1-13
- Gender: Boys (girls in Advanced level)
- Age: 5 to 19
- Classes: Primary- 2prl/cls, Secondary- 3prl/cls, Tertiary- 4prl/cls
- Average class size: contain 35 students
- Language: Tamil, English
- Hours in school day: 6 hours
- Classrooms: 36
- Houses: Newton 🟨, Bicknel🟦, Sellaia🟩, Brown🟥
- Slogan: This is our school. Make me proud of it. It makes proud of me.
- Song: வாழிய வாழிய வாழியவே உடுப்பிட்டி அமெரிக்கன் மிஷன் கல்லூரி....
- Athletics: Annual Sports day
- Sports: Cricket, Foot ball, Volleyball etc
- Nickname: A.M.C
- USNWR ranking: high
- Publication: Torso (Article published by science stream students)
- School fees: free

Udupiddy American Mission College (Tamil: உடுப்பிட்டி அமெரிக்கன் மிஷன் கல்லூரி Uṭuppiṭṭi Amerikkaṉ Micaṉ Kallūri) is a national school in Udupiddy, Sri Lanka. It was founded on 4 January 1852 by American Ceylon Mission.

It was started in 1852. In 2021, it became a national school from a provincial school. It is 25th oldest school in Sri Lanka.

Chandraheskarampillai Packiyachandram alias Sivarasan, who was a key conspirator in the assassination of Rajiv Gandhi, studied here until he had to drop out after the death of his father who taught at Udupiddy American Mission College.

== Principals ==
1. Mr. O. S. Good - 1852
2. Mr. S. K. Rasiah - 1932 to 1938
3. Mr. K. T. John - 1939 to 1956
4. Mr. S. S. Selvadurai - 1956 to 1971
5. Mr. Robert Navaratnam - 1971 to
6. Mr. K. Sithamparappillai
7. Mr. V. T. Selvaratnam
8. Mr. N. Anantharaj
9. Mr. S. Thilaimpalan
10. Mr. K. Nadarajah
11. Mr. K. Tharmalingam
12. Mr. S.Krishnakumar - 2012 to 2020
13. Mr. Puvanenthirarajah - 2021 to 2022
14. Mr. Selvavinayakam- 2022
15. Mr. Pushpakaran- 2023- now

== Notable alumni ==
| Name | Notability | Reference |
|---|---|---|
| Prof. A. Thurairajah | 2nd Vice-Chancellor of the University of Jaffna | |
| Prof. S. Srisatkunarajah | Former Dean of Faculty of Science, First Dean of Faculty of Technology, University of Jaffna | |
| Kandiah Neelakandan | Lawyer, Former Chief editor of the Bar Association Law Journal, Former President - All Ceylon Hindu Congress | |
| P. Sriskandarajah | Puisne Justice of the Supreme Court of Ceylon | |
| T. Ramalingam | Member of the Ceylonese Parliament for Point Pedro | |
| Kamalakkannan Kamalavasakan | Island first rank G.C.E A/L 2012 for Physical science | |
| A. Arulpiragasam | First Commissioner of Elections (1955–57), Sri Lanka. | |

== See also ==
- List of schools in Northern Province, Sri Lanka
