= S. Srisatkunarajah =

Professor S. Srisatkunarajah
- சி. சிறிசற்குணராஜா
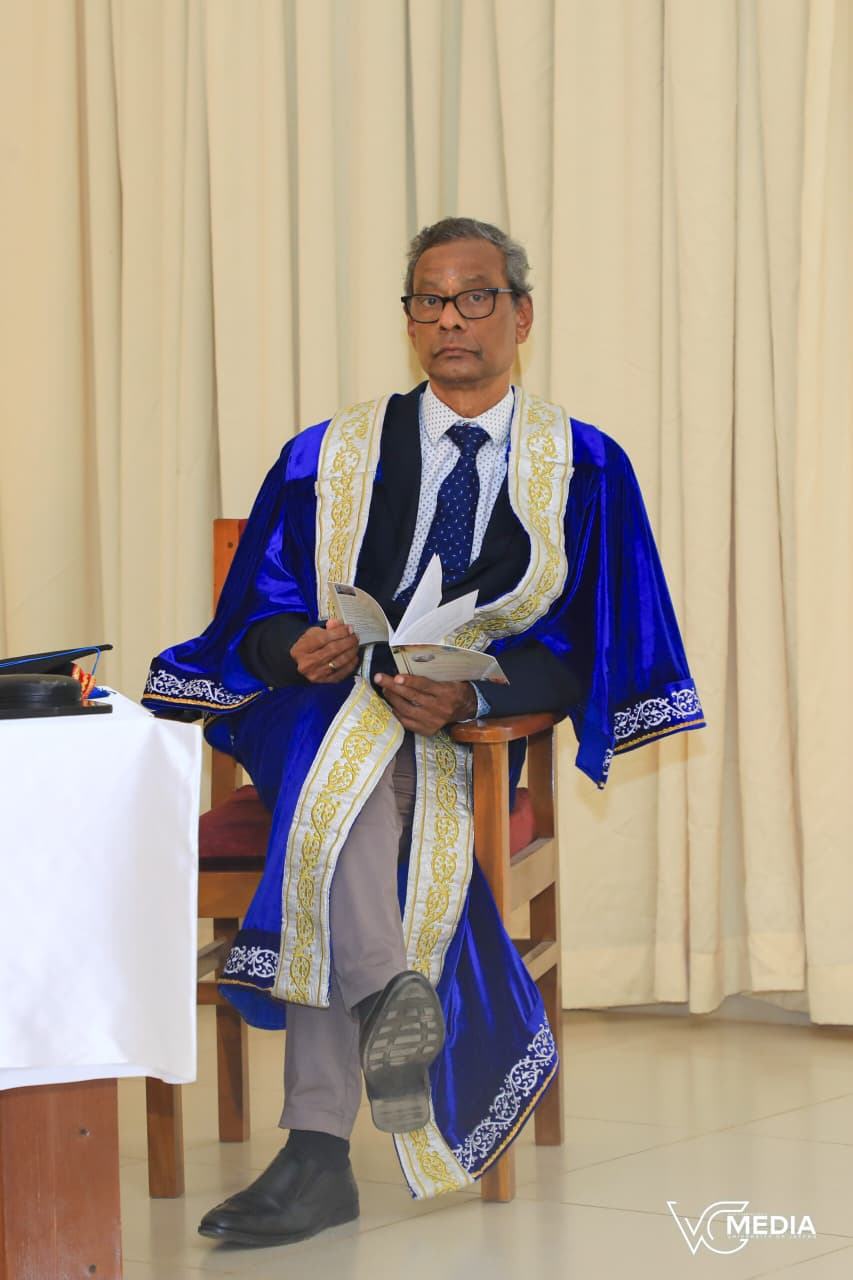
- Born: 25 March 1961 (age 65)
- Education: University of Jaffna; Heriot-Watt University
- Occupation: Academic
- Title: Vice-Chancellor of the University of Jaffna
- Term: 28 August 2020 – 24th March 2026
- Predecessor: R. Vigneswaran

Professor Sivakolundu Srisatkunarajah (Tamil: சிவக்கொழுந்து சிறிசற்குணராஜா) is a Sri Lankan Tamil mathematician, academic and Former vice-chancellor of the University of Jaffna.

== Early life ==
Srisatkunarajah was educated at Hartley College. After school he joined the University of Jaffna in 1979, graduating in 1983 with a B.Sc. honours degree in mathematics. He received a Ph.D. degree from Heriot-Watt University in 1988 after producing a thesis titled On the asymptotics of the heat equation for polygonal domains. He also has a postgraduate diploma in education from the Open University of Sri Lanka (2004).

Srisatkunarajah holds dual Australian and Sri Lankan citizenship.

== Career ==
Srisatkunarajah was head of the University of Jaffna's Department of Mathematics and Statistics from 2009 to 2012. He became a professor of mathematics in 2010. He served as dean of the Faculty of Science between July 2013 and July 2016 and dean of the Faculty of Technology from October 2016 to September 2017. In February 2017 the university's council nominated Srisatkunarajah along with T. Velnampy and R. Vigneswaran to be the university's new vice-chancellor. However, in April 2017 President Maithripala Sirisena chose Vigneswaran to be the new chancellor.

In August 2020 the University of Jaffna's council nominated Srisatkunarajah along with K. Mikunthan and T. Velnampy to be the university's new vice-chancellor. Srisatkunarajah was chosen by President Gotabaya Rajapaksa. He assumed duties on 28 August 2020.
