= Valveddi =

Coordinates: 9°49′N 80°11′E

Valvetty வல்வெட்டி
- Town
- Interactive map of Valvetty
- Country: Sri Lanka
- Province: Northern
- District: Jaffna
- DS Division: Vadamarachchi South‐West

Area
  - Total: 1.70 km^{2} (0.66 sq mi)
- Time zone: UTC+5:30 (Sri Lanka Standard Time Zone)

Valvetty (Tamil: வல்வெட்டி, romanized: Valveṭṭy), is a small town in Jaffna District in the northeast region of the Jaffna Peninsula in Northern Province, Sri Lanka. It is located south of the larger town of Valvettithurai, and northeast of the small town of Udupiddy.

== Etymology ==
The name Valvetty derives from the two Tamil words vallai meaning "forest" and veṭṭi meaning "expansive".

== See also ==
- List of towns in Northern Province, Sri Lanka
