= T. Nadaraja =

Sri Lankan academic, lawyer and author

Thambaiah Nadaraja
- தம்பையா நடராச
- Born: Thambiah Nadaraja; 27 December 1917
- Died: 20 January 2004 (aged 86)
- Education: Royal College, Colombo; Trinity College, Cambridge
- Occupations: Academic, lawyer
- Title: Chancellor of the University of Jaffna
- Term: 1984–2004
- Predecessor: V. Manicavasagar

Thambiah Nadaraja (Tamil: தம்பையா நடராச; 27 December 1917 – 20 January 2004) was a Sri Lankan academic, lawyer and author. He was dean of the Faculty of Law at the University of Ceylon and chancellor of the University of Jaffna.

== Early life and family ==
Nadaraja was born on 27 December 1927. He was the son of Murugesar Thambiah, a wealthy landowner, and Sivanandam, fourth daughter of Sir P. Arunachalam. He was educated at Royal College, Colombo where he won several prizes including the Shakespeare prize. After school he joined the University College, Colombo where he studied for one year before transferring to Trinity College, Cambridge to study law. In 1940 he gained First Class Honours in the law Tripos. He won several prizes at Trinity as well, including the Bond Prize for Roman Law, the Davies Prize for English Law and the Post Graduate Law Studentship. Whilst in the UK Nadaraja joined Lincoln's Inn from where he was awarded the First Class Certificate of Honour by the Council of Legal Education. He also won the Buchanan Prize at Lincoln's Inn.

He later obtained M.A and PhD degrees from the University of Cambridge.

Nadaraja married Sornam Ammai, daughter of Sir A. Mahadeva, in 1944. They had no children.

== Career ==
Nadaraja returned to Ceylon and joined the local bar as an advocate, working in the chambers of S. J. V. Chelvanayakam. In 1943, whilst still practising law, Nadaraja started lecturing at the Ceylon Law College. He joined the newly created Department of Law at the University of Ceylon in 1947, becoming a professor of law in 1951 following the death of Sir Francis Soertsz. He served as Dean of the Faculty of Arts from 1957 to 1960, succeeding Professor J. L. C. Rodrigo. In 1960 the Department of Law was upgraded to Faculty of Law and Nadaraja was appointed its first dean. He held the position until his retirement in 1982.

In the 1950s Nadaraja was a member of a three-man Royal Commission on the death penalty headed by Professor Needham. The commission's recommendations eventually led to the de facto abolition of the death penalty in Sri Lanka.

== Later life ==
Nadaraja was president of the Sri Lanka branch of the Royal Asiatic Society and Classical Association. He was also a member of the Law Commission and the Council of Legal Education.

Nadaraja was awarded honorary LLD and DLitt degrees from the University of Colombo and the University of Jaffna respectively. The Bar Council of Sri Lanka honoured Nadaraja's achievements by awarding him Life Membership Honoris Causa. In January 2012 the University of Colombo's launched the Professor T. Nadaraja Memorial Orationin memory of Nadaraja.

Nadaraja was chief trustee of the Sithy Vinayagar Temple in Colombo from 1945 onwards. He was also a trustee of the Sri Ponnambalavanesvara and Arunachaleswara temples in Colombo. These temples had been built by his family.

Nadaraja served as chancellor of the University of Jaffna from 1984 until his death on 20 January 2004. His remains were cremated on 21 January 2004.

== Works ==
- Roman-Dutch Law of Fideicommissa
- Legal System of Ceylon in its Historical Setting
- The Cult of Siva with Special References to the Dances of Siva
