= Piyaseeli Wijegunasinghe =

Sri Lankan writer

Piyaseeli Wijegunasingha
- Literary critic, Dean of Faculty, and Trotskyist Piyaseeli Wijegunasingha.
- Born: February 22, 1943
- Died: September 2, 2010 (aged 67)

Piyaseeli Wijegunasingha (February 20, 1943 – September 2, 2010) was a Sri Lankan literary critic, Trotskyist and Marxist scholar, and a member of Sri Lanka's Socialist Equality Party from 1968 until her death. She worked as a lecturer for 44 years at the University of Colombo, Sri Lanka, where she became Dean of Faculty for the Department of Sinhala.

== Life ==
Wijegunasinghe attended the University of Peradeniya and as a student led major political struggles in 1965. She became a committed socialist and internationalist, and in 1968 joined the Revolutionary Communist League, which would later become the Sri Lankan Socialist Equality Party (SEP). During her postgraduate studies in Britain, she was active in the UK Workers Revolutionary Party.

Wijegunasinghe began a new school of Marxist literary criticism in Sri Lanka, writing three books and delivering many lectures on this topic. She worked as a professor at the University of Colombo in the Sinhala department, where she taught a course on Marxist literary criticism. Wijegunasinghe translated Marxist books into Sinhala and was a writer for the World Socialist Web Site.

Wijegunasinghe was married to Wjie Dias, General Secretary of the Sri Lankan SEP, and had a son, Keerthi.

== Books ==
- A Materialist Study of Literature (1982)
- A Marxist Study of Modern Sinhala Literary Criticism (1987)
- A Reply to Sucharitha Gamlath: Marxist Principles on Criticism of the Arts (1995)
- The god of small things: A review and a reply (2004)

== Translations ==
The year of the publication of Sinhala translation is shown with titles.

- The Heritage We Defend by David North (1990)
- Gerry Healy and His Place in the History of the Fourth International by David North, Part 1 (1991) and Part 2 (1993)
- Bolshevism and the Avant-Garde Artists by David Walsh (1993)
- The Aesthetic Component of Socialism by David Walsh (1998)
- In Defence of Marxism by Leon Trotsky (2002)
