= P. Kanagasabapathy =

Ceylon Tamil academic

Professor P. Kanagasabapathy
- Born: 1923
- Died: January 1977 (aged 53–54)
- Education: Jaffna Hindu College; University of Ceylon; University of Cambridge
- Occupation: Academic
- Title: Dean of the Faculty of Science, University of Sri Lanka (Jaffna campus)
- Term: October 1974 – January 1977
- Successor: K. Kunaratnam

Perampalam Kanagasabapathy (1923–1977) was a Ceylon Tamil mathematician, academic and dean of the Faculty of Science at the Jaffna Campus of the University of Sri Lanka.

== Early life and family ==
Kanagasabapathy was born in 1923. He was the son of Iyampillai Perampalam from Erlalai in northern Ceylon. He was educated at Jaffna Hindu College. After school he joined the University of Ceylon. He then went to the University of Cambridge, graduating with a master's degree in mathematics.

Kanagasabapathy married Meenambikai in 1949. They had three children (Pathmini, Mythili and Nanada Kumaran).

== Career ==
Kanagasabapathy worked at the University of Ceylon, Peradeniya from 1950 to 1974 as a lecturer, senior lecturer and professor of mathematics. He joined the Jaffna Campus of the University of Sri Lanka in October 1974 as a professor of mathematics. He was head of the Department of Mathematics and Statistics and dean of the Faculty of Science at the Jaffna campus from October 1974 to January 1977. He died in January 1977. He published number of papers in Mathematical Journals.
