= K. Kailasapathy =

Sri Lankan journalist and academic (1933–1982)

Professor K. Kailasapathy
- க. கைலாசபதி
- Born: 5 April 1933; Kuala Lumpur, British Malaya (now Malaysia)
- Died: 6 December 1982 (aged 49); Colombo, Western Province, Sri Lanka
- Education: Jaffna Hindu College; Royal College, Colombo; University of Ceylon; University of Birmingham
- Occupation: Academic

Kanagasabapathy Kailasapathy (5 April 1933 – 6 December 1982) was a Sri Lankan journalist and academic. He was the first president of the Jaffna Campus of the University of Sri Lanka.

== Early life and family ==
Kailasapathy was born on 5 April 1933 in Kuala Lumpur, Malaya. His family moved from Malaya to Ceylon. He was then educated at the Jaffna Hindu College and Royal College, Colombo. After school he joined the University of Ceylon, Peradeniya. Whilst at Peradeniya Kailasapathy wrote for Virakesari and Tholkappiyam. He then went to University of Birmingham from where he obtained a Phd after producing a thesis on Tamil heroic poetry in 1968.

Kailasapathy married Sarvamangalam, daughter of N. Manicka Idaikaddar. They had two daughters.

== Career ==
After university Kailasapathy joined Lake House as a journalist. He became editor of the weekly edition of Thinakaran and then served as its editor-in-chief of between 1959 and 1961.

Kailasapathy then left journalism to take up a career in academia. He served as president of the Jaffna Campus of the University of Sri Lanka between August 1974 and July 1977.

Kailasapathy wrote numerous articles and more than ten books during his life.

== Death ==
Kailasapathy died on 6 December 1982 at the Colombo General Hospital.
