= Erlalai =

Erlalai ஏழாலை එලාලි
- Town
- Location within Northern Province
- Coordinates: 9°46′0″N 80°3′0″E
- Country: Sri Lanka
- Province: Northern
- District: Jaffna
- DS Division: Valikamam North

Erlalai is a large agricultural village, popular for its red soil. The village is centered around the road connecting Mallakam and Punnalaikkadduvan North. The village is divided into Erlalai centre, Erlalai North Erlalai South and Erlalai West. The vegetables produced in the village are believed to be tastier due to its red soil. The manioc or Cassava produced in the village is particularly famous.

== Notable people ==
P. Kanagasabapathy

K. Kunaratnam
