= ACES Coders =

ACES Coders is an algorithmic programming competition in Sri Lanka organized by the Association of Computer Engineering Students (ACES) of the Department of Computer Engineering, Faculty of Engineering, University of Peradeniya. ACES Coders commenced in 2011, as a training event for computer engineering students to improve their efficiency and accuracy to participate in similar online competitions such as IEEEXtreme and ACM ICPC. With the increase in popularity it is now organized on an annual basis and today it is one of the largest coding competitions that attracts participants from the universities and higher education institutions all over the country. The event usually lasts for 12 hours where the contestants are given a set of problems to solve using programming and problem-solving skills.

== Past winners ==
Version	Year	Winners	Runners up
5.0	2015	Darayo (University of Moratuwa)	Romankaarayo (University of Moratuwa)
6.0	2016	biteCode (University of Peradeniya)	Team Brute force (University of Moratuwa)
7.0	2019	biteCode (University of Peradeniya)	NoNameYet (University of Moratuwa)
8.0	2020		

== Awards ==
ACES coders award cash prizes along with certificates to the winning teams. The cash prizes have grown in size with years and the 2019 event came with a 150,000 LKR total split between the top 3 teams. It is predicted that the 2020 event will award cash in excess of 200,000 LKR.
