= W. L. Jeyasingham =

Sri Lankan Tamil teacher, geographer, and academic

W.L. Jeyasingham
- Born: William Luther Jeyasingham; 7 January 1916
- Died: December 1989 (aged 73)
- Education: St Patrick's College, Jaffna; St. Joseph's College, Colombo; University of Ceylon; Clark University
- Occupation: Academic
- Title: Dean of the Faculty of Arts, University of Jaffna
- Term: December 1978 – January 1979
- Predecessor: K. Kailasanatha Kurukkal & S. Gamalath
- Successor: S. Rajaratnam

William Luther "W.L." Jeyasingham (7 January 1916 – December 1989) was a Sri Lankan Tamil teacher, geographer, academic and dean of the Faculty of Arts, University of Jaffna.

== Early life and family ==
Jeyasingham was born on 7 January 1916. He was educated at St Patrick's College, Jaffna and St. Joseph's College, Colombo. He passed the Cambridge Seniors exam with honours and matriculated in 1933. After school he joined the University of Ceylon, graduating in 1939 with a degree in mathematics and geography.

Jeyasingham married Sarah Pushpam Mills. They had four sons and a daughter.

== Career ==
Jeyasingham joined Jaffna College as a teacher in 1940. He then won a Fulbright Scholarship to study at Clark University from where he received a MA degree in 1951 after producing a thesis titled The Kalutara District, with Special Reference to Settlements. He received a Phd from the university in 1958 after producing a thesis titled The Geography of Jaffna Town.

Jeyasingham then returned to Jaffna College, serving as head of the social services department and president of the college (1965–74).

Jeyasingham was later an associate professor and head of the department of geography at the University of Jaffna. He was dean of the Faculty of Arts at the university from December 1978 to January 1979.

== Later life ==
Jeyasingham moved to the United States in 1984. He died in December 1989, aged 73.
