= N. Shanmugalingam =

Nagalingam Shanmugalingam
- Education: University of Colombo; University of Jaffna
- Occupation: Academic
- Title: Vice-Chancellor of the University of Jaffna
- Term: December 2007 – March 2011
- Successor: Vasanthy Arasaratnam

Nagalingam Shanmugalingam is a Sri Lankan Tamil sociologist, academic and former vice-chancellor of the University of Jaffna.

== Early life ==
Shanmugalingam obtained a BEd degree from the University of Colombo. He later received MA and PhD degrees from the University of Jaffna.

== Career ==
Shanmugalingam joined the University of Jaffna in 1981 as an assistant lecturer in sociology and eventually became professor of sociology. He was later head of the Department of Sociology and Political Science at the university. He was appointed vice-chancellor of the university in December 2007. Shanmugalingam stood for re-election but in March 2011 President Mahinda Rajapaksa appointed Vasanthy Arasaratnam to the post of vice-chancellor.
