= Vigneswara College =

- விக்னேசுவரா கல்லூரி

Location
- College Road; Karaveddy, Jaffna District; Sri Lanka
- Coordinates: 9°47′28.50″N 80°11′44.40″E

Information
- School type: Public provincial 1AB
- Motto: Truth Triumphs
- Established: 1917.10.06
- School district: Vadamarachchi Education Zone
- Authority: Northern Provincial Council
- School number: 1008004
- Principal: P. Aravinthan
- Teaching staff: 45
- Grades: 6-13
- Gender: Co-educational
- Age range: 5-18

Vigneswara College (Tamil: விக்னேசுவரா கல்லூரி Vikṉēcuvarā Kallūri) is a provincial school in Karaveddy, Sri Lanka.

In 1952 the volleyball team of the college under the guidance of Mr. N.Sinnathamby (N.S.) became the National champions. The final was played in Gampaha. When the team came back, they were paraded from Nelliady Junction to the college with Thavil and Nathasvaram.

In 1953, Mr. Ganesharaja became first in the Northern Province Teachers Association examination for J.S.C. in the Jaffna District. He later graduated as an Engineer from University of Ceylon. In 1954 again the first place was taken by Mr. Kandasamy. He later became a doctor (MBBS, University of Ceylon). He is now in Canada. In 1955 the second prize was won by Mr. Ambihavaran. He became a Master Teacher and won an international essay competition. He now lives in Canada.

== See also ==
- List of schools in Northern Province, Sri Lanka
