= A. Thurairajah =

Sri Lankan academic (1934–1994)

Professor A. Thurairajah
- அ. துரைராசா

2nd Vice-Chancellor of the University of Jaffna
- In office September 1988 – April 1994
- Preceded by: S. Vithiananthan
- Succeeded by: K. Kunaratnam

Personal details
- Born: 10 November 1934 Kamparmalai, Ceylon
- Died: 11 June 1994 (aged 59) Colombo, Sri Lanka
- Education: Udupiddy AMC; Hartley College; University of Ceylon; University of Cambridge
- Profession: Academic
- Ethnicity: Sri Lankan Tamil

Alagiah Thurairajah (Tamil: அழகையா துரைராசா, romanized: Aḻakaiyā Turairācā; 10 November 1934 – 11 June 1994) was a Sri Lankan academic and vice-chancellor of the University of Jaffna.

== Early life and family ==
Thurairajah was born on 10 November 1934 in Kamparmalai in northern Ceylon. He was the son of Velupillai Alagiah and Sellammah from Imaiyanan in Vadamarachchi. He was educated at the Udupiddy American Mission College and Hartley College. After completing school he commenced studies at the University of Ceylon in July 1953, graduating with a BSc degree in civil engineering in 1957.

Thurairajah then served as an instructor in civil engineering at the university until March 1958 when he started working for the Public Works Department as a Junior Assistant Engineer for four months. He then went to the University of Cambridge on a scholarship after Kenneth H. Roscoe chose him to be his research student. Between October 1958 and December 1961 Thurairajah assisted Roscoe in his research into shear properties of soils. This research earned Thurairajah a PhD in June 1962 with a thesis titled Some shear properties of kaolin and of sand.

Thurairajah married Rajeswari. They had three daughters and two sons. His younger son, Alahesh Thurairajah continued the Legacy of his father and earned a great reputation in geotechnical community. He is currently serving as President and Principal of a Geotechnical Firm 'Earth Mechanics, Inc.', based near Los Angeles, California.

== Career ==
After Cambridge Thurairajah worked in London for a company called Terreasearch Ltd for a while in 1962 before returning to Ceylon. He joined the University of Ceylon as a lecturer. He was visiting assistant professor at the University of Waterloo before becoming Professor of Civil Engineering in 1971 at the University of Ceylon. He was Dean of the Faculty of Engineering at the Peradeniya Campus of the University of Sri Lanka from May 1975 to September 1977, and February 1982 to February 1985. He was visiting professor at the University of British Columbia between October 1977 and December 1978. He was Dean of the Faculty of Engineering at the Open University of Sri Lanka from April 1987 to August 1988.

Thurairajah became vice-chancellor of the University of Jaffna in September 1988. He resigned in March 1994 on medical grounds.

Thurairajah moved to Colombo for treatment and re-joined the Open University. He died on 11 June 1994 in Colombo due to cardiovascular failure brought about by leukaemia. He was posthumously awarded the Maamanithar (Great Man) honour by the LTTE Liberation Tigers of Tamil Eelam.

Thurairajah was a fellow of the National Academy of Sciences (Sri Lanka) from 1977; Institution of Civil Engineers (Sri Lanka) from 1979; and the Institution of Civil Engineers (UK) from May 1985. He was president of the National Academy of Sciences (Sri Lanka) in 1986. He was president of the Institution of Civil Engineers (Sri Lanka) between October 1989 to October 1990. He was an expert on soil engineering.
