= Vasanthy Arasaratnam =

Sri Lankan Tamil academic

Professor Vasanthy Arasaratnam
- வசந்தி அரசரத்தினம்
- Education: University of Madras; University of Colombo; University of Jaffna
- Occupation: Academic
- Title: Vice-Chancellor of the University of Jaffna
- Term: March 2011 – April 2017
- Predecessor: N. Shanmugalingam
- Successor: R. Vigneswaran

Professor Vasanthy Arasaratnam (Tamil: வசந்தி அரசரத்தினம்) is a Sri Lankan Tamil biochemist, academic and former vice-chancellor of the University of Jaffna.

== Early life ==
Arasaratnam obtained a BSc degree from the University of Madras. She later received a MSc degree from the University of Colombo and a Phd degree from the University of Jaffna.

== Career ==
Arasaratnam was head of Department of Biochemistry at the University of Jaffna from January 1990 to September 1996 and from October 1997 to December 2000. She was dean of the Faculty of Medicine between August 2000 and August 2003. She was head of the Department of Pharmacology in September 2003 and was elected to the university's senate in 2004. She was appointed vice-chancellor of the university in March 2011.
