= V. Manicavasagar =

Sri Lankan judge and lawyer (1906–1993)

Manicavasagar Vaithialingam
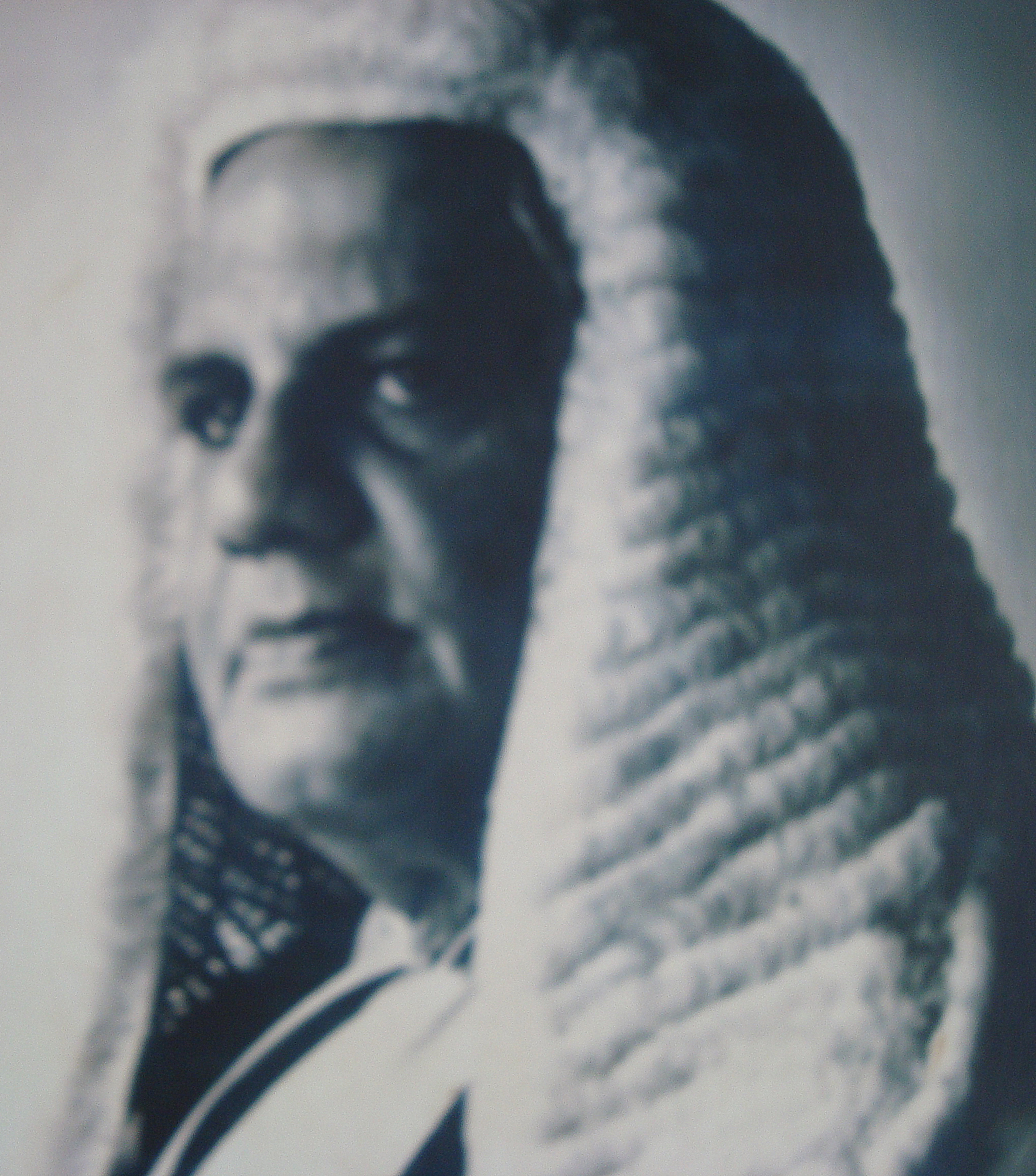

Puisne Justice of the Supreme Court of Ceylon
- Incumbent
- Assumed office December 17, 1964
- Appointed by: Sirimavo Bandaranaike

Chairman of the Commercial Bank of Ceylon
- In office April 1980 – March 1985

Chancellor of the University of Jaffna
- In office January 1, 1979 – 1984

Personal details
- Born: December 17, 1906 Colombo, British Ceylon
- Died: December 27, 1993 (aged 87) Colombo, Sri Lanka
- Spouse: Valamba Manicavasagar née Selliah
- Relations: Ponnambalam Arunachalam, Arunachalam Mahadeva, D. M. Swaminathan Siva Selliah
- Children: Arunachala Manicavasagar, Nirmala Ragunanthan née Manicavasagar
- Education: Colombo Law College, Royal College Colombo

Deshamanya Manicavasagar Vaithialingam (December 17, 1906 - December 12, 1993) was a Sri Lankan lawyer, Puisne Justice of the Supreme Court of Sri Lanka, Chancellor of the University of Jaffna and Chairman of the Commercial Bank of Ceylon.

== Early years ==
Vaithialingam was born on December 17, 1906, to prominent Colombo stockbroker Mudaliyar Arunachala Vaithialingam. Both his paternal and maternal family hails from the affluent town of Manipay, Jaffna. He began his education at the Royal College, Colombo where he excelled in academics and went on to obtain a degree in law from the Colombo Law College.

== Judicial career ==
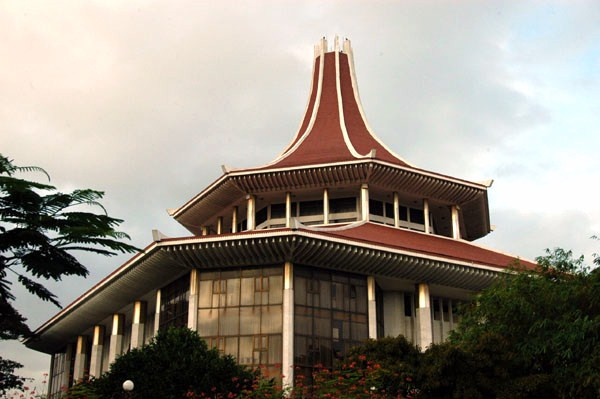
The Supreme Court of Sri Lanka in Colombo

Vaithialingam joined the judicial service 9 years after being called to the bar, as an Acting Magistrate in Mallakan. For over two decades, he functioned as a Magistrate and District Judge in different parts of the island and in October, 1962, he was appointed a Commissioner of Assize. He continued as such until his appointment to the Supreme Court of Ceylon in 1964 by Prime Minister Sirimavo Bandaranaike.

== Judgments ==
Mentioned below are a few of the numerous judgments in which Justice Vaithialingam was involved. All of the cases below are from the Supreme Court of Sri Lanka and no judgments from lower courts have been included.

=== Cases presided over ===
- Mohideen v. Village Council, Nintavur - NLR - 469 of 68 [1965] LKSC 22; (1965) 68 NLR 469 (14 September 1965).
- The Solicitor General v. WM Podisira - NLR - 502 of 67 [1965] LKSC 23; (1965) 67 NLR 502 (27 August 1965)
- Thenabandu v. Samarasekera - NLR - 472 of 70 [1967] LKSC 1; (1967) 70 NLR 472 (26 November 1967)
- Jayasena v. The Queen - NLR - 369 of 68 [1966] LKSC 14; (1966) 68 NLR 369 (12 May 1966)
- Dahanayake v. Kannangara - NLR - 260 of 68 [1966] LKSC 24; (1966) 68 NLR 260 (7 February 1966)
- Don Sadiris.L v. Heenhamy.L - NLR - 17 of 68 [1965] LKSC 10; (1965) 68 NLR 17 (20 July 1965)
- Babanisa v. Ukku - NLR - 305 of 68 [1965] LKSC 27; (1965) 68 NLR 305 (13 January 1965)
- The Queen v. Abeysinghe - NLR - 386 of 68 [1965] LKSC 11; (1965) 68 NLR 386 (21 June 1965

==== Cases in which referred to for Common Law purposes ====
- Arumugam Coomaraswamy v. Andris Appuhamy and Others - SLR - 219, Vol 2 of 1985 [1985] LKSC 8; (1985) 2 Sri LR 219 (19 June 1985)
- Wellington v. Amerasinghe - SLR - 41, Vol 1 of 1987 [1986] LKSC 38; (1987) 1 Sri LR 41 (10 November 1986)
- Subair v. Isthikar - NLR - 397 of 77 [1974] LKSC 5; (1974) 77 NLR 397 (3 July 1974)
- WAHemadasa v. JL Sirisena - NLR - 201 of 69 [1966] LKSC 29; (1966) 69 NLR 201 (22 September 1966)
- Jeyaraj Fernandopulle v. Premachandra De Silva and Others - SLR - 70, Vol 1 of 1996 [1996] LKSC 14; (1996) 1 Sri LR 70 (9 July 1996)
- Gunaratne Menike v. Jayatileke Banda - SLR - 152, Vol 2 of 1995 [1994] LKSC 43; (1995) 2 Sri LR 152 (13 December 1994)

== Post-Judicial Career ==
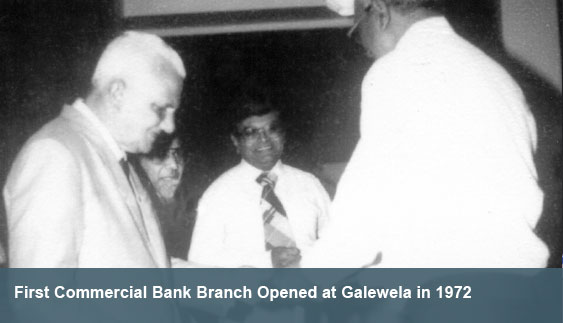
Justice V. Manicavasagar (left) opening the first Commercial Bank Branch in Galewela

After retiring from the Supreme Court, Vaithialingam was appointed Chairman of the Commercial Bank of Ceylon and was then appointed as the first Chancellor of the University of Jaffna.

In retirement, he was a member of both the Citizen Committee and the Delimitation Committee among many others. A devote Hindu, he also served as President of the Educational Society for many years.

=== As Chancellor of the University of Jaffna ===
Vaithialingam was appointed as the first Chancellor of the University of Jaffna by the President of Sri Lanka with effect from the first of January, 1979. In the course of his tenure, which lasted half a decade, he presided over the first convocation held at the Veerasingam Hall on the 13th of September 1980 and also delivered the very first convocation address. He was also conferred with a Doctorate by the university.

=== Deshamanya ===
Vaithialingam was awarded the Deshamanya Award within two years of its founding in 1987. He was the first Sri Lankan Tamil to receive the award and the appearance of common ground between the government and a prominent Tamil caused an adverse reaction from the Liberation Tigers of Tamil Eelam. The LTTE called on him to refuse the reward, if he valued his life; however, Vaithialingam defied the outfit and accepted the honour.

=== Ethnic Conflict ===
In the citizens committee chaired by his good friend and former colleague on the bench, O. L. de Kretser, he worked on the Report of the Commission of Inquiry, on the Tragedy of January Tenth 1974 along with Bishop Sabapathy Kulendran of the Church of South India in Jaffna.

==== Language Rights ====
"I went to the office of the Government Agent in Colombo in July 1973. In order to find my way to the officer I wanted to meet, I saw a board in Sinhala only. I enquired in English from the clerk who was seated behind the counter as to what it said. His reply in Sinhala was “Don’t you know how to read Sinhala?” I replied in English that I could not understand what he said. He said in Sinhala: “Go and learn Sinhala and come back.” A bystander told me what the board conveyed" - Justice Manicavasagar Vaithalingam 1974

— Refugee Studies Centre of the University of Oxford, Children and Armed Conflict in Sri Lanka, Jason Hart, PHD

== Personal life ==
Vaithialingam married Valamba, the eldest daughter of Nannithamby Selliah of Rosmead Place - son of Visva Udayar Sangarapillai Nannithamby, Broker of Mackwood & Co. & his wife Sellam, daughter of Kandarthamby Kandiah (Chattambiar) - and sister of Justice Siva Selliah, High Court Judge.

They have two children: (1)Arunachala Manicavasagar, JP, who married Skandaleela - daughter of Proctor Sivakolundu Rajendran (JP, NP) and his wife Kamalambigai, youngest daughter of Stowell Elaithamby Murgesampillai - and his younger sister, (2)Nirmala Ragunanthan, who was married to the late Ragunanthan Thambimuthu, managing director of Raniyo (Pvt) Ltd. Both of his children continue to live in Colombo while his grandchildren reside in North America.

== Notes ==
- Commons:File:Justice V. Manicavasagar Supreme Court Reference 1.JPG
- Commons:File:Justice V. Manicavasagar Supreme Court Reference 2.JPG
- Commons:File:Justice V. Manicavasagar Supreme Court Reference 3.JPG
- Commons:File:Justice V. Manicavasagar Supreme Court Reference 4.JPG
- Commons:File:Justice V. Manicavasagar Supreme Court Reference 5.JPG
