= M. Nadarajasundaram =

Professor M. Nadarajasundaram
- Education: Hartley College; University of Ceylon; University of Jaffna
- Occupation: Academic

Professor Manikam Nadarajasundaram is a Sri Lankan academic and former dean of the Faculty of Management Studies and Commerce at the University of Jaffna.

== Early life and family ==
Nadarajasundaram was educated at Hartley College between 1954 and 1965. He was a keen sportsman and won school colours in cricket, football and athletics. He took part in island-wide competitions in cricket, football and other sports. He was part of the Jaffna Schools Cricket XI team which played All Indian School Boys in Jaffna, scoring 94 runs. He was also part of the Ceylon National Schools Cricket XI which played against All Indian School Boys in Colombo in 1964. After school he joined the University of Ceylon, Peradeniya in 1965, graduating with an honours degree in economics. He played cricket and football for the university, captaining the cricket team in 1970. He was part of the Central Province Cricket XI team which played against England in 1969 and Australia in 1970. Nadarajasundaram obtained a master's degree in economics from the University of Jaffna in 1983.

== Career ==
Nadarajasundaram joined the National Savings Bank in 1973 as a research officer/accountant.

Nadarajasundaram then became a senior lecturer Department of Commerce and Management Studies at the University of Jaffna. He became head of the Department of Commerce and Management Studies in May 1993. In September 1994 the department was split into two departments, Management Studies and Commerce, and Nadarajasundaram was appointed head of the former. The Faculty of Management Studies and Commerce was established in May 1999 and Nadarajasundaram became its first dean. He remained dean until the end of May 2005.
