= Udupiddy =

- Location in Sri Lanka
- Coordinates: 9°48′16″N 80°09′43″E
- Country: Sri Lanka
- Province: Northern Province

Population
  - Total: 1,414
- Time zone: UTC+5:30 (India Standard Time)

Udupiddy is a small town located in the Jaffna District in the Northern Province of Sri Lanka. Udupiddy roughly translates to "get dressed". The town has a population of 1,414 and an area of 1.217 km².

== Climate ==
Udupiddy has a tropical and dry climate per the Köppen climate classification.

== Geography ==
Udupiddy has two national schools, them being Udupiddy American Mission College and Udupiddy Girls' College, both on the east side of the city. In Udupiddy, there is only one lake, it being Viraachi Kalam. A popular highway in the area is B-grade road B418.

== Tourism ==
Udupiddy is known for its beaches and turquoise water, a popular one being the Kankesanthurai Beach. The four beaches are located at or near settlements.

== Demographics ==
The ratio between the male-female population is 45.9% to 54.1%. The population of Udupiddy drastically increased by 40.8% between 1975 and 2015. In 1975, the population was 1,004, in 1990 it was 1,313, in 2000 it was 1,405, and in 2015 it was 1,414. The population density grew from 825.1 km² in 1975 to 1,162 km² in 2015. The HDI is 0.766 as of 2015. The population growth from 2000 to 2015 was 0.6%.

The median age is 28.5 years of age, with the median age for men being 26.4 years of age, and 30.2 for women. The majority of the population is between 15-19.

== See also ==
- List of towns in Northern Province, Sri Lanka
