= University of Jaffna =

University in Jaffna, Sri Lanka

- யாழ்ப்பாணப் பல்கலைக்கழகம் යාපනය විශ්වවිද්‍යාලය
- Former name: University of Sri Lanka (Jaffna Campus)
- Motto: மெய்ப் பொருள் காண்பது அறிவு
- Motto in English: Discernment is wisdom
- Type: Public research university
- Established: 1 August 1974; 52 years ago
- Accreditation: University Grants Commission (Sri Lanka)
- Affiliations: University Grants Commission (Sri Lanka), Association of Commonwealth Universities, International Association of Universities
- Budget: Rs. 2.2 billion (2016, recurrent); Rs. 1.2 billion (2016, capital)
- Chancellor: Rajaratnam Kumaravadivel
- Vice-Chancellor: Thirunavukkarasu Velnampy
- Academic staff: 611
- Administrative staff: 731
- Students: 7,972
- Undergraduates: 7,393
- Postgraduates: 531
- Doctoral students: 57
- Location: Jaffna, Northern Province, Sri Lanka; 9°41′04.90″N 80°01′18.90″E
- Campus: Multiple campuses
- Website: www.jfn.ac.lk

The University of Jaffna (Tamil: யாழ்ப்பாணப் பல்கலைக்கழகம், romanized: Yāḻppāṇap Palkalaikkaḻakam; Sinhala: යාපනය විශ්වවිද්‍යාලය, Yāpanaya Wiśwawidyālaya; abbreviated UoJ) is a public university in Jaffna, Sri Lanka. Established in 1974 as the sixth campus of the University of Sri Lanka, it became an independent, autonomous university in 1979.

The main campus is located in Thirunelvely, Jaffna. It also has faculties in Ariviyal Nagar near Kilinochchi, Kaithady and Maruthanarmadam near Chunnakam. It has thirteen faculties (Agriculture, Alied Health Science, Applied Science, Arts, Business Studies, Engineering, Graduate Studies, Hindu Studies, Management Studies and Commerce, Medicine, Science, Technology, and Technological Studies) and thirteen other academic units/centres. The university offers undergraduate and postgraduate courses that award various degrees.

In 2016 the university had 7,972 students and 1,342 employees. It is the seventh largest university in Sri Lanka in student numbers. In 2015/16 the university admitted 3,009 undergraduates. UoJ had a recurrent budget of Rs. 2.2 billion and a capital budget of Rs. 1.2 billion in 2016. Its income in 2016 was Rs. 3.5 billion of which Rs. 3.4 billion (98%) was a grant from the central government in Colombo.

The chancellor and the Vice-chancellor are Emeritus Professor Rajaratnam Kumaravadivel and Professor Sivakolundu Srisatkunarajah respectively. UoJ is a member of the Association of Commonwealth Universities.

== History ==
=== University of Sri Lanka Jaffna campus ===
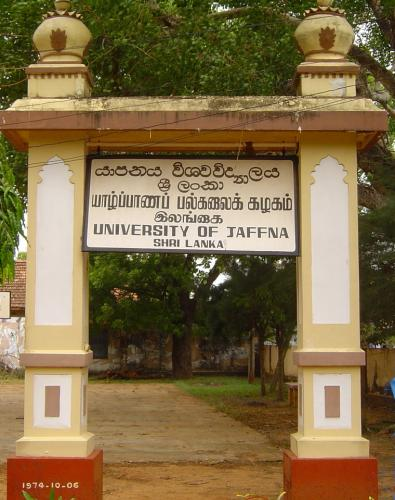
The first gate of the university made in 1974

On 15 July 1974 Badi-ud-din Mahmud, Minister of Education and Pro-Chancellor of the University of Sri Lanka, declared that the sixth campus of the University of Sri Lanka would be established in Jaffna. K. Kailasapathy, head of the Department of Tamil and Hindu studies of the Vidyalankara campus of the University of Sri Lanka, was appointed as the first president of the Jaffna campus. Extraordinary gazette no. 121/15 was published on 25 July 1974 establishing the Jaffna Campus. The new campus started functioning on 1 August 1974 at the Parameswara College premises in Thirunelvely some 4 km north of Jaffna city centre. Parameswara College had been founded in 1921 by P. Ramanathan.

The campus had approval for three faculties (Humanities, Law and Science) and one department (Physical Education). Only the Humanities and Science faculties were functioning when the campus started taking students in October 1974. The Faculty of Humanities and campus administration were based at Thirunelvely. The Faculty of Science was based at the undergraduate section of Jaffna College, Vaddukoddai which had been taken over by the government on 13 August 1974.

The Faculty of Humanities was renamed Faculty of Arts in 1975. The Ramanathan Academy of Fine Arts, based at Ramanathan College in Maruthanarmadam, was taken over by the Jaffna Campus on 1 December 1975. The Faculty of Science moved to Thirunelvely in June 1978 and the Jaffna College site was returned to its former owners the Jaffna Diocese of the Church of South India. The Faculty of Medicine was established on 7 August 1978 with its base at the Ayurvedic Hospital in Kaithady.

=== University of Jaffna ===
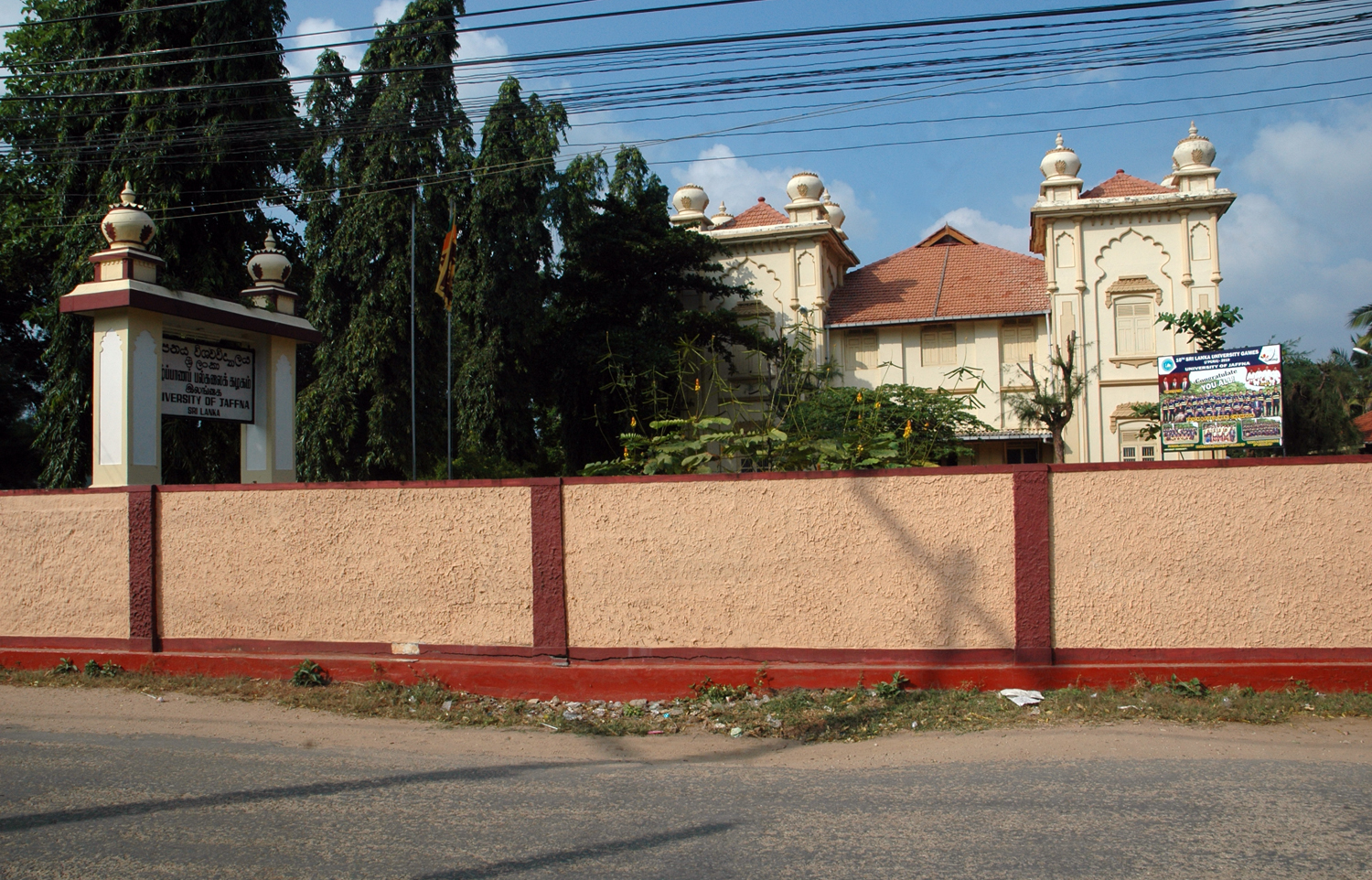
A photo captured from outside road

The Universities Act No. 16 of 1978 radically altered university education in Sri Lanka. The University of Sri Lanka was abolished and its six campuses (Colombo, Peradeniya, Sri Jayewardenepura, Kelaniya, Moratuwa and Jaffna) were each elevated to independent, autonomous universities. A gazette was issued on 22 December 1978 establishing the University of Jaffna with effect from 1 January 1979.

The Faculty of Medicine was shifted to Thirunelvely in 1981. Construction of a new library, student centre and arts block began in 1981 but were halted due to the civil war. The Siddha section of the Institute of Indigenous Medicine was moved from the University of Colombo to the University of Jaffna in July 1984. The partially completed library started functioning in 1986.

The escalation of hostilities between the Indian Peace Keeping Force and the rebel Liberation Tigers of Tamil Eelam in late 1987 severely affected the university. UoJ buildings and equipment suffered extensive damage. Students and academic/non-academic staff were killed. During the late 1980s/early 1990s, when most of the Jaffna Peninsula including Jaffna city was under LTTE control, the university suffered frequent aerial bombings, shortage of essential goods due to the economic blockade, shortage of academic staff many of whom had fled abroad and a general disturbance of academic life due to the frequent curfews.

The university was given approval in 1985 to establish a Faculty of Agriculture in Kilinochchi. Construction of a new building in Kilinochchi began in 1986 but was abandoned in 1987 due to the civil war. In October 1989 approval was given to establish a Faculty of Engineering in Kilinochchi, but the civil war prevented this. The Faculty of Agriculture started functioning in December 1990 at buildings belonging to the Regional Agriculture Research and Development Centre and the District Training Centre of Department of Agriculture in Kilinochchi.

In October 1995, as the Sri Lankan military launched a military offensive to recapture the Jaffna peninsula, virtually the entire population of the Valikamam region fled to other parts of the peninsula and the Vanni. The university administration was transferred to the Faculty of Agriculture in Kilinochchi. Most of the equipment and furniture at Thirunelvely was lost during the absence. The university's administration returned to Thirunelvely in 1996 after the military had recaptured most of the peninsula including Jaffna city. The escalation of hostilities in the Vanni in 1996 caused severe disruption to the Faculty of Agriculture which was forced to move several times. The University Council decided to move the faculty. In August 1997 studies re-commenced at the faculty's new premises in Jaffna.

A gazette was issued on 26 March 1997 upgrading the Northern Province Affiliated University College (NPAUC) in Vavuniya to the Vavuniya campus of the University of Jaffna. The NPAUC was established in 1991 to offer courses in mathematical sciences, accountancy and finance. The Vavuniya Campus had two faculties - Applied Science and Business Studies - each with two departments. In 1999 the Faculty of Management Studies and Commerce was created from parts of the Faculty of Arts. The Faculty of Graduate Studies was created in the same year.

Construction of a new building for the Faculty of Agriculture at Ariviyal Nagar, Kilinochchi began after the end of the civil war in 2009. The faculty expects to relocate to Ariviyal Nagar in 2013. In April 2011 the university's senate approved the establishment of a Faculty of Engineering in Kilinochchi next to the Faculty of Agriculture. The first batch of students are expected to be admitted in September 2012.

The Faculty of Technology was established in 2016. The faculty is expected to admit its first students towards the end of 2016. It will be located near the Faculty of Agriculture and Faculty of Engineering in Kilinochchi.

== Campus ==
Locations of University of Jaffna sites

The university is based at five sites: Thirunelvely, Vavuniya, Ariviyal Nagar, Kaithady and Maruthanarmadam.

The Thirunelvely campus is split into two. The main site off Ramanathan Road contains three faculties - Arts, Management Studies & Commerce and Science - as well as the main administrative departments, library and student complex. The second site off Adiyapatham Road contains the Medicine faculty. The Faculty of Graduate Studies is based in a rented house on Ramanathan Road opposite the university.

The Vavuniya campus is based at several sites in the town as well as in the outskirts of Vavuniya. The campus plans move all its functions to the spacious Pambaimadhu site on the Mannar-Vavuniya Road. This site houses the Faculty of Business Studies and student hostels. The Faculty of Applied Science is in Vavuniya.

The faculties of Agriculture, Engineering and Technology are based at Ariviyal Nagar near Murukandy, south of Kilinochchi.

The Ramanathan Academy of Fine Arts is in Marthanamadam and the Siddha Medicine Unit is in Kaithady.

== Organisation and administration ==
The current chancellor is Emeritus Professor R. Kumaravadivel, appointed by the president of Sri Lanka in August 2025. The vice-chancellor is Professor S. Srisatkunarajah who took office on 2020. The current rector of the Vavuniya Campus is T. Mangaleswaran. The most senior non-academic staff is registrar V. Kandeepan.

The University of Jaffna has ten faculties and ten other academic units/centres:

Faculties

- Faculty of Agriculture
- Faculty of Allied Health Science
- Faculty of Arts
- Faculty of Engineering
- Faculty of Graduate Studies
- Faculty of Hindu Studies
- Faculty of Management Studies and Commerce
- Faculty of Medicine
- Faculty of Science
- Faculty of Technology
- Sir Ponnambalam Ramanathan Faculty of Performing and Visual Arts

Units/Centres

- Career Guidance Unit
- Computer Centre
- Internal Quality Assurance Unit
- Open and Distance Learning Center
- Physical Education Unit
- Siddha Medicine Unit
- Staff Development Centre
- Sports Science Unit
- Strategic Planning & MIS Unit
- UBL Cell

=== Faculty of Agriculture ===
Deans of the Faculty of Agriculture
| Dean | Took office | Left office |
|---|---|---|
| S. Kandiah | October 1990 | March 1991 |
| A. Navaratnarajah | April 1991 | October 1992 |
| S. Mohanadas | October 1992 | March 1994 |
| A. Navaratnarajah | March 1994 | March 1997 |
| R. Vijayaratnam | May 1997 | May 2000 |
| S. Rajadurai | May 2000 | June 2006 |
| S. Sivachandiran | June 2006 | June 2012 |
| G. Mikunthan | June 2012 | December 2013 |
| S. Sivachandiran | January 2014 | June 2015 |
| T. Mikunthan | June 2015 | June 2018 |

The University of Jaffna started campaigning for the establishment of a Faculty of Agriculture at the university in 1981. The University Grants Commission gave its approval in 1985. The town of Kilinochchi was identified as a suitable location for the new faculty and construction of a new building began in 1986. Construction was abandoned in 1987 due to the civil war. The new faculty started functioning in December 1990 at buildings belonging to the Regional Agriculture Research and Development Centre (RARDC) and the District Training Centre of Department of Agriculture in Kilinochchi.

The escalation of hostilities in the Vanni in 1996 caused severe disruption to the faculty, which was forced to move several times. The University Council decided to move the faculty to Jaffna and in August 1997 studies re-commenced at the faculty's new premises in Jaffna.

Construction of a new building for the faculty at Ariviyal Nagar, Kilinochch began after the end of the civil war in 2009. This building complex was renovated with the state fund and Faculty of Agriculture started to function in that place since December 2014. During this year two foreign funded projects from India and Japan were discussed, formulated and submitted for funding aiming to improving the infrastructure facilities at the faculty. The faculty has established crop and livestock farms in Ariviyal Nagar, Kilinochchi to provide a sound practical training in Agriculture to the students. To support the academic programmes as well as the outreach activities, the faculty has absorbed an Integrated Farm and Training center located at Puliyankulum. Meantime a skill development center consisting of Conference hall, Computer unit, Library, Canteen and student complex was built with the financial support of the Government of India. These facilities are well utilized by the students as well as the postgraduate students and staff. A full-fledged Research and Training Complex has been established with the support of Japan International Cooperation Agency (JICA) in 2021. At present, the Faculty of Agriculture is functioning with quite enough facilities for teaching, learning and research. The faculty offers undergraduate courses which lead to Bachelor of Science in Agriculture (B.Sc.(Agr.)) degrees.

The faculty is currently divided into six departments:

- Department of Agricultural Biology
- Department of Agricultural Economics
- Department of Agronomy
- Department of Agricultural Chemistry
- Department of Agricultural Engineering
- Department of Animal Science

The faculty's current dean and senior assistant registrar are S.Vasantharuba and A.P.Vijeyaratnam respectively. The faculty had 500 undergraduate students and 39 permanent academic staff in 2022.

=== Faculty of Allied Health Sciences ===
The Faculty of Allied Health Sciences has a notable history marked by significant milestones. It began in 2001 when the University Grants Commission (UGC) encouraged universities to introduce self-financing courses. Seizing this opportunity, the Faculty of Medicine (FoM) at the University of Jaffna (UoJ) initiated certificate and diploma courses in allied health disciplines, with support from the World Health Organization (WHO).

In 2003, the UGC invited discussions on the introduction of six Allied Health Sciences (AHS) degree programs in Sri Lankan universities. The FoM of UoJ decided to commence three degree programs: Bachelor of Science in Medical Laboratory Sciences (MLS), Bachelor of Science in Nursing, and Bachelor of Pharmacy. The inauguration of these programs took place in 2006, with the first batch of students admitted.

In 2008, Prof. Vasanthi Arasaratnam was appointed as the Administrative Coordinator, overseeing all three degree programs. Recognizing the importance of the AHS programs, the FoM allocated funds to construct a new AHS building. The successful implementation of the degree programs led to the promotion of AHS as a Unit by the UGC in 2011.

In 2012, the construction of the new AHS building was completed, providing improved infrastructure for the programs. The UAHS celebrated its 10th anniversary in 2016 and proposed an upgrade from a Unit to a Faculty. The UAHS faced challenges such as increased student intake and infrastructure limitations, but efforts were made to improve facilities and resources.

In 2019, the UGC approved the establishment of the Faculty of Allied Health Sciences (FAHS) with three departments: Medical Laboratory Sciences, Nursing, and Pharmacy. The annual student intake was increased, and plans were made to construct a state-of-the-art building to accommodate the growing needs of the faculty.

In 2021, the Sports Sciences Unit was incorporated into FAHS, and the Department of Human Biological Sciences was established in 2023. The faculty continues to face challenges related to student accommodation and laboratory facilities, but efforts are underway to address these issues.

=== Faculty of Applied Sciences ===
Deans of the Faculty of Applied Sciences
| Dean | Took office | Left office |
|---|---|---|
| K. A. Srikrishnaraj | | |
| S. Kanaganathan | | |
| J. C. N. Rajendra | | |
| S. Krishnakumar | | |
| S. Kuhanesan | | |

The Faculty of Applied Sciences was established when the Vavuniya Campus of the University of Jaffna was created in April 1997.

The faculty offers undergraduate courses which lead to Bachelor of Information and Communication Technology (B.I.C.T.) and Bachelor of Science (B.Sc.) degrees.

The faculty is currently divided into two departments:

- Department of Bio-Science
- Department of Physical Science

The faculty's current dean and assistant registrar are S. Kuhanesan and Iyathurai Thayaparan respectively. The faculty had 372 undergraduate students and 44 academic staff (26 permanent, 18 temporary) in 2016.

=== Faculty of Arts ===
Deans of the Faculty of Arts
| Dean | Took office | Left office |
|---|---|---|
| K. Indrapala | October 1974 | May 1976 |
| K. Kailasanatha Kurukkal; Sucharitha Gamlath | June 1976 | December 1978 |
| W. L. Jeyasingham | December 1978 | January 1979 |
| S. Rajaratnam | January 1979 | January 1981 |
| S. Kailasapathy | January 1981 | December 1982 |
| K. Indrapala | December 1982 | July 1984 |
| N. Balakrishnan | July 1984 | March 1991 |
| P. Balasundarampillai | March 1991 | March 1997 |
| A. Sanmugadas | March 1997 | June 1999 |
| S. Balachandiran | June 1999 | October 2001 |
| P. Gopalakrishna Iyer | November 2001 | August 2004 |
| R. Sivachandran | August 2004 | August 2007 |
| S. Krishnarajah | August 2007 | May 2009 |
| N. Gnanakumaran | May 2009 | July 2012 |
| V. P. Sivanathan | July 2012 | July 2015 |
| N. Gnanakumaran | July 2015 | January 2017 |
| K. Suthakar | January 2017 | January 2023 |
| S. Raguram | January 2023 | present |

The Jaffna Campus of the University of Sri Lanka started functioning in October 1974 with two faculties: Faculty of Humanities and Faculty of Science. The Faculty of Humanities was based at Parameshwara College in Thirunelveli. K. Indrapala, senior lecturer in history at the Peradeniya Campus of the University of Sri Lanka, was appointed the first dean of the Faculty of Humanities. The faculty had four departments: Hindu Civilization, History, Sinhala and Tamil.

The faculty was renamed as the Faculty of Arts in 1975. The Ramanathan Academy of Fine Arts (RAFA) was taken over by the University of Sri Lanka in 1975 and placed under the Faculty of Arts. RAFA had two departments: Dance and Music. Eight new departments were created: Sanskrit (1975), Education (1980), Language and Cultural Studies (1981), Fine Arts (1982), Economics, Geography, Islamic Civilization and Philosophy.

Following the Black July riots the Institute of Indigenous Medicine affiliated to the University of Colombo was transferred to the University of Jaffna as a department under the Faculty of Arts in 1984. The Department of Language and Cultural Studies was split into the Department of Linguistics and English and Department of Christian and Islamic Civilization in 1989. The Department of Siddha Medicine was removed from the faculty in October 1993 and now functions directly under the control of the vice chancellor. The Department of Political Science and Sociology was created in July 1998 from the Department of Economics. The Department of Law was created in May 2005. The Department of Political Science and Sociology was split into the Department of Political Science and Department of Sociology in December 2007.

The faculty offers undergraduate courses which lead to Bachelor of Arts (B.A.), Bachelor of Fine Arts (B.F.A.) and Bachelor of Law (LL.B.) degrees.

The faculty is currently divided into sixteen departments two of which are based at the Ramanathan Academy of Fine Arts:

- Department of Christian & Islamic Civilization
- Department of Dance (Ramanathan Academy of Fine Arts)
- Department of Economics
- Department of Education
- Department of English Language Teaching
- Department of Fine Arts
- Department of Geography
- Department of Hindu Civilization
- Department of History
- Department of Law
- Department of Linguistics and English
- Department of Music (Ramanathan Academy of Fine Arts)
- Department of Philosophy
- Department of Political Science
- Department of Media Studies
- Department of Sanskrit
- Department of Sociology
- Department of Tamil

The faculty's current dean and deputy registrar are K. Suthakar and M. Ganeshalingam respectively. The faculty had 2,751 undergraduate students and 169 academic staff (126 permanent, 43 temporary) in 2016.

=== Faculty of Business Studies ===
Deans of the Faculty of Business Studies
| Dean | Took office | Left office |
|---|---|---|
| R. Nanthakumaran | | |
| P. Selvarajan | | |
| T. Mangaleswaran | | |
| A. Pushpanathan | | |

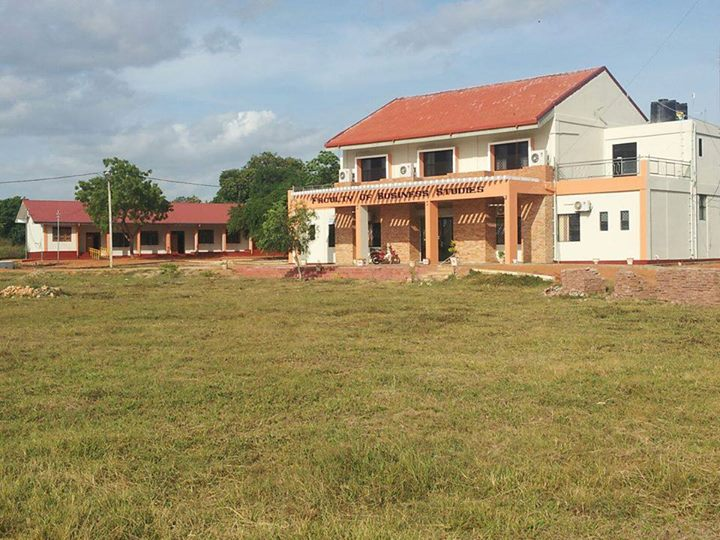
Dean's Office, Faculty of Business Studies

The Faculty of Business Studies was established when the Vavuniya Campus of the University of Jaffna was created in April 1997.

The faculty offers undergraduate courses which lead to Bachelor of Business Management degrees.

The faculty is currently divided into two departments:

- Department of Accountancy and Finance
- Department of Economics and Management

The faculty's current dean and assistant registrar are A. Pushpanathan and D. Sooriyakumar respectively. The faculty had 391 undergraduate students and 20 academic staff (13 permanent, 7 temporary) in 2016.

=== Faculty of Engineering ===
The faculty offers undergraduate courses which lead to Bachelor of Science in Engineering (B.Sc.Eng.) degrees.

The faculty is currently divided into five departments:

- Department of Civil Engineering
- Department of Computer Engineering
- Department of Electrical and Electronics Engineering
- Department of Mechanical Engineering
- Department of Inter-disciplinary Studies

The faculty had 142 undergraduate students and 44 academic staff (20 permanent, 24 temporary) in 2016.

=== Faculty of Graduate Studies ===
Deans of the Faculty of Graduate Studies
| Dean | Took office | Left office |
|---|---|---|
| A. Shanmugadas | June 1999 | June 2002 |
| S. K. Sitrampalam | July 2002 | June 2005 |
| K. Kandasamy | July 2005 | June 2008 |
| S. Sathiaseelan | 2008 | 2014 |
| G. Mikunthan | | |

The Faculty of Graduate Studies was established in June 1999.

The faculty offers post graduate courses which lead to Master of Arts, Master of Education, Master of Philosophy and Doctor of Philosophy degrees.

The faculty's current dean and assistant registrar are G. Mikunthan and S. Branavan respectively.

=== Faculty of Hindu Studies ===
The Faculty of Hindu Studies was established on 6 June 2019. Professor S. Srimuralitharan, Senior Lecturer Gr.I, Department of Hindu Civilization, Faculty of Arts, was appointed the first dean of the Faculty of Hindu Studies.

=== Faculty of Management Studies and Commerce ===
Deans of the Faculty of Management Studies and Commerce
| Dean | Took office | Left office |
|---|---|---|
| M. Nadarajasundaram | 29 May 1999 | 30 May 2005 |
| K. Thevarajah | 1 June 2005 | 12 September 2011 |
| T. Velnampy | 15 September 2011 | |

The Faculty of Management Studies and Commerce was established in May 1999 from parts of the Faculty of Arts. Professor M. Nadarajasundaram, Head of the Department of Management Studies, was appointed the first dean of the Faculty of Management Studies and Commerce.

The faculty offers undergraduate courses which lead to Bachelor of Business Administration (B.B.A.), Bachelor of Business Management (B.B.M.) and Bachelor of Commerce (B.Com.) degrees.

Initially the faculty had two departments: Commerce and Management Studies. In 2010 the Department of Commerce was split into four departments: Accounting, Financial Management, Human Resource Management and Marketing. The Department of Commerce was re-established in 2012. The faculty is currently divided into six departments:

- Department of Accounting
- Department of Commerce
- Department of Financial Management
- Department of Human Resource Management
- Department of Management Studies
- Department of Marketing

The faculty's current dean and assistant registrar are T. Velnampy and K. Vijitha respectively. The faculty had 1,406 undergraduate students and 48 academic staff (40 permanent, 8 temporary) in 2016.

=== Faculty of Medicine ===
Deans of the Faculty of Medicine
| Dean | Took office | Left office |
|---|---|---|
| A. A. Hoover | May 1978 | June 1981 |
| R. Kanagasuntheram | July 1981 | December 1983 |
| C. Sivagnanasundram | January 1984 | August 1988 |
| K. Balasubramaniam | August 1988 | July 1994 |
| S. V. Parameswaran | August 1994 | July 1997 |
| R. Rajendraprasad | August 1997 | July 2000 |
| V. Arasaratnam | August 2000 | August 2003 |
| K. Sivapalan | August 2003 | September 2012 |
| S. Balakumar | September 2012 | September 2015 |
| S. Raviraj | September 2015 | September 2021 |
| R. Surenthirakumaran | September 2021 | present |

The Faculty of Medicine was established in August 1978 with its base at the Ayurvedic Hospital in Kaithady. A. A. Hoover, Professor of Biochemistry, was appointed the first dean of the Faculty of Medicine. The faculty was ceremonially opened on 8 October 1978 by Nissanka Wijeyeratne, Minister of Education and Higher Education. The Provincial Hospital at Jaffna was declared the teaching hospital for the faculty. Construction of a new building for the faculty at the Thirunelveli site began in 1979. The faculty left Kaithady and moved into the new building at Thirunelveli in 1981.

The faculty offers undergraduate courses which lead to Bachelor of Medicine, Bachelor of Surgery (M.B.B.S.), Bachelor of Pharmacy (B.Pharm.), Bachelor of Science in Medical Laboratory Sciences and Bachelor of Science in Nursing (B.Sc.N.) degrees.

The faculty is currently divided into twelve departments:

- Department of Anatomy
- Department of Biochemistry
- Department of Community Medicine
- Department of Forensic Medicine
- Department of Medicine
- Department of Obstetrics and Gynaecology
- Department of Paediatrics
- Department of Pathology
- Department of Pharmacology
- Department of Physiology
- Department of Psychiatry
- Department of Surgery

In addition, the Allied Health Sciences Unit offers courses in medical laboratory sciences, nursing, occupational therapy, pharmacy, physiotherapy and radiography.

The faculty's current dean and senior assistant registrar are S. Raviraj and A. R. Ramesh. The faculty had 882 undergraduate students and 59 academic staff (54 permanent, 5 temporary) in 2016.

=== Faculty of Science ===
Deans of the Faculty of Science
| Dean | Took office | Left office |
|---|---|---|
| P. Kanagasabapathy | October 1974 | January 1977 |
| K. Kunaratnam | January 1977 | May 1978 |
| V. Tharmaratnam | June 1978 | December 1984 |
| K. Kunaratnam | January 1985 | March 1988 |
| V. K. Ganesalingam | April 1988 | February 1991 |
| S. Mageswaran | March 1991 | October 1996 |
| V. K. Ganesalingam | November 1996 | November 1999 |
| R. Kumaravadivel | November 1999 | July 2010 |
| K. Kandasamy | July 2010 | July 2013 |
| S. Srisatkunarajah | July 2013 | July 2016 |
| R. Vigneswaran | July 2016 | April 2017 |
| J. P. Jeyadevan | May 2017 | May 2020 |
| P. Ravirajan | June 2020 | present |

The Jaffna Campus of the University of Sri Lanka started functioning in October 1974 with two faculties: Faculty of Humanities and Faculty of Science. The Faculty of Science was based at Jaffna College in Vaddukoddai. P. Kanagasabapathy, Head of the Department of Mathematics at the Peradeniya Campus of the University of Sri Lanka, was appointed the first dean of the Faculty of Science. The faculty initially had only one department: Mathematics and Statistics.

The Department of Chemistry and Department of Physics were started in April 1975.

The facilities at Jaffna College proved to be inadequate and construction of a new building for the faculty at the Thirunelveli site began in 1975. The faculty left Jaffna College and moved into the Natural Science Block at Thirunelveli in June 1978.

Three Physics Block was completed in September 1980, Mathematics and Statistics Block in 1985 and Chemistry Block in 1988. The Department of Computer Science was started in 1991. The Department of Fisheries was added in June 2009. The Natural Science Block (Stage II) was opened for academic activities in 2013. The foundation for the building to the Department of Computer Science was laid on June 27, 2019 with the World Bank-funded AHEAD operations. The construction of the building is completed in 2022.

The faculty offers bachelor's honours degree of four-year duration (one type of which is traditionally referred to as the Special degree) in addition to the Bachelor’s degree of three-year duration (traditionally referred to as the General degree). Selection to bachelor's honours degree courses is made at the end of the second year (Level 2) of study in the case of subject-specific fonours degree traditionally known as the Special Degree and at the end of the third year (Level 3) of study in the case of the extended degree programme in Applied Science. Selection is generally based on the availability of the places and on the performance of the students in their examinations.

The Faculty of Science consists of seven departments namely:

- Department of Botany
- Department of Chemistry
- Department of Computer Science
- Department of Fisheries
- Department of Mathematics and Statistics
- Department of Physics
- Department of Zoology

The faculty's current dean and assistant registrar are Prof P. Ravirajan and Mrs S. Gowsala. The annual intake of students to the faculty had increased to 500 over the years and it was about 250 in the mid-eighties. Since 2009, the faculty is flourished with the intake of students from all parts of the Island representing all ethnicity which added a conducive multicultural environment in the faculty to foster and promote social harmony. Under the president’s scholarship scheme, a few international students have also been admitted to the faculty since 2016. The Faculty of Science consists of seven departments namely, Departments of Botany, Chemistry, Computer Science, Fisheries, Physics, Mathematics and Statistics, and Zoology. The faculty receives the services of 95 academic staff, 59 academic-support staff and 80 non-academic staff. More than 95% of the permanent academic staff possess postgraduate qualifications, of which nearly two-thirds are PhD holders.

=== Faculty of Technology ===
Deans of the Faculty of Technology
| Dean | Took office | Left office |
|---|---|---|
| K. Kanthasamy | 2016 | |
| S. Srisatkunarajah | | |

The Faculty of Technology was established in 2016. The faculty is expected to admit its first students towards the end of 2016. It will be located near the Faculty of Agriculture and Faculty of Engineering in Kilinochchi.

The faculty offers courses in engineering technology and bio technology.

The faculty is currently divided into three departments:

- Department of Bio Systems Technology
- Department of Engineering Technology
- Department of Inter Disciplinary Studies

The faculty's current dean is S. Srisatkunarajah.

=== Faculty of Technological Studies ===
Deans of the Faculty of Technological Studies
| Dean | Took office | Left office |
|---|---|---|
| S. S. Suthaharan | July 2020 | |

The Faculty of Technological Studies was recently established as a third Faculty in the Vavuniya Campus of the University of Jaffna in January 2020.

The faculty offers undergraduate courses which lead to Bachelor of Information Communication Technology Honours (BICT Hons.) degree.

The faculty is currently consisting of one department:

- Department of Information and Communication Technology

The faculty's current dean is S.S.Suthaharan. The faculty had 343 undergraduate students and 12 academic staff (6 permanent, 6 temporary) in 2019.
