= University of Sri Lanka =

Public university system of Sri Lanka from 1972 to 1978

- ශ්‍රී ලංකා විශ්වවිද්‍යාලය இலங்கைப் பல்கலைக்கழகம்
- Motto: Sanskrit: Sarvasya locanam śāstram
- Motto in English: Knowledge is the eye unto all.
- Type: Public
- Active: 15 February 1972–31 December 1978
- Location: Sri Lanka
- Campus: Multiple campuses

The University of Sri Lanka (Sinhala: ශ්‍රී ලංකා විශ්වවිද්‍යාලය, Tamil: இலங்கைப் பல்கலைக்கழகம்) was the public university system of Sri Lanka from 1972 to 1978. The university system was dissolved in 1978 and its six campuses turned into independent universities: the University of Peradeniya, the University of Colombo, the University of Sri Jayewardenepura, the University of Kelaniya, the University of Moratuwa, and the University of Jaffna.

Established in 1972 by amalgamating the four existing universities, the University of Sri Lanka was the only university in Sri Lanka from 1972 until 1978. The university system consisted of six campuses at Colombo, Peradeniya, Sri Jayewardenepura, Kelaniya, Moratuwa, and Jaffna.

== History ==
The Ceylon University Ordinance No. 20 of 1942 established Sri Lanka's first fully fledged degree granting university, the University of Ceylon, on 1 July 1942 by amalgamating Ceylon University College and Ceylon Medical College. The university was initially based at the Ceylon University College site in Colombo whilst a new campus was built at Peradeniya. Various faculties and departments moved from Colombo to Peradeniya from 1949 onwards. The university's administration moved to Peradeniya in 1952 and the university officially became the University of Ceylon, Peradeniya on 6 October 1952. Sections of the university continued to be based at the Colombo campus of the university.

The Vidyodaya University and Vidyalankara University Act No. 45 of 1958 elevated Vidyodaya Pirivena at Maligakanda and the Vidyalankara Pirivena at Kelaniya into two separate universities. Vidyodaya University and Vidyalankara University opened in 1959.

By the mid-1960s there were calls for the creation of a separate, independent university based at the Colombo campus. The Ceylon University Ordinance No. 20 of 1942 was replaced by Higher Education Act No. 20 of 1966. At the 1967 Throne Speech it was announced that a new university was to be established in Colombo. Under the provisions of the Higher Education Act the University of Ceylon, Colombo was established with effect from 1 October 1967.

The University of Ceylon Act No. 1 of 1972 amalgamated the four universities - University of Ceylon, Peradeniya, University of Ceylon, Colombo, Vidyodyaya University and Vidyalankara University - into a single university, the University of Sri Lanka, with four campuses. At the same time the Ceylon College of Technology at Katubedda became the fifth campus of the university. Jaffna became the sixth campus of the university on 25 July 1974.

The Universities Act No. 16 of 1978 radically altered university education in Sri Lanka. The University of Sri Lanka was abolished and its six campuses were each elevated to independent, autonomous universities in their own right: University of Peradeniya, University of Colombo, University of Sri Jayewardenepura (Vidyodaya), University of Kelaniya (Vidyalankara), University of Moratuwa (Katubedda) and University of Jaffna.

== List of vice-chancellors ==
- B. A. Abeywickrema (1972–1974)
- L. H. Sumanadasa (1974)
- P. P. G. L. Siriwardena (1974–1978)
