= List of Ceylon University College people =

The following is a list of notable people associated with the Ceylon University College (also known as University College, Ceylon; University College, Colombo; and Colombo University College) (1921–42).

== Presidents ==
- 1921–25 William Manning
- 1925–27 Hugh Clifford
- 1928–31 Herbert Stanley
- 1931–33 Graeme Thomson
- 1933–37 Reginald Edward Stubbs
- 1937–42 Andrew Caldecott

== Principals ==
- 1921 Edwin Evans
- 1921–40 Robert Marrs
- 1940–42 Ivor Jennings

== Academics ==
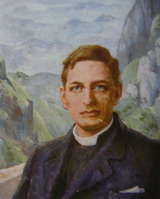
W. S. Senior

- Nigel Ball – professor of botany
- David Raitt Robertson Burt - lecturer in zoology, 1924–39; professor of zoology, 1939-42
- K. Kanapathypillai – lecturer in Tamil
- E. F. C. Ludowyk – professor of English
- A. W. Mailvaganam – lecturer in physics
- Gunapala Piyasena Malalasekera – lecturer in Sanskrit, Pali and Sinhala
- W. S. Senior – lecturer in classics
- C. Suntharalingam – chair of mathematics

== Alumni ==
=== Academia ===
- V. Appapillai – lecturer in physics, dean of the Faculty of Science at the University of Ceylon, Peradeniya
- K. S. Arulnandhy – lecturer in education
- J. T. Arulanantham – Principal of St. John's College, Jaffna
- A. M. A. Azeez – Principal of Zahira College, Colombo
- C. J. Eliezer – professor of mathematics
- H. A. I. Goonetileke – assistant librarian
- Don Carlin Gunawardena – professor of Botany; Head of the Department of Science at Vidyodaya University, Ceylon
- K. Kanapathypillai – professor of Tamil; head of the Department of Tamil at the University of Ceylon
- E. F. C. Ludowyk – professor of English
- A. W. Mailvaganam – professor of physics; dean of the Faculty of Science at the University of Ceylon
- T. Nadaraja – professor of law; chancellor of the University of Jaffna
- E. O. E. Pereira – professor of civil engineering; vice-chancellor of the University of Ceylon
- Ediriweera Sarachchandra – lecturer in Pali
- V. Veerasingam – Principal of Manipay Hindu College; Member of Parliament for Vaddukoddai

=== Arts ===
- Regi Siriwardena – writer

=== Civil service ===
- K. Alvapillai – permanent secretary
- C. Balasingham – permanent secretary at the Ministry of Health
- C.A. Coorey – permanent secretary at the Ministry Finance and Treasury
- H.C. Goonewardene – permanent secretary at the Ministry of Home Affairs
- Bogoda Premaratne - educator, civil servant
- M. Rajendra – permanent secretary, government agent
- M. Srikantha – permanent secretary, government agent
- S. J. Walpita – permanent secretary at the Ministry of Industries and Fisheries; vice-chancellor of the University of Ceylon, Peradeniya

=== Government and politics ===
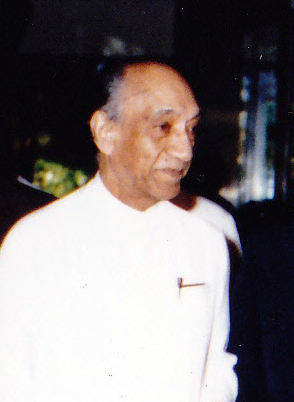
J. R. Jayewardene

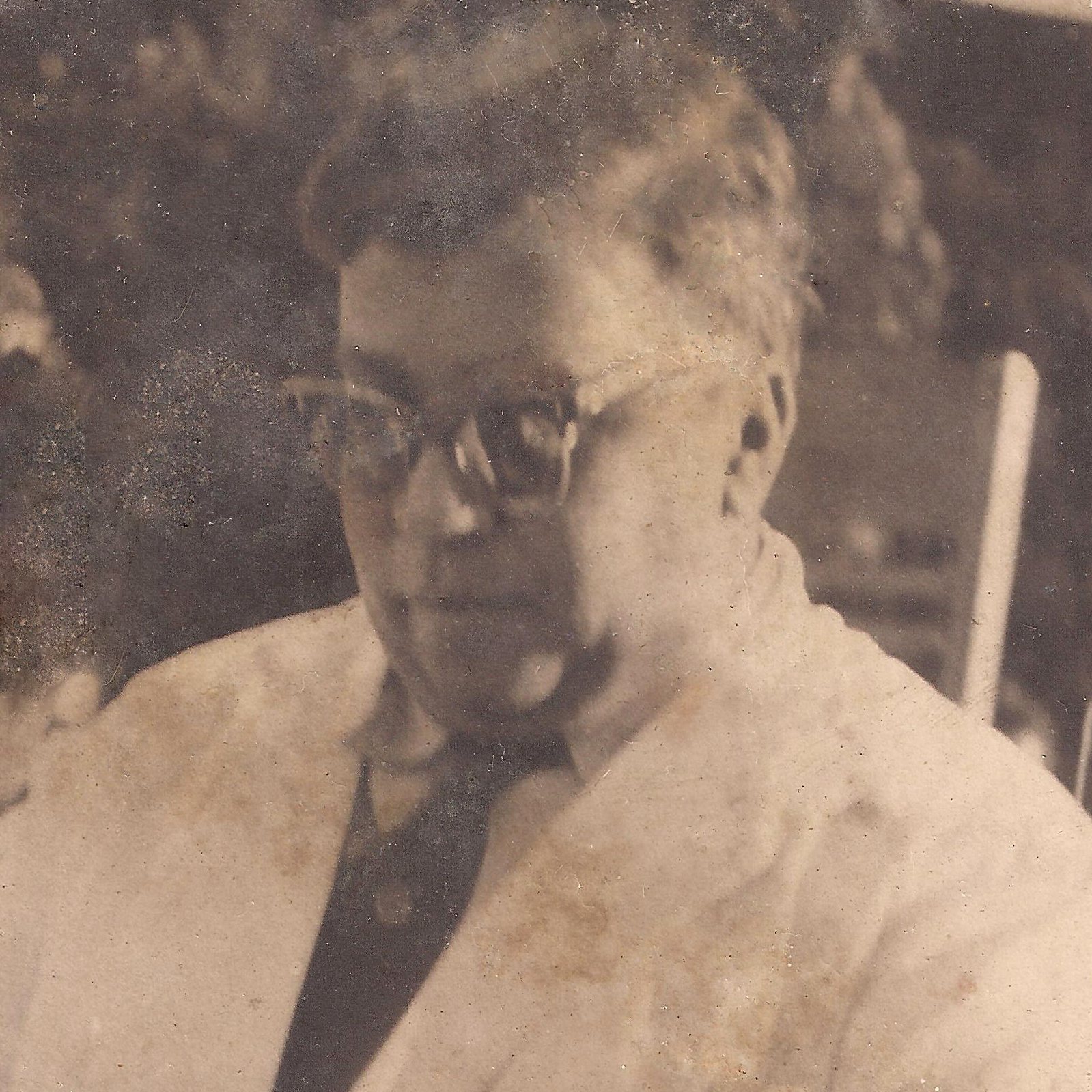
E. L. Senanayake

- Hector Abhayavardhana – politician
- A. Amirthalingam – Leader of the Opposition
- M. Balasundaram – Member of Parliament for Kopay
- Colvin R. de Silva – government minister
- C. P. de Silva – government minister
- Walwin de Silva – Member of Parliament for Ambalangoda–Balapitiya; vice-chancellor of the University of Ceylon, Colombo
- William de Silva – government minister
- Doric de Souza – Senator; associated professor of English; permanent secretary at the Ministry of Plantation Industries and Constitutional Affairs
- J. R. Jayewardene – President
- P. Kandiah – Member of Parliament for Point Pedro
- V. A. Kandiah – Member of Parliament for Kayts
- Anil Moonesinghe – government minister
- K. V. Nadarajah – Member of Parliament for Bandarawela
- N. M. Perera – government minister
- N. R. Rajavarothiam – Member of Parliament for Trincomalee
- T. Ramalingam – Member of Parliament for Point Pedro
- E. L. Senanayake – Speaker of the Parliament
- M. Sivasithamparam – Deputy Speaker
- M. Tiruchelvam – government minister
- C. Vanniasingam – Member of Parliament for Kopay

=== Law ===
- Oswald Leslie De Kretser III – Supreme Court judge
- T. B. Dissanayake – lawyer
- S. R. Kanaganayagam – lawyer, senator
- S. Nadesan – lawyer, senator
- K. Palakidnar – President of the Court of Appeal
- Bernard Peiris – lawyer, cabinet secretary
- P. Sriskandarajah – Supreme Court judge
- H. W. Thambiah – Supreme Court judge
- Victor Tennekoon – Chief Justice
- Vincent Thamotheram – Supreme Court judge

=== Military ===
- Anton Muttukumaru – Commander of the Army

=== Religion ===
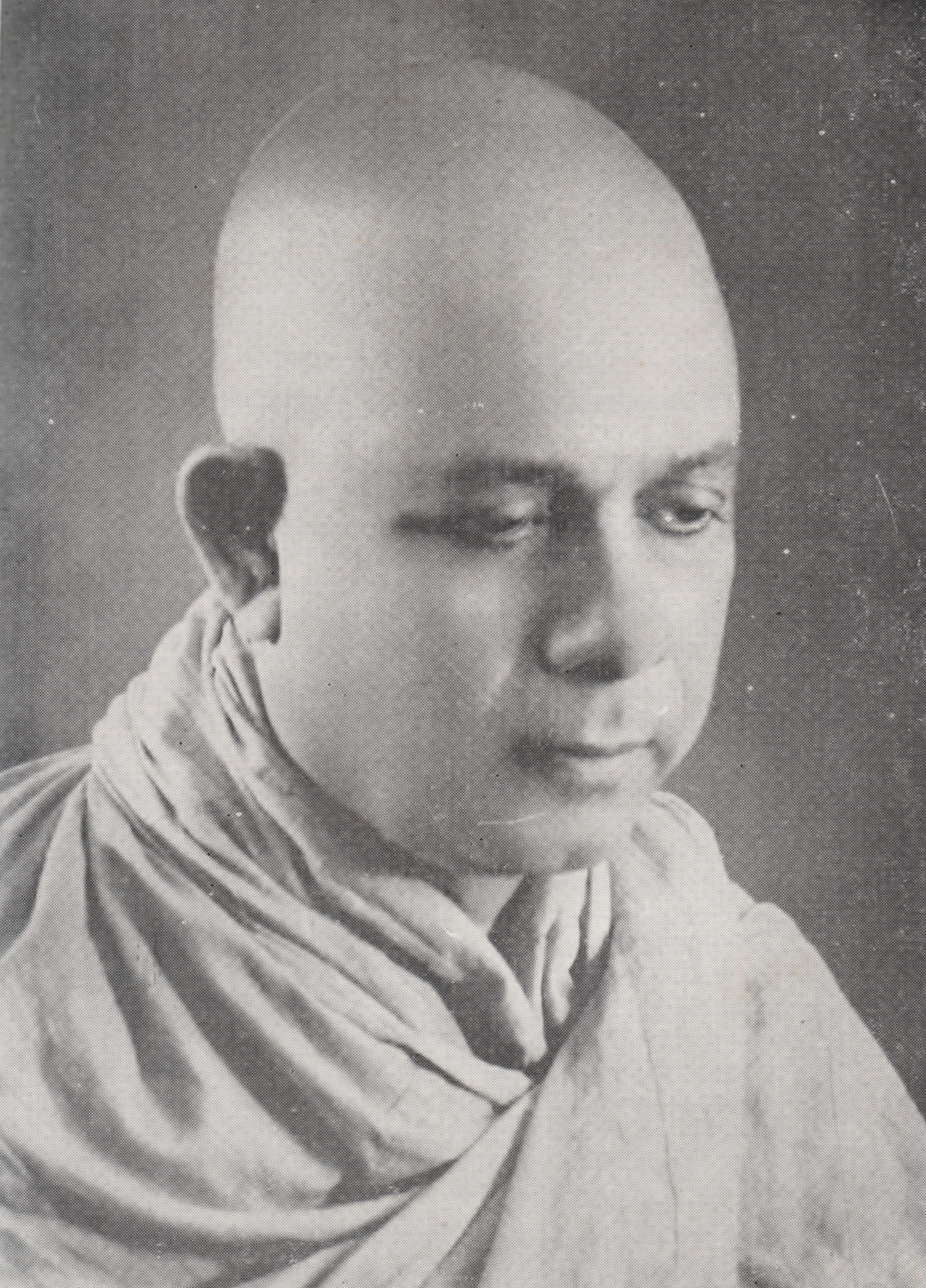
Narada Maha Thera

- Cyril Abeynaike – Anglican Bishop of Colombo
- Thomas Cooray – Roman Catholic Archbishop of Colombo
- Bastiampillai Deogupillai – Roman Catholic Bishop of Jaffna
- Narada Maha Thera – Superior of Vajirarama Temple

=== Other ===
- S. C. C. Anthony Pillai – trade unionist and Member of Parliament.
- S. Arumugam – irrigation engineer
- Sydney de Zoysa – Deputy Inspector General of Police, permanent secretary at the Ministry of Internal Security
- B. D. Rampala – general manager of Sri Lanka Railways
- L. H. Sumanadasa – engineer, vice-chancellor of the University of Sri Lanka
- C. J. T. Thamotheram – teacher, publisher and social worker.
