= List of Sri Lankans by educational institution =

The following is a list of Sri Lankans by educational institutions in Sri Lanka and around the world.

== Secondary education ==
=== A ===
- List of Ananda College alumni

=== D ===
- List of Dharmapala Vidyalaya alumni
- List of Dharmaraja College alumni

=== J ===
- List of Jaffna Hindu College people

=== M ===
- List of Mahinda College alumni
- List of Maliyadeva College alumni

=== N ===
- List of Nalanda College Colombo alumni

=== R ===
- List of Royal College Colombo alumni

=== S ===
- List of St. Anthony’s College, Kandy alumni
- List of St Peter's College, Colombo alumni
- List of St. Thomas' College alumni

=== T ===
- List of Trinity College, Kandy alumni

=== Z ===
- List of Zahira College, Colombo alumni

== Tertiary education ==
=== C ===
- List of Ceylon University College people
- List of University of Ceylon people
- List of University of Colombo people

=== E ===
- List of Eastern University of Sri Lanka people

=== J ===
- List of University of Jaffna people

=== K ===
- List of University of Kelaniya people

=== M ===
- List of University of Moratuwa people

=== P ===
- List of University of Peradeniya people
