= D. T. Niles =

Sri Lankan pastor and theologian

Reverend D. T. Niles
- Born: 4 May 1908; Tellippalai, Ceylon
- Died: 17 July 1970 (aged 62)
- Education: Jaffna Central College; United Theological College, Bangalore
- Occupation: Pastor/Theologian

Daniel Thambyrajah Niles (4 May 1908 – 17 July 1970) was a Sri Lankan pastor, theologian, ecclesiologist, evangelist and president of the Ceylon Methodist Conference.

== Early life and family ==
Niles was born on 4 May 1908 in Tellippalai in northern Ceylon. He was the son of district judge W. D. Niles and Rani Muthamma. He was educated at Jaffna Central College. After school he received theological training at United Theological College, Bangalore between 1920 and 1933.

Mailvaganam married Dulcie Solomons in 1935. They had two sons (Preman and Wesley Dayalan).

== Career ==
Germanos & D. T. Niles (1948)

After returning to Ceylon, Niles taught at Jaffna Central College until 1936. He was then ordained as a priest and became District Evangelist for the North District of the Methodist Church of Ceylon.

Niles became general secretary of the National Christian Council of Ceylon. He was chairman of the Youth Department of the World Council of Churches between 1948 and 1952. He was appointed Executive Secretary of the Department of Evangelism in the World Council of Churches in 1953. He also served as chairman of the World Student Christian Federation. He was general secretary and later chairman of the East Asian Christian Conference. He was also one of the presidents of the World Council of Churches.

Niles was pastor of the Methodist Church in Point Pedro (1946–50); pastor at Maradana (1950–53); principal of Jaffna Central College (1956–62); and superintendent minister at St. Peter's Church, Jaffna (1953–59). He was elected chairman of the North Ceylon Synod and president of the Ceylon Methodist Conference in 1964. Niles wrote the hymn "The Great love of God is revealed in the Son".

Niles was also known as an author of many theological books such as:

- That They May Have Life (1951) - This book is the source of Niles' most famous quote: "Evangelism is witness. It is one beggar telling another beggar where to get food." His statement is sometimes mis-quoted by substituting "bread" for "food."
- Preaching the Gospel of the Resurrection (1953)
- Reading the Bible To-Day (1955)
- Living With the Gospel (1957)
- The Preacher’s Task and the Stone of Stumbling (1958)
- In the Beginning – Biblical Essays Based on the Book of Genesis (1958)
- The Preacher’s Calling to be Servant (1959)
- As Seeing the Invisible – A Study of the Book of Revelation (1961)
- Upon the Earth: The Mission of God and Missionary Enterprise of the Churches (1962)
- We Know in Part (1964)
- Whereof We are Witnesses (1965)
- The Power at Work Among Us – Meditations For Lent (1967)
- Who is This Jesus (1968)
- What’s Life For: That They May See (1968)

== Death ==
Niles died on 17 July 1970.
