= The Colombo Philharmonic Choir =

Sri Lankan classical choir

- Choir
- Origin: Merger of the Maradana and Kollupitiya Methodist church choirs
- Founded: August 1955; 70 years ago
- Founder: Prof. Gerald Cooray
- Genre: Classical music
- President: Sharmini Wikramanayake
- Chief conductor: Harin Amirthanathan
- Headquarters: Colombo, Sri Lanka

The Colombo Philharmonic Choir is the oldest active Sri Lankan classical choir, and is based in Colombo. The choir consists of between 35 and 45 committed singers at any given time.

== History ==
The Colombo Philharmonic traces its origins to the merger of two church choirs- those of the Maradana and Kollupitiya Methodist Churches. Formed under the baton of the renowned geologist Prof. Gerald Cooray, with Ralph Vaughan Williams Esq.,O.M.,Mus.Doc as patron, the choir- made up mostly of members of this Maradana- Kollupitiya Choral Society - premiered in August 1955, with a performance, ‘Carols’ during the Christmas season, at the main hall of Royal College, Colombo 7. The first committee consisted of O.B. Forbes (President), Dulcie Nelson (Secretary) and Paul Siva Prakasam (Choir Secretary). Benjamin Britten O.M.C.H. and Cooray have served as patrons of the choir.

Paul M. Jayarajan conducted the choir for two years from 1973 and in 1975 passed the baton to Kalasuri Lylie Godridge. Known as Sri Lanka's ‘Singing Ambassador’ and one of the country's leading baritones, he also introduced the choir to Eastern music, integrating traditional Eastern music with classical Western music.

During his tenure as conductor, Lylie Godridge was supported in his efforts by Russel Bartholomeusz, the choir's most long-standing accompanist. The choir was led by Lylie until his death at the age of 70 in 1998.

It was at this time that Mary Anne David née Roberts, a singing member of the choir, a committee member in 1973 and the president of the choir in 1987, took over as its first female conductor, leading the choir for more than six years. The founder and director of the Merry An Singers, she encouraged several new members to join.

The choir was later taken over by its then assistant conductor- Mr. Manilal Weerakoon - a product of St. Thomas’ College Mount Lavinia, who served as a conductor of the Symphony Orchestra of Sri Lanka (SOSL) as well as a member of the Interlude Singers. Mr. Weerakoon led the choir for almost 15 years. The 50th anniversary celebrations of the choir took place under his leadership in 2005 as well as the Diamond Jubilee celebrations 10 years later in 2015.

The choir was subsequently taken over by its present conductor Mr. Harin Amirthanathan who himself was a former chorister of the choir. His inaugural concert took place in November 2018 at The Church of St. Michael and All Angels, Polwatte. Since then the choir has performed many programmes including a performance of Karl Jenkins – ‘The Armed Man’ in March 2023.

== Notable performances ==
The year 1956 saw the choir perform Bach's ‘St. Matthew’s Passion’ to an audience that filled St. Michael's Church . As Cooray recalls in his autobiography “Reminiscences of a Choral Conductor” that appeared in the Saturday Magazine of the Island newspaper in 2001, the choir had Peter Pears and Benjamin Britten perform with them on this occasion.

The next few years saw many successful concerts for the choir. The Mozart Bicentenary (1956) where the choir performed his ‘C minor mass’, The Vaughan Williams’ 85th birthday concert (1957) and the performance of the ‘Nelson mass’ by Haydn together with the then Symphony Orchestra of Ceylon (SEC) are some notable examples.

James Gaddarn, the examiner for the Trinity College of Music one year, congratulated the choir on its performance of Arthur Bliss’ ‘Pastoral’ at a concert featuring both this work and Handel's ‘Acis and Galatea’ saying that he “could never get his English choirs to enunciate the English words as The Colombo Philharmonic Choir did!”

In October 1963 the Choir, joined by the Catholic Choral Society, and the then Symphony Orchestra of Ceylon led by Eileen Prins performed at a concert celebrating the 150th birth anniversary of Verdi.

In 1966 the Choir saw the departure of its conductor Gerald Cooray, performing some excerpts from ‘The Messiah’.

Lylie Godridge made his debut conducting the choir in Handel's opera ‘Acis and Galatea’. Subsequent performances included ‘An Evening of French music’ featuring many French composers works (1980), ‘The Soul of affection’ (1992), ‘Songs of Stephen Foster’ (1993) and many ‘Evenings of song’. He conducted the Choir as it celebrated 40 years in 1995 at the Lionel Wendt Theatre, together with the LG Singers and the LG Chorus. Performances that year included ‘Schubertiad’- the birth bicentenary concert of Franz Schubert (1996) and ‘A commemoration concert’ celebrating Donizetti, Mendelssohn and Brahms.

The 50th Anniversary of the choir was marked by three concerts: a programme of sacred music at Ladies College - featuring Schubert's ‘Mass in G’; a concert held in celebration and thanksgiving for all past members at Lionel Wendt; and a Christmas concert. The Diamond Jubilee in 2015 was celebrated with a concert sponsored by the German Embassy in Sri Lanka at St. Andrew's Scots Kirk, Colombo performing old classics to a packed audience.

== Present status ==
The Choir consistently performs at least twice a year, with the Christmas concert being an annual tradition, usually held in late November.

The Colombo Philharmonic Choir meets every Monday during the season from 6.30 – 8.30 p.m.
