= Ananthi Sasitharan =

Sri Lankan politician

Honourable Ananthi Sasitharan MPC
- அனந்தி சசிதரன்

Minister of Women's Affairs, Rehabilitation, Social Service, Co-operatives, Food Supply and Distribution, Industries and Enterprise Promotion and Trade and Commerce, Northern Province (Note: Minister of Women's Affairs, Rehabilitation, Social Services, Co-operatives, Food Supply and Distribution, Industries and Enterprise Promotion (June 2017 – August 2017))
- Incumbent
- Assumed office 29 June 2017
- Preceded by: C. V. Vigneswaran

Member of the Northern Provincial Council for Jaffna District
- Incumbent
- Assumed office 11 October 2013

Personal details
- Born: 10 September 1971 (age 54)
- Party: Illankai Tamil Arasu Kachchi
- Other political affiliations: Tamil National Alliance
- Occupation: Management Assistant
- Ethnicity: Sri Lankan Tamil

Ananthi Sasitharan (Tamil: அனந்தி சசிதரன், romanized: Aṉanti Cacitaraṉ; born 10 September 1971 ) is a Sri Lankan Tamil activist, politician and provincial minister. She is the wife of Velayutham Sasitharan (alias Elilan), the rebel Liberation Tigers of Tamil Eelam's political head for Trincomalee.

== Early life and family ==
Ananthi was born on 10 September 1971. Her parents were from Kankesanthurai and Chulipuram in northern Ceylon. Ananthi's sister Vasanthi was a member of the Eelam People's Revolutionary Liberation Front and was killed by the Liberation Tigers of Tamil Eelam (LTTE) in 1989. Her younger brother went missing whilst fighting for the LTTE.

Ananthi was educated at Victoria College, Chulipuram. Whilst at school she met Velayutham Sasitharan (alias Elilan) who was active in the political wing of the rebel LTTE. Ananthi fell in love with Elilan but Elilan told her to concentrate on her studies.

== Life with the LTTE ==
After school Ananthi studied accountancy but gave this up in 1992 after getting a job at the Jaffna District Secretariat. She worked for Valikamam West Divisional Secretariat between 1993 and 1996. After the Sri Lankan military re-captured the Valikamam region in 1996 Elilan and the LTTE re-located to the Vanni. Ananthi followed them and worked as a clerk for the Mullaitivu District Secretariat between 1997 and 2003. She worked as a management assistant at Kilinochchi District Secretariat from 2003 to 2013.

Ananthi and Elilan were eventually married, on 6 June 1998 at Mulliyawalai. Elilan rose up the ranks with the LTTE and was appointed political head for Vavuniya District. After the 2002 Norwegian mediated peace he was appointed political head for Trincomalee District. After the Sri Lankan military re-captured the Eastern Province Elilan re-located to the Vanni and worked at the Kilinochchi District Secretariat alongside his wife.

The Sasitharan family were amongst 300,000+ people from the Vanni who fled as the Sri Lankan military advanced in late 2008/early 2009. According to Ananthi the family, along with senior LTTE leaders, surrendered to the Sri Lankan military on 18 May 2009 at Vattavaagal. Elilan disappeared after surrendering to the Sri Lankan military.

Ananthi and her three daughters ended up in the IDP camps before she resumed her work as a Management Assistant in the Samurdhi Department of the Kilinochchi District Secretariat. Her children were sent to live with her family in Chulipuram.

== Activist life ==
Ananthi, who believes that her husband Elilan is in the custody of the Sri Lankan government, has been campaigning to find him and get him released. She has also campaigned on behalf of families of others who disappeared during the civil war and war widows. She has met with United Nations High Commissioner for Human Rights Navi Pillay and United States Ambassador-at-Large for War Crimes Issues Stephen Rapp during their visits to Sri Lanka.

Ananthi contested the 2013 provincial council election as one of the Tamil National Alliance's candidates in Jaffna District and was elected to the Northern Provincial Council. During the election campaign she was the target of several attacks. On 20 September 2013 a vehicle carrying Ananthi was attacked by men on a motorbike near Chunnakam. On 20 September 2013 a group of around 70 armed men in military uniform attacked Sasitharan's home in Chulipuram, injuring some of her supporters and an election monitor. On 21 September 2013, the day of the election, a fake edition of the pro-TNA newspaper Uthayan appeared, falsely claiming that Ananthi had defected to the governing United People's Freedom Alliance. This false story was repeated in pro-UPFA Dan TV and Asian Tribune website.

After the election Ananthi was appointed to assist the Chief Minister on the rehabilitation of war victims. She took her oath as provincial councillor in front of Chief Minister C. V. Vigneswaran at Veerasingam Hall on 11 October 2013.

After being elected Ananthi has taken her campaign abroad to Denmark, Germany, Norway, Switzerland and the USA. In January 2014 the nationalist Island newspaper reported that the Sri Lankan military was considering sending Ananthi for "rehabilitation", a move that Ananthi has stated she would defy.

Ananthi was sworn in as Minister of Women's Affairs, Rehabilitation, Social Services, Co-operatives, Food Supply and Distribution, Industries and Enterprise Promotion in front of Governor Reginald Cooray on 29 June 2017. She was given the additional portfolio of Trade and Commerce on 23 August 2017.
