= Cyril Aldred =

English Egyptologist, art historian, and author

Cyril Aldred FRSE FSA Scot
- Cyril Aldred in 1969
- Born: 19 February 1914; Fulham, London, England
- Died: 23 June 1991 (aged 77); Edinburgh, Scotland
- Education: King's College London; Courtauld Institute of Art (1936)
- Occupations: Egyptologist, art historian
- Spouse: Jessie Kennedy Morton (m. 1938)

Cyril Aldred FRSE FSA Scot (19 February 1914 – 23 June 1991) was an English Egyptologist, art historian, and author.

== Early life ==
Cyril Aldred was born in Fulham, London, the son of Frederick Aldred and Lilian Ethel Underwood, and the sixth of seven children.

Aldred attended Sloane School, in Chelsea, and studied English at King's College London, and then art history at the Courtauld Institute of Art. While a student, he met Howard Carter, the archaeologist who discovered the intact tomb of Tutankhamen. Carter invited Aldred to work with him in Egypt, but Aldred instead pursued a university education. He graduated from the Courtauld Institute in 1936.

== Career ==
In 1937, he became an assistant curator at the Royal Scottish Museum, in Edinburgh, where he worked for the remainder of his professional life, rising to become Keeper of Art & Archaeology (1961–74). Aldred was appointed the Hon. Editor of the Scottish Anthropological and Folklore Society's Proceedings in 1938. He edited Volumes 3.1, 3.2, 3.3 and 4.1 of the journal, from 1938 until 1949.

During World War II, Aldred served in the Royal Air Force, returning to Edinburgh in 1946, to undertake a serious study of Egyptology.

In 1949, Aldred's book Old Kingdom Art in Ancient Egypt was published and was followed by volumes on the Middle and New Kingdoms in 1950 and 1952. These publications established his career as an Egyptologist and art historian. He also contributed essays on Egyptian furniture and woodwork as a part of the Oxford History of Technology in 1954 and 1956. In 1955, he worked as an associate curator for a year in the department of Egyptian art in the Metropolitan Museum of Art, New York, alongside curator William C. Hayes. During his time at the Met, Aldred used his artistic eye to dramatically improve the presentation of the exhibitions and helped identify and catalogue a number of previously overlooked artifacts in storage. In 1956, Aldred returned to the Royal Scottish Museum to enhance the Egyptology team and in 1961 he was promoted to keeper of art and archaeology, a post which he held until his retirement. During his time at the RSM, he not only gave lectures but also made significant purchases and helped the museum vastly improve not only the Egyptology displays but also the West African and South Sea's sections.

Aldred's book Akhenaten, Pharaoh of Egypt – a new study, was published in 1968. He had a keen interest in jewellery from ancient Egypt and his Jewels of the Pharaohs appeared in 1971, published by Thames and Hudson. This was a major contribution to the field. His most significant art-historical writing of the period, however, was the catalogue he wrote for the Brooklyn Museum exhibition, "Akhenaten and Nefertiti" in 1973.

Aldred retired in 1974, but his writing continued. In 1978 he was elected a Fellow of the Royal Society of Edinburgh. His proposers were John Cameron, Lord Cameron, Norman Tebble, Sir Norman Graham and Stuart Piggott.

Beginning in 1978, Aldred wrote studies for the French "L'univers des formes" surveys of Egyptian art (other volumes appearing in 1979 and 1980). In 1980, Aldred published Egyptian Art, although another intended book on Egyptian sculpture was never published. The Times Educational Supplement wrote of Egyptian Art, "His eloquent ability to weave facts, insights and interpretations into a compulsively readable account sets his book far above the clogged texts that too often pass for art history".

In 1988, he enlarged his 1968 text in Akhenaten, King of Egypt with later findings.

He died peacefully at his home in Edinburgh in 1991, and is remembered as one of the leading characters in improving archaeology in Scotland at the Burrell Collection in Glasgow.

=== Personal life ===
Aldred married Jessie Kennedy Morton (b. 1909), a physiotherapist, in 1938.

== Bibliography ==
- [collected articles] Ancient Egypt in the Metropolitan Museum Journal, Volumes 1–11 (1968–1976): Articles. [by Cyril Aldred].
- New York: Metropolitan Museum of Art, 1977; "The Development of Ancient Egyptian Art: from 3200 to 1315 B. C." 3 vols. London : A. Tiranti, 1952;
- New Kingdom Art in Ancient Egypt During the Eighteenth Dynasty, 1590 to 1315 B. C. Published: London, A. Tiranti, 1951;
- Akhenaten and Nefertiti. New York: Brooklyn Museum/Viking Press, 1973;
- Akhenaten, Pharaoh of Egypt: a New Study. London: Thames & Hudson, 1968;
- Egypt to the End of the Old Kingdom. London: Thames and Hudson, 1965;
- Jewels of the Pharaohs: Egyptian Jewellery of the Dynastic Period. London: Thames and Hudson, 1971;
- Egyptian Art, 'World of Art' series. London: Thames and Hudson, 1980;
- Middle Kingdom Art in Ancient Egypt, 2300-1590 B.C. London: A. Tiranti, 1950;
- Old kingdom Art in Ancient Egypt. London: A. Tiranti, 1949;
- The Egyptians. London: Thames and Hudson, 1961;
- "The Pharaoh Akhenaten: a Problem in Egyptology and Pathology." Bulletin of the History of Medicine 36, no. 4 (July–August 1962): 293–316;
- L'Univers des Formes [series]:
- The Temple of Dendur 1978, Metropolitan Museum of Art, New York (with a PDF download link)
  - Le Temps des pyramides: de la préhistoire aux Hyksos, 1560 av. J.-C. Paris: Gallimard, 1978
  - L'Empire des conquérants: l'Égypte au Nouvel Empire (1560–1070). Paris: Gallimard, 1979
  - L'Égypte du crépuscule: de Tanis à Méroé, 1070 av. J.-C.-IVe siècle apr. J.-C. Paris: Gallimard, 1980 (with François Daumas; Christiane Desroches-Noblecourt; Jean Leclant).

== See also ==
- List of Egyptologists

== Sources ==
- James, Thomas Garnet H. "Cyril Aldred." Journal of Egyptian Archaeology 78 (1992): 258–66;
- Waterston, Charles D. "Cyril Aldred." Year Book of the Royal Society of Edinburgh (1990–91): 32–4;
- Goring, Elizabeth, and Reeves, Nicholas and Ruffle, John, eds. "Chief of Seers: Egyptian Studies in Memory of Cyril Aldred". New York: Kegan Paul International, 1997;
- The Independent 6 July 1991;
- The Times (London) 6 July 1991;
- James, Thomas Garnet H. "Aldred, Cyril (1914–1991)." Oxford Dictionary of National Biography, Oxford University Press, 2004.
- Reeves, Nicholas, "Englishman in New York: Cyril Aldred at the Met, 1955–1956" in Jacobus van Dijk, "Another Mouthful of Dust. Egyptological Studies in Honour of Geoffrey Thorndike Martin". Peeters, Leuven, Paris, Bristol CT, 2016, pp. 435–460.
