= K. Puvanendran =

Sri Lankan–born neurologist (born 1937)

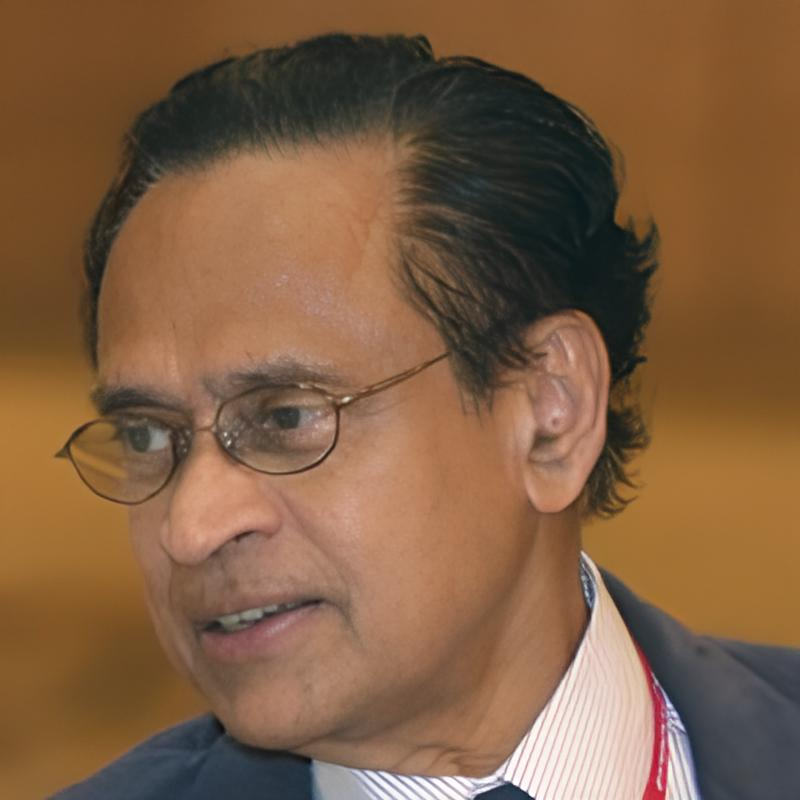
- K. Puvanendran
- Born: 1937 (age 88–89); Jaffna, British Ceylon (now Sri Lanka)
- Education: University of Colombo
- Known for: Pioneer of sleep medicine in Singapore; founding of the SGH Sleep Disorders Unit and the Singapore Sleep Society
- Notable work: The Curious Adventures of a Doctor from Jaffna: From Old World Charm to Majulah Singapura (2013)
- Awards: Invaluable Services Award (Singapore Ministry of Health); Long Service Award (Singapore General Hospital); Lifetime Achievement Award in Neurology (ASEAN Neurological Association)
- Scientific career
- Fields: Neurology, Sleep medicine
- Workplaces: Singapore General Hospital

Dr. K. Puvanendran (born 1937) is a Sri Lankan-born Singaporean neurologist and a pioneer of sleep medicine in Singapore. He is a former Senior Consultant and Associate Professor of Neurology at Singapore General Hospital (SGH), where he established the country’s first dedicated Sleep Disorders Unit in 1987 and later founded the Singapore Sleep Society.

== Early life and education ==
Puvanendran was born in 1937 in Jaffna, then part of British Ceylon (now Sri Lanka). He had an early education at Jaffna Central College and then studied medicine at the University of Colombo, graduating with a Bachelor of Medicine in 1962. He became a Member of the Royal College of Physicians (London) in 1968, and was later elected a Fellow in 1986. He also became a Fellow of the Academy of Medicine, Singapore.

== Medical career ==
In 1971, Puvanendran moved to Singapore and joined Outram Road General Hospital (later renamed Singapore General Hospital). He went on to serve more than five decades in neurology at SGH, holding the positions of Senior Consultant and Associate Professor of Neurology.

He was instrumental in establishing the Sleep Disorders Unit at SGH in 1987, the first of its kind in Singapore, and later played a central role in forming the Singapore Sleep Society. His efforts earned him the reputation as the “Father of Sleep Medicine in Singapore.”

== Research contributions ==
Puvanendran has published more than 150 scientific papers in peer-reviewed journals. His work focused on neurology and sleep medicine, with landmark contributions to the study of sleep disorders in Asian populations.

One of his best-known studies, published in 1999, investigated the prevalence of snoring and obstructive sleep apnea in Singaporean patients. He also authored reviews on insomnia, sleep deprivation, and neurological disorders, helping to raise awareness of sleep health in Singapore.

== Awards and recognition ==
Puvanendran’s contributions have been recognized with multiple honors, including:

- Invaluable Services Award, Singapore Ministry of Health
- Long Service Award, Singapore General Hospital
- Lifetime Achievement Award in Neurology, ASEAN Neurological Association

== Publications and autobiography ==
In addition to his scientific publications, Puvanendran co-authored his autobiography The Curious Adventures of a Doctor from Jaffna: From Old World Charm to Majulah Singapura (2013) with former Singapore President S. R. Nathan. The book chronicles his childhood in Sri Lanka, medical training, and career as a neurologist in Singapore.

== Legacy ==
Puvanendran is regarded as a pioneer of sleep medicine in Singapore, having trained generations of neurologists and sleep specialists. His establishment of the SGH Sleep Disorders Unit laid the foundation for clinical sleep medicine practice in the country.

== See also ==
- Singapore General Hospital
- Sleep medicine
- Neurology
