= Methodist Church, Pettah =

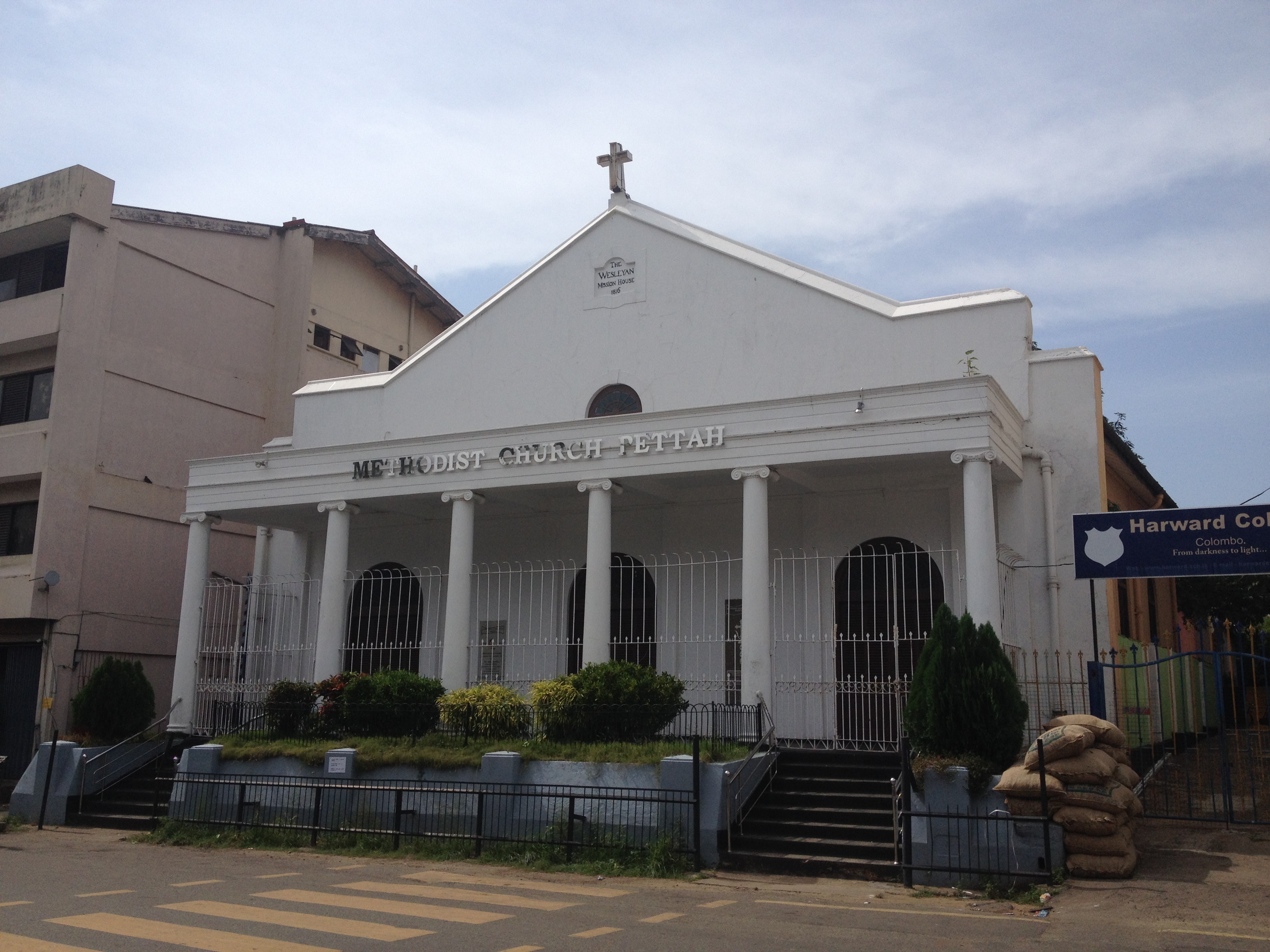

Religion
- Affiliation: Methodism
- Status: Active

Location
- Location: Pettah, Sri Lanka
- Interactive map of Methodist Church, Pettah
- Coordinates: 06°56′20.5″N 79°51′23.3″E

Architecture
- Type: Church
- Completed: 22 December 1816

Methodist Church in Pettah is a Methodist church situated in Colombo, Sri Lanka. It is considered as the first Methodist church, established in Sri Lanka as well as Asia. The church building has been formally recognised by the Government as an archaeological protected monument in Sri Lanka. The designation was declared on 17 May 2013 under the government Gazette number 1811.

== History ==
The Methodist Church in Sri Lanka was originated early in the 19th century when the island (then called Ceylon) was under the British rule. On 31 December 1813 six British missionaries, William Ault, Benjamin Clough, George Erskine, Thomas Hall, William Martin Harvard and James Lynch, sailed for Ceylon to begin their mission in the island under the leadership of Thomas Coke. However, during the voyage Coke become ill and was found dead on the floor of his cabin room. He was buried at sea on 3 May 1814. Harvard remained in Bombay whilst the others continued on their journey, landing at Weligama on 29 June 1814, six months after it commenced from London.

Ten days after the arrival they decided to split up and travel to different parts of Ceylon. Lynch and Squance went north to Jaffna, Ault north-east to Batticaloa, Erskine to Matara whilst Clough remained in Galle. Harvard arrived in Galle in early 1815 and was subsequently posted to Colombo. Harvard (c. 1790 - 15 December 1857) was trained as a printer and in 1810 became a probationer for the ministry in the Wesleyan Methodist Conference, volunteering in 1813 to join Coke in establishing Methodist missions in India and Ceylon. He was ordained in 1813 in London. In 1816 with the help of Andrew Armour, a former army officer and school teacher, he purchased a portion of land on Dam Street and built the first Methodist chapel (known as Wesleyan Mission House) in Asia. The chapel was constructed under the guidance of the Surveyor-General of Ceylon, Captain Gualterus Schneider. Its design was modelled on the Brunswick Wesleyan Chapel in Liverpool.

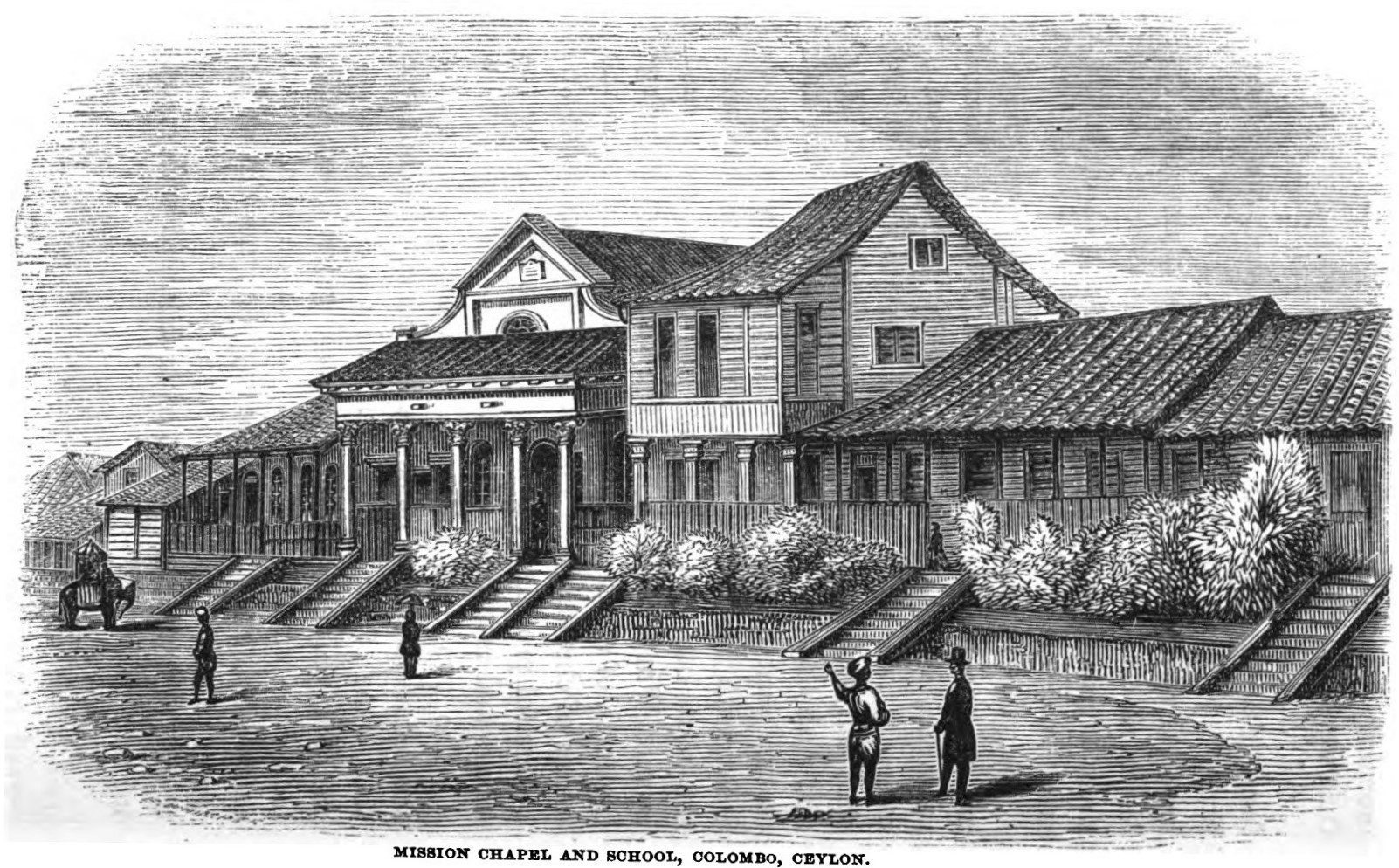
1865 engraving of Wesleyan Mission Chapel and School

The first service at the chapel was held on 22 December 1816, and was jointly conducted by Harvard and Clough. It was attended by the Governor of Ceylon Robert Brownrigg, his wife and a number of local civic and military dignitaries. The building complex comprised a chapel, dwelling house for two families, a large schoolroom, printing and bookbinding offices, a type foundry and warehouses. The chapel was described in the 'Government Gazette' as "almost an amphitheatre, with three rows of elevated seats nearly all around".

In 1863 the arrangement of the seats was altered and the pulpit which was formerly at the same end as the entrance porch was moved to the opposite side. On 2 March 1874 the first classes of Wesley College, Colombo were held in the schoolroom. The college continued to be conducted from these premises until 1907 when the school was moved to its current location in Borella. In 1966 the building was remodelled and the exterior of the chapel was slightly modified.

== See also ==
- Christianity in Sri Lanka
