= A. E. Tamber =

Sri Lankan educator and school principal

- Born: 26 October 1904; Ceylon
- Died: 18 February 1971 (aged 66); Sri Lanka
- Occupations: Educator and Nationalist Activist
- Known for: Founding member of the Jaffna Youth Congress

Alfred Edward Tamber (26 October 1904 – 18 February 1971), commonly known as A. E. Tamber, was a Sri Lankan educator and nationalist activist associated with the early Tamil political movement in northern Ceylon. He served as principal of Jaffna Central College from 1962 to 1964 and has been identified in historical studies as a founding member of the Jaffna Youth Congress.

The Jaffna Youth Congress was an influential political and social organisation formed in the 1920s by Tamil intellectuals and educators advocating constitutional reform, secularism, non-sectarian Ceylonese nationalism and independence from Britain. The movement reached its high point when it organised a boycott of the 1931 elections under the Donoughmore Constitution, arguing that the constitutional reforms did not grant full independence for Ceylon.

== Early life and education ==
Tamber was born in Ceylon (present-day Sri Lanka).

He was educated at Jaffna Central College, where he was a former student (old boy).

He obtained a Bachelor of Science (B.Sc.)(London) degree and entered the teaching profession during the colonial period.

He was listed as a member of the teaching staff in the University of Ceylon Calendar for 1950.

== Career ==
Tamber spent much of his career at Jaffna Central College, one of the leading secondary schools in northern Sri Lanka. He served in several roles including teacher and senior staff member before becoming vice-principal and then principal.

Tamber served as president of the All Ceylon Union of Teachers from 1949 to 1951.

He served as vice-principal from 1958 to 1962 and as principal from 1962 to 1964.

His principalship occurred during a significant transition in Sri Lankan education when many private and missionary schools were taken over by the state following education reforms implemented in the early 1960s.

== Death and legacy ==
Tamber died on 18 February 1971. Following his death, a commemorative publication titled A. E. Tamber: A Memorial Volume was published in 1972 in recognition of his contributions to education in Jaffna.

== See also ==
- Education in Sri Lanka
