= Sri Sumedha Maha Vidyalaya, Malimbada =

Sri Sumedha Vidyalaya, Malimbada
- ශ්‍රී සුමේධ මහා විද්‍යාලය, මාළිම්බඩ

Location
- Malimbada; Matara, Sri Lanka, 81050
- Coordinates: 6.009441°N 80.518212°E

Information
- School type: Public provincial 1C
- Motto: Sinhala: නැණින් පෙරට (Going forward using discretion)
- Religious affiliation: Buddhism
- Established: 1894; 132 years ago
- Principal: W. M. Vageesha Perera
- Staff: 67
- Grades: 1 to 13
- Gender: Girls & Boys
- Enrollment: 1000
- Colors: Gold & Maroon
- Website: schoolsmv.weebly.com

Sri Sumedha Maha Vidyalaya is a government school in Matara, Sri Lanka. It was established in 1894.

== History ==
The school was established in 1894 by the Methodist Church with eleven students and was known as Batathumbe Methodist College (Sinhala: බටතුඹේ මෙතෝදිස්ත විද්‍යාලය) for several decades. The first principal of this school was B. De Silva and there were two teachers. The first student of this school was a principal of a school.

The school became a government school in 1912 and the name was changed into Malimbada Sri Sumedha Maha Vidyalaya as a proposal of Mr Samarawickrama, a former principal of this school. Formerly, there were only primary and secondary classes, but the permission was granted to start Advanced Level classes on 10 January 1982. In 1990 R. K. Wijesekara took over as principal of the school.

Principals from 1948

Period	Name
1948.01.15 – 1958.05.01	J. A. De Silva
1958.05.06 – 1958.12.31	C. P. Somanayake
1959.01.01 – 1969.02.25	R. P. A. Wickramasinghe
1969.02.26 – 1970.05.01	H. T. Dharmasena
1970.05.01 – 1970.12.31	H. L. Andrayas
1971.01.01 – 1971.08.12	H. T. Dharmasena
1971.08.12 – 1972.04.30	Martin Sudangama
1972.05.01 – 1979.07.08	H. Samarawickrama
1979.07.08 – 1980.01.23	S. M. D. Samaraweera
1984.03.12 – 1984.07.01	P. Wickramarachchi
1984.07.01 – 1990.03.05	Y. A. Gunawardhana
1990.03.05 – 1990.10.15	K. A. S. Abekoon
1990.03.05 – 1990.10.15	V. K. Gamage
1990.10.15 – 2001.05.23	R. K. Wijesekara
2001.05.24 – 2002.11.21	D. R. Somapala
2002.11.22 – 2015.05.22	U. Amara Rajini
2015.05.23 – 2017.12.06	M. A. Kumarasiri
2017.12.07 – present	W. M. Vageesha Perera

== Houses ==
Students are divided into four houses. The house names are derived from the past kings of Sri Lanka.

- Vijaya - In honour of King Vijaya
- Gemunu - In honour of King Dutugamunu
- Gajaba - In honour of King Gajabahu I

== Awards ==
- All Island Inter School Productivity Contest 2009 - 3rd Place
- Best-managed school in Akuressa Education Zone
