= N. Shanmugarajah =

N. Shanmugarajah MIEE
- Born: 6 November 1912
- Education: Jaffna Central College
- Occupation: Engineer

Nadarajah Shanmugarajah was a Ceylon Tamil engineer and general manager of the Ceylon Electricity Board.

== Early life and family ==
Shanmugarajah was born on 6 November 1912. He was the son of S. Nadarajah and Pakialakshmi from Vannarpannai in northern Ceylon. He was educated at Jaffna Central College. He then studied engineering at Ceylon Technical College in Colombo.

Shanmugarajah married Padmavathy, daughter of Duraipillai. They had three children (Priyadarshani, Chitraleka and Ravi Prakash).

== Career ==
Shanmugarajah worked as an apprentice for Calendar Cables Ltd in India before joining the Department of Electrical Undertakings in Ceylon. After a series of promotions he became general manager of the Ceylon Electricity Board.
