= Jaffna Central College =

- யாழ்ப்பாணம் மத்திய கல்லூரி; යාපනය මධ්‍ය මහා විද්‍යාලය

Location
- Rajendra Prasath Road; Jaffna, Northern Province; Sri Lanka; 9°39′41.90″N 80°0′51.20″E

Information
- School type: Public national 1AB
- Motto: In gloriam Dei optimi maximi (Unto the glory of God, the best and the highest)
- Religious affiliation: Methodist
- Denomination: Methodist Church in Sri Lanka
- Founded: 1816; 210 years ago
- Founder: James Lynch; Thomas Squance
- School district: Jaffna Education Zone
- Authority: Ministry of Education
- School number: 1001002
- Principal: V. E. Gaston Roy
- Teaching staff: 150
- Grades: 1-13
- Gender: Boys
- Age range: 5-19
- Houses: Wilks, Romaine, Lynch, Percival, Bulloh
- Slogan: Central's flag must never be lowered
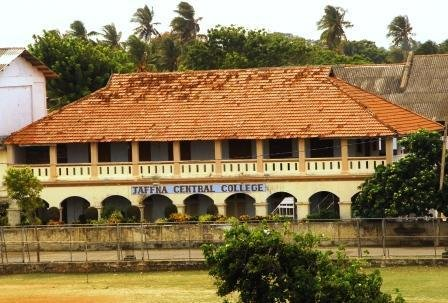

Jaffna Central College (Tamil: யாழ்ப்பாணம் மத்திய கல்லூரி Yāḻppāṇam Mattiya Kallūri, JCC) is a national school in Jaffna, Sri Lanka. Founded in 1816 by British Methodist missionaries, it is one of Sri Lanka's oldest schools.

== History ==
In 1813 the Methodist's British Conference approved the establishment of missions in Ceylon, Java and the Cape of Good Hope. On 30 December 1813 Dr Thomas Coke, seven missionaries (William Ault, Benjamin Clough, George Erskine, Martin Harvard, James Lynch, Thomas H. Squance) and two of the missionaries' wives left Portsmouth and sailed to Ceylon. Mrs Ault and Coke died on the journey. When the arrived in Bombay they had little money but they were helped by Governor Evan Nepean and W. T. Money, a merchant. Five of the missionaries (Ault, Clough, Erskine, Lynch and Squance) sailed from Bombay on 20 June 1814 and arrived in Galle on the south coast of Ceylon on 29 June 1814. On 11 July 1814 the missionaries gathered together to decide who would be stationed where – Lynch and Squance were to go to Jaffna in the north; Ault was to go to Batticaloa in the east; Erskine was to go to Matara in the south; and Clough was to remain in Galle. Clough was later joined by Harvard and his wife. Lynch and Squance left Galle on 14 July 1814 and arrived in Jaffna on 10 August 1814 where they established the Wesleyan Methodist Mission, North Ceylon.

On 1 August 1816 the mission purchased from the government the former orphanage situated opposite the esplanade in Jaffna. In the period of 1816 - 1817 the Jaffna Wesleyan English School was founded with Rev. Lynch as principal. The school transferred to the Vembadi site in 1825. The school was renamed Jaffna Central School in 1834 by the then principal Rev. Dr. Peter Percival. In the same year a separate girls school was established which was renamed Vembadi Girls' High School in 1897. JCC prospered, becoming affiliated to Madras University (1869) and Calcutta University (1897).

In 1945 JCC started providing free education. Most private schools in Ceylon, including JCC, were taken over by the government in 1960. In 1994 JCC became a national school.

JCC's principal Kanapathy Rajadurai was shot dead on 12 October 2005 in Jaffna.

== Crest ==
JCC's crest and colours were introduced in 1901 by Romaine Cooke, the then vice-principal. The lower arc of the crest contains JCC's moto: In gloriam Dei optimi maximi (Unto the glory of God, the best and the highest). The key symbolises JCC being an instrument that unlocks those leading to knowledge. The yarl symbolises JCC's host city Jaffna. The rising sun symbolises the light of learning that radiates from JCC.

== Big Match ==
JCC play St. John's College, Jaffna in an annual cricket match known as the Battle of the North or the Battle of the Blues. The first match took place in 1904. This is the longest running cricket encounter in the Jaffna peninsula & the 3rd oldest cricket encounter in Sri Lanka. No matches were played in 1948, 1961, 1985, 1986, 1987, 1988, 1989, 1991, 1996 and 1997. The 1967 match was abandoned due to bad weather. The schools played two matches in 1904, 1908, 1909, 1918, 1919, 1921 and 1922. Central won the 1904 match but it wasn't until 1908 that St. John's won a match.

== Academic staff ==
=== Principals ===
- 1816 Rev. James Lynch
- 1819 Rev. James Lynch
- 1820–24 Rev. Robert Carver
- 1825 Rev. Joseph Roberts
- 1834–51 Rev. Dr. Peter Percival
- 1852–54 Rev. John Walton
- 1855 Rev. William Barber
- 1859–61 Rev. William Talbot
- 1862–66 Rev. John Mitchell
- 1867–70 Rev. John O. Rhodes
- 1870–72 Rev. D.P. Niles (acting)
- 1873–74 Rev. Samuel R. Wilkin
- 1874–76 Rev. William R. Winston
- 1877–78 Edward Strutt
- 1879–81 Fredrick M. Webster
- 1882 Thomas Little
- 1883 William J. G. Bestall
- 1884 Joseph West
- 1885–86 Rev. A. E. Restarick
- 1886–87 Rev. D. P. Niles (acting)
- 1888–89 Rev. Sheldon Knapp
- 1890 Rev. E. Middleton Weaver
- 1891–93 Rev. W. T. Garret
- 1894–95 Rev. Gabriel Leese
- 1896–98 Rev. W. T. Garret
- 1899 Rev. George B. Robeson (acting)
- 1900 Rev. E. O. Martin
- 1901 Rev. Arthur Lockwood
- 1901–03 Rev. W. T. Garret
- 1903–08 Rev. W. M. P. Wilkes
- 1908–10 Rev. H. A. Meek
- 1910–16 Rev. W. M. P. Wilkes
- 1916 Rev. E. T. Selby (acting)
- 1917–21 Rev. Harold Bullough
- 1921 Rev. H.R. Cornish (acting)
- 1922–26 Rev. Percy T. Cash
- 1927 J. K. Chanmukam (acting)
- 1928–32 Rev. Percy T. Cash
- 1933 R. J. Seal (acting)
- 1934–39 Rev. Percy T. Cash
- 1940–42 R. S. D. Williams
- 1943–44 J. W. Arudpragasam
- 1945–55 Rev. C. A. Smith
- 1949 J. C. Charles (acting)
- 1956–62 Rev. Dr. D. T. Niles
- 1962–64 A. E. Tamber
- 1964–71 E. Sabalingam
- 1971–80 E. K. Shanmuganathan
- 1980–82 N. S. Rathinasingham
- 1983–90 V. Balasuntharam
- 1990 N. Rasaratnam
- 1990–96 N. K. Shanmuganathapillai
- 1996 S. Sivanrooban (acting)
- 1996–05 K. Rajadurai
- 2006–08 S. Pathmanathan (acting)
- 2009–11 L. Ongaramoorthy
- 2011–23 S. K. Elilventhan
- 2023–2024 S. Indrakumar (acting)
- 2024 – 2026 C. S. R. Selvagunalan
- 2026 (March-July) K. Senthilvadivelu (acting)
- 2026 - present V. E. Gaston Roy

== Notable alumni ==
Name	Notability	Reference
V. Appapillai	physicist, dean – Faculty of Science University of Ceylon (1970–1979)	
Sabaratnam Arulkumaran	physician, president Royal College of Obstetricians and Gynaecologists (2007–2010), president International Federation of Gynaecology and Obstetrics (2012–2015), president British Medical Association (2013–2014)	
K. S. Arulnandhy	teacher, academic, deputy director of Education (1946–1950)	
J. N. Arumugam	Permanent Secretary – Ministry of Transport and Works	
A. Canagaratnam	member Legislative Council – Northern Province South (1924–1930)	
Douglas Devananda	member parliament – Jaffna (1994–present)	
Waithilingam Duraiswamy	member State Council of Ceylon – Kayts (1936–1947), Legislative Council – Northern Province West (1924–1930), Northern Province (1921–1924)	
Yogendra Duraiswamy	Government Agent – Jaffna (1979–1982)	
Nagalingam Ethirveerasingam	athlete (1952 Olympics, 1956 Olympics, 1958 Commonwealth Games, 1954 Asian Games, 1958 Asian Games (gold medalist – high jump))	
K. Kanag-Isvaran	lawyer and President's Counsel	
A. W. Mailvaganam	Dean – Faculty of Science University of Ceylon (1948–1954)	
M. A. Abdul Majeed	member parliament – Pottuvil (1960–1977), Sammanthurai (1977–1988), National List (1989–1994)	
K. V. Nadarajah	member parliament – Bandarawela (1947–1952)	
Arumuka Navalar	Hindu revivalist	
V. N. Navaratnam	member parliament – Chavakachcheri (1956–1983)	
D. T. Niles	pastor, evangelist, president Ceylon Methodist Conference (1964–1970)	
Jaya Pathirana	member parliament – Kurunegala (1961–1965), Supreme Court Judage (1972–1978)	
S. C. Paul	surgeon	
K. Puvanendran	neurologist	
S. A. Raheem	member parliament – Mannar (1974–1977)	
J. M. Rajaratnam	Vice President Singer Company	
Visvanathan Rudrakumaran	Prime Minister Transnational Government of Tamil Eelam	
A. Sabapathy	member Legislative Council (1917–1921)	
Nevins Selvadurai	member State Council (1934–1935)	
N. Shanmugarajah	general manager Ceylon Electricity Board	
C. Sittampalam	member parliament – Mannar (1947–1956)	
Kanagaratnam Sriskandan	Chief Highway Engineer Department for Transport (UK)	
P. Sriskandarajah	Supreme Court Judge (1962–1967)	
Sivaguru S. Sritharan	Former vice chancellor at the Ramaiah University of Applied Sciences	
Alagu Subramaniam	writer, a prominent figure in London's Bloomsbury literary circle, a Barrister-at-Law of The Honourable Society of Lincoln's Inn, and an Advocate of the Supreme Court of Ceylon.	
A. R. Surendran	President's Counsel	
Suthan Suthersan	Environmental engineer	
A. E. Tamber	Educator, Nationalist Activist and former president of the All Ceylon Union of Teachers (1949-1951).	
Robin Tampoe	filmmaker	
Herbert Thambiah	Chief Justice (1991), Supreme Court Judge (1984–1992)	
Henry Thambiah	Supreme Court Judge (1960–1972)	
Vincent Thamotheram	Supreme Court Judge (1970–1980)	
Daniel Thiagarajah	Bishop of Jaffna (2006–present)	
J. Thiviyanathan	member parliament – Ampara (1989–1984)	
K. M. Chellappah	Founder of Jaffna public library	

== See also ==
- List of schools in Northern Province, Sri Lanka
