= Vembadi Girls High School =

Vembadi Girls' High School
- வேம்படி மகளிர் உயர்தரப் பாடசாலை

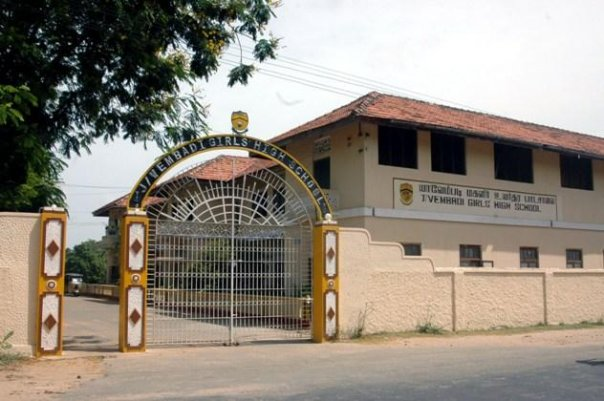

Location
- 1st Cross Street; Jaffna; Sri Lanka; 9°39′46.40″N 80°0′54.80″E

Information
- School type: Public national 1AB
- Motto: Dare to do right
- Religious affiliation: Methodist
- Denomination: Methodist Church in Sri Lanka
- Founded: 1834; 192 years ago
- Founder: James Lynch; Thomas Squance; Peter Percival
- School district: Jaffna Education Zone
- Authority: Ministry of Education
- School number: 1001009
- Principal: Mrs. V. Shanmukaratnam
- Teaching staff: 99
- Grades: 6-13
- Gender: Girls
- Age range: 11-18
- Hours in school day: 6
- Houses: Thambiah Hornby; Lythe; Scowcroft Creedy
- Colours: Yellow and Black
- Slogan: Dare to do right
- Publication: The torch bearer Flamboyant

Vembadi Girls’ High School (Tamil: வேம்படி மகளிர் உயர்தரப் பாடசாலை Vēmpaṭi Mahaḷir Uyartarap Pāṭacālai) is a national school in Jaffna, Sri Lanka. Founded in 1834 by British Methodist missionaries, it is one of Sri Lanka's oldest schools.

== History ==
Methodist missionaries from Britain arrived in Ceylon on 29 June 1814. Two of the missionaries, Rev. James Lynch and Rev. Thomas Squance, traveled to Jaffna leaving Galle on 14 July 1814 and arriving in Jaffna on 11 August 1814, to establish a mission. In 1817, the Jaffna Wesleyan English School was founded with Rev. Lynch as principal. Despite it being a boys school, there were a few girls enrolled as well. The school was renamed Jaffna Central School in 1834 by the then principal Rev. Dr. Peter Percival. In the same year a separate girls school was established. The girls school was renamed Vembadi Girls' High School in 1897.

In 1944, Vembadi started providing free education. Most private schools in Ceylon, including Vembadi, were taken over by the government in 1960. In 1984 Vembadi became a national school.

== See also ==
- Category:Alumni of Vembadi Girls' High School
- List of schools in Northern Province, Sri Lanka
