= Southlands College, Galle =

Southlands College
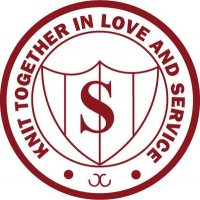
- Crest of Southlands College
- Galle; Sri Lanka

Information
- Type: Government Public School
- Motto: Knit together in love and service ප්‍රේමයෙන්ද සේවයෙන්ද බැඳීසිටින්නෙමු
- Established: 1885
- Principal: Sumedha kariyawasam
- Grades: Primary to G.C.E. (A/L)
- Age: 6 to 19
- Enrolment: 4000
- Campus size: 1.2Acres
- Colours: Red and white
- Affiliation: Methodist Church in Sri Lanka
- Website: www.southlandscollege.lk

Southlands College is a girls' school located in Galle, Sri Lanka, founded in 1885 by the Wesleyan Methodist missionaries. Southlands College is situated within the historical Galle fort.

Southlands College is the premier Girls school in Southern Sri Lanka. It was started during the British rule in 1885. Lucy Vanderstraaten was the first principal. The school began in two larger down-stair rooms in a house in Fort with a group of some 50 children. It was originally named "Wesleyan Girls School".

== History ==
Long before Sri Lanka came under Western Rule, education was primarily in the hands of the priests in the village temple. It was the main institution for education. Under Portuguese and Dutch rulers the prevailing system was changed and gradually the church started running elementary schools in villages. When the British took over the administration in the 19th Century several changes were made in the country's education system

"Another important influence that entered the island with British occupation was in the realm of Christian missionary education and religious activity. The liberal attitude toward private missionary activity soon attracted many missions to the Island. All these missionary societies concentrated on education, for this was held to be the key to conversion. The government was content to leave education, in the hands of the mission and to provide them with grants. Besides being economical, it was also the way education was organized in Britain. The British government in Ceylon had no consistent policy on education, and support to the missions depended on the predilections of the Governor. The missions opened and managed their own schools in various parts of the country on funds sent by home organizations." (Arsaratnam, 1964: 154)

"The Chief Justice of Ceylon, Alexander Johnston on a visit to England in 1809 conferred with Wilberforce who recommended Ceylon as a field for a Wesleyan Mission..... The arrival of the first five Methodist Missionaries at Galle [took place in] June 1814 .... In 1884 Government gave up all its English schools except Royal College. The English schools were handed over to the Christian Missions ....The Government Girls High School which was in Galle Fort was handed over to the Methodist Mission." (Roberts, 1993: 117–119)

In 1885 Wesleyan Girls School was opened with a group of 51 pupils in two large class rooms. Miss Lucy Vanderstraaten became the first principal.

As recounted in the Southlands B.M.V Centenary 1885–1985 magazine, Miss Westlake was the tenth principal of the school assuming duties as principal in 1907 and she served the school for eleven years. A new era dawned with her as the principal with many improvements occurring during her period. She travelled to college from the Wesleyan Missionary headquarters at Richmond Hill and is credited with opening up a hostel in a residence at Light House Street in Fort with four pupils and a teacher. She did her best to upgrade the school and to her credit there was a significant expansion of material resources of the school and steady improvement in the quality of education imparted to the students. A science room and a class room for the kindergarten children were newly built by her. The expenses to put up these buildings were met by the government, past pupils, and well wishers.

She was capable of doing all these improvements during her period due to her frugal and efficient management of the school finances. It was during her time in 1914 that the Past Pupils Association was formed. Southlands became the first school to have a Girl Guide Company in Galle. Miss Freethy who was the vice principal during Miss Westlake's era became the principal of the school in 1918 when Miss Westlake left Sri Lanka.

During Miss Freethy's tenure, several changes occurred. The school was renamed Southlands in 1922. The name was selected to recognize Miss Westlake's work at the school, as she had trained at Southlands Methodist College in Wimbledon, England. Southlands is a girls' school located in the South and is one of the oldest girls’ schools in Sri Lanka.

Today Southlands has become a centre for learning not only in the South but also one of the national educational institutions in the Island.

== School story ==
During the long period Southlands College developed in the academic field as well as in many extra-curricular activities. In addition to the normal primary education of the school, Southlands pupils had the privilege of learning music, singing, western and eastern drama, dancing physical training and a number of sports as tennis, netball and cricket. Home economics, Needle work, Handicraft and Guiding etc. were yet others since all those subjects were introduced to the main school curriculum in that era.

1902–1907: Southlands College started her rapid development during the period of Mrs. E. Ludovici, a past pupil, a member of the tutorial staff, who rose to be the Principal in 1902. During her period Physical Education and Western Music were introduced. A school Library was founded to develop the reading habits of the students.

1907–1918: Miss. M. Westlake, the distinguished principal who succeeded Ms. Ludovici, made many changes for the further development of the school. A Boarding House was started to help the students who came from a far. A Science Laboratory and a Kindergarten unit were also built. The Old Pupils Association was inaugurated in 1914 with much enthusiasm to help the school and first Galle Guide Company was formed in the school in 1917. A new era dawned in the school during the eleven years of her dedicated service.

1918–1935: Miss. Freethy took over the administration in 1918 and rendered her services for 11 long years being another dedicated missionary. She developed the college in many fields. The first school magazine was edited and published to hail the dawn of progress. Since the number of pupils increased, hostel facilities were in great demand. During her period, a well wisher of the school, Muhandiram Wickramasinghe, very generously donated a building for the hostel in memory of his daughters named "Wickramasinghe Hostel". This turned out to be a great asset to the school. Rapid development of the school made the Government upgrade the school to a secondary school. Along with the change Miss Freethy found a new name to the school too and it became Southlands College in 1902. The name was specially chosen to honor Miss. Westlake, the much devoted Principal, who had her missionary training at Southlands College, Wimbledon before her arrival in Sri Lanka.

We should remember Miss. Freethy for guiding the pupils in qualities of leadership by introducing the house system into the school administration. Thus the four houses were born in honor of four lady missionaries, Westlake, Wiseman, Hellier and Hunter. In 1927, the school was given a much-needed assembly hall, and in 1930 a two-storey building was built to widen the hostel facilities in the school premises itself. Thus the "Resteric" hostel which is being used by boarders even today was declared open by the Governor of Ceylon, Sir Herbert Stanley. The year 1935 became a significant year during Miss. Freethy's period when the school celebrated the Golden Jubilee on a very grand scale. The song which was specially composed for the jubilee celebrations was made the school song and was sung until the school was vested in the Government.

1935–1946, 1950–1956: Miss. Edith Ridge graced Southlands in 1929 as the vice Principal. She succeeded Miss. Freethy and completed 20 long years as Principal. A rapid improvement was seen during her period when in 1954, she was able to build a two storied building to house the increasing number of students seeking admission. a year later, she completed the third storey of the building with the assistance given by all pupils and parents, teachers and all well-wishers and was declared open in 1956 as the "Ridge Building". It became a "Rich Building" with a large number of class rooms, an art room, science laboratory, Principal's quarters and the college office. The school developed rapidly during this period which could be considered a golden era of the college. The school was able to celebrate the 70th anniversary also in a very grand way during her period. She became the most loved Principal of pupils, teachers, parents and all well wishers in Southern Sri Lanka.

Much later in 1996, the O.P.A Colombo branch presented a felicitation volume "Golden Heart of Southlands" to her on her 96th Birthday in U.K. She was 99 years old when she died on 11 December 2002.

Development of the school since 1955:

1956–1960: When Miss. Edith Ridge left in 1956 the administration was handed over to the then vice principal, Miss. Leila Solomon, a qualified Educationist. Though it was not an easy task to succeed a Principal of that caliber, Miss. Solomon however was able to maintain the high standard of education in the school by introducing more changes to the school curriculum and administration. The Advanced Level Arts stream was introduced during her time. She encouraged all extra-curricular activities. The Guide Company and Brownie pack were revived. She succeeded in organizing a Parent-Teacher Association in 1958 which was of immense help to the school. She tried to educate the child through modern Technology, Audio Visual media being introduced into teaching in her time. She also tried to improve the quality of education by introducing General Knowledge competitions, Spelling contests and many other competitive activities. Library reading was made compulsory to improve the reading habit. She left in 1960 on a government scholarship to USA being the last missionary Principal of Southlands. Miss Solomon departed from us on the 29rh of October 2001.

1960–1962: This is considered an important period in the history of the school. The school was on the verge of being vested in Government and Miss. Queeni Abeywardena, loyal past pupil and devoted teacher for many years was appointed as the acting Principal for a short period. On fifth March 1962, Southlands College was vested in the Government according to the new educational policy. It saw the end of a memorable era and missionary management of the school. Miss. Q. Abeywardena retired from service as the last Christian Principal of Southlands.

1962–1972: Southlands became a government school and Mrs. Rupa Nanayakkara was appointed the firth Principal after the take over. She rendered valuable service for over 10 years as a devoted Principal who tried to develop the school in numerous ways. Advanced Level Science classes were introduced to pave the path for students to enter Medical College. She tried to develop the

skills of the student and all extra curricular activities were reintroduced. Along with the change of administration a new school song was composed replacing the old one.

The western Band and Oriental Orchestra were started. To encourage the Advanced Level Home Science students, a new Home science room was built. The most significant event during her era was that for the first time in the history of Southlands, an all night Pirith Ceremony was held followed by an alms giving the merit of which was bestowed on all past Principals, teachers and well wishers who had helped to make Southlands a major Educational Institute in the Southern Province. During Mrs. Nanayakkara's period the government commemorated the Educational Centenerary and Southlands College too celebrated it in a grand way. Special attention was given to English education with assistance given by devoted teachers such as Miss. Ludovici to improve the knowledge of the English language of the student. Fine Arts were revived and Mrs. Nanayakkara too encouraged producing many Sinhala stage drama with the assistance given by Mr. Herman Perera, keeping the old tradition of the school alive. For the first time in the School's history Southlands was fortunate enough to bring "Kusa Jathkaya" the stage drama on the boards at Lumbini Theatre to a full house.

During Mrs. Nanayakkara's period the number of students who sought admission to the school increased rapidly and the accommodation was not enough to house the Primary and Upper school together. Even though it was not a good solution, the primary classes were conducted in the afternoon due to lack of accommodation.

She rendered 10 years of devoted service to the upgrading of the school and left having been appointed Principal of Ananda Balika Vidyalaya, Colombo.

1972–1976: Mrs. L. Gunasingha succeeded Mrs. Nanayakkara and during her short period she helped to improve the standard of the school. The school was now endowed with a new two storied building. The school Hewisi Band was formed, the aesthetic unit improved and children participated in several all-island competitions. Guiding activities was revived and a Southlands student was fortunate enough to participate in the World Guiding Jamboree in U.S.A. representing Sri Lanka. She helped to inaugurate a branch of the National Savings Bank in the school.

1976–1991: Another memorable period dawned when an experienced teacher Mrs. Daniel, assumed duties as Principal and devoted her services for 15 long years for the betterment of the school. During her time many significant events occurred and Southlands College became popular due to continued academic achievement. The major event during this time was the upgrading of the school to an "A" grade one and being further promoted as one of the eighteen national schools in the Island in 1984. The student population increased and the school needed more accommodation to house the students comfortably. Thus a new two storied building was constructed. "Volanka" another large building adjoining the school was bought with the financial assistance given by renowned southern philanthropist Mr. B.R. Dissanayaka in memory of wife Kathleen Balage ho was a past pupil of the school.

The building was renamed as "Dissanayaka Building". The primary school children who were studying in the afternoon session for lack of accommodation had the privilege of having the best of facilities in modern class rooms again in the morning from 1984.

The Buddhist atmosphere pervading the school during Mrs. Nanayakkara's time was enhanced further when Mrs. Daniel did her best to construct a Buddhist shrine room for the benefit of

Buddhist children who comprised the majority of students to observe religious activities before the school began. A school co-operative society was established which is functioning well even today and a Teachers’ Guild too were formed during this period.

Southlands College completed 100 years of service in the field of education during Mrs. Daniel's tenure.

1991–1995: Mrs. K. Rajapaksa became the Principal in 1991. During her short stay the school was able to own a bus to provide traveling facilities to the student through the efforts of the OGA as one of their projects. Karate was introduced to the school curriculum and a building which was nearing completion was finished and declared open during her time.

1995–1999: Mrs. N. Kumarasinghe a devoted staff member who served the school for a number of years was appointed as the Principal in 1995. She made arrangements to build a modern auditorium for the college as the present assembly hall could not accommodate the increasing student population. She encouraged the present students to sing the old English school hymn full of valuable gems of advice every morning at assembly Special attempt was made to improve the quality of English knowledge of the student. Educational indoor games were encouraged and most valuable historical school magazine "First decade of the second century" was published. Mrs. Kumarasinghe retired in 1995 having rendered valuable service for many years at Southlands.

1999–2006: Mrs. Leelakanthi Gunawardena, a former student and long serving member of the teaching staff, assumed office as principal in 1999. She was the third past pupil to serve as principal of Southlands College. During her tenure, the school recorded several notable academic achievements. In 1999, a student secured first place in the All Island Advanced Level Examination in the Commerce stream. The following year, another student achieved first place in the Arts stream. In 2003, students from the school obtained second and third places in the General Certificate of Education Ordinary Level Examination.

In year 2002 a modern auditorium was handed over to the school by the Ministry of Education. The "Resteric" hostel which was 70 years old was renovated with the assistance of the Education Ministry and reopened to help accommodate the students who attend school from distant localities. Mrs. H L T Gunawardena left the school after getting a promotion as the ADE of Science and Maths in the Southern Province

2006–2007: Mrs. P A D Suneetha became the principal in 2006. During her short stay in school, she paid her attention in improving the quality of English in school. English camps, Singing assemblies were held for each and every grade. Mrs. P A D Suneetha left the school after getting a transfer to Horana Sripalee Vidyalaya

2007–Mrs Geethani Wijegunasinghe, a past pupil became the principal in 2007. The Advanced Level Bio-laboratory which was closed for some years was renovated and reopened for the use of the Students. For guiding the students in qualities of leadership, she introduced the ‘Junior Prefects’ in to the school administration. These Junior Prefects were selected from the grade nine classes.

== School crest and motto ==
=== School Crest ===
The first appearance of the school crest was on the outer cover page of the Diamond college magazine (1885–1945) during the period of Miss Edith Ridge.

After the school was vested in the Government the crest was changed. The Letter in the centre of the crest was changed and instead of the letter ‘S’ the Sinhala letter ‘SA’ was installed on the centre of the crest (1962–1976).

The crest was printed in red on many magazines and printed matter before 1976. After 1977, red and silver colours had been used for the crest. In 1956, the crest and the motto are seen together in the magazine. Also in this magazine, the Sinhalese words are indicated on the top of the crest and the English wordings had been printed at the bottom. In historical context, the school was under Methodist missionary management during the period in which it was published.

After 1977 and up to now the English motto ‘Knit together in love and service’ is indicated on the crest but the Sinhalese words had been omitted.

=== School Motto ===
The school motto has been used in English and Sinhalese in an English medium school administered by foreign Missionaries during the period under British rule.

== Past principals ==
No	Name	Year
1	Lucy Vanderstraaten	1885
2	A. Poulier	1885
3	Annie Vanderwall	1885
4	Maud Demmer	1885
5	Isobel Rogers	1886
6	Arthur Triggs	1887
7	G. B. Hay	1890
8	E. Stainton	1896
9	G. B. Hay	1897
10	E. Ludovici	1902
11	M. Westlake	1907
12	M. Freethy	1918
13	E. Ridge	1935
14	E. Hibbard	1948
15	F. A. de S. Adihetty	1948
16	E. W. Paranavithane	1950
17	M. H. Taylor	1950
18	E. Ridge	1950
19	L. Solomon	1956
20	Q. B. A. Abeywardene	1960
21	R. Nanayakkara	1962
22	L. Gunasinghe	1972
23	G. Daniel	1976
24	K. L. S. Rajapaksa	1991
25	H. H. Kumarasinghe	1994
26	H. T. L Gunawardena	1999
27	P. A. D. Suneetha	2006
28	G. Wijegunasinghe	2007
29	Shanthi Senevirathna	2010
30	Sandya Irani Pathiranawasam	2016
31	Shanthi Senevirathna	2021
32	Sumedha Kariyawasam	2022

== Notable alumni ==
- Anoma Sooriyaarachchi – Sri Lankan track and field athlete
