= A. Sabapathy =

Ceylon Tamil politician

Arunachalam Sabapathy MLC
- அருணாசலம் சபாபதி
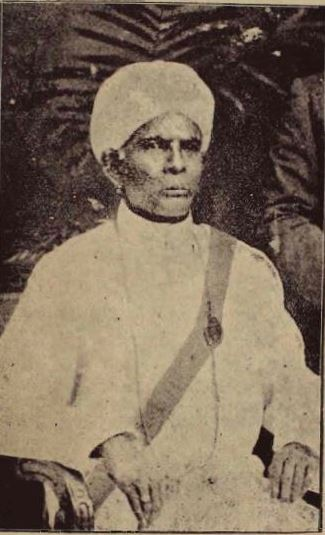

Tamil Member of the Legislative Council of Ceylon
- In office 1917–1921
- Preceded by: Charles Layard
- Succeeded by: P. Coomaraswamy

Personal details
- Born: 1853 Thalaiyali, Ceylon
- Died: 5 May 1924
- Education: Jaffna Central College
- Profession: Member of Legislative Council of Ceylon, Businessman
- Ethnicity: Ceylon Tamil

Arunachalam Sabapathy (1853 – 1924) was a Ceylon Tamil newspaper editor, politician and member of the Legislative Council of Ceylon.

== Early life and family ==
Sabapathy was born in 1853 in Thalaiyali, Kokkuvil near Vannarpannai in northern Ceylon. He was the son of Murugan Arunachalam and S. Annapillai. He was educated at Jaffna Central College.

Sabapathy married Sinnamma, daughter of Saravanamuthu Udayar and had two sons.

== Career ==
Sabapathy was appointed to the Legislative Council of Ceylon on 9 January 1917 as the second Tamil member He was founder secretary and president of the Jaffna Association, a political organisation representing the Tamils of Jaffna. The Jaffna Association and Sabapathy were persuaded to join the Ceylon National Congress (CNC) after P. Arunachalam gave them assurances in 1918 that the Sinhalese leaders of the CNC would do all that they could do to secure "as large a representation as possible to the Tamils". The First Manning Reforms did not live up to the assurances given by the CNC and in 1921 Sabapathy joined the newly formed Tamil Mahajana Sabha as its vice-president.

Sabapathy a founding member of the Saiva Paripalana Sabhai and a member of the Jaffna Local Board. He was editor of the Hindu Organ for 34 years. He was one of the founders of Jaffna Hindu College and served as its manager from 1913 to 1924.

== Death ==
Sabapathy died on 5 May 1924 at his home in Thalaiyali.
