= List of St Peter's College, Colombo alumni =

This is a list of alumni of St. Peter's College, Colombo, Sri Lanka.

Name	Notability	Reference
P. R. Anthonis	Chancellor University of Colombo (1981–2002)	
Russel Arnold	International cricket player (1997–2004)	
Andri Berenger	One Day International cricket player - UAE (2014–2015)	
Jimmy Bharucha	Radio broadcaster	
Shelley Wickramasinghe	Former Sri Lankan cricketer, Chairman of the National Sports Council, vice-president of Sri Lanka Cricket	
Ajith Nivard Cabraal	Governor of the Central Bank of Sri Lanka, (2006-2014, 2021-to date)	
H. L. de Silva	Ambassador/Permanent Representative to United Nations, President Bar Association of Sri Lanka	
Patrick Denipitiya	Musician	
Morris Wijesinghe	Musician	
Roy Dias	International cricket player (1982–1987)	
George Dissanaike	Emeritus Professor of Physics University of Peradeniya	
Chandra Fernando (police officer)	Inspector-General of Police (2004–2006)	
Roshan Goonetileke	Air Chief Marshall, Commander of Air Force (2006–2011), Chief of Defence Staff (2009–2011)	
David Heyn	One Day International cricket player (1975)	
Clive Inman	First-class cricket player	
Menaka Rajapakse	Cinema and television actor, and model	
Leslie Mervyn Jayaratne	Governor of Southern Province (1993–1994), Supreme Court Judge (Puisne Judge) of Fiji	
Neville Jayaweera	Chairman/Director-General Ceylon Broadcasting Corporation (1967–1972)	
Vinothen John	International cricket player (1983–1984)	
Desmond Kelly	Singer	
Kaushal Lokuarachchi	International cricket player (2003–2004)	
Alavi Moulana	Governor of Western Province (2002–2015)	
Tony Opatha	One Day International cricket player (1975–1979)	
Angelo Perera	One Day International cricket player (2013–2016)	
B. J. C. Perera	First President Sri Lanka College of Paediatricians	
Denis Perera	Commander of the Army (1977–1981), Chancellor General Sir John Kotelawala Defence University (1980)	
Henry Perera	Commander of the Navy (1979–1983)	
Sunil Perera	Musician, songwriter, composer	
Lester James Peries	Film director, producer	
Rumesh Ratnayake	International cricket player (1983–1992)	
Mahinda Samarasinghe	Member of parliament - Kalutara (1994–present)	
Amal Silva	International cricket player (1983–1988)	
Dinesh Subasinghe	Musician, composer	
Malinda Warnapura	International cricket player (2007–2009)	
Ahmed Zaki (politician)	Prime minister of Maldives (1972–1975)	
Roshan Biyanwila	Deputy Chief of Staff of the Sri Lanka Air Force	
