= V. Appapillai =

Sri Lankan physicist and academic

V. Appapillai FInstP CPhys
- Born: 13 November 1913; Batticaloa, Ceylon
- Died: 4 July 2001 (aged 87); Connecticut, USA
- Education: Jaffna Central College; Ceylon University College; University of Manchester
- Occupation: Academic

Velupillai Appapillai (13 November 1913 – 4 July 2001) was a Sri Lankan physicist and academic. He was the dean of the Faculty of Science at the University of Ceylon, Peradeniya.

== Early life and family ==
Appapillai was born on 13 November 1913 in Batticaloa in eastern Ceylon. He was educated at Jaffna Central College, graduating in 1931. After school he joined Ceylon University College, Colombo, graduating with a BSc degree in physics.

== Career ==
In 1936 Appapillai was appointed a demonstrator in physics at the Ceylon University College. He became a lecturer of physics in 1938. He carried out his doctoral research in Colombo before going to the University of Manchester in 1946 to work under P. M. S. Blackett, Langworthy Professor of Physics. Appapillai's work on the composition and origin of cosmic rays at sea level in Colombo earned him a PhD from the University of London.

After returning to Ceylon Appapillai collaborated with Blackett, Arnold Wolfendale and A. W. Mailvaganam in establishing that Associated Penetrating Particles did not exist within the limits of measurement. He was asked in 1963 to organise and develop a new Department of Physics at the University of Ceylon, Peradeniya. He was dean of the Faculty of Science at the university between 1970 and 1979 when he retired.

Appapillai was a fellow of the Institute of Physics and a Chartered Physicist. He was a member of the Ceylon Association for the Advancement of Science, Pan Indian Ocean Science Association (PIOSA), UNESCO National Commission, Ceylon Standards Advisory Council and the National Science Council of Ceylon Standards. He was the PIOSA's delegate at various international science conferences in the 1950s and 1960s. In 1958 he was an observer at the British nuclear tests at Maralinga in Australia.

== Later life ==
The University of Peradeniya appointed Appapillai an emeritus professor in 1979 and awarded him an honorary DSc degree in 1984. The University of Jaffna awarded him an honorary DSc degree in October 1999. Appapillai headed a committee appointed by the University Grants Commission which recommended the establishment of the Batticaloa University College. The University of Peradeniya has named one of its annual prizes after Appapillai.

Appapillai moved to the USA to live with his daughter. He died on 4 July 2001 in Connecticut.
