= K. Kanag-Isvaran =

K. Kanag-Isvaran PC
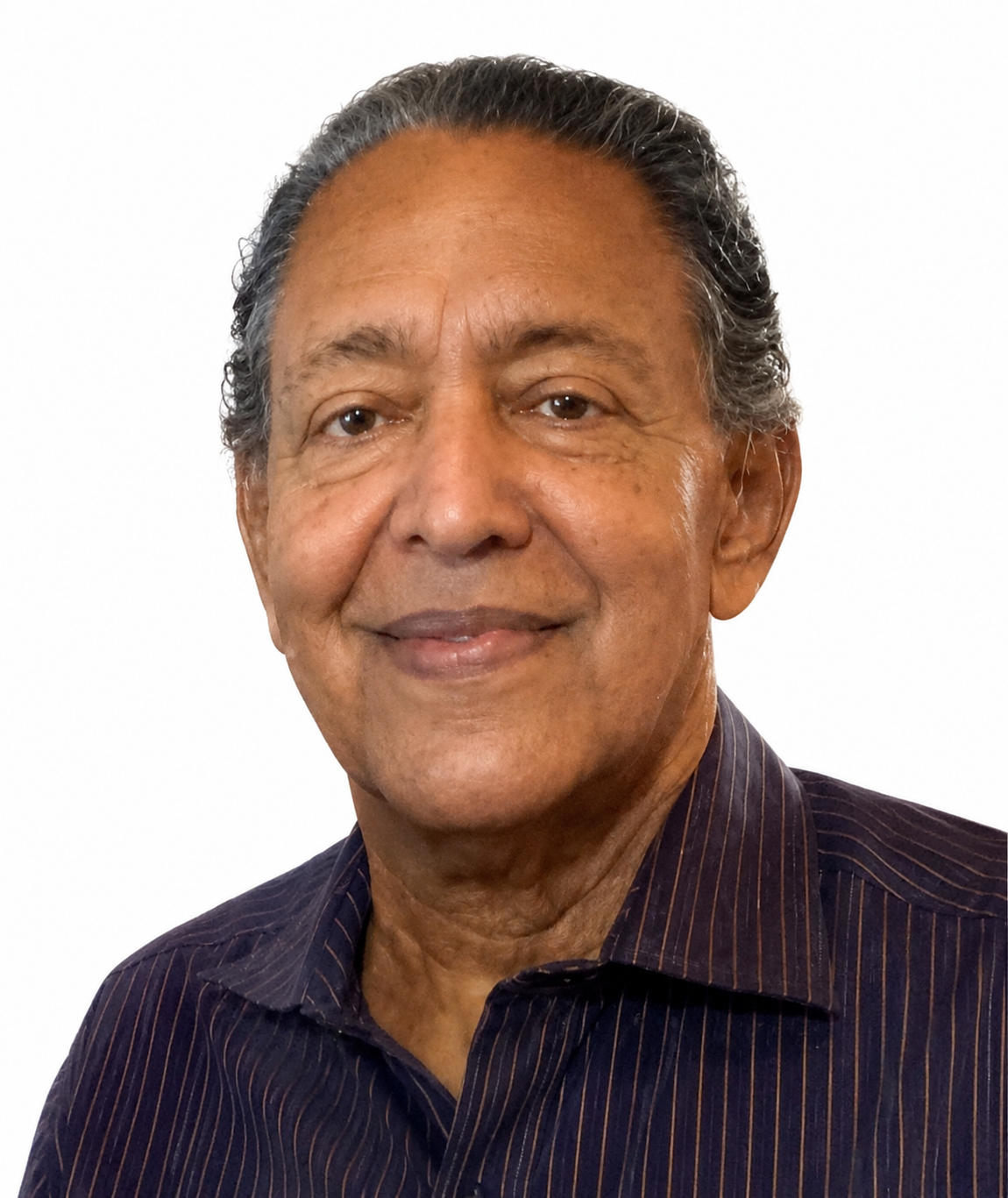
- Kanag-Isvaran in 2026
- Education: University of London
- Occupation: Lawyer

Kanaganayagam Kanag-Isvaran is a leading Sri Lankan Tamil lawyer and President's Counsel.

== Early life and family ==
Kanag-Isvaran is the son of S. R. Kanaganayagam, a lawyer and member of the Senate of Ceylon, and Satiammah. He was educated at Jaffna Central College. After school he joined the University of London, graduating with a LL.B. degree.

Kanag-Isvaran has two sons (Kishaan and Shivaan) and a daughter (Radhika). He also has seven grandchildren, Shayaana, Kiyaasha, Dhevinka, Anishka, Nirvaan, Khevaan and Nivaanya.

== Career ==
Kanag-Isvaran was called to the bar at Lincoln's Inn in June 1964. He was called to the bar in Ceylon in July 1966, becoming an advocate of the Supreme Court. He practices law in Colombo in the appellate and original courts, specialising in aviation, banking and finance, corporate, commercial, intellectual property, insurance, shipping and admiralty and telecommunication law. His clients include a number Sri Lanka's blue chip companies as well as multinational companies.

Kanag-Isvaran has appeared in a number of high-profile non-commercial legal cases including the controversial impeachment of Chief Justice Shirani Bandaranayake, the de-merger of the North Eastern Province, Tamil National Alliance's manifesto for the 2013 provincial council election, the dispute between Chief Minister of the Northern Province C. V. Vigneswaran and Chief Secretary R. Wijialudchumi and the ongoing attempt by residents of the Valikamam North High Security Zone to get their land back from the Sri Lankan military.

Kanag-Isvaran was a member of the Law Commission of Sri Lanka from 1994 to 2009, director of the Law and Society Trust and the Institute for the Development of Commercial Law and Practice Arbitration Centre, Colombo and chairman of a number of committees advising on new legislation. Kanag-Isvaran is a President's Counsel.

Kanag-Isvaran is a lecturer at the Faculty of Law, University of Colombo and a visiting lecturer at the Sri Lanka Law College. He has been a member of the council of the University of Colombo since 2004, having been appointed by the University Grants Commission. He joined the board of Associated Motorways (Private) Limited in December 2006 as an independent non-executive director. He is a trustee and former president of The National Trust Sri Lanka. In 2014 Kanag-Isvaran co-authored with attorney-at-law Dilshani Wijayawardana a book on company law.
