= J. N. Arumugam =

Leading Ceylon Tamil civil servant

J. N. Arumugam CCS CBE
- Born: 23 February 1896
- Education: Jaffna Central College; Ceylon Technical College
- Occupation: Civil servant

Joseph Nalliah Arumugam CBE (born 23 February 1896) was a leading Ceylon Tamil civil servant.

== Early life ==
Arumugam was born on 23 February 1896. He was from Katkovalam near Point Pedro in northern Ceylon. He was educated at Jaffna Central College. He then studied science at Ceylon Technical College. After passing the inter science examination he went to the UK on a scholarship. There, in December 1921, he joined the Ceylon Civil Service.

Arumugam married a daughter of Muttucumaru and, following her death, Lilly Chelliah.

== Career ==
Arumugam held several civil service positions in Ceylon and was a leading magistrate in Colombo. He became Petrol Controller in 1941 and Commissioner of Motor Transport in 1946. He was later Permanent Secretary at the Ministry of Transport and Works.

In the 1951 New Year Honours Arumugam was made a Commander of the Order of the British Empire.

== Death ==
Arumugam died in the 1960s after retirement.

== Joseph Nalliah Arumugam Memorial Award ==
In 1986 Arumugam's widow established an endowment to award scholarships for science students at the University of Colombo.
