= S. R. Kanaganayagam =

Ceylon Tamil lawyer (1904–1989)

Senator S. R. Kanaganayagam
- எஸ். ஆர். கனகநாயகம்

Member of the Senate of Ceylon
- In office 1949–1957

Personal details
- Born: 16 May 1904
- Died: 15 May 1989 (aged 84) Sydney, Australia
- Party: All Ceylon Tamil Congress
- Education: Hindu English School; Victoria College, Chulipuram; Jaffna College; Ceylon University College
- Profession: Lawyer
- Ethnicity: Ceylon Tamil

Suppiah Ratnasingham Kanaganayagam (16 May 1904 – 15 May 1989) was a Ceylon Tamil lawyer and member of the Senate of Ceylon.

== Early life and family ==
Kanaganayagam was born on 16 May 1904. He was from Sangarathai in northern Ceylon. Kanaganayagam was educated at Hindu English School, Vaddukoddai, Victoria College, Chulipuram and Jaffna College. He played football for the college. After school he joined Ceylon University College, graduating with an arts degree. He then entered Ceylon Law College, qualifying as an advocate.

Kanaganayagam married Satiammah, daughter of Selvaduari. They had a daughter (Savitri Devi) and two sons (Kanag-Isvaran and Maheswaran).

== Career ==
Kanaganayagam was called to the bar on 10 April 1933. He practised law at the Jaffna Bar.

Kanaganayagam was a member of the Jaffna Youth Congress, Jaffna Association and Tamil Association. He joined the United National Party (UNP) in 1947 and was appointed to the Senate of Ceylon in 1949. He left the UNP because of its support for the Sinhala Only Act. He joined the All Ceylon Tamil Congress and served as president of its Jaffna branch until his death.

Kanaganayagam was awarded the Smith Mundt Scholarship in 1953 and studied in the USA.

Kanaganayagam was a director and vice president of the Hindu Board of Education.

== Later life ==
Kanaganayagam was heavily involved with the Hindu orphanage in Thirunelveli. He was a member of the senate of the University of Jaffna.

The civil war caused Kanaganayagam to move from Jaffna to his birth town of Sangarathai in 1984. He later moved to Australia to live with his daughter. He died on 15 May 1989 in Sydney.
