= K. S. Arulnandhy =

- Born: 25 March 1899; Uduvil, Ceylon
- Died: 30 July 1972 (aged 73)
- Education: Kantharodai English Institute; Jaffna Central College; Ceylon University College
- Occupation: Teacher

Kathirgamar Sadayar Arulnandhy (25 March 1899 – 30 July 1972) was a Ceylonese teacher and academic. He was the Deputy Director of Education from 1946 to 1950.

== Early life and family ==
Arulnandhy was born on 25 March 1899 in Uduvil in northern Ceylon. He was the son of Kathirgamar and Theivanai. He was educated at Kantharodai English Institute (now Skandavarodaya College) and Jaffna Central College. He passed the Cambridge Local Examinations with distinction and honours. After school Arulnandhy enrolled on a science teacher course.

Arulnandhy married Sakuntala, daughter of Suppiramaniam from Point Pedro. They had three sons (Mahendrarajah, Dr Puveendran and Thavendran) and five daughters (Maruneekiyar, Kamalasany, Satkunadevi, Mangaldevi and Chithradevi).

== Career ==
After completing his science teacher course Arulnandhy was appointed science master at Hartley College in 1920. He then went to Ceylon University College from where he graduated with a first class degree in science. In 1923 he was appointed Assistant Inspector of Schools. In 1929 he went to the UK where he obtained a teaching diploma from the University of London and a MSc degree in psychology. On returning to Ceylon he was promoted to Assistant Director of Education and then Deputy Director of Education in 1946. He retired from the Education Department in 1950 was appointed lecturer in education at the University of Ceylon. Arulnandhy served on a number of examination boards.

== Death ==
Arulnandhy died on 30 July 1972 aged 73.
