= David Raitt Robertson Burt =

Scottish zoologist

David Raitt Robertson Burt FRSE FLS FZS (1899–1983) was a Scottish zoologist with strong links to Ceylon. St Andrews University’s Burt Memorial Lecture is named after him. He is also credited with mounting the Bell Pettigrew Museum collection in the Zoology Department.

== Life ==
He was born in Kirkcaldy, Fife, on 19 June 1899. He attended Kirkcaldy High School.

In the First World War he joined the Black Watch and reached the rank of Second Lieutenant. He was not discharged until 1919.

In 1924 he moved to Ceylon to lecture in Zoology at University College, Ceylon. He was promoted to Professor of Zoology in 1939. In 1946 he returned to Scotland to lecture at St Andrews University. His students included the marine biologist Norman Tebble FRSE.

In 1930 he was elected a Fellow of the Royal Society of Edinburgh, his proposer being, amongst others, D’Arcy Wentworth Thompson. St Andrews University awarded him an Honorary Doctorate (DSc) in 1976.

He died at home in St Andrews on 8 May 1983.

== Family ==
He married Margherita Brunskill in 1931. They had two sons, Dr. James Robertson Burt (1933 - 1991) and Dr. Michael (Mick) David Brunskill Burt (1938-2014), one daughter (Susan Eileen Margaret Burt, b. 1942) and 11 grandchildren.
