= Vincent Thamotheram =

Sri Lankan judge

Puisne Justice of the Supreme Court of Sri Lanka
- In office 1970–1980

Personal details
- Born: 12 October 1915
- Died: 25 October 1997 (aged 82) Noble Park, Victoria, Australia
- Education: Jaffna Central College; St. Thomas' College; Ceylon University College; Ceylon Law College
- Profession: Lawyer
- Ethnicity: Sri Lankan Tamil

Vincent Thambinayagam Thamotheram (12 October 1915 – 25 October 1997) was a Sri Lankan lawyer, judge and writer. He was a crown counsel, Commissioner of Assize and Supreme Court judge.

== Early life and family ==
Thamotheram was born on 12 October 1915. He was the son of Gate Mudaliyar N. N. Thamotheram. He was educated at Jaffna Central College
St. Thomas' College. After school he entered Ceylon University College and graduated with a BA degree. He then joined Ceylon Law College and passed out as an advocate.

Thamotheram married Baladevi, daughter of Kanagasabai. They had a son, Nirmal Nandakumar, and three daughters, Vasantha, Chandira and Manjula.

== Career ==
Thamotheram was called to the bar in 1942. He joined the Attorney-General's Department. He was a crown counsel from 1944 to 1968. He acted as Solicitor General. He was also appointed Commissioner of Assize. He was appointed Supreme Court judge in 1970. He served on the Judicial Service Commission. He retired in 1980.

== Later life ==
After the Black July riots that killed thousands of Sri Lankans, Thamotheram moved to Australia in 1983. He was called to the bar in Australia in 1984.

Thamotheram died in Noble Park, Victoria on 25 October 1997, at the age of 82.
