= K. Kanapathypillai =

Sri Lankan Tamil academic and author (1902–1968)

Professor K. Kanapathypillai
- Born: 2 July 1902
- Died: 1968
- Education: Velauthar School; Hartley College; Ceylon University College; Annamalai University; University of London
- Occupation: Academic

Professor Kandasamypillai Kanapathypillai (2 July 1902 – 1968) was a leading Ceylon Tamil academic, author and head of the Department of Tamil at the University of Ceylon, Peradeniya for 18 years.

== Early life and family ==
Kanapathypillai was born on 2 July 1902. He was from Puloly in northern Ceylon. He was educated at Velauthar School and Hartley College. After school he joined the Ceylon University College from where he graduated with a First Class Honours BA degree in Sanskrit. He then went to Annamalai University in India to study Tamil, obtaining the vidvan title. He gained a Phd from the University of London after producing a thesis on Chola inscriptions in 1935.

== Career ==
Returning to Ceylon, Kanapathypillai was appointed Lecturer of Tamil at University of Ceylon, becoming Professor of Tamil in 1948. He was appointed head of the Department of Tamil at the university in 1947, succeeding Swami Vipulananda. He held that position until his retirement in 1965.

Kanapathypillai wrote a number of books including dramas.

In his later years as Professor of Tamil at Peradeniya, he made valuable contributions in the field of Sri Lankan Tamil epigraphy. At a time when there was no trained Tamil epigraphist to decipher, edit and publish the many ancient Tamil inscriptions in Sri Lanka, Kanapathypillai undertook this task and published articles on the Tamil inscriptions from Makanai, Moragahawela and Panduvasnuvara in the 1960 and 1962 issues of the University of Ceylon Review. He created a new interest in this field and inspired his students to continue this work after his retirement.
