= B. J. C. Perera =

Sri Lankan pediatrician

- Occupation: Pediatrician
- Title: Doctor

B. J. C. Perera is a Sri Lankan pediatrician. He is the Editor-in-Chief of Sri Lanka Journal of Bio-Medical Informatics.

== Early life ==
B. J. C. Perera was born in Wadduwa, Sri Lanka on 14 July 1947, the son of Victor Perera and Rose Perera.

== Personal life ==
Perera married Dr. Sarojini Perera in 1975. Currently, they reside in Rajagiriya, Sri Lanka. They have a daughter, Ruth Maneesha and three grandchildren, Joshua, Malaika and Jaydon.

== Education ==
Perera had his primary education at De Mazenod College, Kandana up to Grade 8. He proceeded to St Peter's College, Colombo. He wrote his Advanced Level Exam in 1964. He enrolled at the Faculty of Medicine, Colombo in 1965 and qualified with MBBS (Ceylon) 2nd Class Honours in 1970. Perera had further Postgraduate Education in Sri Lanka as well as the UK.

== Career ==
He was the first President of the Sri Lanka College of Paediatricians, He was the founding president of the Respiratory Diseases Study Group of Sri Lanka, founding president of the Childhood Respiratory Study Circle of Sri Lanka, National Consultant, Programme for control of Acute Respiratory Infections of the Ministry of Health, Chairman Board of Study in Paediatrics of The Postgraduate Institute of Medicine, Founding Member of The Board of Study in Sports Medicine of the Postgraduate Institute of Medicine and Member of the Country Coordinating Mechanism (CCM) of the Global Fund to fight AIDS, Tuberculosis and Malaria (GFATM).

== Publications ==
=== Books ===
- Modern Child Health Care: A Guide to Parents

== Awards ==
- ."Outstanding Paediatrician of Asia" Award by the Asia Pacific Paediatric Association in 2007.
