= Norman Tebble =

British marine biologist

Dr Norman Tebble FRSE FIB (1924–1998) was a 20th-century British marine biologist.

== Life ==
He was born in East Sleekburn in Northumberland on 17 August 1924, the son of Robert soulsby Tebble and his wife, Jane Ann Graham. He was educated at Bedlington Grammar School.

He entered St Andrews University under the University Short Course Scheme, which offered a university place linked to military service. In late 1943 he joined the Royal Air Force Volunteer Reserve and served as a pilot in Burma and India.

In 1946 he returned to St Andrews University to study palaeontology with a focus upon foraminifera. From 1946 he came under the tutelage of Prof David Raitt Robertson Burt. Burt became a lifelong friend and pushed Tebble towards museum work. Burt obtained a summer position for Tebble at the Shell Oil Company in The Hague in the Netherlands. He became an expert in the taxonomy of foraminifera. He gained his BSc in 1950.

In 1950 he became Assistant Scientific Officer at the British Natural History Museum in London. In 1958 he was given the John Murray Travelling Scholarship and went to the Scripps Institution of Oceanography based at La Jolla in California. In 1961, back in London, he was promoted to Curator of the Mollusc Collection of the Museum. This was somewhat reluctant it seems as it was not his field of interest. His alma mater awarded him a doctorate (DSc) in 1968.

In 1968 he moved to Oxford as both lecturer in marine biology at Oxford University plus Curator of the university's zoological collection. Oxford gave him an honorary MA in 1971. In 1971 he received a dramatic promotion and transferred to Edinburgh as Director of the Royal Scottish Museum on Chambers Street (now the Museum of Scotland). In 1975 he was one of the founders of the National Museum of Flight at East Fortune, east of Edinburgh.

In 1976 he was elected a Fellow of the Royal Society of Edinburgh. His proposers were David Raitt Robertson Burt, James Munro Dodd, James A. MacDonald and John F. Allen. In 1977 he served as President of the Museums Association (UK).

He retired in 1984 and died in North Berwick on 23 July 1998.

== Family ==
In 1954 he married fellow zoologist Mary Olivia Archer, who he had met through his work in the Natural History Museum.

== Publications ==
- The Polychaete Fauna of the Gold Coast (1955)
- British Bivalve Seashells (1966)
- Polychaetes from Scottish Waters (1985)
