= P. Sriskandarajah =

Ceylonese judge

Puisne Justice of the Supreme Court of Ceylon
- In office 1962–1967

Personal details
- Born: 8 February 1905
- Died: 24 December 1968 (aged 63)
- Education: Ceylon University College; Ceylon Law College
- Profession: Lawyer
- Ethnicity: Ceylon Tamil

Ponnuduraiswamy Sriskandarajah (8 February 1905 – 24 December 1968) was a leading Ceylonese lawyer and judge. He was a magistrate, District Judge and Supreme Court judge.

== Early life and family ==
Sriskandarajah was born on 8 February 1905. He was the son of Ponnuduraiswamy and Katpakam, daughter of Murugupillai, vidane of Thondaimanaru in northern province of Ceylon. He was educated at Udupiddy American Mission College, Jaffna College, Jaffna Central College and Ananda College from where he matriculated in the first division. After school he entered Ceylon University College and graduated with a BA degree He then joined Ceylon Law College and passed out as an advocate.

Sriskandarajah married Kanmani, daughter of M. Visuvalingam. They had two sons (Sribavan and Srigugan) and two daughters (Suseela and Indra). Suseela married A. T. Moorthy, later High Commissioner of Sri Lanka to the United Kingdom.

== Career ==
Sriskandarajah was called to the bar in 1932. He joined the judicial service in 1938 and served in a number of positions: magistrate in Colombo, District Judge in Batticaloa (1947), District Judge in Jaffna (1954) and Commissioner of Assize (1960). He was a Supreme Court judge between 1962 and 1967.

== Later life ==
After retirement Sriskandarajah was involved in social and religious activities. He was president of the All Ceylon Hindu Congress from 1965 until his death.

Sriskandarajah died on 24 December 1968 at the age of 63.
