= A. W. Mailvaganam =

Ceylon Tamil physicist and academic

Professor Vidya Jyothi A. W. Mailvaganam OBE
- Born: 13 November 1906
- Died: 25 March 1987 (aged 80)
- Education: Jaffna Central College; St. Benedict's College, Colombo; Royal College, Colombo; Ceylon University College; Emmanuel College, Cambridge
- Occupation: Academic

Vidya Jyothi Arumugam Wisvalingam Mailvaganam, OBE (13 November 1906 – 25 March 1987) was a leading Ceylon Tamil physicist, academic and the dean of the Faculty of Science, University of Ceylon.

== Early life and family ==
Mailvaganam was born on 16 November 1906. He was the son of Arumugam Wisvalingam from Suthumalai in northern Ceylon. He was educated at Jaffna Central College, St. Benedict's College, Colombo and Royal College, Colombo. After school he joined Ceylon University College, graduating in 1923 with first class BSc honours degree in science. He then joined Emmanuel College, Cambridge in 1924, obtaining an MA honours degree in Natural Science Tripos in 1928. He received a PhD from Cambridge in 1938.

Mailvaganam had a son, Gajanandan Nandakumar. Mailvaganam was a devout Hindu and worshipped at the temple in Bambalapitiya.

== Career ==
After university Mailvaganam joined the Ceylon University College as a lecturer in physics in 1932. He became a professor of physics in 1939 and served Dean of the Faculty of Science, University of Ceylon between 1948 and 1954. He acted as vice chancellor on a number of occasions when Nicholas Attygalle was vice chancellor. He retired in 1966.

In the 1949 Birthday Honours Mailvaganam was made an Officer of the Order of the British Empire. He received the Vidya Jyothi honour in 1985.

Mailvaganam was president of the Ceylon Association for the Advancement of Science and a member of the University Grants Commission and Board of Governors of the Institute of Fundamental Studies. He received honorary DSc degrees from the University of Colombo (December 1980) and University of Jaffna. The University of Colombo has named one of its annual awards after Mailvaganam.

== Death ==
Mailvaganam died on 25 March 1987.
