= Methodist Church in Sri Lanka =

Christian denomination

Methodist Church of Sri Lanka
- Classification: Protestant (Methodist)
- Associations: World Council of Churches, Christian Conference of Asia, National Christian Council of Sri Lanka, World Methodist Council
- Members: 32,000 (2010)
- Tertiary institutions: Methodist College, Colombo
- Official website: methodistsrilanka.org

The Methodist Church of Sri Lanka (Sinhala: ශ්‍රි ලංකා මෙතොදිස්ත සභාව Sri Lanka Methodista Sabhava) (Tamil language: இலங்கை மெதடிஸ்த திருச்சபை Illangai Methadistha Thiruchabai) is a Protestant Christian denomination in Sri Lanka. Its headquarters is in Colombo and was established on 29 June 1814. It is a member of the World Council of Churches, the Christian Conference of Asia, the National Christian Council of Sri Lanka and the World Methodist Council.

== History ==
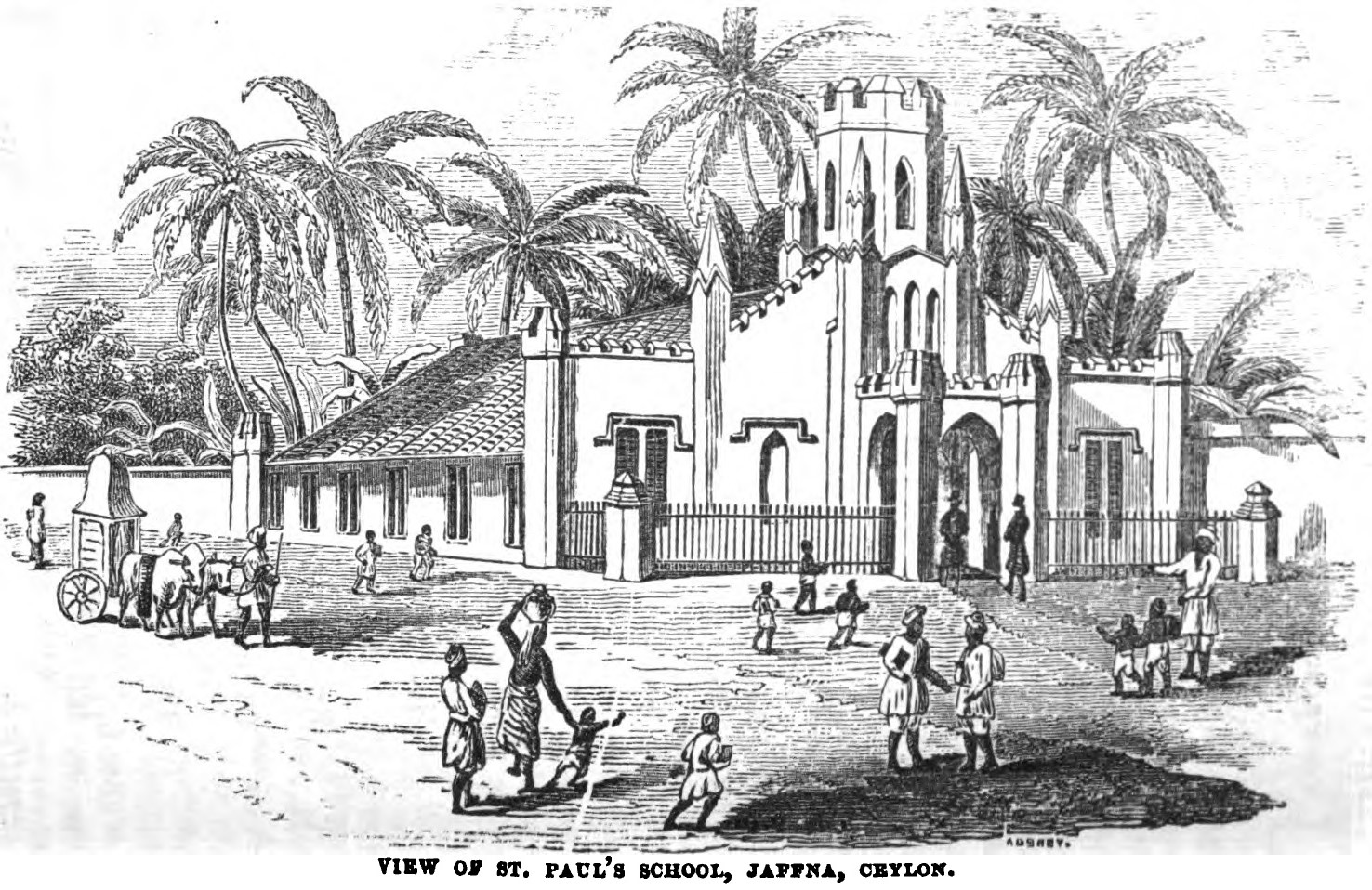
View of St. Paul's School, Jaffna, Ceylon (p.18, 1849)

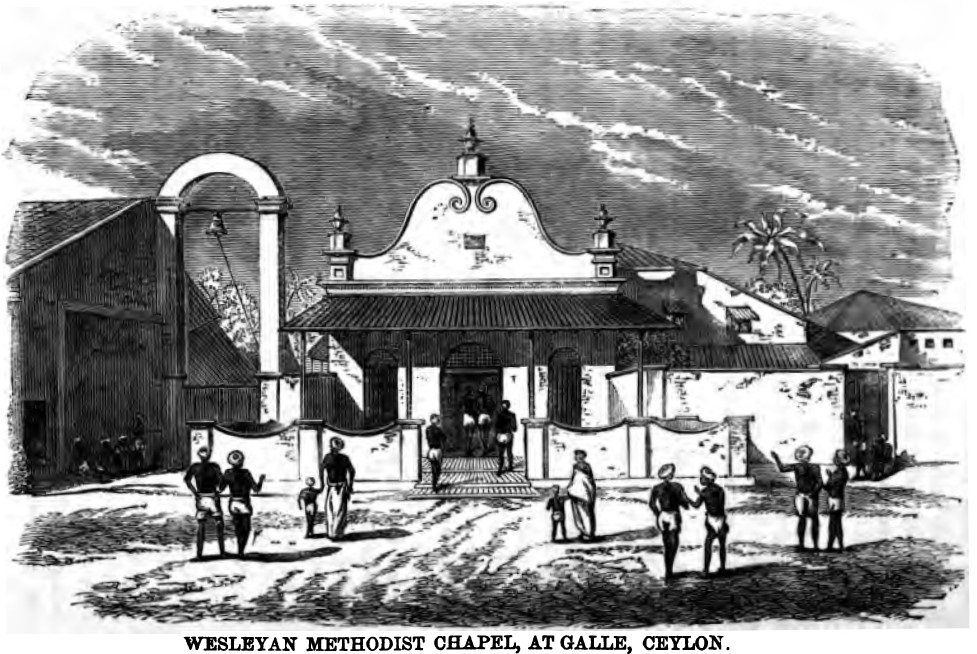
Wesleyan Methodist Chapel, at Galle, Ceylon (1868)

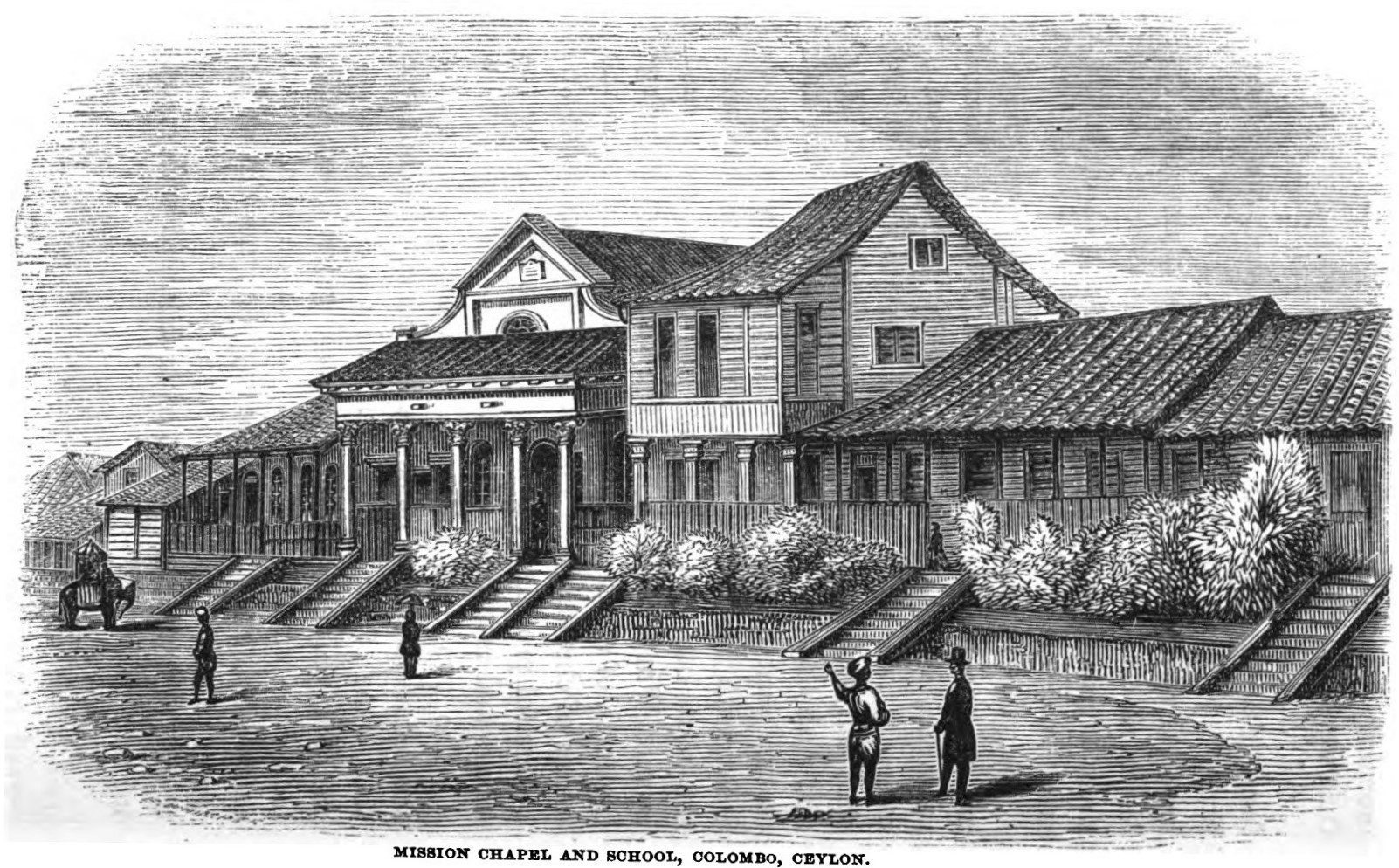
Mission Chapel and School, Colombo, Ceylon (p.168, November 1865, XXII)

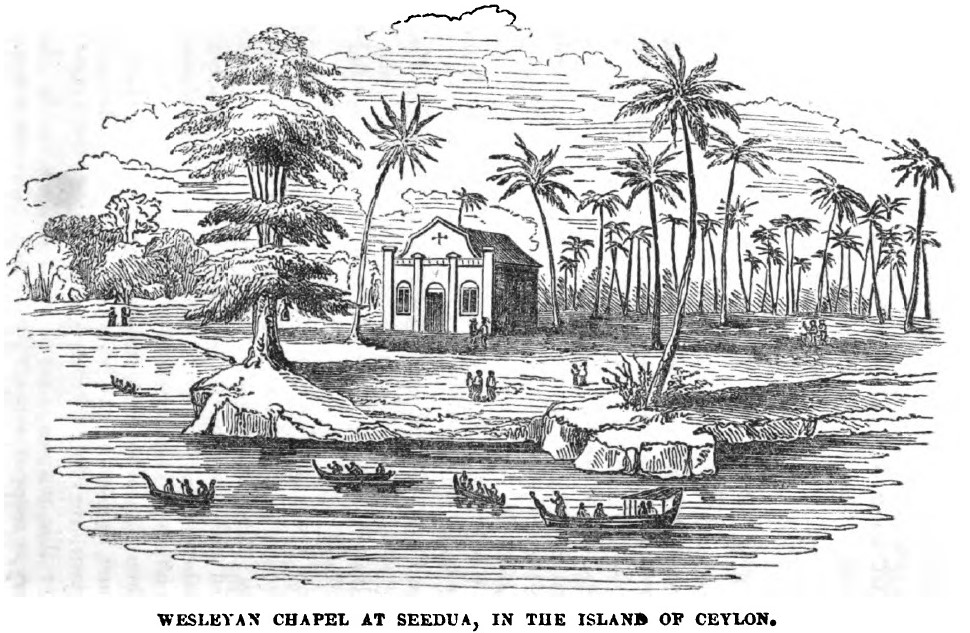
Wesleyan Chapel at Seedua, in the Island of Ceylon (1846)

Thomas Coke, the right-hand man of the Reverend John Wesley, was chiefly responsible for the overseas mission to Ceylon (now Sri Lanka) that set sail from Portsmouth harbor on 30 December 1813. During the voyage, Coke became ill, died, and was buried at sea on 3 May 1814. James Lynch, Thomas Hall Squance, William Ault, George Erskine and Benjamin Clough arrived in Galle on 29 June 1814. Squance, Clough, and Lynch made it to the Galle Harbour, and the boat carrying Ault and Erskine with their personal effects drifted towards Weligama and they landed there early next day.

The missionaries travelled to different parts of Ceylon, with Squance and Lynch to Jaffna, Ault to Batticaloa, Erskine to Matara, and Clough remaining in Galle. Harvard who remained in Bombay due to family circumstances came to Galle in early 1815 and was posted to Colombo and Clough too joined him leaving Galle to be looked after by Erskine. In mid-1815, they purchased a portion of land on Dam Street and built a chapel that still stands there today as Methodist Church, Pettah, the oldest Methodist Church in Asia. They later started a children's Sunday school and a printing press in Colombo. Rev. Harvard, a printer by profession, supervised the work and started printing books for children. Meanwhile, a chapel called ‘The Wesleyan Mission House’ was completed and opened for worship in December 1816. James Lynch travelled to Nagapattinam (India) in a small boat and established Methodism in Madras on 1817.

In spite of attitudes against the education of woman at the time, in 1834, the missionaries established the Vembadi Girls' High School.

Along with Pandit Arumuga Navalar, Peter Percival translated the Bible into Tamil. He also wrote the Anglo-Tamil Dictionary (1838), which together with his A Collection of Proverbs in Tamil with their translation in English was published by the Jaffna Book Society. These were two of the earliest Tamil books printed, alongside those by the American Ceylon Mission. His Land of the Veda: India briefly described in some of its aspects, Physical, Social, Intellectual & Moral was published in 1854.

The missionaries worked with children throughout the country, as well as established homes for orphans and vocational training, such as those at Galle, Badulla, Diyatalawa, and Thummodera. This work continued, and, in the twentieth century, homes were established in Trincomalee, Chenkalady, Puthuyugam, and Nilavely. Catering to the emerging need to support the children of working parents, the Methodist Church founded day care centers and nurseries in Welimada, Moratumulla, Angulana, Panadura, and Maradana.

Young girls travelling into cities for higher education and employment lacked safe accommodation, and so, with the support of local churches, women's hostels were set up in Colombo, Maradana, Moor Road, Badulla, and Katunayake. Elders' homes, for the support of the aged, were established in Badulla, Wellawatte, Moratumulla, and Putter, and cared for by the Methodist Women’s Fellowship.

Many of the missionaries were involved with printing, with Harvard, Squance, Callaway, Spence, Hardy, and Gogerly all being printers by trade. Benjamin Clough published an English to Sinhala dictionary in 1821 and a Sinhala to English one in 1830. He also published the first Pali grammar and vocabulary book in English, and translated and printed sermons in Sinhala. The Wesleyan Press continued to print and publish scholarly books produced by missionaries such the Reverend D. J. Gorgerly and Percival. The press also printed the Sinhala Bibles for the Ceylon Bible Society Auxiliary for many years.

The Methodist Church, known for some noted educators, set up many schools in Sri Lanka, including:

- Richmond College, was started in 1814 as The Galle School – the first Wesleyan Methodist school in Sri Lanka and Asia, and was converted to a High School in 1876 and re-named Richmond College in 1882;
- Matara Janadipathi Vidyalaya, founded as Matara Fort Methodist College in August 1814, and renamed in 1960;
- Methodist Central College, Batticaloa, founded in 1814;
- Newstead Girls College, in Negombo;founded in 1815-1816
- Jaffna Central College founded in 1816 by James Lynch as Jaffna Wesleyan English School, The school was renamed Jaffna Central School in 1834;
- Rippon College, founded in 1817 as the female Department of the Galle School was the Richmond Hill Girls Boarding School was part of Richmond College until early 20th century;
- Hartley College was founded as Wesleyan Mission Central School, established in 1818 by Percival and renamed in 1896;
- Vincent Girls' High School, started in 1820 and upgraded in 1895;
- Point Pedro Methodist Girls College, the first Girl’s Boarding School, established in 1823;
- Methodist College, Colombo, founded as Kollupitiya Girls High School in 1866, and renamed in 1915;
- Wesley College, established in 1874;
- Girls' High School, Kandy, founded in 1879;
- Southlands College, Galle started in 1885;
- Kingswood College, Kandy, founded in 1891 by L. E. Blaze;
- MR/ Malimbada Sri Sumedha Maha Vidyalaya was founded as Batathumbe Methodist College in 1894, renamed in 1912.
- Vembadi Girls High School, founded in 1897;
- Wesley High School, Kalmunai;
- Moratumulla High School;
- Katunayake High School;
- Methodist Girls' College, Trincomalee;
- Highlands College, Hatton

However, in 1961, as many as 178 Methodist-run schools were converted by the government from "government assisted" schools to "government" schools. Only two schools, Wesley College, Colombo and Methodist College, Colombo, remained under the management of the church.

Church leaders began medical work in Welimada in 1887. Their efforts developed into Wiseman's Hospital, a small women's hospital, in 1895. A small children’s hospital was also set up at Happy Valley in Uva. These facilities were built at a vital time of need, as there were not any government hospitals. Medical work was done in Batticaloa, Kalmunai, and Trincomalee. A missionary, Gertrude Nettleship, founded a hospital in Puthur in 1898, which was later renamed St. Luke’s Methodist Hospital, Puthur. This is the only of the Methodists' early hospitals still in use.

Centers for vocational training were established, including the Jeevodhayam Farm, Polwatte Pottery Project, B.I.H. Electronics, and the City Mission Community Projects.

In 2006, due to the ongoing war and prolonged state of emergency, the Church established a Justice and Peace Desk to keep track of the human rights situation and promote peace. The Church's Children’s Desk has attempted to promote the welfare of children in Sri Lanka.

In June 1963, the British Conference passed a Resolution granting autonomy to the Methodist Church in Ceylon. The Deed of Foundation of the Ceylon Conference was signed in the Kollupitiya Methodist Church on 18 June 1964. Upon its signing, the President of the British Conference said “I declare the Methodist Church of Ceylon to be now inaugurated for the purpose of witnessing to the good news of Jesus Christ and spreading of Scriptural Holiness throughout the land and to the ends of the earth.” He then inducted Rev. Fred S. De Silva as the first President of the Methodist Church of Ceylon. The Governor-general of Ceylon was present at the Service.

The Methodist Church of Sri Lanka celebrated its bicentenary on 29 June 2014 with a National Thanksgiving Service at the Cathedral of Christ the Living Saviour. More than 10,000 Methodist members from all over Sri Lanka attended.

== See also ==
- Christianity in Sri Lanka

Rev.Robert Arunasalem Barnes-Batticaloa 1877-1913
