= Chulipuram =

Chulipuram சுழிபுரம் චුලිපුරම්
- Village
- Location within Northern Province
- Coordinates: 9°45′37.10″N 79°56′33.50″E
- Country: Sri Lanka
- Province: Northern
- District: Jaffna
- DS Division: Valikamam West

Chulipuram is a village in Jaffna District, Sri Lanka. Its area is 7.5 km^{2}. It is located about 16 kilometers north-west of Jaffna town along the Karainagar-Manipay-Jaffna road AB17.

The Victoria College, Chulipuram is the main icon of Chulipuram.
