= List of Royal College, Colombo alumni =

This is a list of alumni of Royal College, Colombo in Sri Lanka, often called "Old Royalists".

One comes across fellow Royalists in varying situations in life;
instantly a rapport is established for one knows the other
— assumes his qualities and understands his character.

— Lalith Athulathmudali

== Heads of State ==
Name	Notability	References
J.R Jayawardene	President (1978–1989), Prime Minister of Sri Lanka (1977–1978), member of Parliament (1947–1956, 1960–1976, 1977–1978), member of State Council (1943–1947)	
Ranil Wickremasinghe	President (2022–2024), Prime Minister of Sri Lanka (1993–1994, 2001–2004, 2015–2019, 2022–2022), member of Parliament (1977–2020, 2021–2022)	
Maumoon Abdul Gayoom	President of the Maldives (1978–2008)	
Muhammad Fareed Didi	Sultan of the Maldives (1954–1968)	

== Heads of Government ==
Name	Notability	References
Sir John Kotalawela	Prime Minister of Ceylon (1953–1956), member of Parliament for Dodangaslanda (1947–1959), member of State Council (1931–1947)	
Dinesh Gunawardena	Prime Minister (2022–2024), member of Parliament (1983–1994, 2000–Present)	

== Royalty ==
Name	Notability	References
Prince Henveyru Ganduvaru Manippulu	Crown Prince of the Maldives	
Prince Hassan Farid Didi	Minister for Home Affairs, Minister for Finance, Minister of State and Plenipotentiary Representative in Ceylon	

== Viceregal ==
Name	Class year	Notability	Reference(s)
Sir James Peiris		Acting Governor of Ceylon (1925), Vice-President Legislative Council of Ceylon (1924–1940)	
C. Nagalingam		Acting Governor-General of Ceylon (1954), Acting Chief Justice of Ceylon (1954), Supreme Court Judge (1947–1958), Attorney General (1946–1947)	
David de Kretser		Governor of Victoria (2006–2011)	

== Prominent figures in the Independence Movement ==
Name	Class year	Notability	Reference(s)
Anagarika Dharmapala		Buddhist revivalist and leader of the Sri Lankan independence movement	
Sir James Peiris		Prominent political leader, first Vice President of the Legislative Council and the first Ceylonese Acting Governor	(note: also listed in Legislators)
F. R. Senanayake		Leader of the Sri Lankan independence movement and member of Legislative Council of Ceylon (note: also listed in Legislators)	
E. W. Perera		Senator, member of Legislative Council and State Council	(note: also listed in Legislators)
Sir Ponnambalam Ramanathan		Prominent political leader, Solicitor General of Ceylon and first member to be elected to the Legislative Council	(note: also listed in Legislators and Civil servants)
Sir Ponnambalam Arunachalam		Prominent political leader of Ceylon, member of the Executive Council and Legislative Council	(note: also listed in Legislators)
Charles Edgar Corea			(also listed in Legislators)
Henry Pedris		CTG officer and socialite executed by the British	
Charles Alwis Hewavitharana		Prominent leader in the independence movement	(note: also listed in Medicine)
Armand de Souza		leading editorialist who campaigned for democratisation of the legislature	

== National politics ==
=== Heads of Legislature ===
Name	Class year	Notability	Reference(s)
Sir Forester Obeysekera		Speaker of the State Council of Ceylon (1934–1935), member Legislative Council (1924–1931)	
Sir Gerard Wijeyekoon		First President of the Senate of Ceylon (1947–1953)	
Sir Frank Gunasekera		First Deputy President of the Senate of Ceylon (1947–1951)	
Sir Nicholas Attygalle		President of the Senate of Ceylon (1953–1960), first Ceylonese Vice-Chancellor University of Ceylon (1954–1967), President Ceylon Medical Council	
Sir Cyril de Zoysa		President of the Senate of Ceylon (1960–1965)	
Abeyratne Ratnayaka		President of the Senate of Ceylon (1965–1971), member of Parliament for Wattegama (1947–1956, 1960–1965)	
Shirley Corea		Speaker of Parliament (1967–1970), member of Parliament for Chilaw (1952–1970)	
Anura Bandaranaike		Speaker of Parliament (2000–2001), member of Parliament for Nuwara Eliya-Maskeliya (1977–1989)	
Sir Razik Fareed		Deputy Speaker of Parliament (1967–1968)	
Piyankara Jayaratne		Deputy Speaker of Parliament (2008–2010), member of Parliament for Puttalam District (2008–2024)	
Ranjith Siyambalapitiya		Deputy Speaker of Parliament (2020–2024), member of Parliament for Kegalle District (2000–2024)	

=== Ministers and legislators ===
==== Current ====
Name	Notability	Reference(s)
Sajith Premadasa	Leader of the Opposition, Member of Parliament and former Cabinet Minister	
Rauff Hakeem	Member of Parliament and former Cabinet Minister	
Harsha de Silva	Member of Parliament and former Deputy Minister of Foreign Affairs	

==== Former ====
Pre-Independence

- Sir James Peiris JP – Vice President of the Legislative Council and first Ceylonese Acting Governor (note: also listed in Prominent figures in the Independence Movement)
- Sir Richard Morgan – first Ceylonese member of the Governor's Executive Council and Member of the Legislative Council (note: also listed in Judges)
- Sir Ponnambalam Arunachalam CCS – member of the Executive Council and Legislative Council (note: also listed in Prominent figures in the Independence Movement)
- Sir Ponnambalam Ramanathan KCMG KC – first elected Ceylonese representative unofficial member of the Legislative Council (note: also listed in Prominent figures in the Independence Movement and Civil Servants)
- Sir Hector van Cuylenburg – first elected Burgher representative unofficial member of the Legislative Council
- Sir Marcus Fernando FRCP – member of the Executive Council and Legislative Council (note: also listed in Medicine)
- Sir Arunachalam Mahadeva KCMG – former Minister Home Affaires of the State Council and member of the Legislative Council (note: also listed in Diplomats)
- Sir Bandara Panabokke Adigar – First Minister of Health in the State Council and a member of the Legislative Council (note: also listed in Diplomats)
- Sir Forester Obeysekera – Speaker of the State Council and a member of the Legislative Council (note: also listed in Heads of legislature)
- Sir Susantha de Fonseka KBE – Deputy Speaker of the State Council (note: also listed in Diplomats)
- Sir Harry Dias Bandaranaike – former Member of the Legislative Council, acting Chief Justice of the Supreme Court of Ceylon and first Ceylonese Barrister (note: also listed in Judges)
- Sir Muthu Coomaraswamy – former Member of the Legislative Council
- Sir Henry de Mel CBE – former Member of the Legislative Council (note: also listed in Industrialists)
- Colonel T. G. Jayewardene JP CLI – former Member of the State Council (note: also listed in Military)
- E. W. Perera – former Member of the State Council and the Legislative Council (note: also listed in Prominent figures in the Independence Movement)
- Donald Obeyesekere – former Member of the State Council and the Legislative Council (note: also listed in Sportsmen and sports administrators)
- Justice Sir Thomas Garvin KC – former ex-officio Member of the Legislative Council (note: also listed in Judges and lawyers)
- Justice Maas Thajoon Akbar KC – former ex-officio Member of the Legislative Council (note: also listed in Judges and lawyers)
- C. E. Corea – former Member of the Legislative Council, President of the Ceylon National Congress (1924) (note: also listed in Prominent figures in the Independence Movement)
- Charles Ambrose Lorensz – former Member of the Legislative Council (note: also listed in Judges)
- T M Sabaratnam – former Member of the Legislative Council
- James De Alwis – former Member of the Legislative Council (note: also listed in Poets)
- K. Balasingam – former Member of the Executive Council and Legislative Council
- J. R. Weinman – former Member of the Legislative Council (note: also listed in Judges)
- A. J. R. de Soysa – former Member of the Legislative Council of Ceylon
- C. H. Z. Fernando – former Member of the Legislative Council
- W. M. Rajapakse – former Member of the Legislative Council
- S. W. Dassenaike - former Member of the State Council

Post-Independence

- E. B. Wikramanayake QC – former Senator and Cabinet Minister of Justice
- A. P. Jayasuriya – former Senator, Cabinet Minister of Health and Member of Parliament
- Sarath Wijesinghe – former Senator, Cabinet Minister of Nationalized Services and Senator
- Justin Kotelawala – former Senator and Member of the State Council
- Sir Razik Fareed OBE JP – former Cabinet Minister of Trade, Deputy Speaker, Member of Parliament, the Senate and the State Council (note: also listed in Diplomats)
- Somasundaram Nadesan QC – former Senator (note: also listed in Lawyers)
- V.R. Schockman – former Senator (note: also listed in Mayors, Sportsmen and sports administrators)
- R.S.V. Poulier CBE CCS – former Senator and Member of Parliament
- L. L. Hunter CMG - former Parliamentary Secretary, Senator and Member of Parliament
- C. Coomaraswamy CCS – former Senator (note: also listed in Civil servants, Diplomats)
- Lalith Athulathmudali PC – former Cabinet Minister of National Security & Defence, Minister of Agriculture, Minister of Education, Member of Parliament
- Anura Bandaranaike – former Cabinet Minister of Foreign Affairs, Tourism, Industry, Investment & National Heritage, Leader of the Opposition, Member of Parliament (note: also listed in Heads of legislature)
- Major E. A. Nugawela CLI – former Cabinet Minister of Education (of the first cabinet 1947), Member of Parliament & State Council
- Cathiravelu Sittampalam CCS – former Cabinet Minister of Posts and Telecommunications (of the first cabinet 1947), Member of Parliament
- Abeyratne Ratnayaka – former Cabinet Minister of Food and Cooperatives (of the first cabinet 1947), Member of Parliament & State Council
- Felix R. Dias Bandaranaike – former Cabinet Minister of Finance, Public Administration, Local Government, Home Affairs, Justice, Member of Parliament
- Deshamanya Nissanka Wijeyeratne CCS – former Cabinet Minister of Education, Higher Education & Justice, Member of Parliament (note: also listed in Civil servants)
- Colvin R de Silva – former Cabinet Minister of Plantation Industries and Constitutional Affairs, Member of Parliament
- Tyronne Fernando PC – former Cabinet Minister of Foreign Affairs, Member of Parliament (note: also listed in Viceregal, Diplomats)
- Anil Moonesinghe – former Cabinet Minister of Communications, Deputy Speaker, Member of Parliament (note: also listed in Diplomats)
- Pieter Keuneman – former Cabinet Minister of Housing and Local Government, Member of Parliament
- Cyril Mathew – former Cabinet Minister of Industries and Scientific Affairs, Member of Parliament
- Stanly de Zoysa – former Cabinet Minister of Finance, Member of Parliament
- medical doctor Ranjit Atapattu – former Cabinet Minister of Health, Member of Parliament
- C.V. Gunaratne – former Cabinet Minister Industrial of Development, Member of Parliament
- R.G. Senanayake – former Cabinet Minister of Trade, Member of Parliament holding two concurrent seats from two continuances
- P.B. Bulankulama Dissawa – former Minister of Lands, Member of Parliament
- Milinda Moragoda – former Cabinet Minister of Justice and Law Reforms, Member of Parliament
- Deshamanya J.P. Obeyesekere III – former Acting Cabinet Minister of Health, Finance, and Member of Parliament (note: also listed in Aviation)
- Gamini Jayasuriya – former Cabinet Minister of Health, Agriculture Development; Member of Parliament
- Indika Gunawardena – former Cabinet Minister of Fisheries, Member of Parliament
- George Rajapakse – former Cabinet Minister of Fisheries, Member of Parliament
- P. B. Bulankulame Dissava – former Cabinet Minister of Land, Land Development and Member of Parliament
- Mano Wijeyeratne – former Minister of Plantation Services, Non-Cabinet Minister of Enterprise Development, Member of Parliament
- Susil Moonesinghe – former Chief Minister of the Western Provincial Council, Member of Parliament (note: also listed in Local government and Diplomats)
- T. B. Panabokke – former Deputy Minister of Justice & Agriculture and Member of Parliament (note: also listed in Diplomats)
- Wijaya Dahanayake – former Deputy Minister of Public Administration and Home Affairs and Member of Parliament
- Mangala Moonesinghe – former Member of Parliament (note: also listed in Diplomats)
- H. Sri Nissanka KC – former Member of Parliament and one of the founders of the SLFP (note: also listed in Lawyers)
- Walwin de Silva CCS – former Member of Parliament (note: also listed in Civil servants)
- Arumugam Thondaman – former Cabinet Minister and Member of Parliament
- Malik Samarawickrama – former Cabinet Minister and Member of Parliament
- Mangala Samaraweera – former Cabinet Minister and Member of Parliament
- Ravi Karunanayake – former Cabinet Minister and Member of Parliament
- Sagala Ratnayaka – former Cabinet Minister and Member of Parliament
- D. M. Swaminathan – former Cabinet Minister and Member of Parliament
- Faiszer Musthapha – former Cabinet Minister and Member of Parliament
- Mohan Lal Grero – former State Minister and Member of Parliament
- Neelan Thiruchelvam – former Member of Parliament
- Wilmot A. Perera – former Member of Parliament (note: also listed in Diplomats)
- Ahmed Hussain Macan Markar – former Member of Parliament
- Arthur de Zoysa – former Member of Parliament
- J. A. Martenze – former Member of Parliament (note: also listed in Industrialists and corporate executives)
- Tissa Kapukotuwa – former Member of Parliament
- Murugesu Balasunderam – former Member of Parliament
- Gladwin Kotelawala MBE – former Member of Parliament
- Sajin Vass Gunawardena – former Member of Parliament
- Mohamed Latheef – former Member of the Maldivian Parliament

Name	Notability	Reference(s)
Dinesh Gunawardena	Prime Minister and Member of Parliament	
Mahindananda Aluthgamage	Member of Parliament and former Cabinet Minister of Agriculture	
Duminda Dissanayake	Member of Parliament and former Cabinet Minister of Irrigation	
Navin Dissanayake	Member of Parliament and former Cabinet Minister of Plantation Industries	
Vidura Wickremanayake	Member of Parliament and former State Minister of National heritage, rural arts	
Anuradha Jayaratne	Member of Parliament and former State Minister of Rural irrigation and tanks development	
Piyankara Jayaratne	Member of Parliament and former State Minister of Law and Order	
Dilan Perera	Member of Parliament and former State Minister of Highways	
Anupama Pasqual	Member of Parliament	
Nipuna Ranawaka	Member of Parliament	
Yadamini Gunawardena	Member of Parliament	
Lakshman Kiriella	Member of Parliament, former Cabinet Minister of Highways and Leader of the House	
Gayantha Karunathilaka	Member of Parliament and former Cabinet Minister of Media and Parliament Rehabilitation	
Kabir Hashim	Member of Parliament and former Cabinet Minister of Public Enterprise Development	
Piyankara Jayaratne	Member of Parliament and former State Minister of Law and Order	
Eran Wickramaratne	Member of Parliament and former Deputy Minister of State entrepreneurship (note: also listed in Industrialists)	
Harshana Rajakaruna	Member of Parliament	
Kavinda Jayawardena	Member of Parliament	
Mayantha Dissanayake	Member of Parliament	
Kins Nelson	Member of Parliament	
Imran Maharoof	Member of Parliament	
C. V. Wigneswaran	Member of Parliament	
M. A. Sumanthiran	Member of Parliament	
Gajendrakumar Ponnambalam	Member of Parliament	

== Judiciary ==
Chief Justices

- Miliani Sansoni – former Chief Justice of the Supreme Court of Ceylon
- Hugh Norman Gregory Fernando – former Chief Justice of the Supreme Court of Ceylon
- Parinda Ranasinghe – former Chief Justice of the Supreme Court of Sri Lanka
- Mohan Peiris PC – former Chief Justice of the Supreme Court of Sri Lanka (note: also listed in Lawyers)

Acting Chief Justices

- Sir Richard Morgan – former Acting Chief Justice of the Supreme Court of Ceylon (note: also listed in Legislators)
- Sir Harry Dias Bandaranaike – former Acting Chief Justice of the Supreme Court of Ceylon and first Ceylonese Barrister (note: also listed in Legislators)
- Sir Thomas Garvin KC – former Acting Chief Justice and Puisne Justice of the Supreme Court of Ceylon (note: also listed in Legislators and Lawyers)
- C. Nagalingam KC – former Acting Chief Justice and Puisne Justice of the Supreme Court of Ceylon (note: also listed in Viceregal)
- Eugene Reginald de Fonseka QC – former Acting Chief Justice and Puisne Justice of the Supreme Court of Ceylon
- S. W. B. Wadugodapitiya PC – former Acting Chief Justice and Puisne Justice of the Supreme Court of Sri Lanka

Puisne Justice of the Supreme Court

- Lucien Macull Dominic de Silva QC PC – former Puisne Justice of the Supreme Court of Ceylon and member of the Judicial Committee of the Privy Council
- Sir Thomas De Sampayo KC – former Puisne Justice of the Supreme Court of Ceylon
- Sri Lankabhimanya Christopher Weeramantry AM – former Vice President and Judge of the International Court of Justice, Puisne Justice of the Supreme Court of Sri Lanka
- Eugene Wilfred Jayewardene KC – former Puisne Justice of the Supreme Court of Ceylon
- John Adrian St. Valentine Jayewardene – former Puisne Justice of the Supreme Court of Ceylon
- Maas Thajoon Akbar KC – former Puisne Justice of the Supreme Court of Ceylon (note: also listed in Legislators and lawyers)
- Saleem Marsoof PC – Puisne Justice of the Supreme Court of Sri Lanka and Justice of Appeal of the Supreme Court of Fiji
- Oswald Leslie De Kretser II CMG – former Puisne Justice of the Supreme Court of Ceylon
- Oswald Leslie De Kretser III – former Puisne Justice of the Supreme Court of Ceylon
- Felix Reginald Dias Bandaranaike I – former Puisne Justice of the Supreme Court of Ceylon
- Felix Reginald Dias Bandaranaike II – former Puisne Justice of the Supreme Court of Ceylon
- Arthur Eric Keuneman KC – former Puisne Justice of the Supreme Court of Ceylon
- V. M. Fernando – former Puisne Justice of the Supreme Court of Ceylon
- T. S. Fernando QC – former Puisne Justice of the Supreme Court of Ceylon (note: also listed in Lawyers)
- F. H. B. Koch QC – former Puisne Justice of the Supreme Court of Ceylon
- V. Manicavasagar – former Puisne Justice of the Supreme Court of Ceylon, Chancellor of the University of Jaffna
- C. V. Vigneswaran PC – former Justice of the Supreme Court of Sri Lanka (note: also listed in Provincial Councilors)
- Asoka Wijetunga – former Puisne Justice of the Supreme Court of Sri Lanka
- P. Edussuriya – former Puisne Justice of the Supreme Court of Sri Lanka
- Anil Goonaratne – former Puisne Justice of the Supreme Court of Sri Lanka
- K. T. Chitrasiri – former Puisne Justice of the Supreme Court of Sri Lanka
- Prasanna Jayawardena PC – current Puisne Justice of the Supreme Court of Sri Lanka

Judges of the Court of Appeal of Sri Lanka

- Siva Selliah – former Judge of the Court of Appeal of Sri Lanka
- Eric Basnayake – former Judge of the Court of Appeal of Sri Lanka and the Court of Appeal of Fiji
- Achala Wengappuli – current Judge of the Court of Appeal of Sri Lanka
- Sumudu Premachandra – current Judge of the Court of Appeal of Sri Lanka
- Annalingam Premashankar – current Judge of the Court of Appeal of Sri Lanka
- Nalin Abeysooriya – current Judge and president of the Court of Appeal of Sri Lanka.

Other judges

- Sarath Ambepitiya – former Judge of the High Court of Colombo
- J. R. Weinman – former District Judge of Colombo (note: also listed in Legislators)
- Charles Ambrose Lorensz – former District Judge, Acting Queen's Advocate (note: also listed in Legislators and journalists)
- Dhammika Kitulgoda – District Judge (note: also listed in Civil servants)

== Provincial and local government ==
=== Governors ===
Name	Notability	Reference(s)
Nalin Seneviratne	Lieutenant General Commander of the Army (1985–1988), Governor of North East Province (1988–1993)	
Tyronne Fernando	Member of Parliament for Moratuwa (1977–1989), Governor of North East Province (1993–1994)	
Neville Kanakeratne	Governor of Southern Province (1995–1999)	
D. M. Swaminathan	Member of Parliament – National List (2010–present), Governor of Western Province (1994)	
Hanif Yusuf	Governor of Western Province (2024)	

=== Chief Ministers and Provincial Councilors ===
Name	Notability	Reference(s)
C. V. Vigneswaran	Chief Minister – Northern Province (2013–present), Supreme Court Judge (2001–2004)	
Susil Moonesinghe	Chief Minister – Western Province (1988–1993), member parliament - Colombo (1994–2000)	
Senarath Attanayake	Acting Chief Minister – Uva Province, Uva Provincial Councilor (2016–2017)	
Anuradha Dullewe Wijeyeratne	Sabaragamuwa Provincial Councilor (1988–1993), acting Diyawadana Nilame – Temple of the Tooth (1975–2005)	
Harshana Rajakaruna	Member of Parliament for Gampha (2015–present), Western Provincial Councilor (2014–2015)	

=== Mayors ===
Name	Notability	Reference(s)
V. R. Schockman	Mayor of Colombo (1938–1939)	
S. Sellamuttu	Mayor of Colombo (1951)	
H. Lalith R. J. Nonis	Mayor of Moratuwa (1991–1995)	
Omer Kamil	Mayor of Colombo (1999–2002)	
Prasanna Gunawardena	Mayor of Colombo (2002–2006)	
Cathiravelu Ponnambalam	Mayor of Jaffna (1950–1951)	
Dayantha Liyanage	Mayor of Medway	
L. V. Gooneratne	Inaugural Mayor of Dehiwala-Mount Lavinia (1961–1971)	

=== Municipal Councilors ===
- F. R. Senanayake – former Member of the Colombo Municipal Council (note: also listed in Prominent figures in the Independence Movement)

== Diplomats ==
- Hamilton Shirley Amerasinghe CCS – former President of the United Nations General Assembly, Ceylon's Permanent Representative to the UN, New York and High Commissioner to India (note: also listed in Civil servants)
- Deshamanya Gamani Corea – Under-Secretary-General of the United Nations and Sri Lankan Ambassador to the EEC, Belgium, Luxembourg and the Netherlands (note: also listed in Civil servants)
- Deshamanya Vernon L. B. Mendis SLOS – former United Nations' Special Envoy to the Middle East, Sri Lankan High Commissioner to the United Kingdom, Canada; Ambassador to USSR, Cuba and Secretary General of the Non Aligned Movement
- Rodney Vandergert SLOS – former Permanent Secretary of the Ministry of Foreign Affairs, Sri Lankan Ambassador to China and USSR, Sri Lankan High Commissioner to Canada (note: also listed in Public commissions and Corporations)
- Wilhelm Woutersz SLOS – former Permanent Secretary of the Ministry of Foreign Affairs, Sri Lankan Ambassador to China, Italy and Yugoslavia
- Esala Weerakoon SLOS – former Permanent Secretary of the Ministry of Foreign Affairs, Sri Lankan High Commissioner to India and Ambassador to Norway
- Lal Jayawardena – Second Vice-Chairman of the Group of 24, former Sri Lankan High Commissioner to the United Kingdom and Ambassador to the EEC, Belgium, Luxembourg and the Netherlands (note: also listed in Civil servants)
- John De Saram – former Director of the Office of the Legal Counsel, United Nations Office of Legal Affairs, Member of the International Law Commission and Permanent Representative of Sri Lanka to the UN, New York (note: also listed in Lawyers)
- Susantha De Alwis SLOS – former Sri Lankan Ambassador to the United States, Japan, South Korea and Ambassador/Permanent Representative of Ceylon to the UN, Geneva.
- Yogendra Duraiswamy SLOS – former Sri Lankan Ambassador to United States, China, Italy
- Neville Jansz CCS – former Ceylon's Ambassador to Australia (note: also listed in Civil servants)
- C. Coomaraswamy CCS – former Ceylon's High Commissioner to India (note: also listed in Legislators and Civil Servants)
- Sir Susantha de Fonseka KBE – former Ambassador to Japan and Burma (note: also listed in Legislators)
- Sir Razik Fareed OBE JP – High Commissioner to Pakistan (note: also listed in Legislators)
- Sir Arunachalam Mahadeva – former High Commissioner to India (note: also listed in Legislators)
- Sir Bandara Panabokke Adigar – former Representative of the Government of Ceylon in India (note: also listed in Legislators)
- General Deshamanya D. S. Attygalle MVO CLI – High Commissioner to the United Kingdom (note: also listed in Military)
- General T. I. Weerathunga VSV ndc SLLI – Sri Lankan High Commissioner to Canada (note: also listed in Military)
- General Jagath Jayasuriya VSV USP ndc psc SLAC – current Sri Lankan Ambassador to Brazil (note: also listed in Military)
- Admiral Thisara S.G. Samarasinghe RSP VSV USP ndc psc DISS MNI SLN – Sri Lankan High Commissioner designate to Australia (note: also listed in Military)
- Vice Admiral Asoka de Silva VSV ndc psc SLN – Sri Lankan Ambassador to Cuba (note: also listed in Military)
- Ana Seneviratne (IGP) – Sri Lankan High Commissioner to Malaysia (note: also listed in Police)
- T. B. Panabokke – former High Commissioner to India (note: also listed in Legislators)
- Tyronne Fernando PC – former Sri Lankan Ambassador to France (note: also listed in Legislators)
- Wilmot A. Perera – first Ceylonese Ambassador to China
- Anil Moonesinghe – Sri Lankan Ambassador to Austria and Ambassador/Permanent Representative the UN, Geneva (note: also listed in Legislators)
- Mangala Moonesinghe – former High Commissioner to the United Kingdom (note: also listed in Legislators)
- Susil Moonesinghe – former Ambassador to Iran (note: also listed in Legislators)
- Wickrema Weerasooria – former High Commissioner to Australia and New Zealand (note: also listed in Civil servants)
- Ernest Corea – Sri Lanka's former Ambassador to the United States, High Commissioner to Canada (note: also listed in Media personalities and Journalists)
- Daya Perera PC – Sri Lankan High Commissioner to Canada and former Ambassador to the United Nations
- Deshamanya Neville Kanakeratne – Sri Lankan Ambassador to the United States and High Commissioner to India (note: also listed in Viceregal)
- Oliver Weerasinghe – Sri Lanka's former Ambassador to the United States (note: also listed in Architects)
- Tissa Wijeyeratne – Sri Lankan Ambassador to France, Switzerland and UNESCO, Senior Advisor (Foreign Affairs) to the Prime Minister, Additional Secretary to Ministry of External Affairs and Defence
- Omer Kamil – former Sri Lankan Ambassador to Iran (note: also listed in Mayors)
- T. D. S. A. Dissanayake – former Sri Lankan Ambassador to Indonesia and Egypt; prominent Sri Lankan diplomat in the UN
- S. J. Walpita CCS – former Ceylon's Ambassador to the Federal Republic of Germany, the Netherlands and Belgium (note: also listed in Civil servants)
- Vipula Wanigasekera – former Sri Lanka's first Consul General to Norway, Director General, Sri Lanka Tourism Authority, Ministry of Tourism (note: also listed in Civil servants)

== Civil servants ==
- Hamilton Shirley Amerasinghe CCS – former Permanent Secretary of the Ministry of Finance & Treasury, Ministry of Health (note: also listed in Diplomats)
- Deshamanya C.A. Coorey SLAS – former Permanent Secretary of the Ministry of Finance & Treasury
- Deshamanya Baku Mahadeva CCS – former Permanent Secretary of the Treasury, the Ministry of Agriculture and Food and the Ministry of Public Administration and Home Affairs
- Lal Jayawardena – former Permanent Secretary of the Ministry of Finance & Treasury; founding Director of the World Institute for Development Economics Research (note: also listed in Diplomats)
- Lalith Weeratunga SLAS – current Permanent Secretary to the President
- Deshamanya Gamani Corea – former Secretary-General of the UNCTD (1974–1984), Permanent Secretary of the Ministry of Planning and Economic Affairs, Senior Deputy Governor of the Central Bank of Ceylon (note: also listed in Diplomats)
- Nissanka Wijeyeratne CCS – former Permanent Secretary of the Ministries of Information & Broadcasting, Transport and Cultural Affairs (note: also listed in Legislators)
- A. S. Jayawardene – former Permanent Secretary of the Ministry of Finance & Treasury, Governor of the Central Bank of Sri Lanka and former Alternate Executive Director of the International Monetary Fund (IMF), Washington D.C
- Bernard Peiris OBE JP – former Cabinet Secretary
- H. C. Goonewardene CCS – former Permanent Secretary to the Ministry of Home Affairs
- S. J. Walpita CCS – former Permanent Secretary to the Ministry of Industries & Fisheries and Vice-Chancellor of University of Ceylon, Peradeniya (note: also listed in Diplomats)
- Walwin de Silva CCS – former Vice Chancellor of University of Ceylon, Colombo and Director of Education (note: also listed in Legislators)
- Charitha Ratwatte – former Permanent Secretary of the Ministry of Finance & Treasury, Ministry of Youth Affairs
- Wickrema Weerasooria – former Permanent Secretary to the Ministry of Plan Implementation and current Insurance Ombudsman (note: also listed in Diplomats)
- Sunil Mendis – former Governor of the Central Bank of Sri Lanka
- Arjuna Mahendran – former Governor of the Central Bank of Sri Lanka and former Chairman of Board of Investment of Sri Lanka (note: also listed in Corporate Executives)
- Indrajit Coomaraswamy – former Governor of the Central Bank of Sri Lanka and former Director Economic Affairs, Commonwealth Secretariat
- Nihal Seneviratne – former Secretary General of Parliament (1981–1994) and parliamentary affairs adviser to the Prime Minister
- Dhammika Kitulgoda – Secretary General of Parliament (1999–2002, 2008–2012), Secretary to the Parliamentary Council and former District Judge (note: also listed in Judges)
- Dhammika Dasanayake – current Secretary General of Parliament
- Vernon Abeysekera CCS – former Postmaster General and Director of Radio Ceylon.
- Neville Jansz CCS – Director General of the Department of Foreign Affairs, Ministry of External Affairs and Defence (note: also listed in Diplomats)
- C. Coomaraswamy CCS – former Registrar General and Government Agent (note: also listed in Legislators, Diplomats)
- Chandranath Amarasekara, Deputy Governor of the Central Bank of Sri Lanka and former Alternate Executive Director for Sri Lanka, India, Bangladesh and Bhutan of the International Monetary Fund
- Victor Gunasekara CCS – former Controller of Imports Exports and Government Agent of Kegalle
- Aubrey Neil Weinman OBE – First Superintendent (Director) of the Colombo Zoological Gardens
- Captain Cyril Nicholas MC KRR – first Warden of the Wild Life Department (note: also listed in Military)
- R.G. Anthonisz ISO JP – first Government Archivist
- Gamini Iriyagolla SLAS – former Presidential adviser
- Donald Rutnam – Deputy Commissioner of the Central Provinces and Berar and member of the Indian Civil Service (note: also listed in Sportsmen)

== Military ==
=== Army ===
Name	Notability	Reference(s)
Bertram Heyn	Major General, Commander of the Sri Lankan Army (1966–1967)	
Sepala Attygalle	General, Commander of the Sri Lankan Army (1967–1977), Permanent Secretary Ministry of Defence, Equerry The Queen (1953)	
Tissa Weerathunga	General, Commander of the Sri Lankan Army (1981–1985), GOC Joint Operations Command	
Jagath Jayasuriya	General, Commander of the Sri Lankan Army (2007–2013), Chief of Defence Staff	
Nalin Seneviratne	General, Commander of the Sri Lankan Army (1985–1988)	
Crishantha de Silva	General, Commander of the Sri Lankan Army (2015–2017), Chief of Defence Staff	
Vijaya Wimalaratne †	Major General, Jaffna Brigade Commander	
Channa Gunathilaka	Major General, Deputy Chief of Staff of the Sri Lanka Army	
Gemunu Kulatunge	Major General, Deputy Chief of Staff of the Sri Lanka Army (1995–1997)	
Sumith Balasuriya	Major General, Commandant, Sri Lanka Army Volunteer Force (2007–2010), Vice Chancellor/Commandant General Sir John Kotelawala Defence University	
T. N. De Silva	Major General, Commandant Sri Lanka Army Volunteer Force, Director National Cadet Corps (1994–1999)	
Jayantha de S. Jayaratne	Major General, Commander Security Forces Headquarters – Jaffna	
Nandana Udawatta	Major General, Commander Security Forces Headquarters – Jaffna (2009–present)	
Parakrama Pannipitiya	Major General Commander Security Forces Headquarters – East (2007–2008)	
Athula Jayawardane	Major General, Commander Security Forces Headquarters – Mullaitivu, Master-General of the Ordnance, Director Operations, General Staff	
Devinda Kalupahana	Major General, Director Operations General Staff, Commandant Sri Lanka Military Academy	
C. H. Fernando	Major General, Director Operations General Staff, Commandant Army Training Centre, Commander Northern Command	
Percy Fernando †	Major General, Deputy GOC 54 Division	
Chelliah Thurairaja	Major General, Director Army Medical Services and Colonel Commandant of the Sri Lanka Army Medical Corps	
Udaya Nanayakkara	Major General, Chief Field Engineer Sri Lanka Army (2010–present)	
G. L. Sigera	Major General, Master-General of the Ordnance	
Bhathiya Jayatilleka †	Brigadier, Brigade commander 54-1 brigade – 54 Division	
Dennis Hapugalle	Brigadier, Chief of Civil Defence, Permanent Secretary Ministry of Internal Security	
M. H. Gunaratne	Brigadier, Commander Security Forces Headquarters - East, Commandant Army Training Centre	
Rohan Jayasinghe	Brigadier, Deputy Commandant Army Command and Staff College	
Nihal Hapuarachchi	Brigadier, Commandant School of Military Engineering, Director Recruitment	
G. R. Jayasinghe	Brigadier, Sri Lanka Army Ordnance Corps, founder Sri Lanka Rifle Corps	
Parry Liyanage	Brigadier, Quartermaster-General, Adjutant General	
Fredrick de Saram	Colonel, first commanding officer Ceylon Artillery, leader of the attempted military coup (1962)	
Rex De Costa	Lieutenant Colonel, Commanding officer, Ruhunu Regiment, Vice President, World Veterans Federation (1961–1963)	

=== Navy ===
Name	Notability	Reference(s)
Ravindra Wijegunaratne	Admiral, Chief of the Defence Staff (2017–2019), Commander of Navy (2015–2017), Director General of the Sri Lanka Coast Guard	
Basil Gunasekara	Admiral, Commander of Navy (1973–1979)	
Thisara Samarasinghe	Admiral, Commander of Navy (2009–2011)	
Nishantha Ulugetenne	Vice Admiral, Current Commander of Navy	
Asoka de Silva (admiral)	Vice Admiral, Commander of Navy (1983–1986)	
Rajan Kadiragamar	Rear Admiral, Commander of Royal Ceylon Navy (1960–1970)	
Priyantha Perera (naval officer)	Rear Admiral, Current Chief of Staff (2022–Present)	
Y. N. Jayarathna	Rear Admiral, Deputy Chief of Staff (2021–2022), Director General Operations Sri Lanka Navy (2020–2021)	
Manil Mendis	Rear Admiral, Director Naval Training, Commander Southern Naval Area	
Palitha Fernando	Rear Admiral Judge Advocate of the Sri Lanka Navy, Attornery General (2012–2014), Solicitor General (2011–2012)	
Prasanna Alahakoon	Commodore, Deputy Superintendent SLN Dockyard, Deputy Director Naval Projects and Plans	
Kalana Jinadasa	Commodore, Director Naval Inspectorate, Deputy Director Naval Operations	

=== Air Force ===
Name	Notability	Reference(s)
Harry Goonatilake	Air Chief Marshall, Commander of the Air Force (1976–1981)	
Harsha Abeywickrama	Air Chief Marshall, Commander of the Air Force (2011–2014)	
Kolitha Gunathilake	Air Chief Marshall, Commander of the Air Force (2014–2015), Chief of the Defence Staff (2015–present)	
Nimal Gunaratne	Air Vice Marshall, Director Health Services – Sri Lanka Air Force (1992–2011)	
A. Kumaresan	Air Vice Marshall, Director Planning – Sri Lanka Air Force	
Shirantha Goonatilake †	Air Commodore, Commanding Officer – No. 1 Flying Training Wing	
Rohan Pathirage	Air Vice Marshall, Director Electronics and Telecommunications Engineering – Sri Lanka Air Force	

=== Ceylon Defence Force ===
Name	Notability	Reference(s)
John Lionel Kotalawela	Prime Minister of Ceylon (1953–1956), Member of Parliament - Dodangaslanda (1947–1959), Commanding Officer of the Ceylon Light Infantry	
T. G. Jayewardene	Member of the State Council of Ceylon (1933–1936), Commanding Officer of the Ceylon Light Infantry	

=== British Army ===
Name	Notability	Reference(s)
Cyril Nicholas	Military Cross recipient – King's Royal Rifles World War I	
Henry Speldewinde de Boer	Military Cross recipient – Royal Army Medical Corps World War I	

== Police ==
Name	Notability	Reference(s)
Cyril Herath	Inspector General of Police (1985–1988), Chairman National Savings Bank (1994–2002)	
S. A. Dissanayake	Inspector General of Police (1963–1966)	
Ana Seneviratne	Inspector General of Police (1978–1982), Sri Lankan High Commissioner to Malaysia (1982–1985)	
Cyril Dissanayake	Deputy Inspector General of Police, leader of Attempted military coup in 1962	
Sydney de Zoysa	Deputy Inspector General of Police, leader of Attempted military coup in 1962	
Eddie Gray	First Ceylonese head of the Police Mounted Section, Olympic Lightweight Boxer (1948)	

== Academics ==
Name	Notability	Reference(s)
Nicholas Attygalle	Vice-Chancellor University of Ceylon (1954–1967)	
E. O. E. Pereira	Vice-Chancellor University of Ceylon (1969–1971)	
C. L. V. Jayathilake	Chancellor Wayamba University (2008–2013), Vice Chancellor University of Peradeniya (1989–1991)	
Hema Ellawala	Vice Chancellor of the University of Sri Jayewardenepura	
Monte Cassim	Vice Chancellor Ritsumeikan Asia Pacific University (2004–2010)	
M. J. S. Wijeyaratne	Vice Chancellor University of Kelaniya (2005–2008)	
Susirith Mendis	Vice Chancellor of the University of Ruhuna (2007 - 2013)	
R. K. W. Goonesekera	Chancellor University of Peradeniya (2002–2005), Principal Sri Lanka Law College (1966–1974)	
T. Nadaraja	Chancellor University of Jaffna (1984–2004)	
T. Varagunam	Chancellor Eastern University, Sri Lanka	

- Vidya Jyothi V. K. Samaranayake – former Dean of the Faculty of Science, University of Colombo, Professor of Computer Science and Founder of University of Colombo School of Computing
- Vidya Jyothi Osmund Jayaratne – former President of the Colombo Campus, University of Sri Lanka (now University of Colombo), Emeritus Professor of Physics and left wing politician
- Chandre Dharma-wardana – former President of the Vidyodaya Campus, University of Ceylon, (now University of Sri Jayewardenepura) currently Professor of Theoretical Physics at the Université de Montréal
- K. Kailasapathy – first president of the Jaffna Campus, University of Sri Lanka
- V. Sivalingam – Founder of Faculty of Medicine, University of Peradeniya and first Professor of Parasitology in the University of Ceylon
- S.R. Kottegoda – former Dean and Professor of the Medical Faculty, University of Colombo, and National Coordinator, Health Systems Research, Ministry of Health
- Sanath Lamabathusooriya MBE – former Dean of the Medical Faculty, University of Colombo and Emeritus Professor of Paediatrics (note: also listed in Medicine)
- Vidya Jyothi Janaka de Silva – Professor Emeritus of Medicine and former Dean, Faculty of Medicine, University of Kelaniya, and former director, Postgraduate Institute of Medicine, University of Colombo (note: also listed in Medicine)
- Vidya Jyothi A. W. Mailvaganam – former Dean of Faculty of Science, University of Ceylon
- S. Mahalingam – former Dean of the Faculty of Veterinary Sciences, University of Peradeniya and Professor of Veterinary Clinical Sciences
- Ajith P. Madurapperuma – Former Dean and Senior Lecturer, Faculty of Information Technology, University of Moratuwa
- Sunitha Wickramasinghe FRCP – Deputy Dean of the Imperial College School of Medicine and Professor of Haematology
- David de Kretser – former Associate Dean of the Faculty of Medicine, Nursing and Health Sciences, Monash University (note: also listed in Viceregal)
- Michael Dias Bandaranaike QC – Professor of Jurisprudence, University of Cambridge; Director of Studies and Fellow of Magdalene College, Cambridge
- Vidya Jyothi Chandra Wickramasinghe FIMA FRAS FRSA – Professor of Applied Mathematics and Astronomy at Cardiff University and Director of the Cardiff Centre for Astrobiology
- K. N. Seneviratne – Professor of Medicine and founder director of Sri Lanka's Postgraduate Institute of Medicine
- Muhammad Ajward Macan Markar FRCP – first Professor of Medicine, University of Ceylon, Peradeniya
- Saman Kelegama – Executive Director, Institute of Policy Studies of Sri Lanka and former President of the Sri Lanka Economic Association
- K. N. Jayatilleke – Head of the Department of Philosophy at the University of Ceylon and Professor of Philosophy
- Kollupitiye Mahinda Sangharakkhitha Thera – Professor and Head of the Buddhist and Pail Faculty of the University of Kelaniya (note: also listed in Prelates)
- Rohan Abeyaratne – Quentin Berg Professor of Mechanics and CEO/Director of the SMART Centre, Massachusetts Institute of Technology
- Nalin Kulatilaka – Wing Tat Lee Family Professor of Management and Research Director of Institute for Leading in a Dynamic Economy, Boston University
- Gihan Wikramanayake – Professor of Computer Science and Director, University of Colombo School of Computing
- Janek Ratnatunga – former Head of the School of Commerce, University of South Australia and Professor of Accounting
- Vidya Jyothi Rezvi Sheriff – Senior Professor of Medicine, Director of the Post Graduate Institute of Medicine, University of Colombo
- Kumaraswamy "Vela" Velupillai – Professor of Economics, Department of Economics, University of Trento
- Milroy Paul MRCP FRCS – first Professor of Surgery, Ceylon Medical College and co-founder International College of Surgeons
- Lakshman Marasinghe – Emeritus Professor of Law, University of Windsor (note: also listed in Public commissions and corporations)
- Saman Gunatilake FRCP FCCP – Professor of Medicine, University of Sri Jayewardenepura (note: also listed in Medicine)
- Nalin de Silva – Professor of Mathematics, Department of Mathematics, University of Kelaniya
- A. Suri Ratnapala – Professor of Law, T.C. Beirne School of Law, University of Queensland
- Nihal Jayawickrama – former Professor of Law at University of Hong Kong and Ariel F Sallows Professor of Human Rights at University of Saskatchewan (note: also listed in lawyers)
- Chandima Gomes – Professor of Electrical Engineering, Universiti Putra Malaysia and Head of the Centre for Electromagnetic and Lightning Protection Malaysia
- R. K. W. Goonesekera – Professor of Law, Ahmadu Bello University
- Asantha Cooray – Associate Professor, Department of Physics and Astronomy, University of California, Irvine and a leading researcher in the field of Cosmology and theoretical astrophysics
- Brendon Gooneratne – Head and Senior Lecturer, Department of Parasitology, University of Ceylon, Peradeniya (note: also listed in Authors)
- Murugesapillai Maheswaran – Professor Emeritus of Mathematics, University of Wisconsin Stevens Point at Wausau, formerly Professor and Head, Department of Mathematics, University of Peradeniya.

== Scientists ==
Name	Notability	Reference(s)
Mohan Munasinghe	Physicist, academic, economist	
Ranjan Ramasamy	Immunologist, biochemist, Chairman National Science Foundation	
A. M. Mubarak	Director Industrial Technology Institute, former director, National Science Foundation	
Ray Jayawardhana	Astronomer, author, professor University of Toronto, Canada Research Chair in Observational Astrophysics	
Suran Goonatilake	Chairman/co-founder of Bodymetrics and Searchspace, Professor University of the Arts London	

== Educationalists ==
Name	Notability	Reference(s)
J. C. A. Corea	First Ceylonese Principal of Royal College, Colombo (1946–1953)	
Dudley de Silva	Principal of Royal College, Colombo (1954–1966)	
H. J. Wijesinghe	Acting Principal of Royal College, Colombo (1938–1939)	
Peter De Abrew	Industrialist, philanthropist, co-founder Musaeus College, Colombo	
Mohan Lal Grero	Member of Parliament for Colombo (2010–present), founder Lyceum International School	

== Public commissions and corporations ==
Name	Notability	Reference(s)
C. L. V. Jayathilake	Chancellor – Wayamba University, Vice Chancellor – University of Peradeniya (1989–1991)	
Rodney Vandergert	Permanent Secretary Ministry of Foreign Affairs, Chairman Public Service Commission, Ambassador – People's Republic of China, Soviet Union	
Lakshman Marasinghe	Chairman Law Commission of Sri Lanka	
Ranjit Abeysuriya	Chairman National Police Commission, Director Public Prosecutions Attorney General's Department	
N. E. Weerasooriya	Chairman Commission of Broadcasting (1953–?), Chairman Ceylon Petroleum Corporation (1962–?)	
Asantha De Mel	International test cricketer (1982–1986)	

== Industrialists and corporate executives ==
Name	Notability	Reference(s)
Sir Charles Henry de Soysa	Tea planter, banker, 19th-century entrepreneur, philanthropist	
Sir Wilfred de Soysa	Tea planter, entrepreneur, philanthropist	
Sir Ernest de Silva	Business magnate, banker, barrister, philanthropist	
Sir Henry de Mel	19th-century industrialist, lawyer, philanthropist, member Legislative Council (1921–1931)	
Upali Wijewardene	Founder/chairman Upali Group	
Mallory Evan Wijesinghe	Chairman Ceylon Chamber of Commerce, founding chairman Ceylon Hotels Corporation (1967–1970)	
Mahesh Amalean	Chairman of MAS Holdings	
J. A. Martenze	Founding chairman DFCC Bank, appointed member of Parliament (1947–?)	
Ken Balendra	Chairman John Keells Holdings (1990–2000), Bank of Ceylon (2000–2002), Ceylon Tobacco Company (2003–2008)	
Hemaka Amarasuriya	Chairman Singer Sri Lanka, Sri Lanka Insurance, Nations Trust Bank, NDB Group	
M. J. C. Amarasuriya	Banker, philanthropist, chairman Commercial Bank, chairman United Motors Ltd, chairman International Chamber of Commerce	
Sunil Mendis	Governor of the Central Bank of Sri Lanka (2004–2006), chairman Hayleys	
Lalith Kotelawala	Chairman Ceylinco Consolidated	
A. S. Jayawardene	Governor of the Central Bank of Sri Lanka (1995–2004), Secretary of the Treasury (1994–1995), Chairman Bank of Ceylon	
Eran Wickramaratne	National List (2010–2015), Colombo (2015–present), Chairman ICTA, CEO National Development Bank	
Arjuna Mahendran	Governor of the Central Bank of Sri Lanka (2015–2016), Managing Director HSBC Private Bank	
Sanjiva Weerawarana	Founder/chairman/CEO WSO2 Inc., founding member Lanka Software Foundation	
Arjuna Sittampalam	Author, Investment Banker	
Ranji Salgado	Economist, senior International Monetary Fund official	
Dulith Herath	Entrepreneur, founder and chairman of e-commerce organization, kapruka.com	
Ashan Perera	Entrepreneur, Founder of the "Road to Rights" youth-led organization and UN SDG action award winner.	

== Sports ==
=== Sports administrators ===
Name	Notability	Reference(s)
V. R. Schockman	First President of the Ceylon Olympic and Empire Games Association (current National Olympic Committee of Sri Lanka) (note: also listed in Legislators)	
Donald Obeyesekere	Former President of the National Olympic Committee of Ceylon (note: also listed in Legislators)	
Edward Gray (policemen)	Former Secretary of the National Olympic Committee of Ceylon (note: also listed in Police)	
A. E. Christoffelsz	Former President of the Board of Control for Cricket (1950–1952)	
B. R. Heyn	Former President of the Board of Control for Cricket (1976–1978), Ceylon cricketer (note: also listed in Military)	
Tambyah Murugaser	Former Vice President of the Board of Control for Cricket, Sri Lanka team manager	
Ranjan Madugalle	Current Chief Match Referee of the International Cricket Council	
Ajith C. S. Perera	Former Sri Lankan cricket umpire and qualified Scorer (note: also listed in Activists)	
Maiya Gunasekara	Former Sri Lankan Rugby Captain, former President of the Sri Lankan Rugby Football Union (SLRFU) (note: also listed in Medicine)	

=== Sports ===
Name	Notability	Reference(s)
Ranjan Madugalle	International cricket player (1982–1988)	
Gamini Goonesena	First-class cricket player (1950–1964)	
Churchill Gunasekara	First-class cricket player (1919–1935)	
Fredrick de Saram	First-class cricket player (1933–1936)	
C. I. Gunesekera	First-class cricket player	
Satyendra Coomaraswamy	First-class cricket player	
Fitzroy Crozier	First-class cricket player (1957–1967)	
Dav Whatmore	International cricket player (Australia) (1979)	
Asantha De Mel	International cricket player (1982–1986)	
N. S. Joseph	First-class cricket player	
Jayantha Amerasinghe	International cricket player (1984)	
Sudath Pasqual	One Day International cricket player (1979)	
Rohan Jayasekera (cricketer)	International cricket player (1982)	
Roshan Jurangpathy	International cricket player (1985–1986)	
Jehan Mubarak	International cricket player (2002–2015)	
Gajan Pathmanathan	First-class cricket player (1966–1974)	
Kushal Janith Perera	International cricket player (2015–2016)	
Mahesh Rodrigo	First-class cricket player (1949–1952); international rugby player	
Barney Henricus	British Empire Games athlete – 1938 (boxing – featherweight class) gold medal	
Alex Obeysekere	British Empire Games athlete – 1950 (boxing – welterweight class) bronze medal	
Niluka Karunaratne	Olympic athlete – 2012 (badminton), Commonwealth Games athlete – 2014 (badminton)	
Ravi Jayewardene	Olympic athlete – 1964 (50 metre rifle, prone), Commonwealth Games athlete	
Basil Henricus	Olympic athlete – 1952 (boxing, lightweight)	
Donald Rutnam	Olympic athlete – 1924 Summer Olympics (tennis), Wimbledon Championships (1928–1938)	
Mahendra Kasippillai	First-class cricketer for All-Ceylon and Cambridge University	

== Engineers ==
Name	Notability	Reference(s)
E. O. E. Pereira	Vice Chancellor University of Ceylon (1969–1971)	
Kanagaratnam Sriskandan	Chief Highway Engineer Department for Transport (UK)	
U. N. Gunasekera	Civil engineer	
Chandima Gomes	Engineer, physicist, author	

== Legal ==
Name	Notability	Reference(s)
Suhada Gamalath	Permanent Secretary Ministry of Justice and Law Reforms	
Nihal Jayawickrama	Permanent Secretary Ministry of Justice, Executive Director Transparency International	
Parinda Ranasinghe Jr.	Attorney General (2024–present)	
Sanjay Rajaratnam	Attorney General (2021–2024)	
Mohan Peiris	Attorney General (2008–2011)	
C. R. De Silva	Attorney General (2000–2008), Chairman Lessons Learnt and Reconciliation Commission	
Shibly Aziz	Attorney General (1995–1996), Chairman Civil Aviation Authority (2003–2005, 2015–present)	
Sir Ponnambalam Ramanathan	Solicitor General (1892–1902), member of Legislative Council (1911–1921, 1924–1930), unofficial member of Legislative Council (1879–1892, 1922–1924)	
Sir Thomas Garvin	Solicitor General (1915–1917), Puisne Justice (1924–1935)	
Maas Thajoon Akbar	Solicitor General (1925–1928), Puisne Justice	
T. S. Fernando	Solicitor General (1952–1954), Puisne Justice (1956–?)	
Mervyn Fonseka	Solicitor General (1943–1945)	
Sinha Basnayake	Director General Legal Division, United Nations Office of Legal Affairs	
John De Saram	Director Office of the Legal Counsel, United Nations Office of Legal Affairs, member of United Nations International Law Commission	
Ranjit Abeysuriya	Chairman National Police Commission (2002–?), Director Public Prosecutions Attorney General's Department, President of Sri Lankan Bar Association (1991–?)	
Harry Wilfred Jayewardene	Chairman Sri Lanka Foundation Institute, member of United Nations Commission on Human Rights, President of Sri Lankan Bar Association	
Somasundaram Nadesan	Member of Senate of Ceylon (1947–1971), President Bar Council	
Herbert Sri Nissanka	Member of Parliament for Kurunegala (1947–1954?)	
Frederick Dornhorst	First King's Counsel of Ceylon	
Sam Kadirgamar	Queen's Counsel	
George Edmund Chitty	Queen's Counsel	
Chula De Silva	President's Counsel and Rhodes Scholar	
A. C. de Zoysa	President's Counsel and President of the Bar Association of Sri Lanka	
Gritakumar E. Chitty	Registrar International Tribunal for the Law of the Sea	
Charles Matthew Fernando	First Ceylonese Crown Counsel	

== Architects ==
Name	Notability	Reference(s)
Geoffrey Bawa	Architect	
Bevis Bawa	Landscape architect	
Oliver Weerasinghe	Architect, town planner	
Valentine Gunasekara	Architect	
Raj Barr-Kumar	National President of the American Institute of Architects (1997)	

== Medicine ==
Name	Notability	Reference(s)
Sir Marcus Fernando	Member of Legislative Council of Ceylon (1921–1931), first Consultant Physician Colombo General Hospital, Registrar Ceylon Medical College	
Sir Arthur Marcelles de Silva	Member of the Public Service Commission, first Ceylonese to gain Fellowship (FRCS) of the Royal College of Surgeons of England	
E. M. Wijerama	First President Ceylon College of Physicians, President Ceylon Medical Association	
Richard Lionel Spittel	Surgeon, author, president of the Ceylon Branch British Medical Association	
Gerald Henry Cooray	Pathologists, President of the Ceylon Medical Association	
J. B. Peiris	President of Sri Lanka College of Physicians, founder of the Institute of Neurology	
Saman Gunatilake	Neurologist, Head of Department of Medicine, University of Kelaniya, Professor of Medicine University of Sri Jayawardanapura, President Ceylon College of Physicians	
Sanath Lamabathusooriya	Paediatrician, Dean Faculty of Medicine, University of Colombo (2002–2005)	
Janaka de Silva	Physician, President of Ceylon College of Physicians (2004), Chairman National Research Council of Sri Lanka (2013–2019)	
Susirith Mendis	Physician, Vice-Chancellor University of Ruhuna (2007 - 2013) Dean, Faculty of Medicine, University of Ruhuna (1996 - 2005), Chairman, Board of Management, PGIM (2003 - 2007)	
Nalin Rodrigo	Obstetrician, gynaecologist, surgeon, Medical Director Asha Central Hospital, Chairman Sri Jayawardanapura General Hospital	
U. S. Jayawickrama	Endocrinologist, founder Diabetes Association of Sri Lanka	
Surendra Ramachandran	Nephrologist, founder of Sri Lanka's first Dialysis Unit, President of Ceylon College of Physicians	
H. H. R. Samarasinghe	Physician, medical administrator, president of Sri Lanka Medical Council	
Charles Alwis Hewavitharana	Physician, member University College Ceylon Council	
Maiya Gunasekera	Surgeon, President Sri Lankan Rugby Football Union (1998–1999)	
Rezvi Sheriff	Emeritus Professor of Medicine, University of Colombo, Physician first trained Nephrologist, President Sri Lanka Medical Council, Ceylon College of Physician, Founder National Institute Nephrology and Transplant Institute, Member Sri Lanka Medical Council	

== Media ==
Name	Notability	Reference(s)
Charles Ambrose Lorensz	Non-official member Legislative Council of Ceylon (1856–1864), founder/managing editor Ceylon Examiner	
Vernon Corea	Pioneer radio broadcaster/news director Radio Ceylon, Sri Lanka Broadcasting Corporation, Ethnic Minorities Adviser to the BBC	
Livy Wijemanne	Pioneer radio broadcaster Radio Ceylon, Chairman Sri Lanka Broadcasting Corporation (1984–?)	
Ernest Corea	Editor Ceylon Daily News/The Ceylon Observer, High Commissioner - Canada, Ambassador - United States, Cuba, Mexico	
Mervyn de Silva	Editor in Chief of Lake House/The Times of Ceylon, editor Ceylon Daily News	
Malinda Seneviratne	Writer, poet, journalist	
Edmund de Livera	Editor of The Times of Ceylon	
Dushy Ranetunge	International journalist	
Dinesh Weerawansa	Editor in Chief of the Sunday Observer (2006–2014)	

== Aviation ==
Name	Notability	Reference(s)
James Peter Obeyesekere III	Member of Parliament for Attanagalla (1960–1965), first Ceylonese to fly solo from England to Ceylon (1946)	

== Arts ==
Name	Notability	Reference(s)
James De Alwis	19th-century Sinhala poet, writer	
Richard Lionel Spittel	Author	
Richard Leslie Brohier	Author	
Phiroz Mehta	Writer, lecturer	
Carl Muller	Author, poet, journalist	
Carl Muller	Author, poet, journalist	
Laki Senanayake	Artist	
Shyam Selvadurai	Author	
Lucky de Chickera	Author	
Harold Peiris	Artist, author, Sinhalese translator	
Rohan Joseph de Saram	Orchestral conductor	
Lakshman Joseph de Saram	Violinist, composer	
Ranidu Lankage	Musician	
Krishan Maheson	Musician, singer	
Dushyanth Weeraman	Musician, actor	
J. L. K. van Dort	19th-century painter	
Rukshan Perera	Musician	
Winston Ajith Fernando	Composer, Music Director, Conductor	

== Activists ==
Name	Notability	Reference(s)
Ajith C. S. Perera	Disability rights activist, Chief Executive / Secretary-General– Idiriya (2016–present)	
Bala Tampoe	General Secretary of the Ceylon Mercantile, Industrial and General Workers Union	
Percy Wickremasekera	General Secretary of the United Corporations and Mercantile Union	
Kumar Ponnambalam	Leader of All Ceylon Tamil Congress, Presidential candidate (1982)	
Ashan Perera	Founder of the Road to Rights / Recipient of the United Nations SDG Action Award 2018	

== Religion ==
Name	Notability	Reference(s)
Daranagama Kusaladhamma Thero	Buddhist monk, founder of the first Buddhist television network The Buddhist	
Lakdasa De Mel	First Bishop of Kurunegala (1950–1962), last Metropolitan Bishop of India, Pakistan, Burma and Ceylon (1962–1970)	
Harold de Soysa	First Ceylonese Bishop of Colombo (1964–1971)	
Roger Herft	Archbishop of Perth (2005–2016), Bishop of Newcastle (1993–2005), Bishop of Waikato (1986–1992)	
Kollupitiye Mahinda Sangharakkhitha Thera	Chief Incumbent Kelaniya Raja Maha Vihara (1992–?)	
Lakshman Wickremasinghe	Bishop of Kurunegala (1962–1983)	
Cyril Abeynaike	Bishop of Colombo (1971–1977)	
Kenneth Fernando	Bishop of Colombo (1992–2001)	
Duleep De Chickera	Anglican Bishop of Colombo (2001–2010)	
Ivan Corea	Rural Dean of Colombo	
Francis Lorenz Beven	Archdeacon of Jaffna (1925–1935), Archdeacon of Colombo (1935–1947)	
Neranjan Wijeyeratne	Diyawadana Nilame (Chief lay Custodian) Temple of the Tooth, Kandy (1985–2005)	

== Old Royalists in fiction ==
Many fictional characters have been described as Old Royalists. These include:

- Carlaboy von Bloss from the novel Once Upon a Tender Time
- Allan from the novel (later made into a film) Kaliyugaya
- Malin from the novel (later made into a film) Yuganthaya
- Mithra Dias from the novel The Giniralla Conspiracy
- The revolutionary Kumudu Prasanna from the novel The Giniralla Conspiracy
- Janendra "Janu" Samarawickrama from the novel There is Something I Have to Tell You
