= List of Sri Lankan academics =

The following is a list of Sri Lankan academics.

== A ==
- Nicholas Attygalle
- Sarath Amunugama
- Arisen Ahubudu
- Lalith Athulathmudali
- Arthur C. Clarke

== B ==
- Seneka Bibile
- Osmund Bopearachchi

== C ==
- Cyril Ponnamperuma
- Muhammad Monty Cassim
- Asantha Cooray
- Jamsheed K Choksy

== D ==
- William de Alwis
- Malathi de Alwis
- David de Kretser
- Nalin de Silva
- Mahinda Deegalle
- Colvin R. de Silva
- Paules Edward Pieris Deraniyagala
- Chandre Dharma-wardana
- J B Disanayake
- Siran Upendra Deraniyagala

== E ==
- Hema Ellawala

== F ==
- Devaka Fernando
- Jeyaraj Fernandopulle

== G ==
- Lalith Gamage
- Brendon Gooneratne
- Savitri Goonesekere
- Sarath Gunapala
- Ananda W.P. Guruge

== H ==
- George Morrison Reid Henry

== I ==
- Abhaya Induruwa

== J ==
- Osmund Jayaratne
- C. L. V. Jayathilake
- K. N. Jayatilleke
- Kumari Jayawardena
- Amal Jayawardane
- Lal Jayawardane

== K ==
- Kusuma Karunaratne
- Sam Karunaratne
- Karunasena Kodituwakku
- Kollupitiye Mahinda Sangharakkhitha Thera
- Sarath Kotagama
- S.R. Kottegoda
- Edward Frederick Kelaart
- W. S. Karunaratne

== M ==
- Sunanda Mahendra
- Gunapala Piyasena Malalasekera
- Patrick Mendis
- Susirith Mendis
- Mohan Munasinghe

== N ==
- T. Nadaraja

== O ==
- Gananath Obeyesekere

== P ==
- Senarath Paranavithana
- Ajith C. S. Perera
- E.O.E. Pereira
- G. L. Peiris
- Malik Peiris
- N. M. Perera

== R ==
- Walpola Rahula
- Anushka Rajapaksha
- Suri Ratnapala
- Kavan Ratnatunga

== S ==
- V. K. Samaranayake
- Ediriweera Sarachchandra
- Regi Siriwardena
- Visvanatha Sastriyar
- Priyani Soysa

== U ==
- Deepika Udagama
- Jayadeva Uyangoda

== V ==
- T. Varagunam

== W ==
- Frank Wall
- Deepal Warakagoda
- Wickrema Weerasooria
- Tilak Weerasooriya
- Chandra Wickramasinghe
- Maitree Wickramasinghe
- Nira Wickramasinghe
- Anton Wicky
- M.J.S.Wijeratne
- Rajiva Wijesinha

== Z ==
- A. P. de Zoysa
