= Wijethunga =

Wijethunga is a surname. Notable people with the surname include:

- A. A. Wijethunga (born 1957), Sri Lankan politician
- Bandara Wijethunga (1939–1990), Sri Lankan poet

== See also ==
- Wijetunga
