= S. Mahalingam =

S. Mahalingam may refer to:

- S. Mahalingam (engineer) (1926–2015), Sri Lankan mechanical engineer and academic
- S. Mahalingam (veterinarian), Sri Lankan veterinarian and academic
