= Beven =

Beven is a surname. Notable people with the surname include:

- Brad Beven (born 1969), Australian triathlete
- Ian Beven (born 1958), Australian-Scottish cricketer
- Keith Beven (born 1950), British hydrologist
- Lorenz Beven (1872–1947), Sri Lankan Anglican priest
