= Wijetunga =

Wijetunga is a surname. Notable people with the surname include:

- Asoka Wijetunga, Sri Lankan judge
- Dingiri Banda Wijetunga (1916–2008), President of Sri Lanka
- Lahiru Wijetunga (born 1989), Sri Lankan cricketer
- Vernon Wijetunga (1920–2008), Ceylonese civil lawyer
