= Ananda W. P. Guruge =

Sri Lankan diplomat

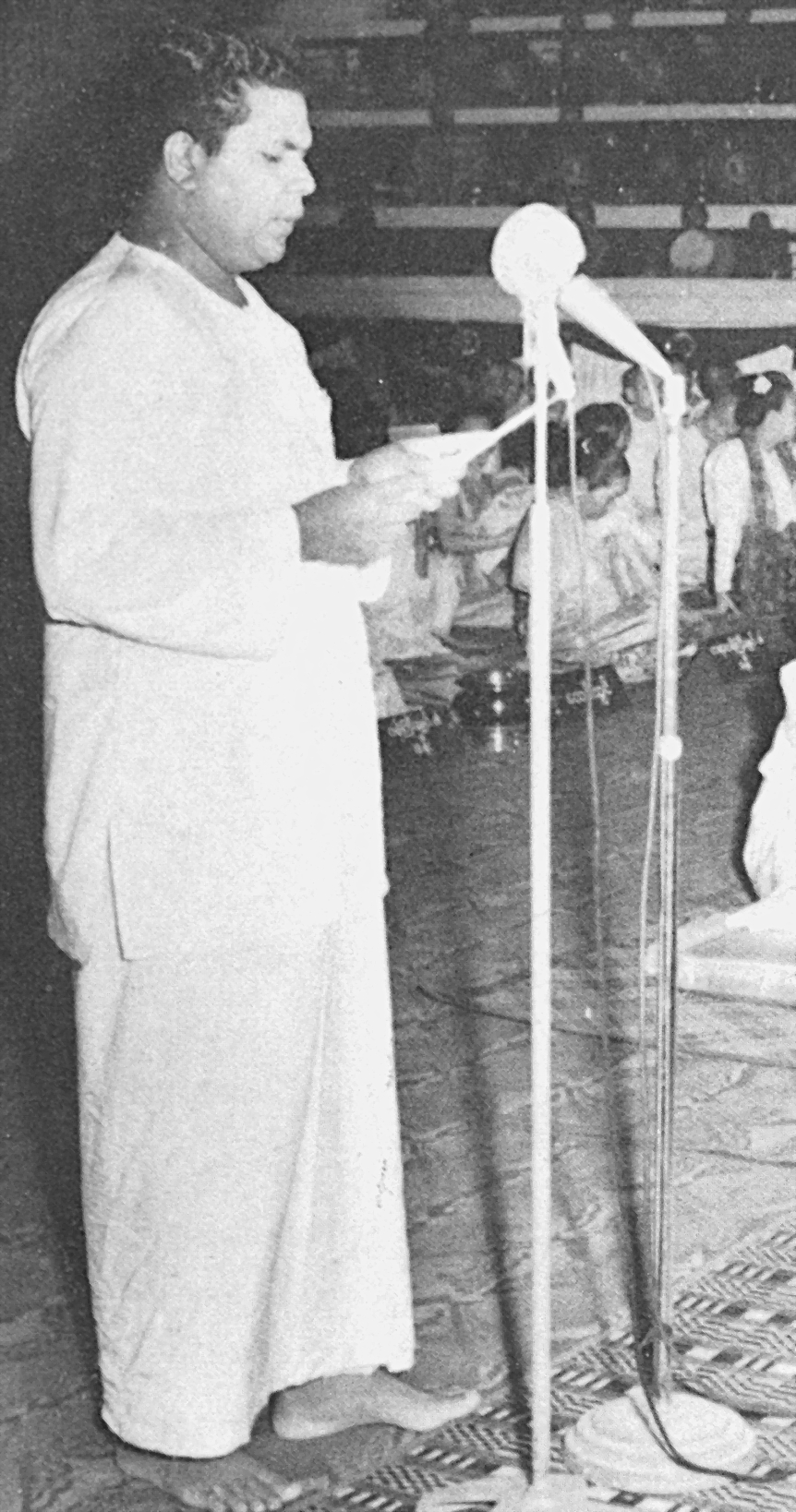
Ananda Wahihana Palliya Guruge, General Secretary of the Lankā Bauddha Mandalaya reads a message from the Prime Minister of Ceylon S. W. R. D. Bandaranaike at the Buddhist Council (Chaṭṭa Sangāyanā) in Rangoon, 1956-04-23.

Ananda Wahihana Palliya Guruge (28 December 1928 – 6 August 2014), known as Ananda W. P. Guruge, was a Sri Lankan diplomat, Buddhist scholar and writer. Guruge was the former Ambassador Extraordinary and Plenipotentiary of Sri Lanka to UNESCO, France, and United States (with non-resident accreditation to Spain, Algeria and Mexico) from 1985 to 1994. Guruge was adjunct professor of Religious Studies at Cal State Fullerton and was the dean of academic affairs at University of the West.

== Education ==
Guruge was educated at Dharmaraja College, and went on to graduate from the University of Ceylon in 1947 with a BA first class honors in Sanskrit special. Thereafter he gained a Government scholarship to do a PhD at the University of London.

== Civil service ==
He joined the Ceylon Civil Service, taking the civil service exam at the age of 23 and was posted to the Jaffna Kachcheri as a cadet. During his career he served as the Head of the Dehiwala Zoo and the Colombo Kachcheri. Eventually he was transferred to the Treasury and from there to the Prime Minister’s Office. From 1952, he served Prime Ministers Dudley Senanayake and Sir John Kotelawela as the senior Assistant Secretary to the Prime Minister, until he headed the government program to celebrate 2500 Buddha Jayanti. Bradman Weerakoon, who was the assistant secretary to the Prime Minister at the time, succeeded Dr. Guruge as senior Assistant Secretary and later Secretary to the Prime Minister. Guruge was appointed the Additional Secretary at the Ministry of Education and Cultural Affairs in 1965.

== Buddhist Leadership ==
Active in international Buddhist leadership, Professor Guruge was Vice President of the World Fellowship of Buddhists, the Patron of the European Buddhist Union, and the Dean of Academic Affairs and Director of the International Academy of Buddhism at University of the West in Rosemead, California. He was also an adjunct professor of Buddhism, Hinduism and Peace Studies at California State University, Fullerton. Dr. Guruge was also the Liaison Officer to the United Nations and UNESCO for the World Fellowship of Buddhists; and was the Chairman of the World Buddhist University Council. He served as an editor of Hsi Lai Journal of Humanistic Buddhism.

== Writings ==
Guruge authored 53 books in Sinhala and English, including What In Brief Is Buddhism, Free At Last in Paradise, Serendipity of Andrew George, Peace At Last in Paradise and The Unforgettable Dharmapala. He also published over 175 research articles on Asian history, Buddhism and education. He also translated the Mahavamsa into English in 1989.

== Death ==
Guruge died in Rosemead, California, at the age of 85. Guruge reportedly died on a flight returning to the United States after assisting with school accreditation in Australia.

== See also ==
- List of Sri Lankan non-career diplomats
- List of Sri Lankan academics
- Notable members of the Ceylon Civil Service
