= Ranjith Abeysuriya =

Sri Lankan lawyer

Deshamanya Ranjith Abeysuriya, PC (1932 - 23 May 2014) was a Sri Lankan lawyer. He was the chairman of the National Police Commission, director public prosecutions of the Attorney General's Department, president of the Bar Association of Sri Lanka and member of the Law Commission of Sri Lanka.

He was educated at Mahinda College, Galle and the Royal College, Colombo before attending the newly established law department of the University of Ceylon along with Lakshman Kadirgamar. Passing the law exams at the Sri Lanka Law College he became an advocate in 1955 and began his practice in Galle. Thereafter he joined the Attorney General's Department as Crown Counsel and in 1968 gained a master's degree in Public Law from the Stanford University. In 1975 he became the director public prosecutions at the Attorney General's Department, however left to join the unofficial bar following political victimization. In 1988, he was appointed a President's Counsel.

In 1991 he was elected as president of the Bar Association of Sri Lanka, followed by the post of president of the SAARC Law. In 1998 he was made a member of the Law Commission and was awarded the title Deshamanya by the Government of Sri Lanka. In 2002 he was appointed chairman of the National Police Commission. He was a board member of the Duncan White Sports Foundation.
