= National Science Foundation of Sri Lanka =

- Established: 1968
- Location: Colombo, Sri Lanka
- Website: www.nsf.gov.lk

The National Science Foundation of Sri Lanka (NSF) (Sinhala: ජාතික විද්‍යා පදනම, ශ්‍රී ලංකාව; Jāthika Vidyā Padanama, Śrī Laṅkāva) was established in 1998 as the successor to the Natural Resources Energy & Science Authority of Sri Lanka (NARESA) established in 1981 and the National Science Council set up in 1968. It was created by the Science and Technology Development Act, No. 11 of 1994.

== Objectives ==
The objectives of the NSF are to initiate, facilitate and support basic and applied scientific research conducted by universities, science and technology institutions and scientists, with the aim to:

- strengthen scientific research potential, including research in the social sciences, and scientific education programmes.
- develop the natural resources of Sri Lanka.
- promote the welfare of the people of Sri Lanka.
- train research personnel in science and technology.

== Divisions ==
The NSF has the following divisions:

- Research Division
- Technology Division
- Science & Technology Policy Research Division
- Science Popularisation Division
- International Liaison Division
- National Science Library & Resource Centre

It also maintains the National Science Foundation of Sri Lanka Digital Repository, a digital library and open access repository.

=== National Science Library and Resource Centre ===
National Science Library and Resource Centre
- Location: 47/5 Maitland Place, Colombo 00700, Sri Lanka, Sri Lanka
- Established: 1998

Other information
- Employees: 10
- Website: Library

National Science Library and Resource Centre (NSLRC) (Sinhala: ජාතික විද්‍යා පුස්තකාලය හා සම්පත් මධ්‍යස්ථානය -ශ්‍රී ලංකාව, jātika vidyā pustakālaya hā sampat madhyasthānaya -śrī laṁkāva) of the NSF is a library, the National Focal Point for the dissemination of Science and Technology Information in Sri Lanka. Its database include the Sri Lanka Science Index (SLSI) and National Science Foundation of Sri Lanka Digital Repository.
