= Lakshman Marasinghe =

Sri Lankan academic, lawyer and scholar

Professor Lakshman Marasinghe
- Born: Sri Lanka
- Education: University College, London; Royal College Colombo
- Occupation: Emeritus Professor of Law
- Employer(s): Government of Sri Lanka, University of Windsor
- Known for: Chairman Law Commission of Sri Lanka, Director of the SCOPP
- Spouse: Rohini Marasinghe
- Children: Leelan Sureni Tarini Irantha Granddaughter Maya Avanthi Marasinghe Daughter in law Ninik Muji Handayani

Professor Lakshman Marasinghe is a Sri Lankan academic and lawyer. An Emeritus Professor of Law of the University of Windsor, he is the current Chairman of the Law Commission of Sri Lanka and was the Legal Director of the Secretariat for Coordinating the Peace Process during the Sri Lankan Civil War.

Educated at the Royal College, Colombo, he went to study medicine at London Hospital Medical College before switching over to study law at the University College, London, where he gained his LLB with first class honours and LLM with distinction in 1961.

After a long teaching career in several universities, he retired as an emeritus professor of the University of Windsor and went on to briefly work for the Sri Lanka Law College in the formation of new courses of study. He is a council member of the Pemberley International Study Centre. He was an integral part in the formation of the first post Apartheid South African Constitution.
