= Ashan Perera =

Sri Lankan social entrepreneur

Ashan Perera අශාන් පෙරේරා
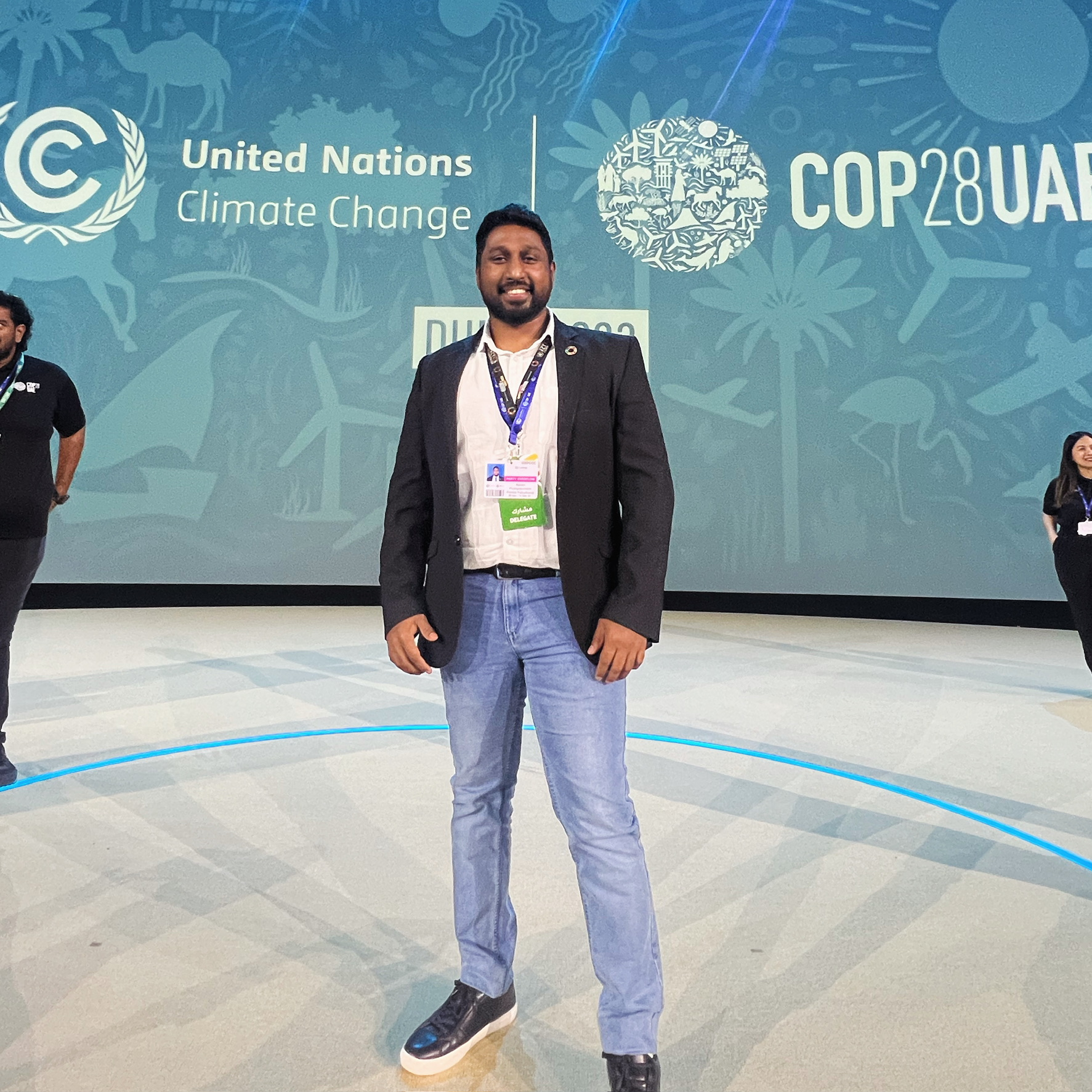
- Perera at COP28 in Dubai, 2023
- Born: R.M. Ashan Pushpakumara Perera; 4 February 1990 (age 36); Piliyandala, Sri Lanka
- Education: Royal College, Colombo
- Alma mater: University of Colombo Institute of Personnel Management, Sri Lanka Bandaranaike International Diplomatic Training Institute Kensley Graduate School
- Years active: 2009–present
- Awards: United Nations SDG Action Award; United Nations People’s Choice Award
- Website: www.ashanperera.org

Ashan Pushpakumara Perera (Sinhala: අශාන් පෙරේරා; born 4 February 1990) is a Sri Lankan youth advocate, social entrepreneur and philanthropist. Founder of the "Road to Rights" youth-led organisation and UN SDG action award winner, Perera has engaged several social activities, speaking at forums, facilitating events, conducting training, contributing to policy papers, designing campaigns and activities for Youth.

== Personal life ==
He was born on 4 February 1990 in Piliyandala as the youngest of three siblings. His father is a mechanic and a businessman, and his mother a housewife. He first attended to Piliyandala Central College and then completed secondary education from Royal College, Colombo. During the school times, he was an active member of many societies and clubs such as UNESCO club, drama society, oriental music society, Interact club as well as in SAGA orchestra. In 2007, he joined with 495 Muthuhara Lama Samajaya. He also excelled in cricket and rugby.

== Education ==
In 2016, Perera completed a National Diploma in Training and Human Recourse Development from Chartered Institute of Personnel Management Sri Lanka (CIPM). Later, he graduated from University of Colombo with a Diploma in Travel and Tourism Economics and Hotel Management in 2016/17. In 2017, he followed a Diploma in Diplomacy and World Affairs in Bandaranaike International Diplomatic Training Institute (BIDTI). Then, he was awarded a Post Graduate Diploma in Strategic Management & Leadership from the Office of the Qualifications and Examinations Regulator (OTHM) in England. In 2020, Perera graduated with master's degree of Business Administration from University of Gloucestershire. Meanwhile, in the same year, he completed Bachelor of Laws degree from Buckinghamshire New University.

== Career ==
At the age of 8, Perera initiated his first ‘Social Group’ called "United Children Association". In 2007, he involved for the documentary The Ethnic Conflict directed by Devinda Fernando. On 22 November 2009, Perera received the Awarded as the Best theater music director at Sarasavi Nirmana All island dram competition which was held at John De Silva Memorial Theater. As an actor, he worked in the university theater for the dramas Edath Ada Wage Dawasak, Sanda Thaniwela and Sohon Gala. Meanwhile, he served as a member of the Senate in the National Youth Parliament, where he represented Sri Lanka at the international level.

In 2009, he founded 'The Road to Rights' International Youth-led Organisation, where he currently works as the president. The organization focuses on value based education, knowledge and skills development as well as sustainable development. Apart from that, he is a director of Chief Strategist & Head of Corporate social responsibility (CSR) at Layer7 Innovations Incorporation, and also in KOLAB Co-working Spaces that are empowering all levels of entrepreneurs from startups to Small and Medium Enterprises (SME). He was also the chairman of Smart Ideas private limited from 2018 to 2019. Perera is also a board member of 'Mithuru Mithuro' Movement. From 2010 – 2015, he was the director of Ferguson Humanitarian Foundation International which was based on Los Angeles, USA.

In 2013, Commonwealth Heads of Government Meeting (CHOGM) Youth forum, Perera involved as a facilitator and an official delegate. Then in 2014, he was the official Sri Lankan delegate and regional contributor for World Conference on Youth. In the same year, he was in chair of South Asia Summit on Youth & Human Rights which was organised as a collaboration with Ministry of Youth Affairs and Skills Development, Ministry of Mass Media, Ministry of Sports and National Youth Council. He also created the G17 University Ambassadors Consortium to combat youth unemployment in Sri Lanka. The program involve 2,000 undergraduates from 74 universities which promotes the SDGs.

On 1 March 2013, he was awarded with the “International Human Rights Hero award 2012” at the 9th International Human Rights Youth Summit held at Brussels, Belgium. The award was presented during the South Asia Human Rights Youth Summit in Chennai in which he was the Sri Lankan speaker. In November 2014, he was selected as one of the Ten Outstanding Young Persons (TOYP) where he received the award for the contribution to Children, Human Rights and World Peace. In the same year, he won the United Nations Friendship Organisation Global Youth Service Award (SUNFO). In 2015, he was awarded with Ferguson Humanitarian Foundation International Humanitarian Award. In the same year, he was selected as the Asia Ambassador and Coordinator of International Youth NGOs Summit. During 11th and 12th International Human Rights Summit at United Nations, Perera distinguished as a guest speaker.

In 2016, Sri Lanka organised international summit and Peace Expo together with Ministry of Sports with the participation of 33 Countries and over 70 delegates. Perera was one of the Sri Lankan participants to the summit. In 2018, Perera received the United Nations SDG Action Award at Global Festival of Actions in Bonn, Germany. He also received the People's Choice Award out of 125 countries. In 2018, he initiated the Gamata Technology, an accelerator platform to reduce high percentage of youth misuse the technology due to lack of knowledge and empowerment.

Apart from various social activities, he has been in part of several volunteer services including, ICC Cricket World Cup Secretariat, Media unit for 2010 ICC World Twenty20, Rotaract club, recycling ocean plastics, drug free world international, Nena Guna Weduma Sisu Diriya educational project, habitat for humanity and Commonwealth Asia youth program.

In 2020, he addressed at the World Summit of Nobel Peace Laureates in drafting the official Youth Declaration of the summit. In 2022, Perera involved in improving the SDGs during the "MY WORLD global survey" for the United Nations. In 2023, he involved as a member of the organising committee of the Sama International Choral festival. Currently, he works as a regional advisor for South Asia in the Climate Action Champions Network.
