= H. J. Wijesinghe =

Harry J. Wijesinghe was a Ceylonese educationist. He was the first Ceylonese to serve as acting Principal of Royal College Colombo.

Born in Ceylon, he was educated at the Colombo Academy and at the University of London. He taught at S. Thomas' College, Mt Lavinia, before becoming a senior master at Royal College, Colombo. With the retirement of principal Lionel. H. W. Sampson, Wijesinghe was appointed as acting principal of the school between 1938 and 1939 until the arrival of E. L. Bradby, who became the last British principal of the college. In 1938, Wijesinghe was able to acquire the Maligawa (town house) of Sir James Obeyesekere, to use as the school's hostel, since for over 80 the school did not have a hostel. The H. J. Wijesinghe Memorial Endowment is awarded at Royal College, Colombo in his memory.
