= Maiya Gunasekara =

Sri Lankan rugby union player

Maithri "Maiya" Gunasekera, FRCS, FICS is a Sri Lankan surgeon and reputed rugby personality. He is a former president of the Sri Lankan Rugby Football Union (SLRFU) and a former Sri Lanka Rugby Captain.

Educated at Royal College Colombo where he captained the first XV Rugby team, he entered the Faculty of Medicine, University of Colombo where he studied medicine and captaining the Rugby team, graduating with a MBBS degree. He went on to gain a Master of Surgery degree from the Postgraduate Institute of Medicine. He is a fellow of the Royal College of Surgeons of England and the Royal College of Surgeons of Edinburgh. Currently he is a Consultant Surgeon at Nawaloka Hospital, Colombo.

Maiya served as President of the Sri Lanka Rugby Football Union in 1998/1999, Chairman of the Sri Lanka Rugby Selection Committee, coach to the Sri Lanka Rugby Team in 1993-1994 and chairman of the National Sports Council

Maiya is the grandson of the late aristocrat and philanthropist Gate Mudaliar L. M. W. Senanayake who, among other things, built Senanayake Aramaya.
