= Dulith Herath =

Sri Lankan entrepreneur

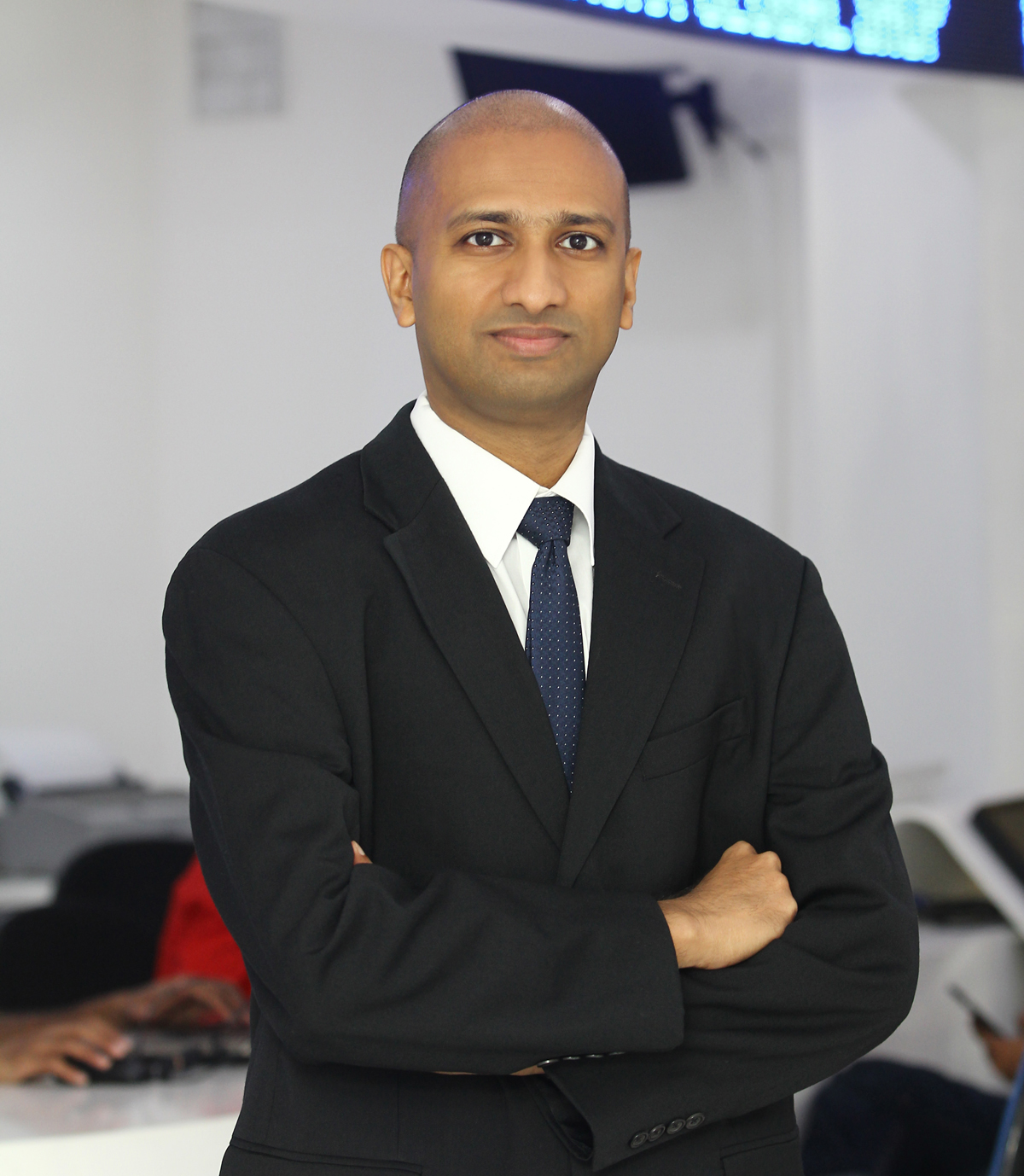
- Born: Colombo, Sri Lanka
- Education: Royal College, Colombo; University of Kentucky
- Occupations: Entrepreneur, business executive
- Known for: Founder of Kapruka

Dulith Herath is a Sri Lankan entrepreneur and business executive. He is the founder and chairman of Kapruka, a Sri Lankan e-commerce company, and a co-founder of Grasshoppers, a logistics business.

== Early life and education ==
Herath was born in Colombo and was educated at Royal College, Colombo. He graduated from the University of Kentucky with a bachelor's degree in computer science. Before establishing Kapruka, Herath worked in the United States as a software professional. He worked at Microsoft and Dell Perot Systems, where he was involved in software and web application development.

== Business career ==
=== Kapruka ===
Herath founded Kapruka in 2002. The company began as an online shopping service serving customers in Sri Lanka and abroad. Under Herath's leadership, Kapruka expanded its online retail operations and introduced services including its Global Shop, which enabled customers in Sri Lanka to purchase products from international marketplaces.

Kapruka Holdings PLC was listed on the Colombo Stock Exchange in January 2022, with Herath serving as chairman and chief executive officer. As of 2026, Herath continued to serve as chairman and chief executive officer of Kapruka Holdings PLC.

=== Grasshoppers ===
In 2016, Herath co-founded Grasshoppers, a logistics service developed to support individuals and small businesses participating in the fulfilment network in Sri Lanka. Herath presented Grasshoppers at the World Summit on the Information Society Forum in Geneva in May 2016.

== Awards and fellowships ==
Herath received the Asia Pacific Young Entrepreneur Award in 2013.

He was awarded an Eisenhower Fellowship in 2017. The fellowship included work relating to entrepreneurship and Sri Lanka's e-commerce sector.

== Controversies ==
In September 2017, Herath came under criticism for remarks made at a forum organised by the Daily FT and the University of Colombo MBA Alumni Association. He argued that increasing volumes of small e-commerce parcels ordered from international platforms should be subject to greater controls to ensure what he described as fair competition for local sellers.

In March 2020, Sri Lanka's Consumer Affairs Authority raided Kapruka during the COVID-19 pandemic, alleging that some essential items were being sold above government-set maximum retail prices. Herath subsequently apologised, saying that the pricing issue was a mistake that had been corrected. The following month, The Sunday Times reported that Kapruka had refunded approximately LKR 1.5 million to affected customers.

In May 2020, customers also complained about Kapruka's Mother's Day products, with reports alleging that some products were spoiled or close to expiry.
