= Dushy Ranetunge =

Sri Lankan journalist (born 1960)

Dushmanthe Srikanthe Ranetunge (born 25 December 1960), commonly known as Dushy Ranetunge, is a Sri Lankan journalist based in London.

== Biography ==
Educated at Royal College, Colombo, the University of North London and the London School of Economics and Political Science (LSE), he worked in merchant banking in the city of London before becoming a journalist.

Ranetunge's foray into journalism was as a result of an accidental meeting with Rohan Gunaratna in London during the late 1990s. Gunaratna was in Scotland, reading for his doctorate in international relations from St Andrews University, where he was a British Chevening Scholar. Gunaratna encouraged Ranetunge, who was in London, to exploit his merchant banking experience to initiate investigations into the financing operation of the LTTE (Tamil Tigers) in London.

Ranetunge has traveled widely following the early rise of LTTE, covering LTTE meetings in the UK, Europe and North America, their proscription as terrorists worldwide and more recently Sri Lankan-LTTE peace talks in Geneva. The early visits covered separatists international Peace Conferences in Australia, Canada and the United Kingdom and other separatist events in Europe organised to raise the international profile of the secessionist movement. Exposure of these events in The Island in Sri Lanka disrupted them.

After the publication of his article "Dinosaurs of the Tamil cause congregate in Ottawa" in The Island in Sri Lanka on 4 June 1999, the secessionists were not able to organise any more international conferences of that magnitude and international participation, as the host countries began denying visa's and deporting participants.

The publication of his article "British Charities fund Terrorists" on 4 October 2000 led to the British Charity Commission raiding the LTTE's premier fund raising vehicle, the Tamils Rehabilitation Organisation (TRO), freezing bank accounts and initiating an investigation which resulted in the TRO being de-listed from the British Charities register.

On 28 February 2001, Britain listed the LTTE as a terrorist organization under the Terrorism Act 2000.

Similar action followed against the TRO in the United States more recently.

Ranetunge has been a fierce critic of the LTTE. From the late 1990s, he has contributed regularly to The Island in Sri Lanka and more recently to the Tamilweek. A Buddhist and a supporter of Sri Lanka, he is freely critical of both. As a result, he has attracted censure from nationalists on both sides of Sri Lanka's ethnic divide.

He has appeared on BBC TV, BBC World Service Radio, BBC Radio 5 and others to discuss politics in Sri Lanka.

== Selection of articles published ==
- http://www.island.lk/index.php?page_cat=article-details&page=article-details&code_title=14819 Are Tamils waving LTTE flags "terrorists"?
- https://web.archive.org/web/20101205054807/http://transcurrents.com/tc/2010/09/kaballeva_in_kandy_rare_photos.html "Kaballeva" in Kandy: Rare photos of a Sri Lankan armadillo
- http://www.island.lk/index.php?page_cat=article-details&page=article-details&code_title=1773 The Great Game
- http://www.island.lk/2010/04/25/features12.html Educating Jeremy Page
- http://www.island.lk/2010/03/14/features7.html Missing the Wood for the Trees
- http://www.island.lk/2010/03/28/features13.html The Politics of Akon,
- https://web.archive.org/web/20100107213052/http://transcurrents.com/tc/2008/10/post_44.html Sri Lanka is a Republic, not a Sinhala country
- https://web.archive.org/web/20110710234026/http://federalidea.com/focus/archives/51 Paranoia and Prejudice Exacerbating Ethnic Discrimination in Employment
- https://web.archive.org/web/20110615153536/http://www.asianewsnet.net/home/news.php?sec=1&id=5283 Mexico refuses to give legitimacy to the LTTE
- https://web.archive.org/web/20110120203114/http://www.dailynews.lk/2007/05/18/fea01.asp Terrorism: What have we learnt?
- http://www.island.lk/2001/03/06/featur01.html Terrorist — the bell tolls for thee!

== Quoted in Research ==
- nationalpost.com Canada Customs and Revenue Agency letter from Elizabeth Tromp, Director General Charities Directorate, Canada Revenue Agency, Ottawa ONTARIO. pages 14 & 15
- https://web.archive.org/web/20061217034152/http://www.rand.org/congress/terrorism/phase2/insurgent.pdf Trends in outside Support for Insurgent Movements, by Daniel Byman, Peter Chalk, Bruce Hoffman, William Rosenau, David Brannan; Rand, 2001
- https://web.archive.org/web/20110606124511/http://www.hinduonnet.com/fline/fl1525/15250570.htm LTTE IN SOUTH AFRICA - Dr Rohan Gunaratna
- http://www.encyclopedia.com/doc/1P2-19211501.html Tigers recruit at British schools, The Sunday Telegraph London | 26 November 2000 | CHRISTINA LAMB Diplomatic Correspondent and CHRIS HASTINGS
- Conflict, Security & Development, Ravinatha Ariyasinha Volume 1, Issue 2 April 2001, pages 25 – 50
- http://www.groundviews.org/2009/04/01/the-needs-of-the-hour/ The needs of the hour 1 April 2009 Colombo, Peace and Conflict, Politics and Governance | by Michael Roberts
- http://www3.qeh.ox.ac.uk/pdf/qehwp/qehwps99.pdf Queen Elizabeth House, University of Oxford, Rajesh Venugopal, The Global Dimensions of Conflict in Sri Lanka
- https://web.archive.org/web/20061217033936/http://www.rand.org/congress/terrorism/phase2/phase2.pdf RAND, Congressional Resource Package, The War on Terrorism Phase II: Home and Abroad
- Article title U.S. Army War College, Carlisle Barracks, Mission from anti-Terrorism to Peace in Sri Lanka, Major General Laksiri Amaratunga, Sri Lanka Army
- https://web.archive.org/web/20110717032736/http://www.bicc.de/uploads/pdf/publications/papers/paper35/paper35.pdf A Preliminary Exploration of the Linkages between Refugees and Small Arms, Bonn International Center for Conversion, Edward Mogire
