= Dhammika Kitulgoda =

Sri Lankan judge

Dhammika Kitulgoda PC

Personal details
- Education: Royal College Colombo; Rahula College Matara
- Profession: Lawyer

Dhammika Kitulgoda is a Sri Lankan civil servant and judge. He is the Secretary General of Parliament (1999–2002, 2008–2012), Secretary to the Constitutional Council and District Judge.

Educated at Rahula Vidyalaya Matara and at the Royal College, Colombo before entering the Sri Lanka Law College for his legal studies in 1971.

Joining the Judiciary in 1975 when he was appointed a magistrate and later served as a District Judge from 1985 in many part of the island. Thereafter he was appointed as Secretary to the Judicial Services Commission in 1998. He was appointed as Secretary General of Parliament from 1999 to 2002 and was reappointed in 2008, thus being the first judicial officer to hold the post.
