= G. L. Sigera =

Sri Lankan general

G.L. Sigera
- Military career
- Branch: Sri Lanka Army
- Rank: Major General
- Unit: Sri Lanka Army Ordnance Corps
- Commands: Master-General of the Ordnance
- Conflicts: 1971 Insurrection, Sri Lankan Civil War, Insurrection 1987-89
- Awards: Karyakshama Seva Vibhushanaya

Major General G.L. Sigera, KSV, SLAOC was a Sri Lankan general, who was the former Master-General of the Ordnance, Sri Lanka Army and Aide-de-camp to President William Gopallawa
