= J. R. Weinman =

Sri Lankan lawyer, judge and legislator (1854–1934)

James Richard Weinman
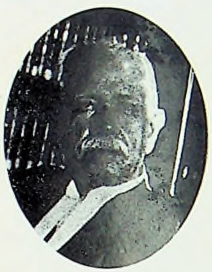

Member of the Legislative Council of Ceylon

Personal details
- Born: c. 1854 Peradeniya, Ceylon
- Died: 19 October 1934 (aged 79–80)
- Spouse: Alice Maude Johnson (m.1883)
- Relations: John Weinman (father); Julia née de Wolf (mother)
- Children: James Coleo, John Johnson, Leonard Owen
- Education: Colombo Academy

James Richard Weinman (c. 1854 – 19 October 1934) was a Ceylonese (Sri Lankan) lawyer, judge and legislator. He was a member of the Legislative Council of Ceylon and had served as District Judge of Colombo.

Weinman was born in about 1854 in Peradeniya, the eldest son of John George Weinman and Julia Elizabeth née de Wolf. He was educated at the Colombo Academy and read law under Charles Ferdinands (the first Solicitor General of Ceylon) and James de Alwis. He served as an Advocate, before taking positions as Commissioner of Court of Requests, Police Magistrate, additional District Judge and then District Judge of Colombo.

== Bibliography ==
- Weinman, James Richard (1947). Our Legislature: Interesting and Racy Reminiscences of Persons and Incidents connected with the old Legislative Council. Colombo, Ceylon: Associated Newspapers of Ceylon.
