= Omar Kamil =

Sri Lankan politician (born 1949)

Omar Zuraik Kamil

Sri Lanka Ambassador to Iran
- In office April 1999 – 2002
- Preceded by: Karu Jayasuriya
- In office January 2003 – 2004

Personal details
- Born: August 29, 1949 (age 77) Colombo, Sri Lanka
- Education: Royal College, Colombo; Chartered Institute of Management Accountants; Aquinas University College
- Occupation: Politician, diplomat, businessman
- Awards: Medal of Merit (Lions International, 2001)

Omar Zuraik Kamil (born 29 August 1949) is a Sri Lankan politician and diplomat. He served as Mayor of Colombo and Sri Lankan Ambassador to the Republic of Iran.

== Early life and education ==
Born in Colombo, he was educated at Royal Primary School (1955) and Royal College, Colombo (1961). He studied management accounting at the Chartered Institute of Management Accountants and business administration at the Aquinas University in Colombo. In Oct-2003, the Open International University conferred on him an honorary doctorate (Ph.D) in political science.

== Business career ==
Kamil did a stint in finance under the tutelage of Chief Accountant P. S. Soosaithasan (later the TULF MP for Mannar in July 1977) at the state-owned handloom and textile manufacturer adjunct to the Ministry of Trade, Sri Lanka State Trading (Textile) Corporation, now Lanka Salu Sala Ltd, Colombo, in which his father MHM Kamil held directorship (1969/May-1970) in the Dudley Senanayake government of 1965-1970. Thereafter, Kamil was inducted into his flourishing family business; the leading hosiers, haberdashers and the parasol people: Messrs WM Hassim in Pettah, Colombo.

== Political career ==
In May 1979 Kamil was elected to the Colombo Municipal Council (CMC) as a member for the Kuppiyawatta East ward in the Borella electorate. He was appointed as Deputy Mayor in April 1997, and succeeded Karu Jayasuriya as Mayor of Colombo in April 1999. In 2001, Colombo City came first among 60-competing cities at the Mayors’ Asia Pacific Environmental Summit in Hawaii. Kamil was appointed by President Mahinda Rajapaksa to serve as Chief City Administrator of the CMC on two occasions in 2006 and 2009/10, and also as Special Municipal Commissioner in 2010/11. On 22 December 2015, the Minister of Industries and Commerce, Rishad Bathiudeen, appointed Kamil as Chairman of the National Enterprise Development Authority (NEDA).

== Diplomatic service ==
In January, 2003, Kamil was appointed as Sri Lanka’s ambassador to the Republic of Iran, accredited to Azerbaijan and Turkmenistan. In the following year, Kamil successfully negotiated lifting the Iranian ban on Sri Lanka tea imports to Iran which had prevailed since 2001. On behalf of oil imports from Teheran, he negotiated the dispensation of prime bank guarantees on letters of credit (L/Cs) established by Peoples Bank for crude oil purchases by the Ceylon Petroleum Corporation (CEYPETCO), prevailing for over 25-years, thereby saving enormous amounts of money in foreign exchange for CEYPETCO. In November, 2004, he pioneered in establishing the Sri Lanka Trade Fair in Teheran where almost 50-companies, which included the Sri Lanka Tea Board and the Sri Lanka Export Development Board, participated.

== Social work ==
Kamil served as secretary at the Moors’ Islamic Cultural Home, Inc. in Colombo, from June 1987 up to 27 August 2008. He was elected as the 4th MICH president on 27 August 2009 and holds that position up to date. Kamil was awarded the Medal of Merit from Lions International in the year 2001.

== See also ==
- Sri Lankan Non Career Diplomats
