= A. Kumaresan =

- Military career
- Allegiance: Sri Lanka
- Branch: Sri Lanka Air Force
- Rank: Air Vice Marshal
- Unit: SLAF Regiment
- Commands: Director Planning
- Conflicts: Sri Lankan Civil War
- Awards: Rana Sura Padakkama; Uttama Seva Padakkama

Air Vice Marshal Arun Kumaresan, RSP, USP, psc, SLAF was a Director Planning of the Sri Lanka Air Force.

Educated at the prestiges Royal College Colombo, he joined the Sri Lanka Air Force as an Officer Cadet in the SLAF Regiment Branch. He also attended the Asia-Pacific Center for Security Studies in Honolulu, Hawaii. After successful completion of Basic Training he was commissioned as a Pilot Officer in the SLAF Regiment. He holds an MSc in Defence Studies and management. Air Vice Marshal Kumaresan has been awarded the gallantry medals Rana Sura Padakkama for individual acts of bravery, the service medals Uttama Seva Padakkama and Sri Lanka Armed Services Long Service Medal.

In his retirement, he has contributed writing to the Colombo Telegraph with articles in both English and Sinhala. He resides in Melbourne, Australia and served as treasurer for the Sri Lanka Ex-Service and Police Association Australia in 2014. He is involved in the Melbourne chapter of New Era for Sri Lanka as a member of the executive board.
