= Neville Jansz =

Neville Joseph Louis Jansz, MBE, CCS was a Sri Lankan civil servant and diplomat. He was the Ceylon's Ambassador to Australia and former Director General of the Department of Foreign Affairs, Ministry of External Affairs and Defence.

He was educated at Royal College Colombo and went to the University College Colombo, then an affiliated University of London. Thereafter he joined the Ceylon Civil Service serving in different positions in government, before being appointed Assistant Secretary and thereafter Director General of the Department of Foreign Affairs in the Ministry of External Affairs and Defence. He was appointed Member of the Order of the British Empire (MBE) in the 1954 Birthday Honours.
