= A. E. Christoffelsz =

Arthur Eric Christoffelsz CMG (born 12 August 1890, death date unknown) was a Ceylonese who served as President of the Ceylon Board of Control for Cricket from 1950 to 1952. Ceylon's Principal Collector of Customs, he was made a Companion of the Order of St Michael and St George in the 1949 New Year Honours. He married Edith Daniels in Kandy in 1927.
