= Tissa Kapukotuwa =

Sri Lankan politician

G. Tissa Kapukotuwa was a Ceylonese politician. He was elected to the Parliament of Ceylon in 1960 in the general election from the Teldeniya electorate.

His father was S. L. B. Kapukotuwa, a well known educationist. He was educated at Royal College Colombo where he played for the college cricket team in the Royal-Thomian.
