= Saman Gunatilake =

Saman Gunatilake, FRCP, FCCP is a Sri Lankan physician, academic and neurologist.

He was a Professor of Medicine with a personal chair and head of the Department of Medicine, University of Kelaniya, working with Professor Janaka de Silva till he was appointed Professor of Medicine at the University of Sri Jayawardanapura succeeding Professor Devaka Fernando. He was a former President of the Ceylon College of Physicians

Educated at Royal College Colombo, he studied medicine gaining his MBBS. He subsequently trained with J.B. Peiris obtaining an MD from the University of Colombo and Board Certification as a Neurologist from the Post graduate Institute of Medicine. He later worked in the UK specialising in Stroke Medicine and obtaining MRCP. He is a Fellow of the Royal College of Physicians as well as a fellow of the Royal College of Physicians of Edinburgh and Ceylon College of Physicians.
