= V. Sivalingam =

Sri Lankan academic and physician

V. Sivalingam was a Sri Lankan academic and physician. He was the founder of the Faculty of Medicine at the University of Peradeniya and the first Professor of Parasitology of the University of Ceylon.

Educated at the Royal College Colombo, he studied medicine at the Colombo Medical College. He specialized in parasitology at the London School of Hygiene & Tropical Medicine of the University of London. Sivalingam spent much of his career at the Colombo Medical College as lecturer and senior professor before moving to Peradeniya after his retirement to set up the 'Second Medical School' in Sri Lanka.

His son, Professor S. Mahalingam, was the former Dean of the Faculty of Veterinary Sciences at the University of Peradeniya.
