= Lucky de Chickera =

Lucky de Chickera is a Sri Lankan novelist and corporate executive. His novel Sarasu…amidst slums of terror was shortlisted for the Gratiaen Prize in 2011. and was nominated for the best novel in English at the state literary awards 2011.

== Early life ==
Lucky de Chickera was educated at Royal College Colombo, being appointed the head prefectof Royal in 1965, and winning the most coveted Dornhorst Memorial Prize for outstanding merit in the same year. He went on to a successful career in the Corporate Private sector of the Country, that spanned 43 years of his working career until retiring as the Managing Director/CEO of Lanka Walltile PLC. Lucky was also an outstanding sports person representing his college in Rugby Football, and then going on to represent the Colombo school sides in 1963 and '64 and the Sri Lanka schools sides in both years. He continued his Rugby career into the Premier Rugby tournament of the Country by playing regularly for the CH&FC RUGBY CLUB one of the leading sides in Colombo from 1968 to 1971. He played for the Colombo clubs in 1968 and was a Sri Lanka trialist in 1968 and '69. He got married in 1969, and fathered three sons, who all went on to play representative rugby at school and junior country level.

Lucky also played basketball and cricket at college and took up swimming in his early adult life. His writing skills blossomed out after his retirement when he found the time to document his many manuscripts and give expression to his numerous travelling experiences.

== Books ==
The books he has authored include;

- Tigress of Kilinochchi
- Poseidon's Wrath
- Sarasu...amidst slums of terror.
- "Pink Elephants 'N Red Roses". A book of short stories brilliantly written in his own inimitable style.
