= Vipula Wanigasekera =

Sri Lankan tourist official

Vipula Wanigasekera is a former Sri Lankan diplomat and public official who has held senior roles in the country's Head of Diplomatic Mission in Norway, Director General of Sri Lanka Tourism Development Authority and Chief Executive Officer of the Sri Lanka Convention Bureau under the Ministry of Tourism. He has later pursued academic, researching, feature writing, and spiritual interests. He is currently a Tourism Consultant, Reiki Healer, Academic in Business Studies and life Counsellor. University of Kelaniya, Open University of Sri Lanka, Plymouth University, UK and Edith Cowan University, Perth/Sri Lanka.

== Education and career ==
Wanigasekera was educated at Royal College Colombo holds CIM (UK), an MBA from the PIM - University of Sri Jayewardenepura, and PhD in philosophy from IIC University of Technology. He has also received training in Carnatic vocal music at the Institute of Fine Arts, London and Reiki Healing at Diemensions, Sri Lanka.

== Career ==
Wanigasekera began his professional career in the private sector, working with international firms including Hecht Heyworth & Alcan (UK), and Deldem Group (Hong Kong) before becoming Director of International Marketing at Sri Lanka Tourist Board in the early 90s. In 1996, he was seconded by the Public Service Commission in Sri Lanka to the Ministry of Foreign Affairs and appointed to diplomatic missions in Malaysia as Counsellor and Norway as head of the Mission. In 1999, he became Sri Lanka's first envoy to Norway as Consul General in Oslo and established country's physical diplomatic presence in Norway. Later in Sri Lanka, he held the position of CEO, Sri Lanka Convention Bureau from 2005 to 2016 with a three-year concurrent post as Director General of the Sri Lanka Tourism Development Authority from 2011 to 2013, both under the Ministry of Tourism. Among many of his functions during this period include Director, World Bank funded sustainable tourism development project and member of Sri Lanka's bidding team for Commonwealth Games in 2018 against Gold Coast Australia and Asian Youth Games in 2017 against three Asian countries. He entered academia full time in 2016 serving Plymouth University UK and Edith Cowan University, Perth. His PhD is in Spiritual tourism in relation to Buddhist philosophy and modern non dual concept. Following the launch of his book Pointers to Enlightenment he began to offer meditation and healing sessions for spiritual seekers based on Non dual and Buddhist teachings.

Wanigasekera is a feature writer for Colombo Telegraph, Mosaic Maldives Advisor to ZeroPlastic Movement and presenter of the weekly Video cast ' Business in 5ive Minutes' on LinkedIn. He has published a book Pointers to Enlightenment and embarked on spiritual work offering meditation and Reiki healing sessions specially for tourists visiting Sri Lanka. He later extended this service to other countries including Australia.

Wanigasekera has been featured as a resource person in spiritual discussions on Buddhist and Eye TV channels. His current you-tubing on spirituality and Reiki healing is attracting a sizable number of spiritual seekers.

== Research ==
- An Analytical Study of Modern Non-Duality Concept with special reference early Buddhist Discourses and their impact on spiritual tourism PhD Thesis.
- Anatomy of Terrorism and Political Violence in South Asia –IDA Journal November 2006 - IDA Paper P-4163 Log: H 06-001530 Online - Management of the Tamil Diaspora–LTTE's primary function abroad
- Behavioral Aspects in Multifaceted Armed Conflicts and their Implications – Sri Lankan Case
- Overcoming Cross-Cultural Differences in Postwar Sri Lanka: The Case of Jetwing-Jaffna
- Pointers to Enlightenment: Truth is Simple
- Dabbling with the Devil
- Increasing Propensity for Corporates to Move Beyond CSR – Case of Zeroplastic Movement
- Futility Of Academic Business Research In ‘Real’ Business

== Public Perception ==
Wanigasekera's career spans public service, business consultancy, tourism and wellness expertise, academia, authorship, meditation and Reiki healing, indigenous therapy, classical music, and digital media on spirituality. This wide-ranging involvement has led to varied public perceptions of his professional focus.
