= Cyril Nicholas =

Captain Cyril Wace Nicholas, MC, KRR (1898–1961) was a Ceylonese soldier, civil servant and forester. He was the first Warden of the Wild Life Department.

== Early life and service ==
Educated at the Royal College, Colombo, he went on to study at the University of Cambridge. However, he left before finishing his degree due to the outset of World War I to join the British Army and was commissioned into the King's Royal Rifles. He became a subaltern and was later promoted to captain. He saw action on the Western Front, winning a Military Cross for bravery in the field. After being wounded in battle, he left the army on medical grounds and returned to Ceylon.

== Governmental service ==
Sitting for the Special Civil Service Examination for War Service personnel, he was placed first on the list but was not appointment to the Ceylon Civil Service on medical grounds. He was accepted to the Department of Excise and became an Assistant Superintendent of Excise in Batticaloa and served in many parts of the island. He was promoted as Deputy Commissioner of Excise. In December 1950, he became the first Warden of the newly established Wild Life Department. A few days before his death the Royal Asiatic Society was about to award him its gold medal. The University of Ceylon awarded an honorary doctorate to him posthumously.
