= Maas Thajoon Akbar =

Sri Lankan judge

Maas Thajoon Akbar KC

Puisne Justice of the Supreme Court of Ceylon

Personal details
- Born: 15 June 1880
- Died: 22 April 1944 (aged 63) Colombo, Ceylon
- Education: University of Cambridge, Royal College Colombo

Maas Thajoon Akbar, KC (15 June 1880 – 22 April 1944) was a Ceylonese (Sri Lankan), judge and lawyer. He was a judge of the Supreme Court of Ceylon and Solicitor General of Ceylon.

Born to M. S. J. Akbar, a wealthy coconut planter, Akbar was educated at the Royal College, Colombo. After gaining a first class division pass at the London Matriculation, he won the coveted scholarship to University of Cambridge: he entered Emmanuel College, Cambridge in 1897 where he did the Mechanical Science Tripos to qualify as an engineer. However, he subsequently switched over to law and was called to the bar at Gray's Inn as a barrister.

He returned to Ceylon in 1905, and while practicing law as an advocate, he also worked as a lecturer and examiner at the Ceylon Law College. In 1907 he became a Crown Counsel in the Attorney General's Department and went on to become the Solicitor General of Ceylon and Acting Attorney General, when C.H. Elphinstone, the Attorney General at that time was away on furlough. As the Solicitor General he was a member of the Legislative Council of Ceylon and had served as a District Judge on occasions too.

He chaired the University Commission and became the first Muslim to adorn the Supreme Court Bench. When he was appointed as a King's Counsel, he was the first Ceylon Muslim to receive the honor. At the time of his retirement he was the senior-most puisne justice.

Akbar was the Chairman of the University Commission on whose recommendation the Legislative Council resolved, in 1928, that the University should be of the unitary and residential type, and that it should be located in the Dumbara Valley near Kandy.

He was the founder of the Ceylon Moslem Educational Society, that established the Hussainiya Boys' School and the Fathima Girls' School.
