= Edmund de Livera =

Edmund de Livera was a Ceylonese journalist. He was the editor of The Times of Ceylon and composer of the College Song of S. Thomas' College, Mt Lavinia

He was educated at the Colombo Academy.
