= Nalin Kulatilaka =

Sri Lankan management academic

Professor Nalin Kulatilaka
- Born: Sri Lanka
- Education: Massachusetts Institute of Technology; Harvard University; Imperial College London; Royal College Colombo
- Occupation: Wing Tat Lee Family Professor of Management
- Employer: Boston University

Professor Nalin Kulatilaka is a Sri Lankan born American academic and researcher. Currently, Nalin Kulatilaka is The Wing Tat Lee Family Professor of Finance in the Questrom School of Business at Boston University and Director of the Impact Measurement and Allocation Program.

He has also held the Bertil Danielsson Professorship at the Stockholm School of Economics and University of Gothenburg and the Tamkang Chair at the Tamkang University.

Educated at the Royal College, Colombo, he went on to gain his BSc from the Imperial College London, SM from Harvard University and a PhD from the MIT Sloan School of Management. Prof Kulatilaka received the Association for Investment Management and Research's Graham and Dodd Award

He is a co-founder of Nine Dot Energy where he is the Chief Strategy Officer. Nalin also co-founded FirstFuel Software Inc. (2009), Glaze Creek Partners (2001), and Lanka Internet ServicesLtd (1994). He sits on the Board of Directors of Assette LLC and NineDot Energy.
