= R. K. W. Goonesekera =

R. K. W. Goonesekera PC

Chancellor of the University of Peradeniya
- In office 2002–2005

Personal details
- Born: 8 May 1928
- Died: 10 November 2014 (aged 86)
- Education: University of Oxford; University of Ceylon; Royal College Colombo
- Profession: Academic, lawyer

Deshamanya R. K. W. Goonesekera, PC (8 May 1928 – 10 November 2014) was a Sri Lankan lawyer and academic. He was the Chancellor of the University of Peradeniya, a Professor and Professor of Law, Ahmadu Bello University and Principal of the Sri Lanka Law College. He specialises in Public Law, Constitutional Law and Fundamental Rights.

Educated at Royal College Colombo, he graduated with an LL.B. from the University of Ceylon in 1954, he was called to bar as an Advocate of the Supreme Court of Ceylon. In 1956 he gained a BCL from the University of Oxford.

Goonesekera served as a senior lecturer of Law University of Ceylon and thereafter served as Principal of Sri Lanka Law College from 1966 to 1974. He became a Professor in Law at Ahmadu Bello University. A founder member of the Civil Rights Movement, Prof Goonesekera headed the Nadesan Centre for Human Rights through Law and became Deputy President of the Bar Council in 1993. He was also a member of the Legal Aid Commission and the Law Commission. He was appointed a President's Counsel and was awarded the title Deshamanya by the government of Sri Lanka.

Goonesekera died on 10 November 2014, at the age of 86.
