= Chandima Gomes =

Lightning protection expert

Prof. Chandima Gomes
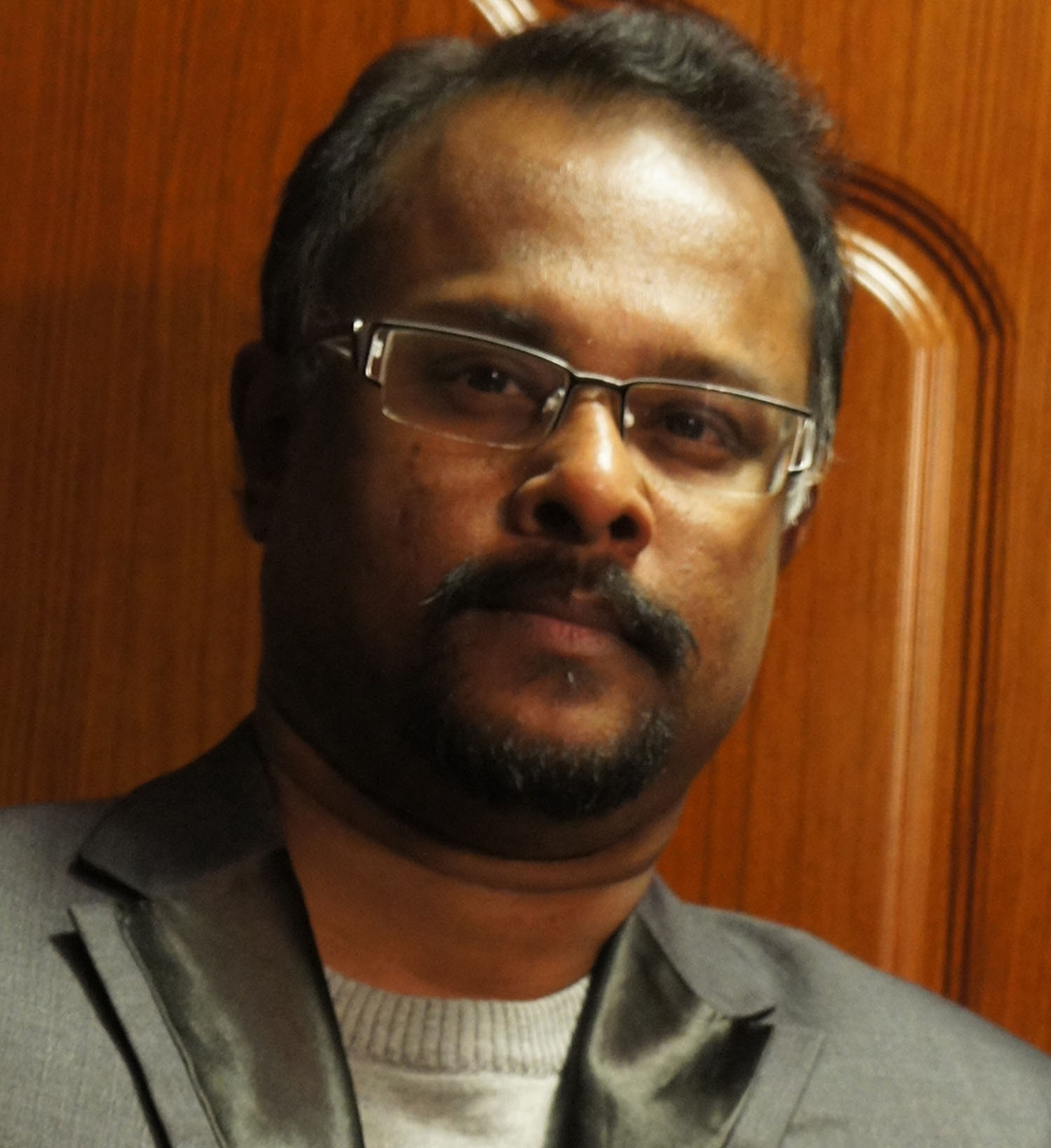
- Born: Colombo, Sri Lanka
- Education: Royal College Colombo University of Colombo Uppsala University
- Occupation: Distinguished Professor of High Voltage Engineering
- Employer: University of Witwatersrand
- Known for: Electrical Engineering Physics Meteorology
- Title: Chair, EPPEI-HVAC
- Spouse: Nilanthi Gomes
- Children: Ashen Indimal Gomes & Amesh Eromal Gomes

Chandima Gomes (Sinhala: චන්දිම ගෝමස්) is a Sri Lankan engineer, physicist and writer who is now working as a distinguished professor of high-voltage engineering at the University of Witwatersrand, Johannesburg, South Africa. He is also a permanent resident of Malaysia. The platform of his research and engineering career is mainly Asia and Africa, where he works on lightning protection, grounding, and electromagnetic interference, on which topics he has put several of his research outputs into practice. Apart from lightning protection and electromagnetic compatibility that reduces economic losses from natural and man-made threats, he has also been working on human and animal safety against lightning mainly in developing countries in Asia and Africa. He is also an engineering consultant and trainer in lightning protection, grounding and bonding, electromagnetic interference and research methodology. He has conducted over 120 training programs all over the world.

== Education and early career ==
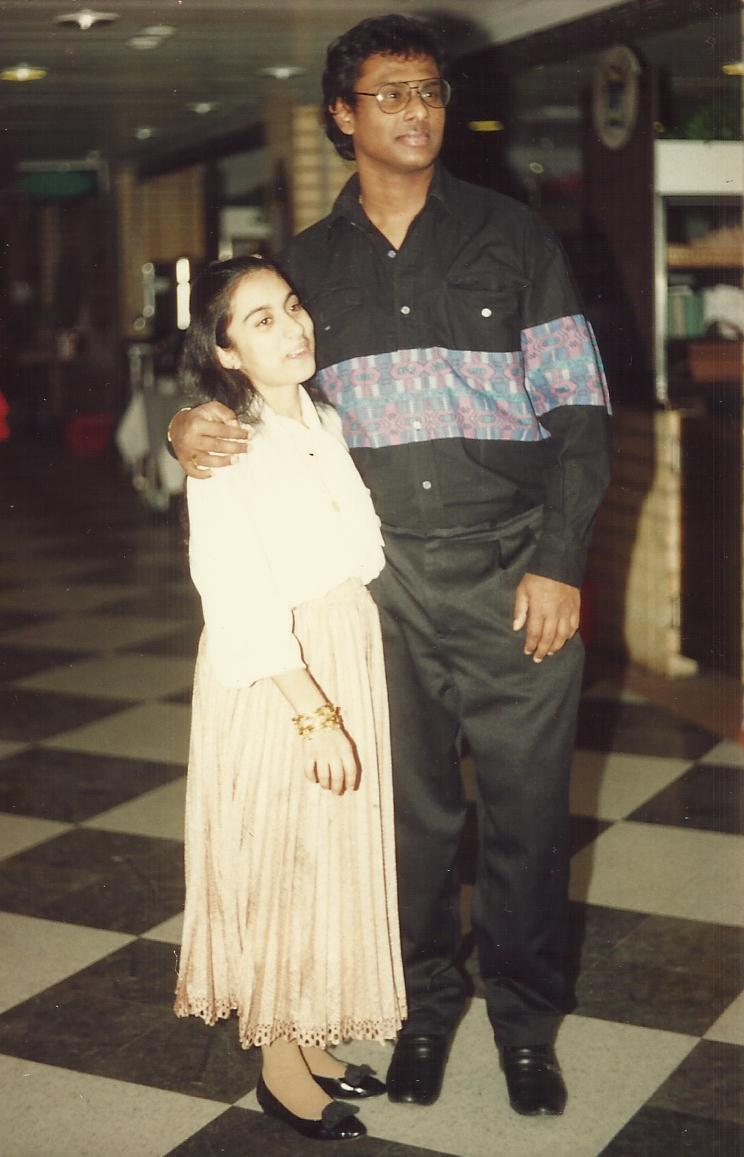
Prof. Chandima Gomes with his wife in Sweden in late 90s

Gorakanage Arosha Chandima Gomes was born in Colombo, Sri Lanka, on 12 September 1966. He had his education up to secondary level at Royal College and then proceeded to University of Colombo, where he studied for a special degree in physics. In 1993 he passed out from UoC with first-class honours degree in the field of physics. Soon after his first degree, Gomes joined the UoC as a lecturer in physics and started a joint PhD program with Uppsala University, Sweden. At Uppsala University, he did research in several fields such as lightning physics, high-voltage engineering, discharge physics etc. under the supervision of Vernon Cooray. In 1999, he received his PhD and returned to Sri Lanka. Chandima is also a chartered engineer and Chartered Physicist registered in the UK.

From 1999 to 2009, while working as a senior academic and a researcher at UoC, Gomes was involved with several projects in promoting lightning safety and protection in the South Asian region. He was also involved with many commissions in Sri Lanka such as being the chairman of the Young Scientists Forum of NASTEC, chairman of the committee on developing National Policy on Lightning Protection, and Sri Lanka Telecommunication Regulatory Commission's National Policy on Antenna Structures.

== Career in Malaysia ==
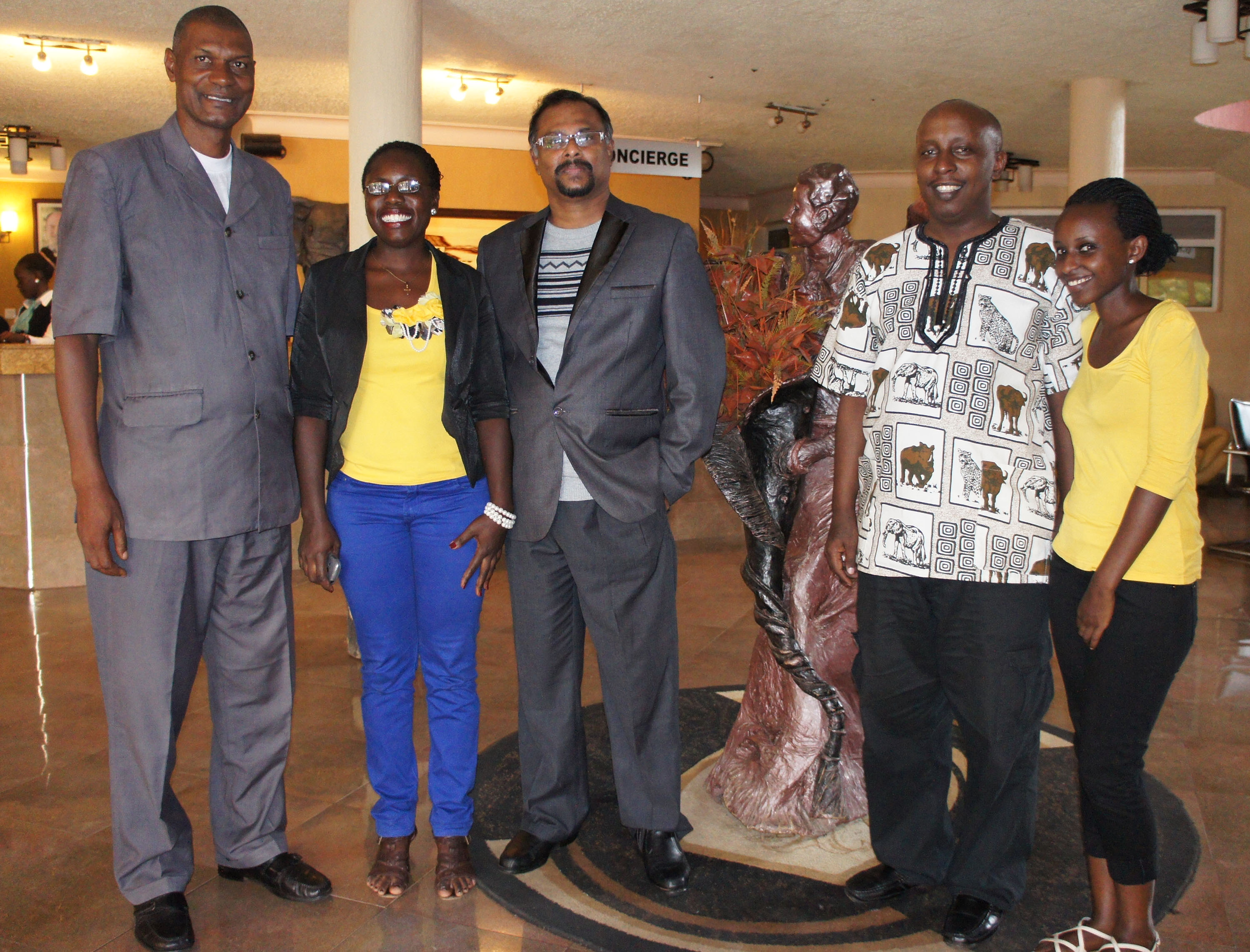
Gomes after a conference in Uganda

Gomes started his career as an engineering consultant in lightning protection and EMI/EMC in the early 2000 and gradually became a trainer on the subject. In 2010 he shifted to Malaysia as a professor of electrical engineering, at Universiti Putra Malaysia (UPM), where he played a key role in establishing the Centre for Electromagnetic and Lightning Protection (CELP) of which Chandima became the first head of the institute. The CELP, the first of its kind in Asia, is dedicated to research, education, awareness and training on lightning-related engineering and physics.

After his work in promoting lightning safety in Asia, he started working in the same line in Africa where the annual lightning death is extremely high. He pioneered in establishing the African Centre for Lightning and Electromagnetics (ACLE), with the patronage of NAM S&T Center in New Delhi and Ugandan Statehouse. He also supported in forming many lightning research and awareness centres established in several countries in the developing world. He also serves as an adviser for many institutes including National Lightning Safety Institute, USA. Chandima Gomes has contributed to a number of research papers published on the lightning safety and protection in Asia and Africa. Chandima has also done studies on the lightning effects on animals, an area which has been hardly investigated.

In November 2018, Gomes shifted to South Africa, becoming the chair of the ESKOM Power Plant Engineering Institute (EPPEI)-HVAC and a professor of high-voltage engineering at the University of Witwatersrand.

== Achievements ==
In 2014, with over 10 years of research, Gomes made an explanation on the lightning protection technology of ancient Sri Lankan Buddhist monuments, called stupa; very large hemispherical/conical buildings constructed 1500–2000 years ago. Although the Mahawamsa, the "Great Chronicle" of Sri Lankan history, written in the first few centuries A.D., has also mentioned that these stupa have been provided with lightning protection by Sri Lankan kings, until Chandima's work there was no scientifically sound explanation given on the methodology.

Ideas depicted in many general articles contributed by Gomes have already been put into practice in several countries.

Chandima Gomes has also authored the Sinhala book "The pathway to be rich" (Sinhala: ධනවතෙකු වීමේ මග), which is now in wide circulation among Sinhala readers in both Sri Lanka and abroad.
