= Ajith Madurapperuma =

Sri Lankan academic

Doctor Ajith Madurapperuma
- Born: Sri Lanka
- Education: University of Wales, Cardiff; Royal College Colombo
- Occupation: academic
- Employer(s): National University of Singapore; University of Moratuwa
- Title: Dr

Ajith P. Madurapperuma is a Sri Lankan academic. Former Dean of the Faculty of Information Technology of the University of Moratuwa, he is currently the Deputy Director of the Interactive and Digital Media Institute of the National University of Singapore.

He was a senior lecture at the University of Colombo and a consultant to the ICTA. Madurapperuma was educated at the Royal College, Colombo and went on to an MSc in computer engineering from the Polytechnic José Antonio Echeverría as well as a MSc and a PhD in computer science from the University of Wales, Cardiff.
