= Asoka Wijetunga =

Sri Lankan judge

The Honourable Justice Asoka Wijetunga

Puisne Justice of the Supreme Court of Sri Lanka

Justice Asoka S. Wijetunga was a Sri Lankan judge. He was a Judge of the Supreme Court of Sri Lanka and Magistrate.

Wijetunga was educated at Royal College Colombo.
