= Wickrema Weerasooria =

Sri Lankan lawyer, civil servant, diplomat, and academic (died 2018)

His Excellency Wickrema Weerasooria

High Commissioner to Australia and New Zealand
- In office 1986–1990

Personal details
- Born: Ceylon
- Died: 4 December 2018 Colombo 05

Wickrema Weerasooria was a Sri Lankan lawyer, civil servant, diplomat and an academic. He was the Permanent Secretary to the Ministry of Plan Implementation, former Sri Lankan High Commissioner to Australia and New Zealand. He served as Sri Lanka's first Insurance Ombudsman.

== Early life ==
Weerasooria studied at Royal College Colombo, where he excelled in Classics, winning the Harvard Memorial Prize and the Governor General's Prize. He graduated with an LL.B. (Honours) degree from University of Ceylon with First Class Honours and was called to the bar as an advocate also with First Class Honours and placed first in order of merit.

== Career ==
He started his law practice and lectured at the University of Ceylon, Peradeniya; the Sri Lanka Law College; the Vidyodaya University (now University of Sri Jayawardanapura); the Institute of Chartered Accountants and the Institute of Bankers.

In 1972 he obtained a PhD from the London School of Economics and became a senior academic at Monash University from 1972–1977. In 1977 he returned to Sri Lanka to serve as Permanent Secretary of The Ministry of Plan Implementation until 1986 when he was appointed the High Commissioner to Australia and New Zealand and Ambassador to Pacific countries such as Fiji, Vanavatu, Papua New Guinea, which posts he held until 1990.

In 1990 he returned to Monash University as an associate professor of law and also served as director of the Banking Law Centre set up by the National Australia Bank. He returned to Sri Lanka in 2002 and worked as a consultant to the Ministry of Tertiary Education and Training and was also a member of the government's Administrative Reforms Committee. During this period he also served as a Legal Consultant in Financial Sector Law Reforms at the Central Bank of Sri Lanka.

Weerasooria published over fourteen texts, most of them on banking, credit and commercial law in Australia and Sri Lanka. He wrote The Law Governing Public Administration in Sri Lanka, the only text on the subject up to date.

== See also ==
- List of Sri Lankan non-career diplomats
- List of Sri Lankan non-career Permanent Secretaries
