= C. L. V. Jayathilake =

Sri Lankan engineer

C.L.V. Jayathilake BSc Eng(Hons) (Ceyl), DIC, PhD (Lond), CEng, FIESL, JP

Chancellor of the Wayamba University of Sri Lanka
- In office January 2002 – April 2013
- Preceded by: W. D. Amaradeva
- Succeeded by: Tuley de Silva

Vice Chancellor of the University of Peradeniya
- In office 1989–1991
- Preceded by: A. P. R. Aluwihare
- Succeeded by: J. M. Gunadasa

Personal details
- Born: Sri Lanka
- Education: Imperial College, London; University of Ceylon; Royal College Colombo
- Profession: Academic, Engineer

C.L.V Jayathilake is a Sri Lankan engineer and academic. He was the chancellor of Wayamba University and the former vice chancellor of the University of Peradeniya.

== Education ==
Jayathilake was educated at the Royal College, Colombo, where he won the De Abrew Memorial Prize. He then went on to graduate with First Class Honours from the University of Ceylon with a BSc in engineering and soon after receiving the Ceylon Government University Scholarship (1960), for best performance at the engineering degree examination to study for a postgraduate Diploma of Imperial College (1963) in thermal process engineering, where he won the Unwin Memorial Scholarship. In 1966 he gained a PhD from the Imperial College, London for research in heat transfer.

== Career ==
Joining the newly established Faculty of Engineering of the University of Ceylon in 1966, he became one of its most senior professors in engineering and the dean of the faculty. Later he was appointed as the vice chancellor of the University of Peradeniya. After his tenure he transferred to the University of Ruhuna as dean of the Faculty of Engineering. He had also served as the director general of the National Institute of Education, Sri Lanka Institute of Advanced Technical Education; was the chairman of the National Education Commission, Presidential Commission on Youth and a faculty consultant of the Colombo Plan Staff College in Manila.

Upon retirement he was made an emeritus professor, and he is a fellow of the Institute of Engineers of Sri Lanka. Later he was the chancellor of Wayamba University of Sri Lanka and chairman of the National Institute of Business Management. Since April 24, 2012, he functions as the chairman of the National Education Commission (NEC)

== Awards ==
- He received the honor of Emeritus Professor from the University of Peradeniya.
- The Government of Sri Lanka awarded the title of Vishva Prasaadini for distinguished national service.
- He is a Justice of Peace

Academic offices
Preceded by W. D. Amaradeva	Chancellor of the Wayamba University of Sri Lanka; 2002-2013	Succeeded by Tuley de Silva
Preceded by Prof. A. P. R. Aluwihare	Vice Chancellor of the University of Peradeniya; 1989-1991	Succeeded by Prof. J. M. Gunadasa
