= Osmund Jayaratne =

Vidya Jyothi Osmund Jayaratne (2 October 1924 – September 2006) was a Sri Lankan academic and politician. He was the President of the Colombo Campus, University of Sri Lanka (now the University of Colombo), Emeritus Professor of Physics. As a left wing politician he was a member of the Lanka Sama Samaja Party playing major role in the Hartal 1953.

Educated at the Royal College, Colombo where he won the Turnour Prize and came second in the island in both the Cambridge Senior Certificate Examination and the London Matriculation Examination. He entered the University of Ceylon in 1942 and graduated with a BSc special in Physics. After spending time in active politics including time as a member of the Colombo Municipal Council, he joined the faculty of University of Ceylon at the Peradeniya Campus. Thereafter he did his PhD in Atmospheric Electricity and Cloud Physics at the Imperial College of the University of London. His thesis supervisor was Prof. Basil John Mason who later became the Director General of Meteorological Office.

Heading the committee to reform higher education in the 1970s, he was instrumental in the formation of the University of Sri Lanka centralizing the administration by bring under it the semi independent campuses that existed under the University of Ceylon.

He was awarded the title Vidya Jyothi from the Government of Sri Lanka and the University of Sri Jayewardenepura awarded a Doctor of Science, honoris causa to him in 1991. He was also the President of the Federation of University Teachers Association.
