= Susirith Mendis =

5th Vice Chancellor of the University of Ruhuna
- Preceded by: Ranjith Senaratne
- Succeeded by: Gamini Senanayake

Personal details
- Education: University of Ceylon, Royal College Colombo
- Profession: Physician, Academic

Susirith Mendis is a Sri Lankan physician and academic. He was the Vice-Chancellor of University of Ruhuna for six years and was the Dean of the Faculty of Medicine. He is a Professor of Physiology and founder Director of the Staff Development Centre.

Academic offices
Preceded by Ranjith Senaratne	Vice Chancellor of the University of Ruhuna	Succeeded by Gamini Senanayake
