= T. Varagunam =

Sri Lankan physician (1930–2018)

Vidya Jyothi T. Varagunam MBBS(Cey), M.D., FRCP, MEd (Illinois)
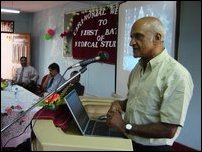

Former Chancellor of the Eastern University of Sri Lanka
- In office 1989–1990

Personal details
- Born: 8 November 1930 Kallady - Upoday, Eastern Province Batticaloa Sri Lanka
- Died: 4 February 2018 (aged 87) Kandy, Sri Lanka
- Spouse: Thayalam née Sabaratnam
- Children: Mira, Radha & Sita
- Education: University of Illinois; University of Ceylon; Royal College Colombo
- Profession: Academic, Physician Professor of Medicine, Faculty of Medicine Peradeniya Sri Lanka
- Prof Varagunam was the Chair of the Division of Medicine at the University of Sri Lanka

T. Varagunam, FRCP was a Sri Lankan academic, physician. He was the Chancellor of the Eastern University of Sri Lanka.
