= S. R. Kottegoda =

Vidya Jyothi S.R. Kottegoda

Dean of the Faculty of Medicine, University of Colombo
- In office 1970–1981

Personal details
- Born: 3 November 1919 Tebuwana, Kalutara District
- Died: 28 February 1995 (aged 75) Rajagiriya
- Spouse: Damayanti Rambukpota
- Education: Harvard Medical School; Oxford University; University of Ceylon; Royal College Colombo
- Profession: Academic, Physician

S.R. Kottegoda was a Sri Lankan academic and physician. He was the Head of the Department of Pharmacology of the Faculty of Medicine, University of Colombo, thereafter becoming Dean of the Faculty, and later National Coordinator, Health Systems Research, Ministry of Health. He joined the Department of Obstetrics and Gynaecology of the Faculty of Medicine of the National University of Singapore.

Kottegoda was a leading authority in the SLAAS on the subject of Ethics in Science, having established the oldest Ethics Review Committee in Sri Lanka.

Kottegoda is also the author of the definitive pictorial guide book ‘Flowers of Sri Lanka’.
