= Lal Jayawardena =

Sri Lankan economist and diplomat

- Born: 1935; Colombo, British Ceylon
- Died: 2004 (aged 68–69); Colombo, Sri Lanka

Academic background
- Education: King's College, Cambridge; Royal College, Colombo

Academic work
- Discipline: Development economics, free trade
- School or tradition: Post-Keynesian economics
- Institutions: World Institute for Development Economics Research (WIDER)

Lal R. Jayawardena (Sinhala:ලාල් ජයවර්ධන) (1935–2004) was a noted Sri Lankan economist and diplomat. He was the first director of the World Institute for Development Economics Research (WIDER) (1985–1993) and Sri Lankan Treasury Secretary in the 1970s. Jayawardena had served as Sri Lankan Ambassador to the EEC, Belgium, Luxembourg and the Netherlands (1978–82) and Sri Lanka's High Commissioner to the UK with accreditation as Ambassador to Ireland (1999–2000). He was an Economic Adviser to the Sri Lankan President and Deputy Chairman of the Sri Lankan National Development Council.

As the Treasury Secretary, he was also instrumental in the reform package that opened up the Sri Lanka economy in the mid-1970s. He chaired a study group on Indo-Sri Lanka Economic Cooperation, whose final report formed the basis of the Indo-Sri Lanka Bilateral Free Trade Agreement (1998). He was also the Second Vice-Chairman of the Group of 24.

Born to N. U. Jayawardena the former Governor of the Central Bank of Ceylon and Amybelle Millicent Jayawardena; he was educated at the Royal College, Colombo, where he was a contemporary of Gamini Seneviratne and Chris Pinto. Jayawardena graduated from King's College, Cambridge in Economic Tripos and went on to gain his PhD from the University of Cambridge. During his time at Cambridge, his contemporaries were Amartya Sen, Richard Layard, Tam Dalyell, Mahbub ul Haq, Jagdish Bhagwati, Manmohan Singh and Geoff Harcourt; he was also a member of the Cambridge Apostles He was married to Dr. Kumari Jayawardene.

== See also ==
- Sri Lankan Non Career Diplomats
- List of Sri Lankan non-career Permanent Secretaries

== Other sources ==
- Squire, Lyn, Priya Raghavan, Sanchari Roy, and Partha Pratim Sahu. "Lal Jayawardena (1934-2004): A Colloquium in Remembrance." (2005): 2026-2028.
