= Kollupitiye Mahinda Sangharakkhitha Thera =

Sri Lankan monk and academic

- Title: Chief Incumbent of the Kelaniya Raja Maha Vihara

Personal life
- Born: Kollupitiya, Colombo, Sri Lanka
- Education: Sorbonne University, University of Delhi, University of Ceylon, Royal College, Colombo

Religious life
- Religion: Buddhism
- School: Theravada

Senior posting
- Teacher: Thalewela Vijitha Dhammarakkhitha Thera
- Based in: Kelaniya Raja Maha Vihara

Kollupitiye Mahinda Sangharakkhitha Thera is the Chief Incumbent of the Kelaniya Raja Maha Vihara and Chancellor of the University of Kelaniya.

== Early life ==
He was born to Mr. Appuhami Dassanayake and Mrs. Podihamine Dassanayake of Kollupitiya, Colombo. He is the fifth in the family of four brothers and two sisters. He received his primary and secondary education at Royal College, Colombo, before entering monkhood.

== Monkhood ==
Becoming a monk in 1968, under the guidance of the then chief incumbent of the Kelaniya Raja Maha Vihara, Most Ven. Thalewela Vijitha Dhammarakkhitha Thera, Sangharakkhitha Thera studied scripture at the Gangarama Temple in Colombo, and graduated from the Vidyalankara Campus of the University of Ceylon studying Buddhist Philosophy and French language. Thereafter Sangharakkhitha Thera was awarded a two-year scholarship to study at the Sorbonne University to gain a postgraduate degree in French language. After which going on to gain a Masters and Doctorate from the University of Delhi.

Returning to Sri Lanka, Sangharakkhitha Thera started lecturing at the University of Kelaniya, Faculty of Buddhist and Pali, later becoming a professor. Sangharakkhitha Thera was appointed chief incumbent of the Kelaniya Raja Maha Vihara in 1992.

Sangharakkhitha Thera was appointed chancellor of University of Kelaniya in 2021.
