= S. Mahalingam (veterinarian) =

Sri Lankan academic and veterinarian

- Born: Sri Lanka
- Education: University of Colombo; Royal College Colombo
- Occupation: Professor of Veterinary Clinical Sciences
- Employer: University of Peradeniya

Professor S. Mahalingam was a Sri Lankan academic and veterinarian. A professor of Veterinary Clinical Sciences, he was the Dean of the Faculty of Veterinary Medicine & Animal Science at the University of Peradeniya. He was the son of V. Sivalingam, who was the founder of the Faculty of Medicine at the same university.

Mahalingam was educated at the Royal College Colombo and went on to study veterinary sciences at the University of Ceylon. He gained his M.A. from the University of Toronto, and in 1968, he received a Ph.D. from the University of Edinburgh, with a thesis titled “Studies on viral infections of the respiratory tract in cattle”.
