= Brendon Gooneratne =

Sri Lankan physician, writer and historian

Brendon Gooneratne (28 March 1938 – 21 June 2021) was a Sri Lankan scholar and physician.

Educated at Royal College Colombo, Gooneratne gained his MBBS (Hons) from the University of Ceylon, Colombo and went on to gain a DAPE from the London School of Hygiene & Tropical Medicine and a PhD from the University of London. He was the first Sri Lankan Doctor to be awarded the Beit Memorial Fellowship for Medical Research.

In a legendary Royal-Thomian match, in 1954, he took 4 wickets for 15 runs and top-scored in the match. In 1956, in Wesley College, Colombo, he took 8 wickets for 18 runs, in a match which was thereafter colloquially known as ‘Brendon Gooneratne’s Match’.

Brendon Gooneratne was a Chairman of the Sri Lankan branch of the international Pugwash group, and Chairman of The Friends Of The Ancient Cities. He was a member of Project Jonah Australia, an organisation which raised awareness of the need for marine conservation and the preservation of the oceans for whales, serving as Vice President of Project Jonah Australia in the 1980s, and President from 1989 to the mid 1990s. The Moratorium on International Whaling in 1986 and the designation of the Indian Ocean as a Permanent Sanctuary for Whales took place during his tenure.

Brendon Gooneratne was author and co-author of several books in his fields of interest, including a textbook on Lymphology, published by Butterworths; ‘From Governor’s Residence To President’s House’; a monograph titled ‘The Epic Struggle Of The Kingdom Of Kandy’; ‘This Inscrutable Englishman’, a biography of Sir John D’Oyly, co-authored in 1999 with his wife, Yasmine Gooneratne; and ‘The Good, The Bad And The Different’, his personal Memoirs, published in 2016. He also co-edited the 1999 Festchrift for Yasmine Gooneratne, And Gladly Wolde She Lerne And Gladly Teche, containing an array of scholarly articles to commemorate her retirement from academic life. He died on 21 June 2021, at the age of 83.
