= Hema Ellawala =

Vidya Jyothi Hema Ellawala

Vice Chancellor of the University of Sri Jayewardenepura

Personal details
- Born: June 1916 Ratnapura, Sri Lanka
- Died: July 2005 (aged 89) Sydney, Australia
- Education: University College Colombo; Royal College Colombo
- Profession: Academic

Hema Ellawala (1916 - 2005) was a Sri Lankan academic. He was the Vice-Chancellor of University of Sri Jayewardenepura and the Dean of the Faculty of Arts and he was an Emeritus Professor of History & Sociology. Hema Ellawala presented his thesis to the University of London in 1962 and awarded a Doctor of Philosophy. His thesis was subsequently published by the government of Ceylon (now Sri Lanka) in 1969. Professor Hema Ellawala's thesis titled, "Social history of early Ceylon" was published by the Department of Cultural Affairs. Following retirement, Professor Hema Ellawala migrated to Sydney, Australia with his family in the early 1980s. Professor Hema Ellawala died in Sydney, July 2005.

Academic offices
| Preceded by | Vice Chancellor of the University of Sri Jayewardenepura | Succeeded by |
