= Lorenz Beven =

Anglican archdeacon

The Ven Lorenz Beven
- Anglican Archdeacon of Colombo
- Church: Anglican Church of Ceylon
- See: Anglican Diocese of Colombo
- In office: 1935–1947
- Previous post: Archdeacon of Jaffna

Personal details
- Born: 30 August 1872
- Died: 11 March 1947 (aged 74)

Francis Lorenz Bevan, MA (30 October 1872 – 11 March 1947) was an Anglican priest in Sri Lanka during the first half of the Twentieth century: he was the Archdeacon of Jaffna from 1925 until 1935; and after that Archdeacon of Colombo from then until his death.

== Professional life ==
He was educated at Royal College, Colombo and Christ's College, Cambridge; was ordained in 1896. After a curacy at St Paul, Kandy he was the incumbent at Christ Church, Kurunegala then St Paul, Pettah before his years as an Archdeacon.
