= U. S. Jayawickrama =

Sri Lankan medical doctor

Upendra Srinath Jayawickrama
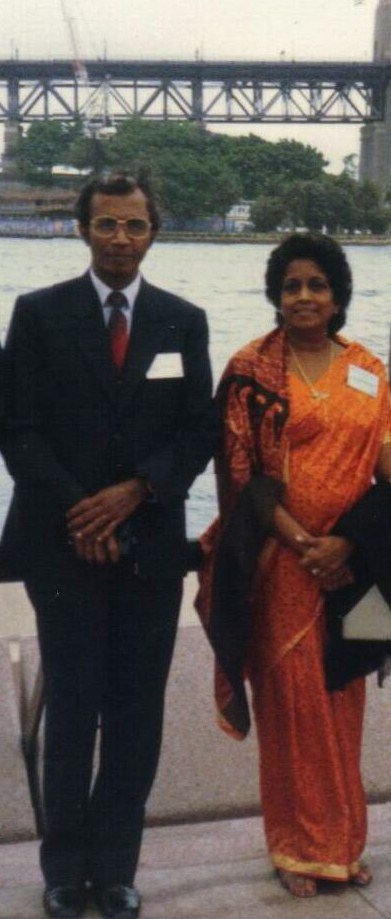
- Jayawickrama and Preani Jayawickrama
- Occupation: Physician

Upendra Srinath Jayawickrama is a Sri Lankan physician (endocrinologist) and an artist. He was the founder of the Diabetes Association of Sri Lanka and a professor of pharmacology at the North Colombo Medical College.

== Early life and education ==
Upendra Srinath Jayawickrama was the eldest of three siblings born into a family of lawyers on 29 January 1930. His father Alfred Sudrikku Jayawickrama was a solicitor practicing in the southern city of Galle, who belonged to a family that included several solicitors, advocates, queen's counsel judges and a minister of justice. His mother Bessie's elder brother T.C.P Fernando, was a district judge while her younger brother, T. S. Fernando was a Solicitor-General, Attorney-General, Judge of the Supreme Court and President of the Court of Final Appeal. Srinath is the brother of Nihal Jayawickrama and Shirani Lecamwasam.

Jayawickrama was educated at Richmond College, Galle until the fifth grade. He joined the science stream at Royal College Colombo thereafter, breaking away from the family tradition of pursuing a legal profession and caused much consternation in the family. He was a prefect of the college, edited the Royal College magazine, was secretary of the Farm Club and won the De Soysa science prize in 1948 and several of the art prizes including the History of Art prize in 1947. In 1949 he entered the Faculty of Medicine, University of Colombo qualifying with a Bachelor of Medicine, Bachelor of Surgery and Doctor of Medicine.

== Career ==
Having spent two years as a trainee under PB Fernando, Jayawickrama travelled to the United Kingdom for further studies, becoming first a Member and then a Fellow of the Royal College of Physicians.

=== Clinical medicine ===
On his return to Sri Lanka he worked in Nuwara Eliya as a visiting physician and in 1970 was appointed consultant physician at General Hospital Colombo (later National Hospital of Sri Lanka), a post he occupied for twenty years, working with colleagues Surendra Ramachandran (with whom he co founded the medical intensive care unit in National Hospital of Sri Lanka), P. T. de Silva, W. A. S. de Silva, and J. B. Peiris until his retirement in 1990. He trained many leading physicians such as the gastroenterologist Janaka de Silva. and endocrinologist Devaka Fernando.

=== Medical education ===
Jayawickrama taught clinical pharmacology and therapeutics at the University of Colombo as an honorary senior lecturer and was later appointed professor of pharmacology in the North Colombo Medical College. He served on the board of study in medicine at the Postgraduate Institute of Medicine and chaired it from 1989 to 1992.

=== Contributions to medicine in Sri Lanka through specialist societies ===
Jayawickrama was the president of the Ceylon College of Physicians in 1983 and was the founding president of the Diabetes Association of Sri Lanka in addition to being a founder member of the Endocrine Society of Sri Lanka. He is chairman of the board of trustees of the Diabetes Association of Sri Lanka. He is credited with being the founder of Endocrinology as a speciality in Sri Lanka.

== Career as an artist ==
Jayawickrama and his wife Preani were artists and sculptors of repute with Preani working with tapestry and Faberge egg replicas and Jayawickrama mainly in copper and wood being well known for portraits in this medium. Well known subjects to have portraits commissioned included Chandrika Kumaratunga President of Sri Lanka and G. L. Peiris.

== Family ==
He is the brother of Nihal Jayawickrama
