= Surendra Ramachandran =

Deshamanya Dr Surendra Ramachandran
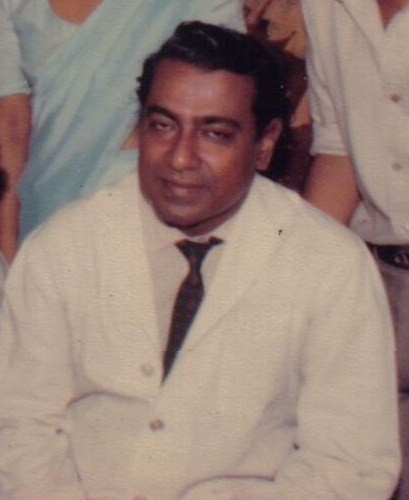
- Born: 1934; Sri Lanka
- Died: 2010 (aged 75–76)
- Education: University of Colombo; Royal College Colombo
- Occupations: Consultant Physician and Nephrologist
- Employer: Ministry of Health Sri Lanka
- Known for: Founder of Sri Lankas First Dialysis Unit, Medical Researcher, Medical Teacher
- Title: Deshamanya Dr

Deshamanya Surendra Ramachandran, FRCP was a Sri Lankan Physician and Nephrologist. He was the founder of Sri Lankas First Dialysis Unit.

== Education ==
Educated at Royal College Colombo, he studied medicine Colombo Medical College now known as Faculty of Medicine, University of Colombo where he obtained first class honours in the 2nd, 3rd and final MBBS examinations with distinctions in Physiology, Biochemistry, Pharmacology, Pathology, Bacteriology, Medicine, Surgery, Obstetrics and Gynaecology. He was awarded the Vaithilingam Gold Medal in Physiology, Loos Gold Medal in Pathology, Andrew Caldecott Gold Medal for the best performance in the final MBBS, Dadabhoy Gold Medal for Medicine and the Perry exhibition for the best performance in the final MBBS.

== Career ==
He was then awarded the British Council scholarship and trained in the University College Hospital, London passing MRCP London, Edinburgh and Glasgow and subsequently became a Fellow of the Royal College of Physicians. He was awarded the Smith and Nephew Fellowship to the UK in 1969, where he trained in the renal unit at the Royal Free Hospital, London.

Ramachandran was committed to performing research throughout his career and much of it was done at a time when there was no formal funding or encouragement from the Ministry of Health, although his primary area of specialisation was nephrology his research reflected the General Medical Practice in rural Sri Lanka at the time and a strong commitment to General Internal Medicine throughout his distinguished career. His research publications covered nephrology, malaria, typhoid, diabetes, alcohol induced disease, Health care in the elderly, hepatic amoebiasis, and leptospirosis.

He worked at National Hospital Sri Lanka alongside colleagues such as Dr J.B. Peiris, Rezvi Sheriff US Jayawickrama and AH Sheriffdeen. He was the founder of the Dialysis unit (with Rezvi Sheriff) and the Medical Intensive Care Unit (with US Jayawickrama) at National Hospital Sri Lanka, the first in a Sri Lankan Government Hospital.

He was a much sought after teacher and students whose research and clinical careers followed in his footsteps include Vidya Jothi Professor Janaka de Silva (research on Alcoholism), Professor Devaka Fernando (research in Diabetes, kidney disease and setting up dialysis units) and Dr Chula Herath (Clinical Nephrology).

== Honours ==
Ramachandran was awarded the Sir Marcus Fernando Gold Medal three times speaking on "Renal Complications of Diabetes", "Hepatic Amoebiasis" and "Problems in Renal Failure", The SC Paul Gold Medal twice speaking on the "Young Diabetic", and "Alcoholism and Drug Addiction" the PB Fernando Gold Medal speaking on "Medical Problems of the Elderly", the Kandy Society of Medicine Oration speaking on "Renal Failure" the Pasupathi Memorial Oration on "Alcoholic Liver Disease" and The E.M. Wijerama Endowment Gold Medal 1999. He was the recipient of 14 gold medal orations

He was awarded the titles Deshamanya and Vidyaj Jothi for his work for the nation by the government of Sri Lanka. He was President of the Ceylon College of Physicians 1990-1991 and The Sri Lanka Medical Association in 1997 with his protege Devaka Fernando a full Professor of Medicine acting as his secretary. Ramachandran is credited with initiating the SLMA foundation sessions, adding an extension to the SLMA building and laying the groundwork for involving the SLMA in World Bank Projects. The University of Jaffna awarded him an Honorary Doctor of Science degree.

== Artistic Talents ==
Like his colleague U. S. Jayawickrama Ramachandran was known not only for his academic and clinical achievements but also for his artistic talents.
