= Senaka Rajapakse =

Sri Lankan Academic and Researcher

- Occupation: Chair Professor of Medicine
- Employer: University of Colombo

Senaka Rajapakse (born 1966) is a Sri Lankan academic, researcher and clinician. He is senior professor and chair of medicine, University of Colombo, Sri Lanka and the director of the Postgraduate Institute of Medicine, Sri Lanka.

== Education ==
Senaka Rajapakse graduated (MBBS 1993, MD 1999) from the Faculty of Medicine, University of Colombo in 1993. He became a member of the Royal College of Physicians in 2003. He completed postgraduate training in General (Internal) Medicine and Intensive care at National University Hospital, Singapore.

== Educational and Professional Activities ==
Senaka Rajapakse is a consultant physician in general (internal) medicine in department of medicine, University of Colombo and honorary consultant at University medical unit, National Hospital of Sri Lanka. He is a Fellow of the Royal College of Physicians of London and Edinburgh, the American College of Physicians, the Ceylon College of Physicians, and the National Academy of Sciences of Sri Lanka. He was President of the Ceylon College of Physicians for 2021, Past-President of Sri Lanka College of Internal Medicine. He is the Regional Adviser for Colombo to the Royal College of Physicians of Edinburgh. He is co-editor of the Ceylon Medical Journal and is on the editorial board of several journals. He has supervised and trained numerous specialist medical trainees and research students. He is the founder member of the Hypertensive society in Sri Lanka and many other medical societies in Sri Lanka. He introduced virtual learning to medical faculty Colombo, obtaining funding and developing virtual learning material for student and lecturers.

From 2014 to 2020 Senaka Rajapakse was deputy director, and from 2020 to 2025 he was Director of the Postgraduate Institute of Medicine, where he brought transformative change to the premier national postgraduate medical training institute.

== Research ==
Since the early days of his medical career he has been involved in research, initially on yellow oleander poisoning, and then tropical infections such as dengue fever, malaria, and leptospirosis. He has collaborated with Oxford University research teams. In addition to the research papers, books and multimedia publications, he has contributed to a widely used medical book, Kumar and Clark's 9th edition. He has an H-index of 46, with over 7000 citations.

Rajapakse has won numerous research awards, including many Presidential Awards for research, the National Science Foundation Research Award for Scientific Excellence in 2017, the University of Colombo award for Excellence in Research 2002, 2011, & 2015, and the Vice Chancellor's Award for Excellence in research 2017. He was awarded the CVCD (Committee of Vice-Chancellors and Directors, Sri Lanka) Most Outstanding Senior Researcher in Health Sciences Award in 2016, which is a lifetime award for excellence in research.

=== Publications ===
- Samarakoon L, Fernando T, Rodrigo C, Rajapakse S. Learning styles and approaches to learning among medical undergraduates and postgraduates. BMC medical education. 2013 Dec;13(1):1-6. (Cited 308 times, according to Google Scholar)
- Rajapakse S, Rodrigo C, Rajapakse A. Atypical manifestations of chikungunya infection. Transactions of the Royal Society of Tropical Medicine and Hygiene. 2010 Feb 1;104(2):89-96. (Cited 218 times, according to Google Scholar.)
- Fernando D, Rodrigo C, Rajapakse S. Primaquine in vivax malaria: an update and review on management issues. Malaria journal. 2011 Dec;10(1):1-2.(Cited 174 times, according to Google Scholar.)

=== Books ===
1. The Demons Within Us: Tales of Medicine & Myth. ISBN 979-8243163811
2. The Cat Who Liked Books.ISBN 979-8181268739
3. Handbook of Critical Care 2009. ISBN 978-955-51749-0-9
4. Case discussions in critical care 2009. ISBN 978-955-51749-2-3
5. HIV and Women. ISBN 978-955-51749-1-6
6. Update on four tropical infectious diseases.
7. MCQs in Cardiovascular Medicine.
8. A Guide to Internship in Medicine.
9. A Primer of Geriatric Medicine, An introduction to geriatric medicine.
10. A Manual for Developing E-Learning Material.
11. National Hypertension Guidelines – Sri Lanka 2003

== Professional affiliations and honors ==
1. President, Sri Lankan College of Internal Medicine 2018
2. President, Ceylon College of Physicians 2021
3. Fellow, Royal College of Physicians of Edinburgh – 2010
4. Fellow, Royal College of Physicians, London Membership
5. Fellow, American College of Physicians
6. Fellow, Ceylon College of Physicians
7. Co-editor, National Hypertension Guidelines Committee, 2001–2003
8. Fellow of National Academy of Science Sri Lanka
