= Rezvi Sheriff =

Sri Lankan physician and nephrologist (1940s–2026)

Vidya Jyothi Rezvi Sheriff
- මොහොමඩ් රෙස්වි ෂෙරිෆ්
- Born: 4 November 1948
- Died: 30 March 2026 (aged 77); Colombo, Sri Lanka
- Education: University of Colombo; Royal College Colombo; Zahira College Colombo
- Occupations: Physician; Nephrologist; Academic
- Employer: University of Colombo
- Known for: Co-founder of Sri Lanka's first kidney transplant programme and dialysis unit; Medical research

Vidya Jyothi Mohamed Hussain Rezvi Sheriff (Sinhala: මොහොමඩ් හුසේන් රෙස්වි ෂෙරිෆ්; 4 November 1948 – 30 March 2026) was a Sri Lankan academic, nephrologist and physician. He served as director of the Postgraduate Institute of Medicine, senior professor of medicine, and head of the Department of Clinical Medicine at the Faculty of Medicine, University of Colombo.

Sheriff was a senior professor of medicine at General Sir John Kotelawala Defence University from 2018 until his retirement. He was a consultant physician and nephrologist at the National Hospital of Sri Lanka, and chairman of Western Hospital.

== Education ==
Sheriff began his formal education at Zahira College, Colombo, and later received a scholarship for Royal College Colombo. He subsequently enrolled at the Faculty of Medicine at Royal College Colombo, obtaining a Bachelor of Medicine, a Bachelor of Surgery, and a Doctor of Medicine. Sheriff was a Fellow of the Royal College of Physicians, London, the Royal College of Physicians of Edinburgh, and the Ceylon College of Physicians.

== Career ==
Sheriff began his academic career as a lecturer in medicine in the Department of Medicine under Professor Kumaradasa Rajasuriya in 1973. He obtained his MRCP after completing his postgraduate training in the UK and returned to Sri Lanka. His academic career in the Sri Lankan university system spanned several decades. He worked with A. H. Sheriffdeen to establish the first transplant programme in Sri Lanka in October 1985. With the support of the Colombo University team, they performed the first kidney transplant in the country. Alongside Surendra Ramachandran, Sheriff contributed to the development of nephrology as a specialty in Sri Lanka. He became Professor of Medicine in 1990, and Senior Professor of Medicine in 1998. By 2015, nearly 1,000 transplants had been conducted under his oversight.

Sheriff was a senior advisory board member to SACTRC (South Asian Clinical Toxicology Research Collaboration) with Nimal Senanayake, Ravindra Fernando and Janaka de Silva. He founded the University of Oxford Colombo for studies on snake bites and yellow oleander poisoning. He served as the president of the Sri Lanka Medical Association, Ceylon College of Physicians, Sri Lanka Association for Nephrology and Transplantation, SAARC Society of Nephrology, Urology and Transplant Surgery and the founding president of the Hypertension Society in Sri Lanka in addition to being a founder of the Health Informatics Society in Sri Lanka and a councillor of the International Society of Nephrology. Rezvi was an External Examiner for MRCP in UK & Chennai. He was the Ceylon College of Physicians Coordinator for MRCP Examinations in Sri Lanka. He was appointed the president of Sri Lanka Medical Association in 2009.

Sheriff was also the founder and chairman of Western Infirmary Hospital in Colombo, a centre for renal disease care, dialysis, and transplantation. In 2011, he was rated among Sri Lanka's most prolific scientists in terms of number of publications, according to the Web of Science database. He published academic articles on nephrology, organ transplantation, snake bites and oleander poisoning.

He retired from the University of Colombo on 30 September 2014, after rendering 41 years of service.

== Controversy ==
In 2019, Sheriff filed complaints with the Criminal Investigation Department over social media allegations that he treated Zahran Hashim, the prime suspect behind the 2019 Sri Lanka Easter bombings.

== Personal life and death ==
In October 2022, Sheriff underwent a kidney transplant at the Western Infirmary/Western Hospital. He died in Colombo on 30 March 2026, at the age of 77.

== Honours and awards ==
Sheriff was an Honorary Fellow of the Royal Australasian College of Physicians, the College of General Practitioners of Sri Lanka and a Fellow of the National Academy of Science of Sri Lanka.

The honour Vidya Jyothi was conferred upon him by the Government of Sri Lanka in 1993 in recognition of his contribution to nephrology, dialysis and transplantation in Sri Lanka. He also received a Lion International Merit Award.
