= A. H. Sheriffdeen =

Sri Lankan surgeon and academic

- Education: Faculty of Medicine, University of Colombo
- Occupations: Emeritus Professor of Surgery and Consultant General and vascular surgeon; chairman Action Care Trust
- Known for: Co-founder of Sri Lankas First Kidney Transplant Programme; founder Vascular Surgery Speciality in Sri Lanka, voluntary worker, volunteer social worker, lobbyist and activist on disability and gender orientation rights
- Title: Deshamanya Professor

Deshamanya Professor A. H. Sheriffdeen is a Sri Lankan surgeon, academic and voluntary worker.

== Education ==
Sheriffdeen was educated at St Andrew's College, Nawalapitiya, St. Anthony's College, Kandy and Faculty of Medicine, University of Colombo qualifying Bachelor of Medicine, Bachelor of Surgery. He trained in the UK becoming a Fellow of the Royal College of Surgeons.

== Professional career ==
Sheriffdeen was Professor of Surgery at Faculty of Medicine, University of Colombo with contemporaries Priyani Soysa, Ravindra fernando and Rezvi Sheriff.

Sheriffdeen is best known for introducing Vascular Surgery and also for establishing Transplant Surgery in Sri Lanka in partnership with Professor Rezvi Sheriff. He together with J.B. Peiris and others described a new clinical entity Transient emboligenic aortoarteritis. He has been chairman of the Ministry of Health Trauma protocols at the Trauma Secretariat, Board of Study in Surgery at Postgraduate Institute of Medicine, President Sri Lanka Medical Association and President The College of Surgeons of Sri Lanka. He has authored biographies of Sri Lankan Surgeons.

== Voluntary service ==
Sheriffdeen has provided leadership and expertise to many voluntary services including ACT Lanka which he is Chairman and is a leading activist in HIV AIDS at National and International level. He has been President and Vice President of the Charity Colombo Friend in Need Society, Chairman AIDEX (Aid to the Ex-Abled) Sri Lanka in addition to Chairing the Jaipur Foundation programme for Jaipur foot users throughout Sri Lanka.

== Honours and awards ==
Sheriffdeen was awarded the title Deshamanya by the Government of Sri Lanka, Honorary Fellowships by Ceylon College of Physicians and the College of General Practitioners of Sri Lanka. He is an amateur golfer of repute.
