= H. H. R. Samarasinghe =

H. H. R Samarasinghe
- Born: Sri Lanka
- Education: University of Colombo; Royal College Colombo
- Occupation: President Sri Lanka Medical Council
- Title: Vidya Jyothi
- Board member of: Chairman Board of Management Sri Jayawardanapura General Hospital

H. H. R. Samarasinghe is a Sri Lankan physician, medical administrator and president of the Sri Lanka Medical Council.

Samarasinghe was educated at Royal College Colombo and Faculty of Medicine, University of Colombo qualifying Bachelor of Medicine, Bachelor of Surgery and later Doctor of Medicine. He worked as senior lecturer in Medicine Faculty of Medicine University of Colombo (and is described as an inspiring teacher). He had a special interest in Neurology and collaborated in research with Nimal Senanayake, then a junior doctor. He returned to Sri Lanka after working in UK and New Zealand and joined the new flagship Hospital Sri Jayawardanapura General Hospital as consultant physician, where he collaborated with Devaka Fernando in research . and setting up a specialist diabetes service and with Dr Chula Herath in establishing a nephrology service.

He was appointed chairman of the Hospital Board by the Government of Sri Lanka, succeeding fellow neurologist J.B. Peiris and obstetrician Nalin Rodrigo at Sri Lanka's only government owned independent Trust at the time. He served as Registrar (CEO equivalent) and later chairman of the Sri Lanka Medical Council.

He is a Fellow of the Royal College of Physicians and the Ceylon College of Physicians. He was awarded the National Honour Vidya Jyothi.
