= Arseculeratne v. Priyani Soysa =

Arseculeratne v. Priyani Soysa is a landmark and controversial case of alleged medical malpractice in Sri Lanka. Apart from being the first such case in recent times, it is also unique because the principal parties to the case were well known professionals of the country - lawyer Rienzie Arseculeratne (Plaintiff) and Emeritus Professor of Paediatrics, Priyani Soysa (Defendant).

== Material facts ==
The plaintiff's three-year-old daughter Suhani, was presented to the defendant with the complaint of dragging of feet. The defendant examined the child and observed involuntary movements of the upper limbs based on which she made a diagnosis of rheumatic chorea and admitted the child to hospital for further management. As there was no improvement in the child's condition after several days of hospital stay, the plaintiff discharged his daughter from the care of the defendant and entrusted her to Professor Sanath Lamabathusooriya, Professor of Paediatrics of the Faculty of Medicine, University of Colombo.

Professor Lamabadusuriya initially concurred with the diagnosis of rheumatic chorea, making an entry in the bed head ticket: "All features of Rheumatic Chorea Seen". He however noted that, unlike in rheumatic chorea, the tendon reflexes were brisk. Two days later after re-examining the child, Professor Lamabadusuriya ordered a CT scan of the brain, since he could not exclude the possibility of a space occupying lesion in the brain.

The CT scan revealed a brain stem glioma (BSG), which is a growth of nerve cells in the proximal part of the brain which houses most of the vital structures necessary for life - hence it is associated with a very poor prognosis. The local neurosurgeons consulted were unanimous in their opinion that the tumour was inoperable. The distressed parents thereafter took the child to the United Kingdom for review by Neurosurgeon Dr. Srilal Dias, who also stated that no surgery was possible in the present state.

The child died a few days after returning to Sri Lanka.

== Legal issues ==
The plaintiff charged that the defendant was negligent in not diagnosing brain stem glioma and in the misdiagnosis of rheumatic chorea. Had a timely diagnosis been made, it was argued by the plaintiff, survival or prolongation of life would have been possible.

Although the plaintiff listed several specialist doctors including Professor Lamabadusuriya as witnesses, only Dr. Srilal Dias was called to give evidence. It was alleged by his counsel that doctors in the country were reluctant to testify against the defendant in view of her esteemed standing in the medical profession.

Dr. Dias claimed that, had the BSG been diagnosed earlier, curative radiotherapy or surgery would have been possible. His claim was disputed by all expert witnesses who testified for the defendant, including the eminent neurosurgeon Dr. Shelton Cabraal. Since the tumour was found in the brain stem region it is extremely unlikely that any form of treatment would have had prospect of cure.

The defendant argued that since Professor Lamabadusuriya too made an initial diagnosis of rheumatic chorea and ordered a CT scan only two days later, she was not negligent in her care. This argument was rejected by the courts, including the supreme court, which held that the defendant was negligent in not ordering a CT scan.

Since brain stem glioma was a terminal condition with no prospect of effective treatment, it was also argued for the defendant that even if her negligence was established, causation had not been proved and as such the plaintiff's action should fail. It was on this ground that the supreme court allowed her appeal.

== The trial ==
The case lasted almost a decade, traversing the full extent of litigation in the country, from the District Court of Colombo to the Court of Appeal to finally the Supreme Court. The District Court upheld the plaintiff's case and awarded him Rs.5,000,000 (around US$125,000 at the time) and costs.

Arseculeratne was represented by eminent civil lawyer President's Counsel Romesh de Silva throughout the proceedings while Professor Soysa was defended by Queen's Counsel Vernon Wijetunga at the District Court, and later by President's Counsel H.L. de Silva and senior lawyer R.K.W. Goonesekere at the appellate courts.

Professor Soysa's appeal to the Court of Appeal was dismissed, however the assessment of damages was reduced as under the Common Law of Sri Lanka, which is Roman Dutch law, damages could only be awarded for patrimonial loss. The Supreme Court allowed Professor Soysa's appeal, setting aside the judgments of both lower courts. In a judgment heavily critical of the decisions of the lower courts, the Supreme Court held that causation was not established on a balance of probabilities by the plaintiff. The defendant was also allowed costs of action, which she declined to accept.
