= P. B. Fernando =

Professor P. B. Fernando OBE FRCP
- Occupation: Physician
- Known for: First Professor of Medicine Ceylon Medical College and Faculty of Medicine University of Colombo
- Title: Professor

Panagodage Bertram Fernando is a Sri Lankan physician who is First Professor of Medicine Ceylon Medical College and Faculty of Medicine University of Colombo. Fernando was educated like Marcus Fernando (no relation) at St. Benedict's College, Colombo. He was awarded a Government scholarship to the Ceylon Medical College in 1918 and qualified with L.M.S. (Ceylon) in 1923. In 1930 he attended University College Hospital, London, M.B. B.S. (1931) and obtaining MRCP in 1932 and the diploma in tropical medicine and hygiene. He was awarded an M.D. in 1951, and elected F.R.C.P. in 1952, the first Ceylonese to be awarded that distinction.

He returned to Sri Lanka to serve as visiting physician General Hospital, Colombo and visiting paediatrician at the Lady Ridgeway Hospital for Children. In 1936 he was appointed the first professor of medicine at the Ceylon Medical College continuing as Professor of Medicine in the Faculty of Medicine when the Medical College became part of the newly established University of Ceylon in 1942 till his retirement in 1959.

Fernando has published research papers on childhood tuberculosis, ascariasis in children, nutritional disorders in childhood, rheumatic heart disease, liver diseases and coronary atherosclerosis and ischaemic heart disease in Ceylon.

He served as acting dean of the faculty of medicine and acting vice-chancellor of the University of Colombo. He was honorary secretary and treasurer of the Ceylon Branch of the B.M.A., and President Ceylon Medical Association (later renamed Sri Lanka Medical Association) in 1953. The Ceylon College of Physicians commemorates his memory with an award of a gold medal Oration delivered at the ceremonial inauguration of its annual scientific sessions.

He is also known for his services to education founding with his wife, the girls school Anula Vidyalaya Nugegoda.
