= Bopage =

Bopage is a surname. Notable people with the surname include:

- Nilantha Bopage (born 1972), Sri Lankan former cricketer
- Nimal Bopage, Sri Lankan lawyer
