= Ravindra Fernando =

Chairman of the National Dangerous Drugs Control Board

Personal details
- Born: Sri Lanka
- Education: Ananda College, University of Colombo
- Occupation: Professor of Forensic Medicine, Consultant Physician

Ravindra Fernando is a Sri Lankan forensic pathologist, toxicologist, physician, author and academic. He is the current chairman of the National Dangerous Drugs Control Board of Sri Lanka.

== Biography ==
=== Education ===
Fernando was educated at Ananda College Colombo and the Faculty of Medicine, University of Colombo where he was active in the Medical Students Union and the Buddhist Brotherhood.

He joined the Department of Forensic Medicine, Faculty of Medicine, University of Colombo, as a lecturer soon after his internship and subsequently trained in the Department of Forensic Medicine, Guy's Hospital Medical School, University of London, on a Commonwealth Scholarship. He was trained in the Department of Neurology in the same hospital and in the Department of Pathology, King Edward VII Hospital, Windsor. He returned to the post of senior lecturer, subsequently promoted on academic merit to a personal chair and being appointed to the substantive chair succeeding Professor Nandadasa Kodagoda. He not only qualified as a pathologist by becoming a member of the Royal College of Pathologists but also qualified as a physician acquiring postgraduate qualifications in clinical medicine by membership of the Royal College of Physicians. He was appointed professor of forensic medicine and toxicology in Colombo in 1996.

=== Professional life ===
He was instrumental in setting up the National Poisons Information Centre in the National Hospital of Sri Lanka, Colombo, in 1988 (the first in South East Asia) and was its head from its inception for 20 years. He was a member of the INTOX program of the International Programme of Chemical Safety (ILO-UNEP-WHO) to prepare a computerized database on poisons, since its inception in 1988. He is a member of the WHO expert group on "Vector Biology and Control." He is a Member of the senior advisory board to South Asian Clinical Tocicology Research Collaboration (SACTRC) (South Asian Clinical Toxicology Research Collaboration) with Nimal Senanayake, Rezvi Sheriff and Janaka de Silva

He has been active in the field of human rights and served as director of the Centre for the Study of Human Rights. He was also appointed chairman of the National Dangerous Drugs Control Board and was a member of the Presidential Task Force on Child Abuse. He has worked as a consultant forensic pathologist, senior lecturer in the University of London and Glasgow. He was also a Home Office pathologist for England and Wales and a Crown Office pathologist for Scotland working in London Glasgow and Sheffield. He was regional secretary for Asia in the "World Federation of Associations of Clinical Toxicology and Poison in Control Centres" in 1990. He has been a member of United Nations and British forensic teams (investigating the Thai Airways crash in Nepal and war graves in Bosnia) He unsuccessfully contested the Panadura seat in the Sri Lankan parliamentary elections

=== Authorship ===
He has published papers in his own field and is the author of 12 books on subjects varying from pesticide poisoning to international relations, the best known works being A Murder in Ceylon: The Sathasivam Case, an account of the 57-day trial of this landmark case in the history of law and forensic medicine in Sri Lanka, and Sri Lanka LTTE and the British Parliament. In a review, Professor Rajiva Wijesinghe described the book and its impact as "a measured account that will help to defuse some tensions that arose when the debate first occurred and it was assumed that this was unwarranted interference by Britishers. After all, with Sri Lankan constituents, it is understandable that British MPs should want to debate the situation. The book will help to make clear the relatively balanced discussion, whilst highlighting areas in which there were misconceptions that must be cleared".

== Awards and honours ==
He is the recipient of numerous awards including the Lion's (Most Outstanding Citizen's Award for Medicine and Health Care), Sri Lanka Jaycees ("Outstanding Young Persons Award for Social Medicine")and a Presidential award in recognition of his services. He was the President of The Ceylon College of Physicians in 1997 and President of The Sri Lanka Medical Association in 2004. He received the Award of Excellence "For the efforts in prevention of drug abuse and support to NGOs in Sri Lanka," at the 20th International Federation of Non-Governmental Organisations for the Prevention of Drugs and Substance Abuse (IFNGO) held in Colombo.
