= 1904 Birthday Honours =

National awards given by King Edward VII

The 1904 Birthday Honours were announced on 9 November 1904, to celebrate the birthday of King Edward VII that day. The list included appointments to various orders and honours of the United Kingdom and the British Empire.

The list was published in The Times on 9 November 1904, and the various honours were gazetted in The London Gazette on 8 November 1904 and 11 November 1904.

The recipients of honours are displayed here as they were styled before their new honour, and arranged by honour and where appropriate by rank (Knight Grand Cross, Knight Commander, etc.) and then divisions (Military, Civil).

== Privy Council ==
Sir Alexander Fuller-Acland-Hood, Bart., Member of Parliament (MP)

== Baronet ==
- Sir Charles Cayzer, MP
- Sir James Fortescue Flannery, MP
- Edward Boyle, Esq., KC
- James Heath, Esq., MP
- Michael Barker Nairn, Esq.

== Knight Bachelor ==
- Theodore V. S. Angier, Esq.
- George W. Baxter, Esq.
- Richard M. Beachcroft, Esq.
- J. A. Bellamy, Esq.
- Henry Cook, Esq., Secretary to the Royal Company of Archers
- John Thomas McCraith, Esq.
- Malcolm McNeill, Esq., CB, vice-president of the Local Government Board for Scotland
- A. Major, Esq.. late Director of Army Contracts
- Charles H. Marriott, Esq., MD
- Shirley F. Murphy, Esq., MD
- Thomas Pink, Esq.
- Professor W. J. Sinclair
- Dr. Joseph Wilson Swan, FRS
- Aston Webb, Esq., RA

Colonies

- William Henry Horwood, Esq., Chief Justice of the Supreme Court of Newfoundland
- Stephen Herbert Gatty, Esq., Chief Justice of Gibraltar
- Walter Llewellyn Lewis, Esq., Chief Justice of the Colony of British Honduras
- The Honourable Alfred Sandlings Cowley, Speaker of the Legislative Assembly of the State of Queensland
- The Honourable William Henry Bundey, late Judge of the Supreme Court of South Australia
- Matthew Henry Stephen, Esq., lately Acting Chief Justice of the Supreme Court of New South Wales
- George Henry Jenkins, Esq., CMG, Clerk of the Parliaments and Clerk of the Legislative Council of the State of Victoria
- Major Allan Perry, MD, Principal Civil Medical Officer and Inspector-General of Hospitals of the Island of Ceylon

== The Most Honourable Order of the Bath ==
=== Knight Grand Cross of the Order of the Bath (GCB) ===
Military Division

- Admiral Sir Compton Edward Domvile, GCVO, KCB

=== Knight Commander of the Order of the Bath (KCB) ===
Military Division

- Vice-Admiral Arthur Dalrymple Fanshawe
- Vice-Admiral Sir Lewis Anthony Beaumont, KCMG
- Lieutenant-General William Purvis Wright

Civil Division

- Sir Arthur Henry Hardinge, KCMG, CB
- William Henry Mahoney Christie, Esq., CB

=== Companion of the Order of the Bath (CB) ===
Military Division

- Major-General William Campbell

Civil Division

- Chief Inspector of Machinery James Melrose, Royal Navy
- Harry Edward Spiller Cordeaux, Esq., CMG, His Majesty's Consul, Berbera
- R. Gundry, Esq.
- Charles Alexander Harris, Esq., CMG, Colonial Office
- The Honourable Charles Algernon Parsons, D.Sc., FRS

== Order of Saint Michael and Saint George ==
=== Knight Grand Cross of the Order of St Michael and St George (GCMG) ===
- Sir Montagu Frederick Ommanney, KCB, KCMG, ISO, Permanent Under Secretary of State for the Colonies and Secretary to the Most Distinguished Order
- His Excellency the Right Honourable Sir Francis Leveson Bertie, GCVO, KCB, His Majesty's Ambassador Extraordinary and Plenipotentiary to His Majesty the King of Italy

=== Knight Commander of the Order of St Michael and St George (KCMG) ===
- John Pickersgill Rodger, Esq., CMG, Governor and Commander-in-Chief of the Gold Coast Colony
- William Grey-Wilson, Esq., CMG, Governor and Commander-in-Chief of the Bahama Islands
- Ernest Bickham Sweet-Escott, Esq., CMG, Governor and Commander-in-Chief of the Colony of British Honduras
- Thomas Ekins Fuller, Esq., CMG, Agent General in London for the Colony of the Cape of Good Hope
- Vice-Admiral Reginald Neville Custance, CVO

=== Companion of the Order of St Michael and St George (CMG) ===
- Captain Robert Archibald James Montgomerie, RN, CB, ADC, late Senior Naval Officer, engaged in the protection of the Newfoundland Fisheries.
- The Honourable Alfred Dobson, Agent-General in London for the State of Tasmania.
- Philip Clarke Cork, Esq., Colonial Secretary of the Colony of British Honduras.
- Charles Gavan Duffy, Esq., Clerk of the House of Representatives of the Commonwealth of Australia.
- Major John Alder Burdon, First Class Resident, Protectorate of Northern Nigeria.
- Francis Watts, Esq., Director of Agriculture in the Island of Antigua, and Analytical and Agricultural Chemist for the Colony of the Leeward Islands.
- Major Dudley Henry Alexander, Private Secretary to the Right Honourable the Earl of Ranfurly, GCMG, while Governor of the Colony of New Zealand.
- Charles Walter Boyd, Esq., Joint Secretary, the Rhodes Trust.
- Mansfeldt de Cardonnel Findlay, Esq., a Councillor of Embassy in His Majesty's Diplomatic Service, attached to His Majesty's Agency at Cairo.
- Colonel Wallscourt Hely-Hutchinson Waters, CVO, formerly Military Attaché to His Majesty's Embassies at St. Petersburg and Berlin.

Honorary

- John Gerolimato, Esq., His Majesty's Vice-Consul at Harar. For services during the operations in Somaliland.

== Royal Victorian Order ==
=== Knight Grand Cross of the Royal Victorian Order (GCVO) ===
- Charles Henry, Duke of Richmond and Gordon, CB, ADC, Colonel, 3rd Battalion Royal Sussex Regiment.

=== Knight Commander of the Royal Victorian Order (KCVO) ===
- Major-General Ronald Bertram Lane, CVO, CB.

Honorary

- Henri Charles Joseph, Marquis de Breteuil.
- Alfred Therese Armand, Marquis du Lau d'Allemand.

=== Commander of the Royal Victorian Order (CVO) ===
Honorary

- Capitaine de Frégate Kimon Jean Lembessis, Aide-de-Camp to His Royal Highness Prince George of Greece.

=== Member of the Royal Victorian Order, 4th class (MVO) ===
- Esme William Howard, Esq., His Majesty's Consul-General for the Island of Crete.
