= Tissa Wijeratne =

Sri Lankan and Australian neurologist

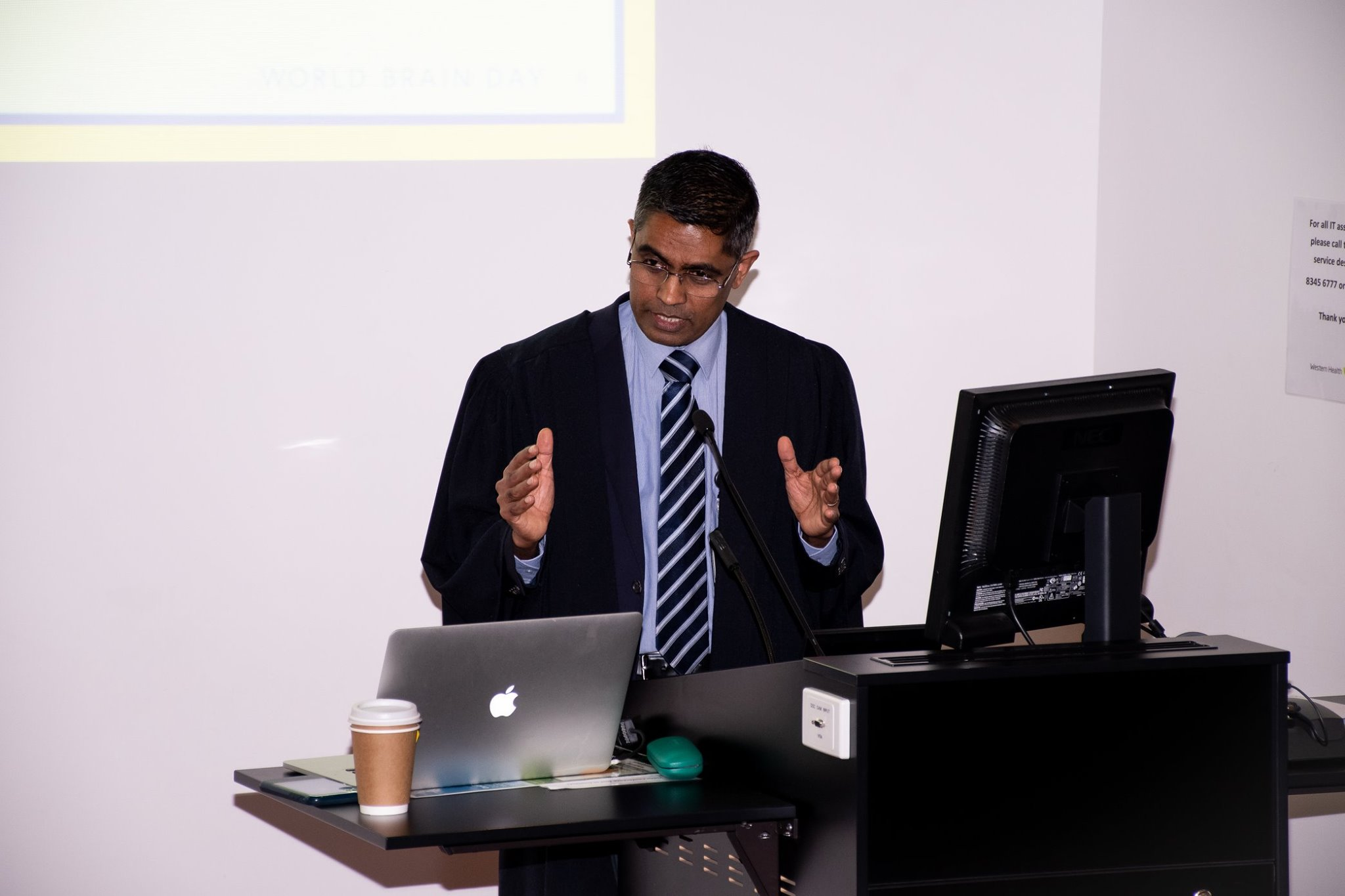
Wijeratne in 2019

Tissa Wijeratne is a Sri Lankan and Australian neurologist, author, academic, researcher, advocate and one of the founders of World Brain Day.

== Education ==
Wijeratne was born in one of the most rural cities (Bandarawela), Uva Province (the poorest province in Sri Lanka, largely secondary to the ethnic genocide in 1815-1816). He attended a primary school that did not have high academic ambitions for its pupils. He missed out on schooling for nine months while he was still a grade nine student at Kirioruwa School, one of the most rural schools in Uva province to date.

He has been an avid reader since the age of five and managed to finish his entire school library as a year one student. Avid reading made him determined to follow an academic course. He was interested in politics from a young age. He delivered the opening speech at the final rally of the Sri Lanka Freedom Party, in front of the world's first female prime minister, the late Sirimavo Bandaranaike, as a primary school student, to a standing ovation in the 1977 Sri Lankan parliamentary election. Wijeratne planned to study economics and politics at university.

Wijeratne completed his high school education at the Bandarawela Central College (also known as the Glendale, commenced as a branch of Royal College, Colombo, during the second world war). As he grew up knowing biology and life sciences at the Bandarawela Central College, he became interested in medicine, and was accepted by the University of Peradeniya, which was interrupted during the 1987–1989 JVP insurrection.

Wijeratne was reborn as a well-known science journalist during this period. He wrote for the science weekly Vidusara, the national newspaper Divaina, the women's weekly Navaliya, and the children's weekly Bindu, then edited by Sybil Wettasinghe. He published over 3000 segments in print media covering brain conditions, agriculture, and global warming with a huge fan base across Sri Lanka. He won the President's award as the best youth national spokesperson in 1989.

Wijeratne first had a career as a young medical student. He was the comperè of major cultural activities at the University of Peradeniya from 1987 to 1994, where national figures in the Sri Lankan music and drama industry appeared. He regularly appeared in television media and national radio media. As a notable old rounder, he went on to perform well at his final year exam with honours in 1995. He was appointed as an intern medical officer to Prof A.H. Sheriffdean for six months, followed by a further six months with Prof. Rezvi Sheriff. Established physicians and surgeons trained him in Sri Lanka. He then created a unique Sri Lankan record as he was appointed as a lecturer in medicine, University of Peredeniya under the mentorship of Prof Nimal Senanayake, a leading neurologist from Sri Lanka.

== Research career ==
Wijeratne was inspired by the original work of his mentor Prof Nimal Senanayake, and continued to learn from his mentor from 1996 to 1999 as a lecturer in medicine at the University of Peradeniya with ample exposure and clinical contribution towards the ongoing work of neurotoxicology under the leadership of Prof Nimal Senanayake.

He met Professor Robert Helme in late 2004 with an agreement to set up the stroke services as a rising star in neurology in 2004 at the Footscray Hospital, Western Health. This was the beginning of Wijeratne's research career. He went on to work in acute stroke care therapies, with landmark contributions in collaboration with his research network across Australia and New Zealand.

== Contributions to migraine and headache research in Australia ==
Wijeratne became a key catalyst for resurrecting headache research and advocacy in Australia. During this journey, Prof. Peter Goadsby and Prof Jim Lance mentored him. Wijeratne became the force behind Australia's re-birth of headache society in 2024. He wrote the original constitution, designed the logo, and set up the first website template for the Australia New Zealand Headache Society. He produced the first film on migraine and disability in Australia. His leadership was the key to establishing the first dedicated charity for migraine in 2018.

Wijeratne and colleagues showed the world that migraine is the leading cause of disability in Australia in a landmark paper published in the Lancet in 2018.

He then led the historic first World Brain Day campaign on migraine. Wijeratne rallied the entire world towards a massive awareness campaign. On 22 July 2019, all ABC stations talked about migraines across Australia.

Wijeratne and his colleagues launched the HEAD research group at the same time. Over five thousand headache admissions across 67 emergency departments across Australia and New Zealand were studied in real-time, with zero research funding support. 14 landmark research papers were published out of this work.

Wijeratne et al introduced two new headache syndromes to the SNOOP-10 classification of secondary headaches with a proposal for SNOOP-12 in 2023.

Wijeratne was appointed as the Section Editor for Stroke, Section Editor for Migraine and headache medicine, Encyclopaedia 2023 Edition in 2021.

== World Migraine Day ==
Migraine Foundation launched the first World Migraine Day on 18 June 2023, with the Five Million Steps campaign. A green colour theme was chosen by the hundreds of people with migraine, as the green colour is most pleasing to the migraine-impacted brain.

== Awards ==
Wijeratne became the only medical student to win the President's Award as the best All Island Youth Announcer in 1989, with an immediate job offer to train as a full-time broadcast media personal at the Belwood TV Village, Nugaliyadda, Kandy, Sri Lanka in 1989.

Wijeratne was the first neurologist to receive the inaugural Ted Munsatt Award, for his contributions in global neurology education and advocacy, in 2017.

Wijeratne became the first Australian/Sri Lankan neurologist to graduate from the award-winning Donald M Pallatuci advocacy program at the American Academy of Neurology in 2008. He later became an advisor and faculty member for the same program. In 2020, he was the first Australian neurologist to receive the prestigious Kenneth Viste Global Advocate of the Year Award, AAN.

In 2019, Wijeratne became the first Australian physician to win the Priscilla Kincaid-Smith Award, recognising the outstanding achievement of a senior doctor who has undertaken pioneering work in medical practice, education or research, preventative health or patient advocacy.

He became the first Sri Lankan neurologist to receive the Medal of the Order of Australia for his services to global neurology, on 26 January 2023.
