= Sri Lanka Medical Library =

The Sri Lanka Medical Library (SLML) is a library which was started in 1844 as the Colonial Medical Library. Later the name changed to Ceylon Medical Library and then to Sri Lanka Medical Library. It is the oldest western medical organization in Sri Lanka.

The library still maintains a large collection of very old medical books and journals in their original form. Even today one could see some of the 16th century medical literature in this place. They are in their original print form. In this present era where everything is turning into digital technology it is really surprising that these original material is maintained in their original format. The library is in fact a Museum of Western Medical Practice in Sri Lanka.

According to Ceylon Medical Journal the oldest medical book in the library is a medical book published in 1608. Being the oldest Medical Library in the country it has the best collection of past journals. It has 10,330 bound volumes of periodicals in 225 titles. These include the following series beginning from volume 1: Ceylon Medical Journal from 1887, Ceylon Branch of the British Medical Association from 1904, The Journal of the Lady Ridgeway Hospital for Children 1951, Brain from 1878, Lancet from 1823, Journal of Pathology from 1893, and Practitioner from 1889.

== Library location ==
The library was originally located in a hospital in Pettah, Colombo and then moved to Ceylon Medical College premises in Colombo. Later it was relocated in the current location in Colombo 7 in Wijerama House. This is the house owned by Dr. E.M. Wijerama (1896–1980) who lived and practiced in Colombo. He gave his house to Sri Lanka Medical Association (SLMA). He had a special request that Sri Lanka Medical Library (SLML) be given space in his house and it should be free of any fee.

== Present day status ==
Each year the SLML allocates most of its funds to get connected to modern medical publications, local and abroad. This is in the form of print versions as well as via on-line. The library subscribes to several hundreds of online medical journals. There is a reading room with internet access for the membership to attend to their research work. The library maintains a list of new arrivals for every calendar year so that the membership is helped in their search. The SLML also provides separate discussion rooms for groups of medical post graduate students.

== Library management ==
The Library is managed by a committee of reputed senior physicians in the country. The library runs according to a constitution. A well dedicated small office staff attend to the daily chores. The library expenses are met by donations given by the state, private organisations and individuals.

== Library contact ==
Sri Lanka Medical Library,
6, Wijerama Mawatha,
Colombo 7,
00700,
Sri Lanka
