= Nimal Senanayake =

- Occupations: Professor of Medicine, Consultant Neurologist, Medical Researcher, Author, Film and Television Scriptwriter
- Title: Professor

Professor Nimal Senanayake is a Sri Lankan neurologist, physician, author, film and television scriptwriter and academic.

== Education ==
Senanayake was educated at the University of Peradeniya. He trained at the Professorial medical unit at General Hospital Colombo, working alongside HHR Samarasinghe and Kumaradasa Rajasuriya. After training in the UK and obtaining his MRCP he was appointed Senior Lecturer in Medicine. He was subsequently promoted to Professor of Medicine and Dean of the Faculty of Medicine at the University of Peradeniya.

== Professional career ==
Senanayake has served as Chairman of Board of Study in Medicine at the Postgraduate Institute of Medicine, President of the Sri Lanka Medical Association and President of the Kandy Society of Medicine. He mentored number of leading clinician scientists to the world with one of the most notable being Prof Tissa Wijeratne, Chair, Public Awareness and Advocacy, Tissa Wijeratne World Federation of Neurology during his early years as a neurology and internal medicine trainee from 1996–1999.

== Contributions to Research ==
Senanayake is best known for his work on the neurotoxicity of pesticides and particularly organophosphorous compounds but has published extensively where he is regarded to have coined the term "Intermediate Syndrome", a clinical phase of Organophosphate poisoning. and is an authority on epilepsy and other neurological disorders. He currently leads with an Australian colleague a Wellcome Trust funded initiative to reduce deaths from pesticides.

== Literary and Artistic contributions ==
Senanayake is an author of non medical books and a scriptwriter as well as a scientific researcher, and has scripted several television dramas and documentaries shown on national television. One of the famous teledrama is "Ella langa walawwa" that was initially broadcast in 1988. The work has a strong bias towards medical issues such as psychoanalysis and living with epilepsy but draws on adaptations of work by Maupassant and Wilkie Collins., He is also a vocalist, and has performed at several venues.

== Honours and awards ==
He has received awards for contributions to research (SLMA Gold Medal Oration, Kandy Society of Medicine Gold Medal Oration, Senaka Bibile Gold Medal Oration, Kumaradasa Rajasuriya Gold Medal) and scriptwriting. He was awarded a DSc by the university in recognition of his achievements in the field of Toxicology and Neurology. He is a Fellow of the Royal College of Physicians
