= P. T. de Silva =

Sri Lankan physician (1929–2015)

Deshabandu P. T. de Silva MBBS, MD, FRCP
- Born: Primus Tilakaratne de Silva; 19 September 1929; Chilaw, Sri Lanka
- Died: 28 February 2015 (aged 85); Colombo Sri Lanka
- Education: Nalanda College Colombo; University of Colombo
- Occupation: Senior Consultant Physician
- Known for: President Ceylon College of Physicians
- Spouse: Kusuma née Weerasekera
- Children: Janaka, Asita

Primus Tilakaratne de Silva (Sinhala: පී. ටී ද සිල්වා; 19 September 1929 – 28 February 2015) was a well known physician in Sri Lanka.

== Biography ==
Primus Tilakaratne de Silva was born on 19 September 1929 in Mahawewa, Chilaw to traditional Buddhist parents. He received his primary and secondary education at Nalanda College, Colombo. He then entered the Colombo Medical College from where he received Bachelor of Medicine, Bachelor of Surgery and Doctor of Medicine degrees. He had his postgraduate training at University College and Hammersmith hospitals in London, and obtained membership of the Royal College of Physicians of London.

=== Career ===
De Silva returned to Sri Lanka and worked briefly at the Jaffna and Colombo South General Hospitals until he was appointed as consultant physician to the General Hospital, Colombo, where he served for nearly 20 years. In 1984 he was elected as President of Ceylon College of Physicians. A very popular clinical teacher, a gold medal for Clinical Medicine is awarded in his name by the Postgraduate Institute of Medicine, University of Colombo (PGIM).

De Silva was one of a small group of pioneering physicians who initiated medical intensive care services in Sri Lanka, helping to set up Medical Intensive Care Units at the Colombo General Hospital and at Nawaloka Hospital, a leading private hospital in Colombo. He was also one of the first physicians in the country to perform gastrointestinal endoscopy, which at that time was practiced almost exclusively by surgeons.

De Silva was one of the founding members of the Board of Study in Medicine of the PGIM. He was chairman of the Board of Management of the PGIM in 1997–1998. In 1998, he was awarded the national titular honour Deshabandu by the President of Sri Lanka.

=== Personal ===
His first son Janaka is a professor of medicine and his second son Asita is a professor of pharmacology; both have been awarded the national titular honour Vidyajyothi.

De Silva died on 28 February 2015 aged 85.
