= List of Sri Lankan non-career Permanent Secretaries =

This is a list of Sri Lankan non-career Permanent Secretaries; they are from different professions. The list includes doctors, engineers, journalists, professional politicians, university lecturers, lawyers, journalists, defence officers, and people in the planning service, education administration service, agriculture service, and accounting service.

== Academics ==
- Nimal Bopage - Permanent Secretary to the Ministry of Parliamentary Reforms and Mass Media
- Charitha Herath - Permanent Secretary to the Ministry of Mass Media and Information
- Professor Stanley Kalpage - Permanent Secretary to the Ministry of Higher Education
- Dr Wickrema Weerasooria - Permanent Secretary to the Ministry of Plan Implementation
- Professor Rajiva Wijesinha - Permanent Secretary to the Ministry of Disaster Management and Human Rights

== Businesspeople ==
- Dhammika Perera - Permanent Secretary to the Ministry of Transport

== Economists ==
- Dr Deshamanya Gamani Corea - Permanent Secretary to the Ministry of Planning and Economic Affairs
- Dr P.B. Jayasundara - Permanent Secretary of the Treasury and the Ministry of Finance & Planning
- Dr Lal Jayawardena - Permanent Secretary to the Ministry of Finance
- A. S. Jayawardene - Permanent Secretary to the Ministry of Industries, Scientific Affairs and Finance
- Dr Jayantha Kelegama - Permanent Secretary to the Ministry of External and Internal Trade

== Lawyers ==
- Suhada Gamlath - Permanent Secretary of the Ministry of Justice and Law Reforms
- Nihal Jayawickrama - Permanent Secretary of the Ministry of Justice and Law Reforms
- Dr. Palitha Kohona - Permanent Secretary to the Ministry of Foreign Affairs
- Charitha Ratwatte - Permanent Secretary of the Treasury and the Ministries of Finance, Youth Affairs & Employment

== Media personalities and journalists ==
- Dr Anandatissa de Alwis - Permanent Secretary to the Ministry of State (1965–1970)
- Karunaratna Paranavtana - Permanent Secretary to the Ministry of Media and Information

== Military officers ==
- General Deshamanya D. S. Attygalle - Permanent Secretary to the Ministry of Defence
- Admiral Jayanath Colombage - Permanent Secretary to the Ministry of Foreign Affairs
- Colonel C. A. Dharmapala, ED, CLI - Permanent Secretary to the Ministry of Defence
- Major General Kamal Gunaratne - Permanent Secretary to the Ministry of Defence
- Brigadier Dennis Hapugalle - Permanent Secretary to the Ministry of Internal Security
- Major General Asoka Jayawardena - Permanent Secretary to the Ministry of Defence
- Admiral Wasantha Karannagoda - Permanent Secretary to the Ministry of Highways
- General Shantha Kottegoda - Permanent Secretary to the Ministry of Defence
- Major General Nanda Mallawaarachchi - Permanent Secretary to the Ministry of Law and Order
- Major General Sanjeewa Munasinghe - Permanent Secretary to the Ministry of Health
- Major General Sumedha Perera - Permanent Secretary to the Ministry of Agriculture
- Lieutenant Colonel Gotabhaya Rajapaksa - Permanent Secretary to the Ministry of Defence and Urban Development
- General Cyril Ranatunge - Permanent Secretary to the Ministry of Defence
- General Daya Ratnayake - Permanent Secretary to the Ministry of Industries
- Air Vice-Marshal Sampath Thuyacontha (24 September 2024–present)
- General Hamilton Wanasinghe - Permanent Secretary to the Ministry of Defence

== Police officers ==
- Sydney de Zoysa - Permanent Secretary to the Ministry of Internal Security
- Cyril Herath - Permanent Secretary to the Ministry of Defence

== Planters ==
- Ranjan Wijeratne - Permanent Secretary to the Ministry of Agricultural Development and Research

== Uncategorized ==
- Hemasiri Fernando - Permanent Secretary to Ministry of Defence
