= National Research Council of Sri Lanka =

Funding agency

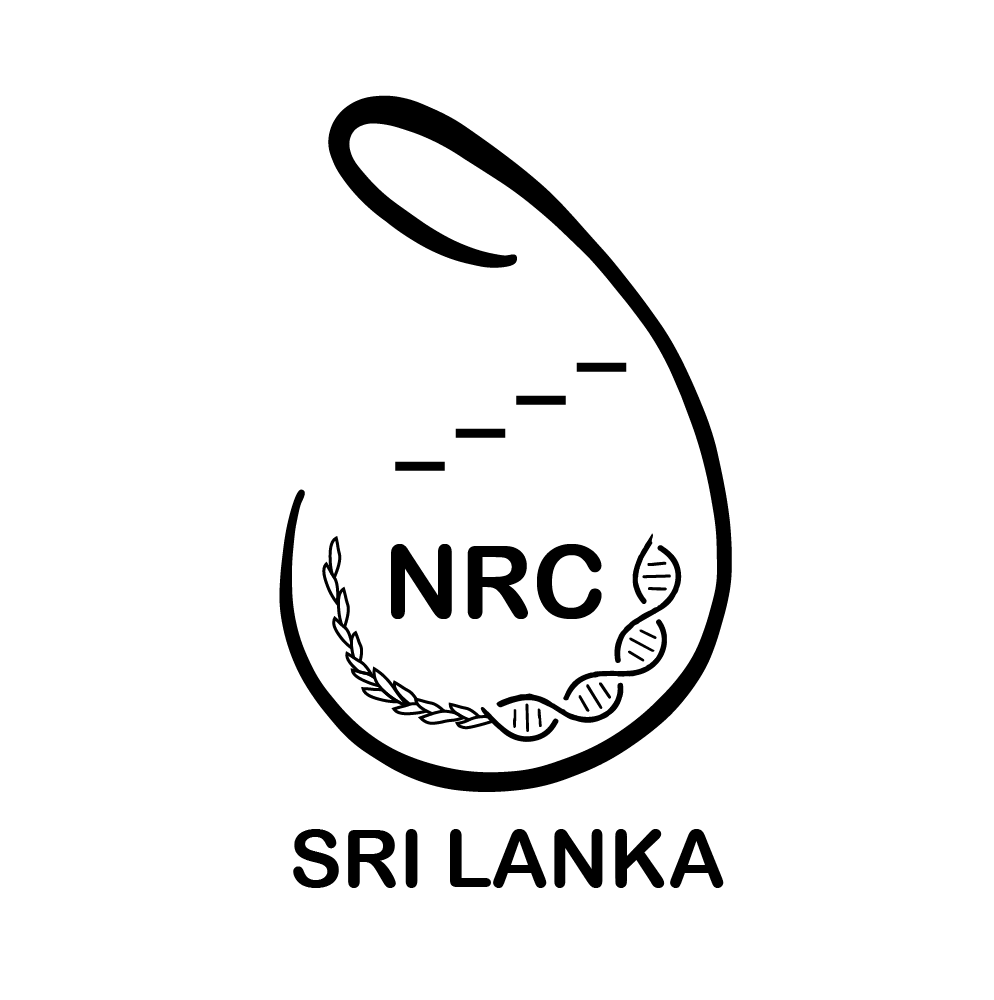
- Official Logo of NRC

Agency overview
- Formed: 20 April 1999; 27 years ago
- Type: Funding
- Jurisdiction: Sri Lanka
- Status: Parliament Act
- Headquarters: 120/07, Vidya Mawatha, Colombo 07, Sri Lanka
- Employees: 18
- Annual budget: Rs 80 Million (2023)
- Agency executive: Hemantha Dodampahala, Chairman
- Website: www.nrc.gov.lk

The National Research Council of Sri Lanka (NRC) is a funding agency in Sri Lanka, providing financial assistance to public sector scientists. It was established as a statutory body through an act of parliament in 2016 by the Parliament of the Democratic Socialist Republic of Sri Lanka. The NRC aims to foster and facilitate research in the fields of science and technology. The objective of the NRC is to build a strong and dynamic scientific and technological community in Sri Lanka and to support research initiatives in higher education institutions, public sector research institutes, and other government institutes to address national needs. The NRC also seeks to engage the private sector in enhancing research efforts in science and technology.

The National Research Council of Sri Lanka is an institute under the Ministry of Technology.

== History ==
The National Research Council of Sri Lanka (NRC) was established by President Chandrika Kumaratunga on April 20, 1999, with Aries Kovoor appointed as the founding chairman. In July 2007, President Mahinda Rajapaksa formalized the NRC's establishment as a Special Agency through a warrant issued under Article 33 of the Constitution by exercising the powers vested in him, with Eric Karunanayake appointed as chairman. Since its inception, Janaka de Silva has represented the NRC and was appointed chairman by President Mahinda Rajapaksa through a presidential directive on September 9, 2013. Under Janaka de Silva's leadership, the NRC was established as a statutory body through an act of parliament in 2016.

== Leadership ==
The National Research Council is led by the chairman, who serves as the head of the institution and presides over the council's meetings and its overall management. As of February 2023, the Chairman of the National Research Council is Hemantha Dodampahala. Prior to his appointment, the council was chaired by Janaka de Silva, who held the position until January 2020.

== List of Council Members ==
The Board of Directors, commonly referred to as the "Council," comprises the following individuals: the chairman, ten Council Members, a representative from the Ministry, and a representative from the Treasury.

- Hemantha Dodampahala - Chairman (Since 2020 – Present)
- Veranja Karunaratne (Since 2016 – Present)
- Chandana Jayarathna (Since 2020 – Present)
- K. R. Ranjith Mahanama (Since 2023 – present)
- H. A. Dharmagunawardane (Since 2023 – present)
- Gotabhaya Ranasinghe (Since 2023 – present)
- Manjula Ranagalage (Since 2023 – present)
- Niranga Alahacoon (Since 2023 – present)
- A. S. Nishshanka (Since 2023 – present)
- P. M. Dharmathilake (Since 2021 – present)
- M. M. Nawfal (Since 2022 – present)

== Former Chairmen ==
- Aries Kovoor (1999 – 2005)
- E. H. Karunanayake (2005 – 2013)
- Janaka de Silva (2013–2019)

== Former CEOs ==
- Manisha Rajapakse (2018–2022)

== Grants ==
Target Oriented Multidisciplinary Research Grants (TO Grants)

The NRC recognizes the importance of a multidisciplinary approach in addressing complex problems and advancing the understanding of various fields. In 2013, the NRC, in alignment with the Ministry of Technology & Research, launched a program aimed at promoting such an approach by inviting pre-proposals from public scientific research and development organizations, universities, and other research groups. The Target-Oriented Multi-Disciplinary research grants focus on solving nationally relevant issues related to economic development, social welfare, and environmental sustainability. These projects aim to fill major knowledge gaps and address challenges faced by the nation, with a clear path for translating research outcomes into policy, strategy, product/process development, and uptake.

The NRC has identified ten thrust areas of research and has invited proposals from several priority areas associated with the National Research and Development Policy Report. The value of the grant provided to selected research projects is up to Rs. 50 million over a period of five years. Funding is highly competitive and the NRC will select the most appropriate and capable researchers with the ability to work as a team towards tangible outcomes.

Once the grant is provided, these multi-center projects will be regularly and rigorously monitored, evaluated, and scrutinized to ensure the achievement of stated outcomes. The operation aspects of the grant will be similar to the Investigator Driven Grant, with the appointment of a Principal Investigator and a Deputy Principal Investigator. The NRC is committed to investing a substantial sum of public money in these projects and is confident that the multidisciplinary approach will lead to innovative solutions and significant advancements in various fields.

Investigator Driven Research Grants (ID Grants)

The NRC is dedicated to supporting and fostering research and development (R&D) activities in the country. The majority of R&D activities are conducted by public institutes and universities, and are funded through various sources such as government institutional funds, competitive grants, and research contracts. To streamline the process for scientists to conduct research, the NRC established the Research Grants programme, which provides competitive grants to public institutes for R&D activities. This programme has been refined over time, with a focus on scientific excellence, relevance to national development, and the publication of findings in international journals.

The application process is rigorous and thorough, and the Council carefully evaluates each proposal before deciding on an appropriate allocation of funds. These funds are channeled directly to the Principal Investigator, who is responsible for project implementation, allowing for a high level of flexibility and freedom for the scientist. The Council and the NRC Secretariat monitor the progress of each grant, and the NRC has implemented new regulations and guidelines to ensure the best outcomes.

Over the years, the NRC has diversified the types of grants it provides, funding research in a wide range of areas, including pure science, food, water, environment, energy, national surveillance, irrigation systems, wildlife and ecotourism, speech translations, construction and architecture, railway traffic, sports, and more. The number of applications received by the NRC has increased over time, indicating a growing interest in R&D in Sri Lanka. The NRC will continue to support and encourage research in all areas, to maintain the momentum and success that it has achieved so far.

Public Private Partnership Programme (PPP Programme)

Advancements in Science and Technology (S&T) Research and Development (R&D) hold the potential to spur economic growth by creating value-added products and services that are competitive on the global stage. To realize this goal, it is essential to align R&D activities with the needs of key industries that drive economic growth in Sri Lanka. The Public R&D Private Industry Partnership (PPP) program aims to foster collaboration between various sectors to maximize the impact of R&D efforts and contribute to the country's economic development.

Through this program, the National Research Council (NRC) will act as a facilitator, connecting the government, local institutes, universities, R&D institutes, corporate sector, SME sector, and other key players to address industry R&D needs and provide research-based solutions. The program aims to encourage meaningful partnerships that allow for sharing of research expertise, facilities, and services, as well as reducing the time and cost of R&D activities.

To further incentivize private sector participation in R&D, the government offers tax concessions in relation to R&D expenditure by enterprises in partnership with the public sector. This program aims to support all innovative research, including new or improved products, processes, services, value addition, and technical solutions with commercial potential. The PPP program is an initiative that seeks to leverage the collective strengths of different sectors to advance R&D and spur economic development in Sri Lanka.

== President’s Award for Scientific Research (PASR) ==
The National Research Council is empowered to develop and implement a recognition and award system for outstanding research and innovation in the fields of science and technology. To maintain the prestigious nature of these awards, the NRC is required to regularly review and update the selection criteria.

Awards will be granted to published works, rather than individual scientists. All Sri Lankan co-authors affiliated with a Sri Lankan institution will be recognized as award recipients. The journal ranking system used to determine the best published scientific work will be source-normalized and based on weighted citations to eliminate any biases towards particular scientific disciplines. This information will be made publicly available. To emphasize the importance of research conceptualized and performed primarily in Sri Lanka, recognition will be given to research that has a significant contribution from Sri Lankan scientists working in the country.

In addition to awards for published works, awards will also be given for patents based on innovations in science.

Awards will be presented two years after the year of publication or patent granting to allow for adequate time for indexing, documentation, and any necessary retractions. Each year, the top 100 papers published in journals with the highest SCImago Journal Ranking (SJR) in which 20% or more of the authors are Sri Lankan scientists affiliated with a Sri Lankan institution, or each international patent based on an innovation in science awarded to a Sri Lankan scientist affiliated with a Sri Lankan institution, will receive an award.

== See also ==
- Janaka de Silva
- National Science Foundation of Sri Lanka
- Ministry of Science, Technology and Research
