= E. M. Wijerama =

E.M. Wijerama, FRCP was a Sri Lankan physician and philanthropist. He was the first President of the Ceylon College of Physicians and former President of the Ceylon Medical Association.

Educated at Royal College Colombo, he studied medicine at the Colombo Medical College and went on to become a Fellow of the Royal College of Physicians after gaining its membership. A leading consultant physician of the General Hospital, Colombo, he was elected as President of the Ceylon Medical Association from 1947 to 1948. In 1967 was elected the first President of Ceylon College of Physicians.

He donated his home in Colombo to the Ceylon Medical Association in 1964. Renamed Wijerama House, it is the current headquarters of the Sri Lanka Medical Association (SLMA), the most influential professional body in the country and is home to the Sri Lanka Medical Library, one of the principal medical libraries in the island. The adjoining road which was formally known as MacCarthy Road was renamed in his honour as Dr E.M. Wijerama Mawatha by the Colombo Municipal Council during his lifetime, the first time a street was named after a living person in Sri Lanka.
