= Harendra de Silva =

Sri Lankan pediatrician

- Education: University of Colombo; Ananda College Colombo
- Occupations: Professor and Head of the Department of Pediatrics at the University of Kelaniya, in Sri Lanka.
- Employer: University of Colombo
- Known for: Founder chairman of Sri Lanka’s National Child Protection Authority, Activist and legislator in Child Protection
- Title: Professor

Harendra de Silva is a pediatrician whose efforts have helped to create awareness of child abuse in Sri Lanka.

== Education ==
Harendra de Silva was educated at Ananda College Colombo, before he entered the Faculty of Medicine, University of Colombo, where he obtained both an undergraduate Bachelor of Medicine, Bachelor of Surgery and later Doctor of Medicine.

== Career ==
He was appointed to the Department of Paediatrics in Galle. He was the senior lecturer and subsequently became head of the department. De Silva became a professor of Paediatrics, moving to the University of Kelaniya in 1999.

He was the first Chairman of the National Child Protection Authority (NCPA) and chaired the Presidential Task Force on Child Protection with Dr. Tara de Mel, appointed by President Chandrika Kumaratunga, which resulted in the establishment of the NCPA in 1998.

== Honours ==
Dr. de Silva was awarded the 'Most Outstanding Asian Pediatrician Award' from the Asian Pediatrics Association and the Career Award from the International Society against Child Abuse and Neglect (USA). He was shortlisted for the 2011 British Medical Journal Group Lifetime Achievement Award.
