= Kemal Deen =

- Education: Trinity College, Kandy; University of Peradeniya; University of Birmingham; University of Minnesota
- Occupation: Professor of Surgery
- Employer: University of Kelaniya
- Title: Professor

Professor Kemal Deen is a Sri Lankan academic surgeon, and a consultant in GastroIntestinal Surgery. He is the Senior Professor of Surgery at the University of Kelaniya Medical School, Sri Lanka. He is a founder professor of the Department of Surgery and previously, he held the position of the head of Department of Surgery from 1998 to 2003. His academic degrees are MBBS (Peradeniya); MD (Birmingham); MS (Colombo); FRCS (Glasgow). In 2014, he was elected as the president elect for The College of Surgeons of Sri Lanka.

== Education ==
Deen was educated at Trinity College, Kandy, where he won sport colours in athletics and the Trinity Lion in rugby scoring the winning try in the Bradby Shield Encounter against Royal in 1976. He subsequently entered the University of Peradeniya in 1977 from where he obtained a Bachelor of Medicine and Bachelor of Surgery degree. He later obtained a postgraduate Doctor of Medicine from the University of Birmingham in 1993 and the Fellowship of the Royal College of Surgeons. He also trained in the USA as a Fellow at Mayo Clinic and the University of Minnesota Medical School.

== Educational and Professional work ==
Deen was appointed Professor of Surgery in the University of Kelaniya and together with Janaka de Silva, was a part of the concept-planning team which brought liver transplantation to Sri Lanka. He has published several books and research papers in peer reviewed journals.

== Honours ==
Deen is a Fellow of the Royal College of Surgeons London, a Member of American Society of Colon and Rectal Surgery, a Fellow of the National Academy of Science –Sri Lanka, a Fellow of the Association of Colon and Rectal Surgeons –India, a Fellow of the Pakistan Society of Clinical Oncology – Pakistan. Deen holds visiting professorships at The Tata Memorial Cancer Centre- Mumbai, India, The Islamic International Medical university, The Christian Medical College, Vellore, India and The International Medical University, Seremban, Malaysia.

== See also ==
- List of University of Birmingham people
