= Charitha Herath =

Sri Lankan politician

Hon. Charitha Herath
- චරිත හේරත් சறித ஹேரத்
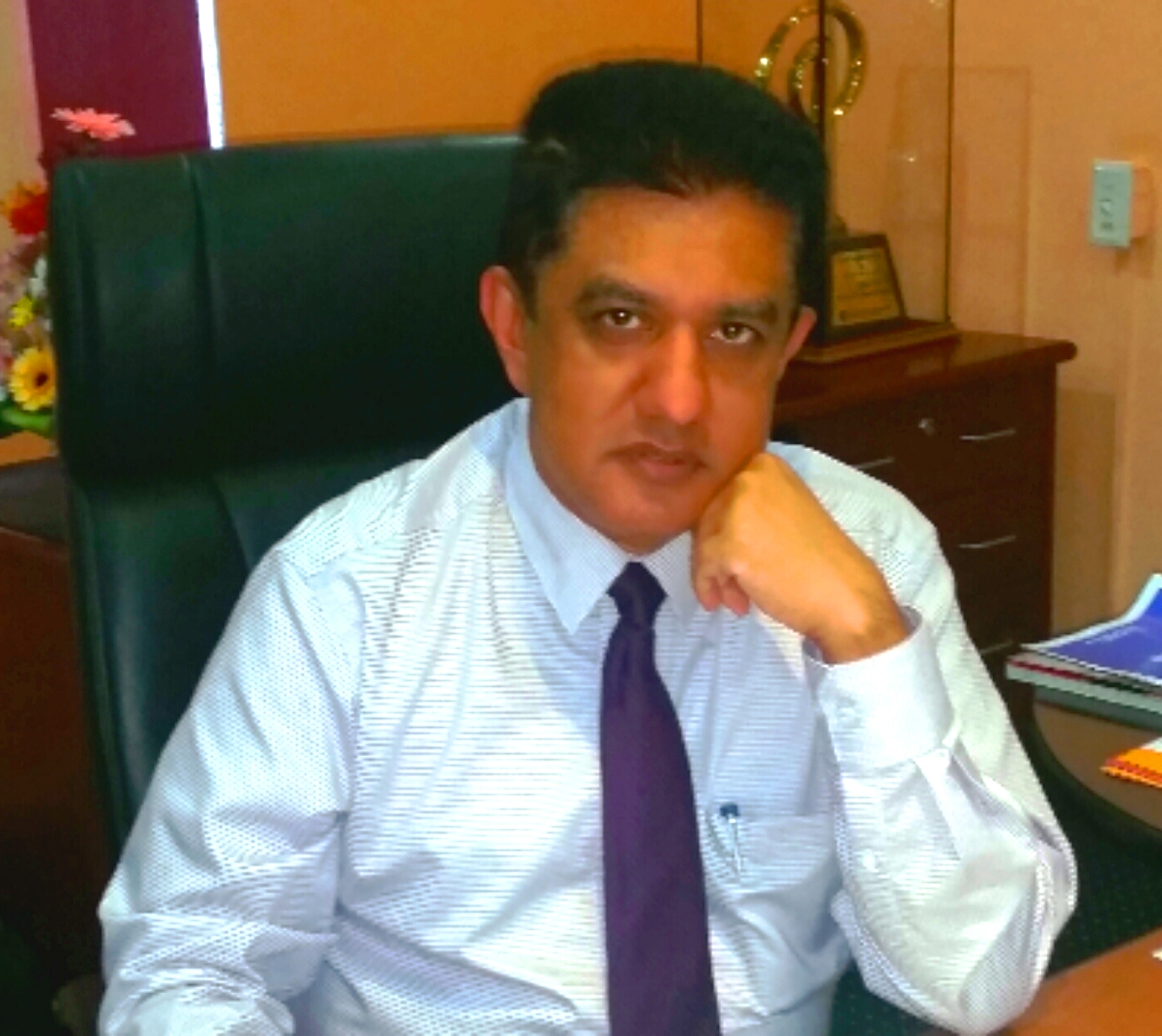
- Ex Member of Parliament from National List
- In office 2020–2024

Personal details
- Born: 9 September 1967 (age 59)
- Party: Freedom People's Congress (since 2022)
- Other political affiliations: Sri Lanka Freedom Party (before 2018); Sri Lanka Podujana Peramuna (2018–2022)
- Education: University of Peradeniya; Ohio University; Sichuan University; University of Kelaniya
- Profession: Academic
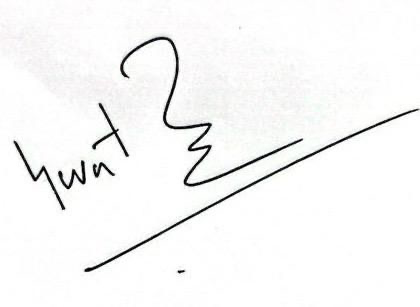
- Signature
- Website: www.charithaherath.com

Herath Mudiyanselage Charitha Herath (born 9 September 1967) was member of Parliament from National List, Ex Chairman of the Committee on Public Enterprises (COPE). and the Professor of Philosophy at the University of Peradeniya. His appointment was valid from 21 June 2019. Chair Professorship of Philosophy at Peradeniya has been one of the well established academic position. He is the former Permanent secretary of the Ministry of Mass Media and Information in Sri Lanka and former chairman of the Central Environment Authority. Herath's academic interests are mainly based on Contemporary Analytical Philosophy and his research focused on Later Wittgenstein's Philosophy and the Environmental Ethics. He was the Head of the Department of Philosophy at the University of Peradeniya from 2016 to 2018.

== Professional career ==
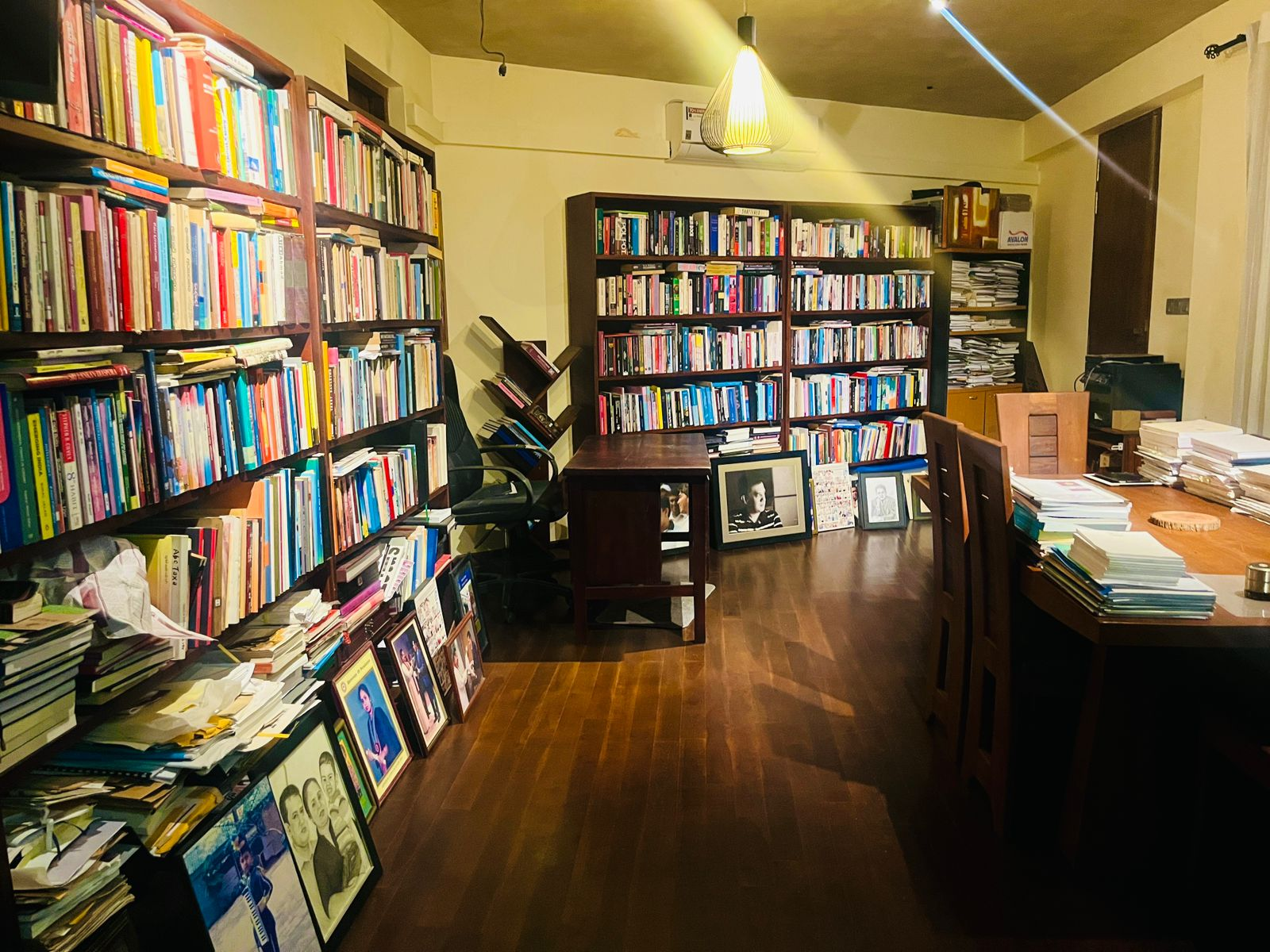
Private Library of Professor Charitha Herath

Charitha Herath was heading some of the important public institutions in the country. He was appointed as the permanent secretary to the Ministry of Media, Information and Digital Infrastructures in two occasions, (2012–2015) and (2017). Prior to that position, he was appointed to the Central Environmental Authority, which is the principal environmental regulatory agency, as the Chairman (2010–2013).

Herath holds a bachelor's degree in Philosophy with a minor in Psychology from the University of Peradeniya and a Post Graduate Degree in Social and Political Psychology from Ohio University, Athens, Ohio in USA. In 1998 he completed a Master's Diploma at the Sichuan Union University, in Chengdu, China. He has completed his Doctoral Degree in Environmental Philosophy at the University of Kelaniya. The topic of his Doctoral thesis was A Philosophical Analysis on the Concept of Conservation in the field of Environmental Ethics- The Case of Environmental Impact Assessments in Sri Lanka. Herath was appointed as the chairman of the Central Environment Authority in May 2010 and served until 12 July 2012. He served as the Permanent Secretary to the Ministry of Mass Media and Information from 2013 to 2015 and 2018.

== Publications ==
- Nuthana Kumaraya
- Vibhawa Thanha

== See also ==
- List of Sri Lankan non-career Permanent Secretaries
