= Priyani Soysa =

Sri Lankan scientist (1925–2023)

Deshamanya Priyani Elizabeth Soysa (Sinhala: ප්‍රියානි සොයිසා; 23 November 1925 – 7 April 2023) was a Sri Lankan scientist who was Emeritus Professor of Paediatrics of the University of Colombo and the first woman to be appointed to a professorial chair in Sri Lanka.

== Early life and education ==
Soysa was born on 23 November 1925. After completing her studies in Princess of Wales College, Moratuwa, she entered the Faculty of Medicine, University of Colombo where she graduated with First Class Honours in the final MBBS exam. Thereafter, she proceeded to the United Kingdom to pursue her specialist studies in Paediatrics. After obtaining the Membership of the Royal College of Physicians, London she also sat for the Doctorate in Medicine of the University of Ceylon, becoming the first woman to obtain the qualification.

== Career ==
Having functioned as a paediatrician in various parts of the country including Jaffna, she became the first woman in Sri Lanka to be appointed to a professorial chair, when she succeeded her mentor, Professor C. C. de Silva, as Professor of Paediatrics in the Faculty of Medicine, University of Ceylon and subsequently the University of Colombo. She held the chair in Paediatrics for 25 years before retiring in 1991. Widely known for her pioneering research in Nutrition and Infectious Diseases, she was also instrumental in imposing regulations restricting advertising of infant formula milk, and formulating the national policy on breast feeding, which recommended Exclusive Breast Feeding for 4–6 months.

Among the many public sector posts she held during her distinguished career are Chairperson of the Board of Study in Paediatrics of the Post Graduate Institute of Medicine and Chairperson, National Science Foundation of Sri Lanka. She also served as a consultant to the World Health Organization and the United Nations Subcommittee on Nutrition.

Soysa was President of the Sri Lanka Paediatric Association (now known as the Sri Lanka College of Paediatricians), the Sri Lanka Medical Association and the Sri Lanka Association for the Advancement of Science.

== Allegation of negligence ==
In a landmark case of Medical Negligence, she was made the defendant in a lawsuit filed by a prominent lawyer, Rienzie Arseculeratne, who alleged that Prof. Soysa was negligent in the care of his three-year-old daughter, who turned out to have a Brain Stem Glioma. After a protracted and lengthy litigation, that traversed the full breadth of the legal process in Sri Lanka, the Supreme Court ruled in her favour, holding that she was not negligent, and causation was not established by the plaintiff.

== Death ==
Soyza died on 7 April 2023, at the age of 97.

== See also ==
Arseculeratne Vs Priyani Soysa

== Sources ==
- Senanayake MP. Paediatrics and child care in Sri Lanka: The past unfolded. Vijitha Yapa Publishers, May 2007.
