= J. B. Peiris =

Sri Lankan neurologist

JB Peiris
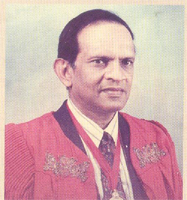
- Born: Sri Lanka
- Education: University of Colombo; Royal College Colombo Institute of Neurology, Queens Square, London
- Occupation: Consultant neurologist
- Employer: Ministry of Health Sri Lanka
- Title: Deshamanya; Vidya Jyothi Dr

J.B. Peiris is a Sri Lankan neurologist who was the founder of the Institute of Neurology, Chairman of the Sri Jayewardenapura Hospital and has been an executive Director of the Postgraduate Institute of Medicine.

== Education and training ==
Educated at Royal College Colombo, he studied medicine at Colombo Medical College and gained his MD from the University of Colombo and a Membership of the Royal College of Physicians (MRCP). He trained at the Institute of Neurology, Queen Square, as a Nuffield Research Fellow in London, working with Lord Roger Bannister and Dr Ross Russell.

== Contributions to the field of neurology ==
Peiris was appointed consultant neurologist at National Hospital Sri Lanka at the age of 33 and served as the country's sole neurologist for 10 years. During that period he pioneered the expansion of the subject of neurology in Sri Lanka and the establishment of the Institute of Neurology at National Hospital of Sri Lanka (NHSL), constructed entirely from public donations.

The Neurology Unit in the 1970s had beds scattered in four different medical wards in the National Hospital and Peiris had to share the male ward with a physician, the female ward with the cardiologist, dermatologist and three other physicians. The result was that there was cadre provision for one neurologist, with no possibility for the expansion. Peiris refurbished and equipped the former staff tea room into the first neurology intensive care unit.

As Sri Lanka's only neurologist, Peiris established Sri Lanka's first Institute of Neurology at NHSL, within three years. In 1984, a four-floor institute dedicated to this specialty was opened, with an intensive care unit, a medical and paediatric ward, a surgical ward, an operating theatre, a private wing, physiotherapy, lecture halls, and pharmacy. Worldwide only a few neurology institutes exist with all these facilities under one roof. In the subsequent years many postgraduates opted for neurology as a specialty after the Institute of Neurology came into existence. There are now over 40 neurologists on the island, with subspecialties in Paediatrics and Neurophysiology. The institute provided the platform and the enabling environment for the growth of neurology as a specialty in Sri Lanka.

Peiris was responsible for many of the donations for the construction of the Institute of Neurology and also collaborated with the technical committee headed by Navin Gooneratne of Design Consortium and Mohan Coomaraswamy of Project Management services on a weekly basis for three years. The public funds collected for the construction was managed and distributed by the All Ceylon Buddhist Congress (ACBC), with the donation for the ground floor coming from Mrs Milina Sumathipala. The hospital welfare service, which is a branch of the ACBC (at the time headed by Ven Vipassi Thero) played a supportive role. The Institute of Neurology was ceremonially opened on 8 April 1984 with the then Prime Minister, the Hon. Ranasinghe Premadasa, as the chief guest.

As a researcher Peiris's contribution to neurology had a global impact. He has written research papers describing four new clinical entities. He also pioneered three new treatment modalities which have been adopted worldwide. The original descriptions were on Non familial juvenile distal spinal muscular atrophy of upper extremity, a delayed onset Cerebellar syndrome complicating Falciparum Malaria, Transient Emboligenic Aortoarteritis – a noteworthy entity in strokes in the young as commented by the Editor of the Archives of Neurology, July 1978.

The treatment modalities he pioneered are: Clonazepam in the treatment of choreiform activity, modified form of Plama Exchange for Guillain Barre’ syndrome in developing countries and Sodium Valproate in Trigeminal Neuralgia.

== Contributions to other areas of medicine ==
He was the executive director of the Post Graduate Institute of Medicine (PGIM) from 1996 to 2002, during which time there were many improvements in the PGIM including the construction of the new building, establishment of new Boards of Study in Dermatology and Veneorology. The number qualifying annually as specialists annually was doubled by increasing the number of examinations. This has helped to have specialists in many parts of the country.

Peiris also served as Chairman of the Sri Jayawardenepura Hospital of Sri Lanka. During his tenure he commenced the Cardiology, ENT and Orthopaedics units while reopening the closed units of Cardiac Surgery and Paediatric Surgery.

== Other professional activities ==
He is a Senior Fellow of the Royal College of Physicians, the regional representative of the Royal College of Physicians of Edinburgh in Sri Lanka, Honorary Foreign Fellow of Association of British Neurologists, Senior Fellow of all three Royal Colleges of Great Britain and Honorary Fellow of the Royal Australasian College of Physicians.

He is the Patron of the Association of Sri Lankan Neurologists (ASN) and the National Stroke Association of Sri Lanka. He was past President of the Sri Lanka Medical Association in 1994 and Ceylon College of Physicians from 1987 to 1988., as well as past President of the Rotary Club of Colombo West and Sri Lanka – United Kingdom Society.

Peiris has been an invited guest lecturer in the Institute of Neurology, Queen Square, London, Johns Hopkins University, USA, University of California in Los Angeles (UCLA), and University of Chiba, Japan.

He has authored more than 30 publications, including the description of three new disease entities and three original articles of innovations in therapy. He has authored two books which are used as learning aids by the postgraduates studying for MD and MRCP (UK) examinations. MRCP – Neurology for PACES is authored by him with physician daughter, Dr Natasha Peiris, and was released in UK. Additionally he has published two CDs for undergraduates and postgraduates. He has written articles in to national newspapers.

Peiris, as Patron of ASN, is the Master of Ceremonies at Annual ASN events.

== Honours and titles ==
His contribution to the health services of the country was honored with the title "Deshamanya" and his contribution to neurosciences and teaching was rewarded with the honour of "Vidya Jyothi" and Viswa Prasadini, by the Government of Sri Lanka, a very rare combination of honours for a medic.

The Dr J B Peiris Oration is organised annually by Association of Sri Lankan Neurologists (ASN), in recognition of the services he has rendered. It was launched in 2009 in the presence of Peiris and his family. Speaking at the inaugural oration, Dr Ranjani Gamage, Consultant Neurologist at NHSL, summoned up Peiris's lifetime of contributions to humanity stating that "What we have done for ourselves alone, dies with us, what we have done for others and the world remains and is immortal."
The oration is an annual feature in the calendar of ASN activities. Neurologist colleagues, who trained under his supervision, annually pay tribute to him through this oration.

== Family life ==
Peiris is married to Dr Rose, a doctor and champion bridge player. They have a daughter, Natasha, who is a Consultant Physician, and son, Shanaka Jayanath, a Senior Economist with the International monetary Fund in Washington, D.C. (and now the IMF Resident Representative in Manila). He has two grandsons, Jivantha Fernando and Skyler Peiris. He also has one granddaughter named Sarai peiris.
