= Sunitha Wickramasinghe =

Sri Lankan born British haematologist

Deputy Dean of the Imperial College School of Medicine

Personal details
- Born: 1941/42
- Died: 2009
- Education: University of Ceylon; Royal College Colombo
- Profession: Academic, haematologist

Sunitha Wickramasinghe (1941/42-2009) was a Sri Lankan born British academic and haematologist. He was a professor of Haematology, he was the former Deputy Dean of the Imperial College School of Medicine and one of the world's leading authorities on congenital dyserythropoietic anaemias

Born to a family of scientists, his father was a Cambridge educated mathematician. Educated at the Royal College Colombo, he went on to study medicine at the Colombo Medical College, University of Ceylon graduating with an MBBS degree in 1964. Moving to the United Kingdom, he specialized in haematology and carried out research at the University of Cambridge where he was elected to a Gulbenkian Research Studentship. He gained his PhD in 1968 and was elected to the John Lucas Walker Senior (post-doctoral) Studentship in 1968 along with receiving a ScD in 1984. He was elected to Fellowships of the Royal College of Pathologists, the Institute of Biology and received Honorary Membership, later Fellowship of the Royal College of Physicians as well as being made an Honorary Fellow of the Sri Lanka College of Haematology.

Wickramasinghe carried out research at the University of Leeds, thereafter he joined the St Mary's Hospital Medical School in 1970, serving until his retirement in 2000. During this time he was appointed Professor of Haematology and was Deputy Dean at Imperial College School of Medicine at St Mary's. He introduced the BSc course in haematology at St Mary's.
