= Nimal Bopage =

Sri Lankan lawyer

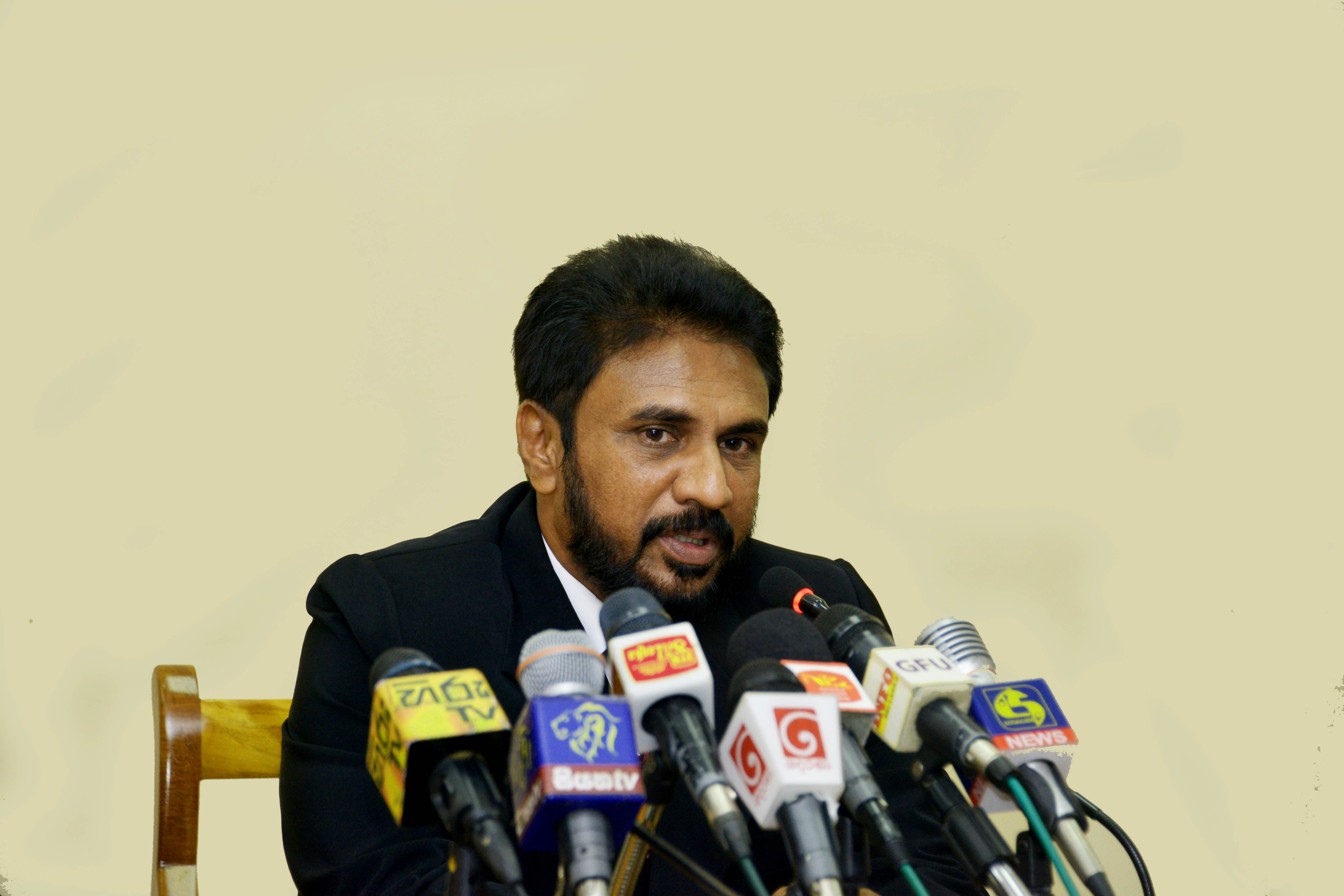

Adviser to the President
- Incumbent
- Assumed office 9 June 2017

Additional Secretary to the President
- Incumbent
- Assumed office 9 June 2017

Former Chairman of Geological Survey and Mines Bureau
- In office 13 June 2017 – 19 February 2018
- Preceded by: Keerthi Dissanayake
- Succeeded by: Asela Iddawela

Former Secretary to the Ministry of Parliamentary Reforms and Mass Media
- In office 25 April 2016 – 9 June 2017
- Preceded by: Vajira Narampanawa
- Succeeded by: R. H. S. Samaratunga

Former Chairman of the State Plantation Corporation

Former Chairman of the Vocational Training Authority of Sri Lanka

Former Chairman National Human Resources Development Council of Sri Lanka

Former Consultant to the Ministry of Transport

Personal details
- Born: Bopage Nimalweera; 17 May 1961 (age 64) Weligama, Matara District, Southern Province, Dominion of Ceylon (now Sri Lanka)
- Spouse: Swarna Hewavitharane
- Children: Arunlu; Himidiri
- Occupation: Civil Servant
- Profession: Lawyer
- Website: Official website

Bopage Nimalweera (Sinhalese: බෝපගේ නිමල්වීර), more commonly known as Nimal Bopage (Sinhalese: නිමල් බෝපගේ, Tamil: நிமல் போபகே) is a Sri Lankan lawyer, charted accountant, auditor, civil servant, diplomat, academic and lyricist. Currently he is the additional secretary to the president of Sri Lanka and adviser to the president of Sri Lanka and the chairman of the Geological Survey and Mines Bureau and former secretary to the Ministry of Parliamentary Reforms and Mass Media in Sri Lanka and former chairman of the State Plantation Corporation of Sri Lanka.

Nimal Bopage holds a bachelor's degree in law (LLB) from the University of Colombo and attorney at law from Sri Lanka Law College. He is a fellow member of the Institute of Chartered Accountants of Sri Lanka, Master of Laws (LLM) and Master of Business Administration from Open University of Sri Lanka. He was the secretary to the Independent Students' Association of Colombo University.

He started his career as a lecturer in commercial law and industrial law in several government universities and private institutions. Later as a Civil Servant (SLAS officer) he served as AGA in several AGA Divisions including Kelaniya, Elahera, Tangalle and served as a senior assistant secretary to the Ministry of Home Affairs and Provincial Council and senior assistant secretary to the Ministry of Ethnic Affairs and National Integration until he resigned due to political interference. He served as permanent secretary of The Ministry of Parliamentary Reforms and Mass Media. Before his appointment as the secretary, He was the chairman of the National Apprentice and Industrial Training Authority, National Human Resources Development Authority, Sri Lanka Rupavahini Corporation, Sri Lanka Vocational Training Authority and Sri Lanka State Plantation Corporation.

== See also ==
- List of Sri Lankan non-career Permanent Secretaries
