= Nihal Jayawickrama =

Sri Lankan academic

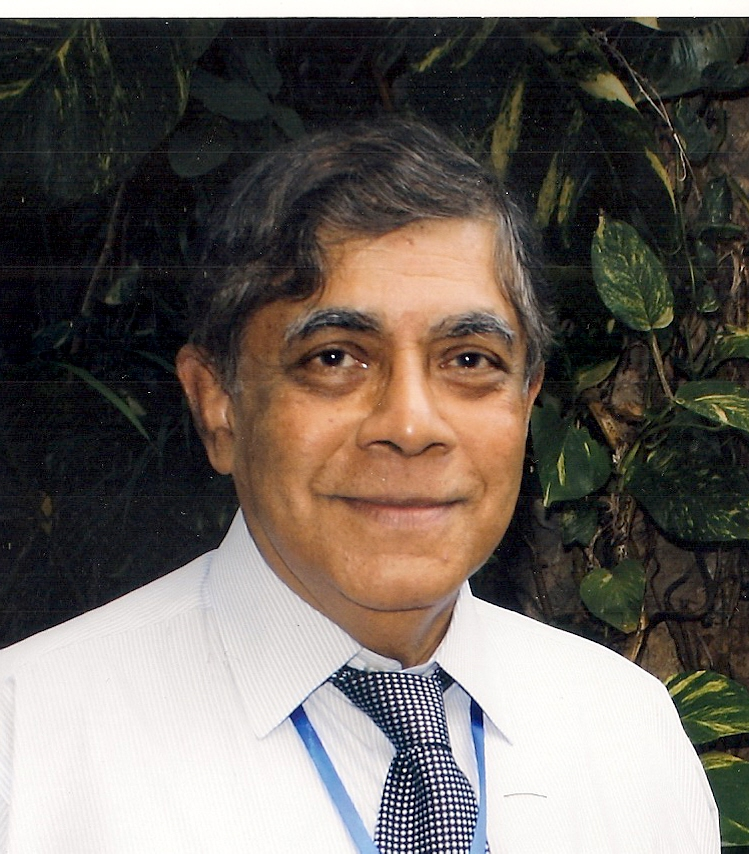

Nihal Mahendra Sudrikku Jayawickrama (born 1937) is a Sri Lankan academic. He was the former Permanent Secretary to the Ministry of Justice (1970–1977), Professor of Law at University of Hong Kong (1984–1997), Ariel F Sallows Professor of Human Rights at the University of Saskatchewan, Canada (1992–1993), and executive director of Transparency International (1997–2000). He is now an independent legal consultant, and has been the Coordinator of the UN-sponsored Judicial Integrity Group since 2000.

== Early life and education ==
Nihal Jayawickrama was born to a family of lawyers. His father, Alfred Sudrikku Jayawickrama, was a solicitor in the southern city of Galle, and belonged to a family that included several solicitors, advocates, queen's counsel, judges, and a minister of justice. His mother's elder brother, T.C.P.Fernando, was a district judge, while her younger brother, Justice T.S.Fernando QC was Solicitor General, Attorney General, Judge of the Supreme Court and President of the Court of Final Appeal.

Jayawickrama was educated at Richmond College, Galle and at the Royal College Colombo. Thereafter he entered the Law Faculty of the University of Ceylon, Peradeniya, from where he graduated in 1961. While in the university, he was actively involved in two student strikes: one over poor staff-student relations, and the other that sought acceptance of the principle of a fair and just inquiry before a student was punished.

He was called to the bar in 1962 after apprenticing in the chambers of A. H. C. de Silva, QC and C.Renganathan QC.

== Legal career ==
He commenced his practice under Dr Colvin R. de Silva, and also worked in the chambers of Vernon Wijetunge QC, R.A.Kannangara, and S.Ambalavanar. He practised in both original and appellate courts, and appeared in several cases of political significance at the time involving constitutional, administrative, election and human rights law. In 1968, he was elected to the Bar Council to represent the junior bar, and in 1969 was elected its honorary secretary. In his annual report for that year, he described the judicial system of Ceylon at the time as “an antique labyrinth with tortuous passages and cavities through which the potential litigant must grope, often blindfolded, in his search for justice”.

Jayawickrama was a founder member of the Ceylon Section of Amnesty International. Awarded a UNESCO Youth Leadership Grant in 1966, he studied the working of non-governmental organisations in western and eastern Europe, and was attached to the legal staff of the International Commission of Jurists, Geneva, then headed by secretary-general Sean MacBride. He was also the general secretary, and later president, of the UN Association of Ceylon, and vice-president of the World Federation of United Nations Associations, Geneva.

=== Government service ===
In 1970, at the age of 32, following the general election of that year, he was appointed Permanent Secretary to the Ministry of Justice in the Government of Sirimavo Bandaranaike. He held that office for the next seven years, except for a short period as Attorney General. During his tenure, extensive reforms were implemented in the court structure and to simplify civil, criminal and appellate procedures. A unified legal profession was established by the fusion of advocates and proctors (solicitors). Conciliation boards were established in every judicial district. He played a major role in the establishment of a Criminal Justice Commission for the trial of over 16,000 persons who were arrested, or had surrendered, in the wake of the 1971 JVP Insurrection, and was then responsible for overseeing their rehabilitation and return to society.

He was vice-chairman of the Sri Lanka Delegation to the United Nations General Assembly, a Member of the Permanent Court of Arbitration at The Hague, Member for Sri Lanka on the Asian-African Legal Consultative Committee, and vice-chairman of the Fifth UN Congress on the Prevention of Crime and the Treatment of Offenders. He was a member of the committee appointed to draft the 1972 Constitution of the Republic of Sri Lanka, a member of the Judicial Service Advisory Board appointed under that Constitution, and later served as legal adviser to the members of the Opposition in the Select Committee of the National State Assembly that drafted the 1978 Constitution.

Jayawickrama's tenure in the ministry of justice was not free of controversy. The decision that all legal work of state corporations should be handled by a new division in the Attorney-General's Department was met with strong opposition from lawyers of the ruling party to whom such work had previously been distributed. The radical procedural reforms were resisted by powerful sections of the legal profession and the judiciary. His proposal to regulate legal fees evoked a strong protest from senior lawyers, and the expansion of conciliation procedures from which lawyers were excluded led to the reduction of court cases by almost 50 per cent, another extremely unpopular measure among the legal profession. His attempts to ensure that judges applied the rules relating to time limits for oral submissions in the appellate courts led to an open confrontation between him and the chief justice and an extended “cold war” between the supreme court and the ministry of justice.

Following the change of government in 1977, Jayawickrama resigned his office and left for London where he was appointed a Research Fellow at King's College, University of London. In 1978, while on a visit to Sri Lanka, his passport was impounded and proceedings against him were commenced before the Special Presidential Commission of Inquiry appointed by the new government to investigate the alleged abuse and/or misuse of power by the previous government. Among the 45 charges laid against him were that he promoted the concept of "barefoot lawyers" ("thereby undermining the legal profession"), instituted an annual public dialogue between the executive and the judiciary in the form of a "judges' conference" ("thereby undermining the independence of the judiciary"), and refused to authorise solitary confinement for remand prisoners when requested to do so by the CID ("thereby interfering with criminal investigations"). After a seven-month inquiry at which he was defended by S.Nadesan, QC with J.C.T. Kotelawela and Faiz Mustapha, he was found guilty on most charges, and in 1980 after a two-day debate, Parliament imposed "civic disabilities" on him. Accordingly, he was prohibited from seeking election to parliament, holding public office or making political speeches for seven years. In the same year, after two other short inquiries, civic disabilities were similarly imposed on the Leader of the Opposition, Sirimavo Bandaranaike, and the leading opposition politician, Felix R. Dias Bandaranaike. In 1986, all three received unsolicited free pardons from the president.

== Academic career ==
During his academic life, Jayawickrama researched the international law of human rights under Professor James Fawcett, President of the European Commission of Human Rights. His research was incorporated in Paul Sieghart's pioneering work, The International Law of Human Rights, published by Oxford University Press in 1983. In the same year, he was awarded the degree of Doctor of Philosophy by the University of London (School of Oriental and African Studies) for his research on the application of international human rights law.

In 1985, after a short spell as associate director of the Marga Institute in Colombo, Dr Jayawickrama joined the Faculty of Law of the University of Hong Kong, where he served as a professor of Law until 1997. He taught constitutional and administrative law, and introduced a course on human rights law. He chaired the Hong Kong Section of the International Commission of Jurists and was the principal commentator on constitutional, judicial and human rights issues in that territory in the period preceding the transfer of sovereignty. He was intimately involved in the processes that led to the drafting and enactment of the Hong Kong Bill of Rights and the establishment of Hong Kong's Court of Final Appeal. In 1989, he accompanied Beijing student leader Li Lu to brief the UN Human Rights Sub-Commission on the “Tiananmen Massacre” and, with other colleagues and non-governmental organisations, was successful in securing the adoption of a resolution that “expressed concern at recent events in China” and requested the secretary-general to submit a comprehensive report on the events that had occurred in Tiananmen Square. He regularly contributed a weekly column on current affairs to the Hong Kong Standard.

In 1992–93, he occupied, on invitation, the Ariel F Sallows Chair of Human Rights at University of Saskatchewan, Canada, an award made for "distinguished contribution to research in or practice of human rights".

In 1996, Dr Jayawickrama, whose contract was due to end on 30 June 1997, was invited by the vice-chancellor, Professor Wang Gungwu, to apply for an extension under a scheme that was designed to encourage expatriate academics to remain in Hong Kong after the transfer of sovereignty to China. However, in 1997 he was informed by the new vice-chancellor that his contract would not be renewed. A commentator describes the event thus:

“Nihal Jayawickrama, an expert in constitutional law at the University of Hong Kong who taught a popular course in international human rights, was invited by the university to apply for an extension of his contract after it expired, coincidentally, on 30 June 1997. Then, following a series of trenchant newspaper articles in which he questioned the legality of the provisional legislature and moves to repeal sections of the Bill of Rights, he was told he no longer met the minimum criteria for reappointment. Students who expressed dismay were called in for ‘briefings’ by university administrators. One of the first acts of the vice-chancellor of the university, Professor Cheng Yiu-chung, appointed in early 1997, was to order democracy slogans, originally painted by students following the 1989 Tiananmen massacre, and regularly repainted since, to be obliterated."

== Later work ==
In October 1997, following his controversial and much publicised departure from the University of Hong Kong, Dr Jayawickrama was appointed executive director of Transparency International in Berlin. In 2000 he moved to the United Nations Centre for International Crime Prevention in London and worked as a Co-ordinator of the UN sponsored Judicial Integrity Group. He served as general counsel, and coordinated a programme on strengthening integrity systems in seven countries in Asia, Africa, Eastern Europe and Latin America.

Since 2000 he has been an independent consultant on governance, judicial reform and anti-corruption strategies. His work, under UN or EU auspices, has involved collaboration with several governments, legislatures and judiciaries, including those of Libya, China, the Russian Federation, Lebanon, Nigeria, Kenya, the Seychelles, Turkey, Afghanistan, Iraq, Sierra Leone, Indonesia, the Pacific Island States, the Philippines, Armenia and Egypt. He coordinated a pilot survey of court users and stakeholders in Sri Lanka to identify the nature and extent of corruption in the judicial system, and prepared a judicial ethics curriculum and manual and conducted training sessions for judges in Nigeria. He has served on expert groups that developed a UN Technical Guide on Strengthening Judicial Integrity and Capacity; a UN anti-corruption tool-kit; a UN Technical Guide to Promote the Implementation of the UN Convention Against Corruption; and an ICJ framework for preventing and eliminating corruption in judicial systems.

Nihal Jayawickrama is the Coordinator of the UN-sponsored Judicial Integrity Group which comprises 15 Chief Justices or Senior Justices representing the different legal systems of the world. The Group is mandated to formulate a concept of judicial accountability consistent with the principle of judicial accountability. Among its achievements so far are the Bangalore Principles of Judicial Conduct (which was approved by the UN Commission on Human Rights in 2003 and endorsed by ECOSOC in 2007), the Commentary on the Bangalore Principles, and the Implementation Measures. He was the Rapporteur of the Round-Table Meeting of Chief Justices convened at the Peace Palace at The Hague that adopted the Bangalore Principles in 2002.

Dr. Jayawickrama also works with the United Nations as a member of the advisory board of the Global Judicial Integrity Network at the United Nations Office on Drugs and Crime.

He is a member of the Legal Advisory Board of the US-based Genetics Policy Institute, and was the Chair of the Trustees of the Commonwealth Human Rights Initiative, London. He presented the keynote paper on the impact of corruption on human rights at the 2006 UN Conference on Good Governance and Human Rights in Warsaw, and was a member of the advisory group on the project on Corruption and Human Rights of the International Council on Human Rights Policy, Geneva.

Dr Jayawickrama is the author of The Judicial Application of Human Rights Law: National, Regional and International Jurisprudence (Cambridge University Press, 2002). [2] He is also the author of the Human Rights Law and Constitutional Law Titles in Halsbury's Laws of Hong Kong (Butterworths, 1981). He has published widely in refereed books and journals, and made presentations in over 40 countries on a range of issues relating to human rights, constitutional law, judicial integrity and governance. In 1997, he was invited to give evidence before the Standing Committee on Foreign Affairs, Defence and Trade of the Australian Parliament on matters relating to the transfer of Sovereignty over Hong Kong, and in 2004 he gave expert evidence on the impact of judicial corruption on the reciprocal enforcement of foreign judgments before the Superior Court of Justice of Ontario, Canada.

== Family ==
He married Sarojini Amarasuriya, the daughter of Senator Thomas Amarasuriya, President of the Senate, in 1965. Sarojini is the author of 'Writing that Conquers – Re-reading Robert Knox, 'An Historical Relation of the Island Ceylon' (Colombo, Social Scientists Association, 2004). They have two daughters. Their elder daughter, Nishana Jayawickrama, who is married to Antony Jackson, is Adviser and Head, Asia and Europe, in the Political Affairs Division of the Commonwealth Secretariat, London. Their younger daughter, Sharanya Jayawickrama, who was married to Barry Crosbie, was an assistant professor at Hong Kong Shue Yan University until her death in September, 2019.

== See also ==
- List of Sri Lankan non-career Permanent Secretaries
