= Allan Perry =

Sir Allan Perry
- Born: 17 April 1860; Luton, Kent, England
- Died: 17 December 1929 (aged 69); Effingham, Surrey, England
- Education: Durham University
- Known for: Surgeon Major; Principal Medical Officer; Inspector-General of Hospitals in Ceylon
- Parent(s): Isaac Perry and Betsy Kains (née Bond)
- Awards: Knight Bachelor (1904)
- Scientific career
- Fields: Medicine, Public Health
- Workplaces: Royal Army Medical Corps; Ceylon Medical College

Sir Allan Perry (17 April 1860 – 17 December 1929) was a British physician who was surgeon major, principal civil medical officer, and inspector general of hospitals in Ceylon.

Perry was born in Luton, Kent, on 17 April 1860 the youngest son of Isaac and Betsy Kains née Bond. He earned his Doctor of Medicine at Durham University, a Doctor of Public Health, a Membership of the Royal Colleges of Surgeons and a Licence of the Society of Apothecaries. Perry served in the Royal Army Medical Corps, retiring with the rank of Surgeon Major. In 1897 he was appointed as Principal Medical Officer, Inspector-General of Hospitals and Principal of the Ceylon Medical College. He died in Effingham, aged 69. He was knighted in London in 1904. He retired in 1912. He re-activated into the Royal Army Medical Corps in World War I and was later commissioned as a Lieutenant Colonel, running the Harvard Unit at General Hospital No.22 in Camiers, France, before serving at the Auxiliary Hospital for Officers at Fowey, Cornwall.

He died at Effingham, Surrey on 17 December 1929, at the age of 69.
