= Sanath Lamabathusooriya =

Sanath P Lamabadusuriya

Dean of the Faculty of Medicine, University of Colombo

Personal details
- Education: University of Ceylon; Royal College Colombo
- Profession: Academic, paediatrician

Sanath P Lamabadusuriya is a Sri Lankan academic and paediatrician. An Emeritus Professor of Paediatrics, he was the former Dean of the Faculty of Medicine, University of Colombo and one of the foremost paediatricians in Sri Lanka.

Educated at the Royal College, Colombo, he went on to study medicine at the Colombo Medical College, University of Ceylon graduating with an MBBS degree. Later he received a Colombo Plan scholarship to go to UK to do my MRCP and DCH. He worked for NHS at neonatal paediatrics unit at the Whittington Hospital in North London.Hebecame the first Sri Lankan clinician to receive a PhD. Specializing in paediatrics he spent many years at the Lady Ridgeway Hospital for Children. Later in the late 70s he became a lecturer and professor of paediatrics at the University of Ruhuna. During this time he played a major role in the Sri Lanka Cleft Palate Project in collaboration with the Great Ormond Street Hospital for Children. The Co-Director of the project was Dr. Michael Mars, Consultant Orthodontist, at the Hospital for Sick Children, Great Ormond Street, London. In addition to the service rendered to the patients, it also had the world‟s largest database on unoperated cleft lip and palate with more than 1000 patients. It was so successful that the BBC even made a film about the project called “When to Mend Faces”. The film was televised in 1992 in a programme titled QED and won an award.He was directly responsible for starting a diploma course to train speech therapists, and as a direct result, Sri Lanka now have nearly 60 speech therapists.

In 1991 he was appointed as chair and Head of Department of Paediatrics of the Faculty of Medicine, University of Colombo and served as the Dean of the faculty in 2002-2005 whilst concurrently serving as head of the department retiring in 2008. He was elected President of the Asian Pacific Paediatric Association.

For his work in the Sri Lanka Cleft Palate Project he was made a Member of the Order of the British Empire (MBE) by Queen Elizabeth and on his retirement his portrait was unveiled at the Lady Ridgeway Children's Hospital.
