= Ceylon College of Physicians =

Sri Lankan medical professional organization

The Ceylon College of Physicians (CCP) is a professional organisation for specialists in medicine in Sri Lanka. It is a non-profit organisation, and members contribute towards its activities voluntarily. Its specialities currently include cardiology, endocrinology, gastroenterology, nephrology, neurology, pulmonology, rheumatology and rehabilitation medicine. The college currently consists of over 700 members.

== Mission statement ==
The CCP states that it is an academic body 'established for the purpose of enhancing the knowledge of Medicine, promoting postgraduate education in Medicine', and 'ensuring that the highest quality of medical care is delivered to the patients by educating future physicians of the country'.

== History ==
The CCP was founded in Ceylon in 1967 after an informal meeting of eleven physicians on 25 July in the Consultants' Lounge of the General Hospital Colombo. The inaugural meeting of the College was held on 26 September of that year. All those who attended the meeting, as well as those applying for membership within a month, qualified as founder members of the College.

Dr E. M. Wijerama gave the first lecture of the College on 19 February 1968, with the subject 'Physicians, ancient and modern'.

== Membership ==
=== Associate membership ===
Associate membership is available to postgraduate trainees following the MD programme at the Postgraduate Institute of Medicine (PGIM) of the University of Colombo.

=== Membership ===
Membership is open to specialists holding the MD degree of the PGIM, and are board-certified in Medicine or one of its specialities.

=== Fellowship ===
Prospective members can apply for fellowship, which is then reviewed by a fellowship committee appointed by the Council of the College. Fellowship is awarded to people who have been members (or associate members) of the College for at least 10 years, and are considered worthy of recognition for their distinguished service to the profession of medicine. Fellows are entitled to use the post-nominal letters FCCP.

== See also ==
- Royal College of Physicians
