= Janaka de Silva =

Sri Lankan physician and academic

- Born: Colombo, Sri Lanka
- Education: Royal College, Colombo; University of Colombo MBBS MD; University of Oxford DPhil
- Occupation: Physician
- Title: Vidya Jyothi
- Parent(s): P. T. De Silva, Kusuma de Silva (née Weerasekera)

Janaka de Silva FRCP FNASSL is a Sri Lankan physician and academic. He is Professor Emeritus of Medicine at the University of Kelaniya.

== Biography ==
Janaka de Silva was educated at Royal College, Colombo and holds degrees from the universities of Colombo and Oxford (Pembroke College). He had his higher specialist clinical training at the John Radcliffe Hospital.

De Silva was Professor and Chair of Medicine at the University of Kelaniya from 1996-2022. In 1997 he succeeded Carlo Fonseka as Dean of Medicine, a post he held for nine years. He was also a member of the University Grants Commission from 2008-2011, and Director of the Postgraduate Institute of Medicine (PGIM), University of Colombo from 2014-2020. Before becoming its Director he chaired a number of boards in the PGIM where he and colleagues established the first formal training programme for gastroenterologists in Sri Lanka. Together with Kemal Deen and a few others he pioneered setting up of the liver transplant service at the Colombo North Teaching Hospital.

De Silva’s most influential contributions to research stemmed from his abiding interest in health problems prevalent in Sri Lanka. He was Chairman of the National Research Council from 2013-2019. He has held several editorial appointments and served on committees in health and research organizations including the WHO, Wellcome Trust and the UK's National Institute for Health and Care Research (NIHR).

He was President of the Ceylon College of Physicians in 2004, twenty years after his father, P. T. de Silva. In addition to several awards and fellowships from academic and professional bodies, de Silva was conferred an honorary DSc by his university, and the national titular honour Vidya Jyothi - Sri Lanka's highest honor for science.
