= Faculty of Medicine, University of Colombo =

Medical school in Sri Lanka

- කොළඹ විශ්වවිද්‍යාලයීය වෛද්‍ය පිඨය
- Type: Public
- Established: 1870
- Affiliations: University of Colombo, Sri Lanka
- Chancellor: Ven. Muruththettuwe Ananda Thero
- Vice-Chancellor: Professor Indika Karunathilake
- Dean: Professor Pujitha Wickramasinghe
- Location: Colombo, Sri Lanka
- Campus: Urban
- Website: Official website

Established in 1870 as the Colombo Medical School, the Faculty of Medicine of the University of Colombo, is the second oldest medical school in South Asia. It is considered to be the top most medical faculty in the country which requires the highest entry qualification in GCE Advanced Level examination.

== History ==
In 1839, the Governor of Ceylon J. A. Stewart Mackenzie started sending Ceylonese students to Calcutta for medical studies to the oldest medical school in South Asia - The Bengal Medical College.

In the 1860s the Colonial Surgeon, Dr. James Loos was requested to report on the large depopulation of the Wanni. He recommended that medical facilities should be available throughout the island and to this end a medical school should be opened. The Colombo Medical School was thus opened in 1870 by the then Governor Sir Hercule Robinson. Dr James Loos was its first principal. Dr. E.L.Koch was the second principal in whose memory the Koch Memorial Clock Tower, which still stands, was built in 1881.

The beginnings of the medical school were modest. It was situated in the General Hospital Colombo, and had three teachers and 25 students. It offered a course of three years duration until in 1873 the course was extended to four years. Its progress was rapid. In 1880 the medical school was raised to the status of a college (renamed Ceylon Medical College) and in 1884 the course was extended to 5 years.

In 1875 Mudaliyar Samson Rajapakse gifted three and a half acres of land on which the present Faculty is located. Sir Charles Henry de Soysa, Mudaliyar Susew de Soysa, Muhandiram A.Simon Fernando Wijegooneratne and Mudaliyar Vimala Gunawardana donated the buildings. These buildings are no more and the Anatomy block, built in 1913, is the oldest building now. In 1887, the Diploma of Licentiate of Medicine and Surgery (LMS) granted by the College became registrable with the General Medical Council (GMC) of the United Kingdom.

The Ceylon Medical College and the Ceylon University College, which had been established in 1921, formed the nucleus of the University of Ceylon, which came into being in 1942. The status of the Ceylon Medical College was elevated to the Faculty of Medicine of the University of Ceylon and the diploma of L.M.S. was replaced by the degree of MBBS Until it became the Faculty of Medicine, the Medical College was administered by the Civil Medical Department and its successor the Department of Medical and Sanitary Services. Dr. W.R. Kynsey served as Principal Civil Medical Officer (PCMO) between 1875 and 1897 and contributed much towards the college in its early years. Kynsey Road, which runs between the National Hospital and the Faculty, is named after him.

In 1942 the Faculty of Medicine had six Departments - Physiology, Anatomy, Pathology, Medicine, Obstetrics and Gynaecology and Surgery. Departments of Public Health (Community Medicine) and Forensic Medicine were added in 1949 and 1951 respectively. At present there are 14 Departments. The Departments of Biochemistry and Pharmacology branched off from the Department of Physiology, Parasitology and Microbiology from the Department of Pathology, and Paediatrics and Psychological Medicine from the Department of Medicine. There are 5 Units in addition to these departments - the Malaria Research Unit, the Human Genetics Unit, the Molecular Biology Unit, the Medical Education Development and Research Centre (MEDARC), and the Audio-Visual Unit. From 25 students in 1870, the student number increased to about 500 in the '60s and 1533 at present. The staff strength too has increased considerably.

== Current status ==
The Faculty at present provides for the education and training of undergraduates in allied health sciences. The course in Pharmacy is a well established one at the faculty while that for Physiotherapy is now three years old. In addition courses ranging from medico-legal sciences to those in medical education are regularly conducted. There is also a strong ethics review committee for processing of research projects and training of staff in ethical practices. These have provided for an innovative and vibrant academic environment within the faculty.

In the future the faculty is gearing itself for the rapid changes in the health and medical educational needs of the country. It has taken the steps towards using advanced technologies by forward thinking. In doing so it is our (whose?) intention to establish and strengthen Inter departmental, inter faculty, inter – university and international links.

The Faculty has close links with several hospitals for teaching, training, clinical services and research. These include;

- The National Hospital of Sri Lanka (Colombo General Hospital)
- De Soysa Maternity Hospital (DMH)
- Castle Street Hospital for Women (CSHW)
- Lady Ridgeway Hospital for Children
- National Eye Hospital - Sri Lanka
- National Cancer Institute, Maharagama
- National Institute for Mental Health, Angoda

== Notable alumni ==
- Professor Sir Nicholas Attygalle, KBE, FRCS, FRCOG - former President of the Senate of Ceylon, Vice Chancellor of University of Ceylon, Dean of the Faculty of Medicine & Professor of Obstetrics and Gynaecology
- Professor Carlo Fonseka - former dean of the Faculty of Medicine, University of Kelaniya
- I. M. R. A. Iriyagolle - former Minister of Education
- Sir Ratnasothy Saravanamuttu - former Mayor of Colombo
- Professor Sir Sabaratnam Arulkumaran, FRCOG, FRCS - former President of the Royal College of Obstetricians and Gynaecologists (2007–2010)
- Professor Sanath Lamabathusooriya, MBE - former Dean of the Medical Faculty, University of Colombo
- Professor Sunitha Wickramasinghe, FRCP - Deputy Dean of the Imperial College School of Medicine and Professor of Haematology
- Deshamanya Dr P. R. Anthonis, FRCS - former Chancellor of University of Colombo
- Deshamanya Professor AH Sheriffdeen - pioneer in vascular and transplant surgery in Sri Lanka
- Vidyajyothi Professor Rezvi Sheriff, FRCP - Professor of Medicine, University of Colombo
- Professor Devaka Fernando - Professor of Medicine, University of Sri jayawardanapura
- Professor Ravindra fernando - Professor of Forensic Medicine
- Professor Harendra de Silva - Founder Chairman Child Protection Authority and Professor of Paediatrics, University of Kelaniya
- Professor Tissa Vitarana - Former member of Sri Lanka Parliament
- Sudarshani Fernandopulle - Member of Sri Lanka Parliament
- Lasantha Malawige - Founder Lassana Flora
- Dayan Rajapaksa - Founder Chairman Esoft
- Neil Jayasuriya- Adjunct Senior Lecturer, Monash University, General Surgeon, Fellow of Royal Australasian College of Surgeons, Australia

== Current Chairs and Heads of Departments and Special Units ==
Dean: Prof. Vajira Dissanayake

Anatomy

- Chair: Prof. Vajira Dissanayake
- Head: Prof. Hemali Goonasekera

Physiology

- Chair: Prof. Sudarshini Wasalathanthri
- Head: Prof. Lakmali Amarasiri

Biochemistry & Molecular Biology

- Chair : Prof. Sunethra Athukorale
- Head :Dr. Kithmini Sirideva

Pathology

- Chair: Prof. Chandu de Silva
- Head: Prof. Chandu de Silva

Pharmacology & Pharmacy

- Chair: Prof. Laal Jayakody
- Head: Prof. Priyadarshani Galapptthy

Microbiology

- Chair: Prof. Jennifer Perera
- Head: Dr. Channa Senanayake

Parasitology

- Chair and Head: Prof. Nadeera Karunaweera

Community Medicine

- Chair: Prof. Dulitha Fernando.
- Head: Dr. Wasantha Gunathunga

Forensic Medicine & Toxicology

- Chair: Prof. Jean Perera
- Head: Dr. Asela Mendis

Clinical Medicine

- Chair: Prof. Saroj Jayasinghe
- Head: Prof. Godwin Constantine

Surgery

- Chair and Head: Prof. Mandika Wijeyratne

Paediatrics

- Chair and Head: Prof. Manouri P. Senanayake

Obstetrics and Gynaecology

- Chair and Head: Prof. Harshalal Rukka Senevirathne

Psychological Medicine

- Chair:
- Head: Prof. Raveen Hanwella

Malaria Research Unit

- Director: Prof. Nadeera Karunaweera

Human Genetics Unit

- Director: Prof. Rohan W. Jayasekera

Medical Education and Research Centre

- Director: Prof. Indika Karunaratne

== Chairs of Study Streams ==
Introductory Basic Sciences Stream

- Chairperson: Dr. Mangala Gunathilake, Department of Physiology

Applied Sciences Stream

- Chairperson: Prof. Anuja Abeydeera, Department of Surgery

Community Stream

- Chairperson: Dr. Nalika Gunawardena, Department of Community Medicine

Behavioural Sciences Stream

- Chairperson: Prof. Wasantha Gunathunga, Department of Community Medicine

Clinical Sciences Stream

- Chairperson: Prof. Ariyaranee Gnanathasan, Department of Medicine

== See also ==
- University of Colombo
