= Postgraduate Institute of Medicine =

Medicine Institute of the University of Colombo in Sri Lanka

The Postgraduate Institute of Medicine (PGIM) of the University of Colombo is the graduate school that provides specialist training and board certification of medical doctors in Sri Lanka. The only type of its kind, it is similar to the prestigious Royal Medical Colleges of the United Kingdom.

Internationally known for its training programs, the center was established in 1976 as the Institute of Postgraduate Medicine under the University of Ceylon Act No.1 of 1976 with Professor K. N. Seneviratne its first director. In 1980 it was reorganized and renamed under the Postgraduate Institute of Medicine Act No.1 of 1980.

It is the only institute in Sri Lanka responsible for conducting postgraduate programs in medicine; and its MD program requires a minimum of one year of training in a recognized institute in the UK, Australia, New Zealand, Singapore, or India. Areas of specialty include Anaesthesiology, Community Medicine, Emergency Medicine, Dental Surgery, Family Medicine and General Practice, General Medicine (Internal Medicine), Medical Microbiology, Obstetrics and Gynaecology, Oncology, Ophthalmology, Pathology, Paediatrics, Psychiatry, Radiology and Surgery.

Recent past directors include Rezvi Sheriff (appointed in 2006) and Janaka de Silva (appointed January 4, 2014). The current director is Senaka Rajapakse (appointed April 1, 2020).
