= National Hospital of Sri Lanka =

- Ministry of Health, Sri Lanka

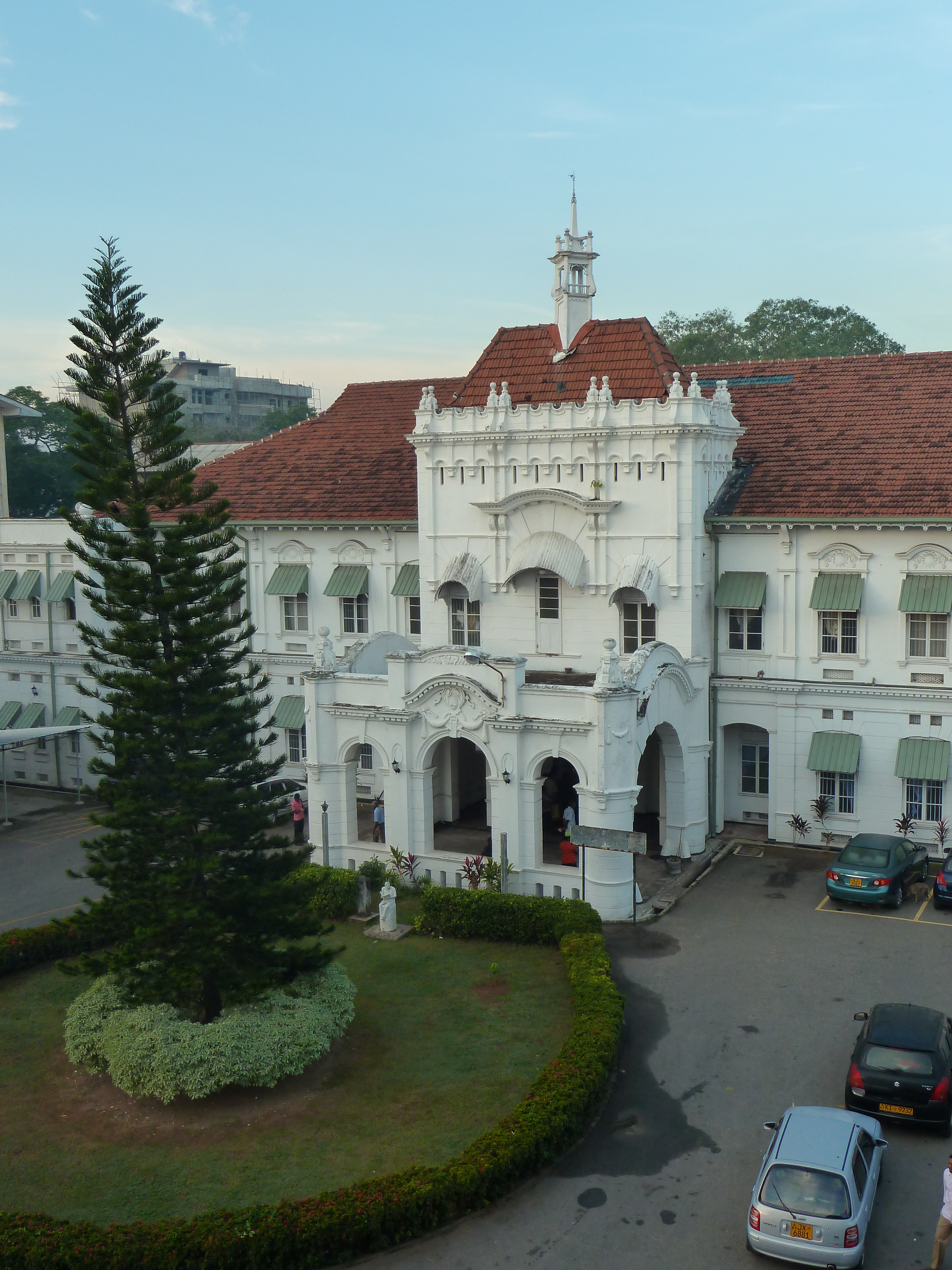

- Location in central Colombo

Geography
- Location: E. W. Perera mawatha, Colombo 10, Sri Lanka
- Coordinates: 6.919144°N 79.868027°E

Organisation
- Care system: Public
- Type: Teaching
- Affiliated university: University of Colombo

Services
- Emergency department: Yes
- Beds: 3,404 (2020)

Helipads
- Helipad: 32 acre

History
- Founded: 1864; 162 years ago

Links
- Website: nhsl.health.gov.lk
- Lists: Hospitals in Sri Lanka

The National Hospital of Sri Lanka (sometimes General Hospital) is a government hospital in Colombo, Sri Lanka. Founded in 1864 as the General Hospital, it is the leading hospital in Sri Lanka and is controlled by the central government. The hospital has 18 intensive care units and 21 operating theaters and 3,404 beds. It employs 7,500 staff of which 1,500 are doctors. The hospital carries out 5,000 major and minor surgeries each month and treats over two million out patients a year. Situated on a 36-acre site, it includes the Dental Institute, Maligawatte Kidney Hospital, Nurse's Training School, Post Basic Nurse's Training School, School of Eco Cardiograph, School of Physiotherapy, School of Radiography and the University of Colombo's Faculty of Medicine.

== History ==
In 1817 Deputy Inspector General of Hospitals Charles Farell recommended to the British Governor Robert Brownrigg that a hospital for the poor be established. Thus Colombo's first modern hospital was established in 1819 (Note: Other sources state that the Pettah Hospital was founded in 1861.) at Prince Street in Pettah. The hospital had 100 beds but demand was so high the hospital became overcrowded and a decision was taken to build a new hospital at a 32-acre cinnamon land in Longden Place. Governor Henry George Ward's administration set aside £3,000 to establish the hospital. The new 200 bed General Hospital opened in 1864.

The hospital had 21 wards in 1864. When the Colombo Medical School was established in 1870 it was based at the hospital's female surgical ward. In 1875 Mudaliyar Samson Rajapakse gifted three and a half acres of land on which Colombo Medical School's successor, the Faculty of Medicine, University of Colombo, stands today. The hospital became the first in the country to employ female nurses with the arrival of an English nurse in 1878. The hospital found it difficult to recruit nurses locally so the hospital authorities requested the help of Catholic nuns who served in the hospital from 1886 to 1964.

The hospital had 22 wards and 212 beds, 112 for the medical unit and 100 for the surgical unit, in 1885. By 1894 hospital had 24 wards and 280 beds. Longden Place was named Kynsey Road in 1900. The Victoria Memorial Building (eye ward) and the White House (administration building) were opened in 1903 and 1904 respectively. The first out patient department was founded in 1910 (now it is the main x-ray unit). Overcrowding at the hospital resulted in an annex being opened at Ragama for elderly and chronically ill patients but a cholera outbreak in 1912 resulted in these patients being transferred back to the Kynsey Road site.

Governor William Manning opened Merchant Ward (currently Ward No. 15) in October 1918. The Skinner Memorial Ward was established and adjoining it the Gnanasekaram Ward was built in 1924. These two wards are currently known as Ward No. 16. Physiotherapy and rheumatology units were added in the 1920s A private home on Ward Place was converted into a dental clinic in 1925 and the radiology unit was established in the administration building in 1926. The Marque Memorial Ward was established in 1938 for the Catholic nun nurses whilst the Coudert Memorial Ward was established in 1941 for Christian clergymen. The Khan Memorial Ward (Ward No. 51) was established in 1939 to treat paediatric orthopaedic patients. Colombo College of Nursing was founded on 9 May 1939.

When the University of Ceylon was established in 1942, the General Hospital was chosen to be its teaching hospital. Paying wards such as Matapan Ward were established in 1943. 1952 saw the building of hospital kitchens and the first cardiothoracic unit. The hospital's first open-heart surgery took place in 1955. An electrocardiography (ECG) unit was opened on 1 November 1955. The College of Physiotherapy and the School of Radiology, both affiliated with the General Hospital, were founded in 1957. The Bandaranaike Building (administration and surgery) was opened on 2 February 1958 by Prime Minister S. W. R. D. Bandaranaike. Eye care moved to the newly created Eye Hospital in 1965 and on 1 January 1967 an accident ward was opened in the vacated Victoria Memorial Building by Prime Minister Dudley Senanayake. Ceylon's first intensive care unit was opened in the Surgical Complex by Minister of Health E. L. Senanayake on 16 June 1968. A mental health ward (Ward No. 59) was founded in the late 1960s. Plastic surgery was introduced in 1970 in Ward No. 4. The Coronary Care Unit was opened in 1973. The Burn Unit started on 28 October 1974 in Lady de Soysa Ward.

In 1979 the Sri Lankan and Finnish governments entered into an agreement to renovate the General Hospital, with 85% of the funding coming from Finns. Numerous projects were carried out as a result of the agreement including the complete refurbishment of the accident, emergency, orthopaedic and trauma units, the establishment of the training unit and laundry, and the building of a new mortuary. The Renal Transplant Unit was opened on 6 May 1987. A new accident ward was opened by President Ranasinghe Premadasa on 15 March 1991. The Medical Ward Complex was opened by President Chandrika Kumaratunga on 1 February 1995. On 31 January 1996 the hospital had to treat 1,200 victims of the Colombo Central Bank bombing. The Neurotrauma Unit, funded by the Saudi Arabian government, was opened by President Mahinda Rajapaksa on 31 March 2011. Rajapaksa opened the third Medical Ward Complex on 19 April 2013.
