= 2005 Sri Lankan national honours =

In November 2005 President of Sri Lanka Chandrika Kumaratunga awarded national honours to 231 individuals for distinguished services. The awards ceremony was held on 14 November 2005 at the Bandaranaike Memorial International Conference Hall in Colombo.

== Sri Lankabhimanya ==
Two individuals received the Sri Lankabhimanya honour:

1. Arthur C. Clarke (1917–2008), writer
2. Lakshman Kadirgamar (1932–2005), politician (posthumous)

== Deshamanya ==
Thirty one individuals received the Deshamanya honour:

1. William Alwis
2. Mahesh Amalean (born 1955), engineer
3. Sohli E. Captain
4. Radhika Coomaraswamy (born 1953), diplomat
5. Lalith de Mel
6. Rohan de Saram (born 1939), musician
7. Chandrananda de Silva
8. Ashley de Vos, architect
9. Jayaratne Banda Dissanayake
10. M. T. A. Furkhan
11. Basil Gunasekara (born 1929), soldier
12. Cyril Herath (died 2011), police officer
13. A. S. Jayawardena (1936–2018), economist
14. Asoka Jayawardena, soldier
15. Harry Jayawardena (born 1942), businessman
16. Nihal Jinasena (born 1940), businessman
17. Premasiri Khemadasa (1937–2008), composer
18. W. D. Lakshman, economist
19. Paddy Mendis (born 1933), air man
20. Sunil Mendis, accountant
21. J. B. Peiris, physician
22. M. D. D. Peiris
23. Denis Perera (1930–2013), soldier
24. P. Ramanathan (1932–2006), judge
25. P. Deva Rodrigo
26. Mano Selvanathan
27. A. H. Sheriffdeen, surgeon
28. Roland Silva
29. Bradman Weerakoon (born 1930), civil servant
30. Kandekumara Hapudoragamage Jothiyarathna Wijayadasa
31. Ray Wijewardene (1924–2010), engineer

== Deshabandu ==
Thirty eight individuals received the Deshabandu honour:

1. Tissa Abeysekara (1939–2009), filmmaker
2. Joe Abeywickrama (1927–2011), actor
3. A. L. M. Abusali
4. Don Chandraprema Patrick Amarasinghe
5. Sivaramalingam Anandacoomaraswamy
6. Ranjit Atapattu (1933–2018), politician
7. Senaka Dias Bandaranayake
8. M. A. Careem
9. Vajira Chithrasena
10. Lyn de Alwis
11. Lakshman de Mel
12. Siran Upendra Deraniyagala (born 1942), archaeologist
13. Tuley de Silva
14. Tilak de Soysa
15. A. E. T. Ellawala
16. Lionel Fernando, civil servant
17. Reginald George Bernard Forbes
18. Olcott Gunasekera
19. Kapila Gunawardena
20. Jinadasa Guruge
21. Macky Hashim
22. Harold Herath (1930–2007), politician
23. Indradasa Hettiarachchi, politician
24. Osmund Jayaratne (1924–2006), academic
25. S. D. R. Jayaratne
26. Swarana Jayaweera
27. Saddhamangala Karunaratne
28. Stanley Kirinde
29. A. N. S. Kulasinghe (1919–2006), engineer
30. Vivendra Lintotawela
31. N. Navaratnarajah
32. Tony Ranasinghe (1937–2015), actor
33. Diyanath Samarasinghe
34. K. P. Silva
35. Kirthi Tennakone, scientist
36. C. G. Uragoda, physician
37. D. P. Wickremasinghe
38. Suriya Wickremasinghe

== Veera Chudamani ==
One individual received the Veera Chudamani honour:

1. Hettiarachchige Gamini Sirisoma Jayasekera

== Vidya Jyothi ==
Thirteen individuals received the Vidya Jyothi honour:

1. Damian Nobert Lakshman Alwis
2. Janaka de Silva, academic
3. Wijaya Godakumbura, surgeon
4. Colvin Gunaratne
5. A. D. S. Gunawardena
6. Mohan Jayatilake
7. Eric H. Karunanayake
8. S. Mahalingam (1926–2015), academic
9. E. W. Marasinghe
10. Lalitha Mendis
11. S. Mohanadas, academic
12. Damitha Ramanayake
13. Dayantha Wijeyesekera (born 1942), academic

== Kala Keerthi ==
Forty two individuals received the Kala Keerthi honour:

1. Tilak Abeysinghe
2. Jackson Anthony (born 1958), actor
3. Dharmasiri Bandaranayake (born 1949), film director
4. S. Pani Bharatha (posthumous)
5. A. J. Canagarathnam
6. Olga de Livera
7. Enid Anula Aluvihare de Silva
8. Malini Fonseka (born 1947), actress
9. T. B. Richard M. Don Gabriel
10. Gnarathan
11. Sanath Gunathilake (born 1955), actor
12. Asoka Handagama, filmmaker
13. Gamini Haththotuwegama (1939–2009), playwright
14. Henry Jayasena (1931–2009), actor
15. Vimukthi Jayasundara (born 1977), film director
16. A. Jesurasa
17. M. Kanakasabai
18. Geetha Kumarasinghe (born 1955), actress
19. Swarna Mallawarachchi, actress
20. Jayalath Manoratne (born 1948), dramatist
21. S. Maunaguru
22. Carl Muller (born 1935), writer
23. Sanath Nandasiri (born 1942), musician
24. Simon Navagattegama (1940–2005), novelist (posthumous)
25. Vasantha Obeysekera (1937–2017), film director
26. Dharmasena Pathiraja (1943–2018), film director
27. Sumitra Peries (born 1934), filmmaker
28. Sri Jayana Rajapakse
29. Tissa Ranasinghe (born 1925), artist
30. Monica Ruwanpathirana (1946–2004), poet (posthumous)
31. Pandithar Sachchithanantham
32. Bharahmasri Sarveswara Sarma
33. Shyam Selvadurai (born 1965), novelist
34. Santhini Sevanesan
35. Kulanthai Shunmugalingam
36. A. Sivananthan
37. K. Sivathamby (1932–2011), historian
38. Somalatha Subasinghe (1936–2015), actress
39. Prasanna Vithanage (born 1962), filmmaker
40. Latha Walpola (born 1934), singer
41. Rohana Weerasinghe (born 1949), musician
42. Sybil Wettasinghe (born 1927), writer

== Sri Lanka Sikhamani ==
Thirty six individuals received the Sri Lanka Sikhamani honour:

1. R. I. T. Alles (1932–2013), teacher
2. S. Arunachalam
3. Mohamed Zainudeen Mohamed Badiudeen
4. Jayantha Balawardena
5. B. E. S. J. Bastiampillai
6. J. M. S. Brito
7. Kris Canekeratne
8. Ferrin Careem
9. Hiran Cooray
10. S. D. Gunadasa (1931–2014), businessman
11. Edgar Gunetunga
12. Mallika Hemachandra
13. H. Z. Jaffer
14. J. K. D. S. H. Jayawardena
15. Y. Karunadasa (born 1934), academic
16. Gunadasa Kupuge (posthumous)
17. Jayasiri Mendis
18. Ameena Faiz Musthapa
19. L. G. G. M. L. Mohammadu Naim
20. Gunapala Nanayakkara
21. Mahinda Palihawadana
22. Kamala Peiris
23. W. H. Piyadasa
24. M. Ramalingam
25. Daya Rathnayake
26. Z. A. M. Refai
27. Mendis Rohanadheera
28. Manik Rodrigo
29. Premila Senanayake
30. Mahamood Rizwan Shahabdeen
31. Suppiah Achari Thiagarajah
32. Sanath Ukwatte
33. Rodney Vandergert (1935–2009), diplomat
34. Tony Weerasinghe
35. Daya Weththasinghe
36. Hiranthi Wijemanne

== Vidya Nidhi ==
Thirteen individuals received the Vidya Nidhi honour:

1. S. M. H. Sena Banda
2. Raja Gnanasiri Hewa Bowala
3. Niriellage Chandrasiri
4. M. A. K. L. Dissanayake
5. C. A. N. Fernando
6. Angulugaha Gamage Lasath Namal Gamage
7. Nimal Guanthilake
8. P. Amitha Jayasinghe
9. V. Kumar
10. Shanthi Mendis
11. Chales Santiapillai
12. W. P. Siripala
13. H. H. Subasinghe

== Kala Suri ==
Thirty one individuals received the Kala Suri honour:

1. Rohana Baddage
2. Muhanned Nohideen Abdul Cader
3. Sarath Chandrajeewa
4. Pradeep Chandrasiri
5. Somaratne Dissanayake, film director
6. Udaya Shantha Fernando
7. Edward Jayakody (born 1952), musician
8. Pushpakumara Kandegedara
9. Barbara Sansoni Lewcock
10. Harsh Makalanda
11. Dulip Gabada Mudalige
12. Nelum Harasgama Nadaraja
13. Parakrama Niriella
14. M. A. Nuhuman
15. Stanley Omar
16. Janadasa Peiris
17. H. A. Perera (1950–2010), actor
18. Rohanadeva Perera
19. Anoma Rajakaruna
20. Anne Ranasinghe (1925–2016), poet
21. Chitra Ranawake
22. R. Rushankan
23. Oosha Saravanamuttu
24. Inoka Sathyangani, film director
25. Rajini Selvanayagam
26. T. Shanathanan
27. Sumathy Sivamohan
28. Chandraguptha Thenuwara
29. Subramanium Vilvaratnam
30. Jagath Weerasinghe (born 1954), artist
31. Channa Wijewardena

== Sri Lanka Thilaka ==
Four individuals received the Sri Lanka Thilaka honour:

1. T. M. Priyantha Nimal de Silva
2. Nayanatara Gitani Fonseka
3. Rohana Upendra Kuruppu
4. V. A. Thirugnanasuntharam

== Sri Lanka Rathna ==
Nine individuals received the Sri Lanka Rathna honour:

1. Bernard de Gaulle
2. Tetsuya Hino
3. Thilo W. Hoffmann
4. Michael Morris (born 1936), British politician
5. S. D. Muni
6. Hosel Norota
7. Michael Ondaatje (born 1943), Canadian poet
8. N. Ram (born 1945), Indian journalist
9. David C. Sanders

== Sri Lanka Ranjana ==
Eleven individuals received the Sri Lanka Ranjana honour:

1. Monica de Decker-Deprez
2. Geoffrey Dobbs
3. Romesh Gunesekera (born 1954), British author
4. Evert Jongens
5. Tadashi Noguchi
6. Tridev Roy (1933–2012), Pakistani politician
7. Wang Shihong
8. Wolfgang Stange
9. Baik Sung-hak
10. Sung Woan-jong
11. Robert Woods
