= 2019 Sri Lankan national honours =

In August 2019 President of Sri Lanka Maithripala Sirisena awarded national honours to 70 individuals for distinguished services. The awards ceremony was held on 19 August 2019 at the Bandaranaike Memorial International Conference Hall in Colombo.

== Deshamanya ==
- Indrajit Coomaraswamy
- Ajita de Zoysa
- Merrill Joseph Fernando
- Mohan Munasinghe
- Moragodage Christopher Walter Pinto
- Surath Wickramasinghe

== Deshabandu ==
- Edwin Ariyadasa
- Jayasuriya Mudiyanselage Raja Sarath Bandara
- Dissanayake Mudiyanselage Sri Shanthi Lakshman Dissanayake
- Wimal Dissanayake
- Muthukuda Arrachchige Dona Shiroma Jeeva
- Mohomed Ruwaiz Latiff
- Anselm Boniface Perera
- Nimal Ebenezer Herat Sanderatne
- Anura Tennekoon
- Robosingha Arachchige Sugath Thilakarathne

== Vidya Jyothi ==
- Arjuna de Silva
- Hithanadura Asita de Silva
- Vajira Harshadeva Weerabaddana Dissanayake
- Prasad Katulanda
- Serosha Mandika Wijeyaratne
- Nambunama Nanayakkara Akmeemana Palliyaguruge Bandula Chandranath Wijesiriwardena

== Kala Keerthi ==
- Mahagam Arachchige Jayantha Chandrasiri
- Jerome Lakshman de Silva
- Sathischandra Edirisinghe
- Haputantrige Leelaratne Leel Gunasekera
- Hetti Arachchige Karunaratne
- Ranaweera Arachchilage Ariyawansa Ranaweera
- Navaratna Ravibandhu Vidyapathy
- Anoja Weerasinghe
- Rathna Sri Wijesinghe

== Sri Lanka Sikhamani ==
- Anil Abeywickrama
- Tara de Mel
- Lloyd Fernando
- Jammagalage Dian Gomes
- Wimal Karandagoda
- Lakshman Ravendra Watawala
- Dinesh Stephen Weerakkody
- Anula Wijesundera

== Vidya Nidhi ==
- Joel Arudchelvam
- Mangala Gunatilake
- Mohamed Sakkaff Mohamed Rizny

== Kala Suri ==
- Panditha Mudiyanselage Karunarathna Bandara
- Sumana Aloka Bandara
- Mahinda Chandrasekara
- Prangige Ananda Kithsiri Dabare
- Kiribanda Mahinda Dissanayake
- Eric Illayapparachchi
- Mahamaddumage Hemapriya Kalanie Perera
- Palitha Perera
- Kathiresu Rathitharan
- Wijerathna Samarasekara Indika Upamali
- Wijesinghe Arachchillage Karunasiri Wijesinghe

== Sri Lanka Thilaka ==
- Singharage Sarath Chandra de Silva
- Wannakuwattewaduge Dinesh Nishantha Fernando
- Ponnambalam Jamunadevi
- Mahindadasa Wickramanayaka Karunaratne
- Samantha Sathischandra Wanniarachchi Kumarasinghe
- Jayanthi Kuru-Utumpala
- Mahinda Madihahewa
- Pera Dorapege Lalitha Padmini
- Thambiah Perinpanayagam
- Meyan Vamadevan
- Weliwita Liyana Arachchillage Premasiri Weliwita

== Veera Prathapa ==
- Heeralu Mohottalalage Keerthi Bandara Padmasiri
- Moradeniyalage Eranga Vikumsiri

== Sri Lanka Rathna ==
- Yasushi Akashi

== Sri Lanka Ranajana ==
- S. Arulkumaran
- Cumaraswamy Sivathasan
- David Alexander Young
