= 2017 Sri Lankan national honours =

In March 2017 President of Sri Lanka Maithripala Sirisena awarded national honours to 90 individuals for distinguished services. It was the first time in twelve years that awards were given out and there were 426 applicants. The awards ceremony was held on 20 March 2017 at the Nelum Pokuna Theatre in Colombo.

== Sri Lankabhimanya ==
- W. D. Amaradeva

== Deshamanya ==
- Abbasally Akbarally
- K. M. de Silva
- Tissa Devendra
- Colvin De Fonseka Warnasuriya Goonaratna
- Thalagalage Amaradasa Gunawardana
- Devanesan Nesiah
- Diyunuge Nandadasa Rajapaksha
- Priyani Soysa
- Latha Walpola
- Mineka Presantha Wickramasingha

== Deshabandu ==
- Leslie Shelton Devendra
- Deivanayagam Eassuwaren
- Susanthika Jayasinghe
- Mahinkande Gamladdalage Kularatne
- Ranjan Madugalle
- Thommadura Pabilis Silva
- Lakshman Lucian de Silva Weerasena
- W. K. H. Wegapitiya
- Shan Wickremesinghe

== Vidya Jyothi ==
- Lal Gotabhaya Chandrasena
- Harendra de Silva
- Errol Radcliffe Jansz
- Moderage Marian Rohan Waas Jayasekara
- Sarath Kotagama
- Mahamendige Wilfred Joseph Gerard Mendis
- Colvin Ananda Samarasinghe
- De Silva T. K. Nimal Padmasena
- Alagiyawanna Mohotti Appuhamillage Nimal Kitsiri Senanayake
- Tissa Vitharana
- Bandula Wijayarathna

== Kala Keerthi ==
- Wijesinghe Arachchilage Abeysingha
- Hapuwalanege Don Ariyadasa (Dasa Hapuwalana)
- Arun Dias Bandaranaike
- Lionel Bentharage
- Herman Ronald Lakshman De Alwis
- Nellampitiya Pathirana Arachchige Dayawathi (Daya Nellampitiya)
- Ivor Dennis
- Ranasinghe Arachchige Jayantha Prema Lal Hegoda
- Gunawardhana Mudalige Ajith Hemachandra
- George Edmond Jayasinghe
- Sumana Jayatillake
- Sunanda Mahendra
- Suresh Maliyadde
- G. Kartini Drahaman Mohamed
- Camillus Perera
- Edmand Ranasinghe
- Madhubhashini Disanayaka Ratnayaka
- Lalitha Sarathchandra
- Suminda Sirisena
- Singarampillai Thillanadarajah
- Saravanai Vinayagamoorthy
- Namel Weeramuni

== Sri Lanka Sikhamani ==
- Hetti Arachchige Piyadasa Abeywardane
- Achi Mohamed Ishaq
- Chulamani Gedara Gunasoma Nawarathne
- S. Pathmanathan
- Leelananda Prematilleke
- Krishnamoorthi Ratnam Ravindran
- Sellapuliyage Lucian Benedict Rosa
- R. I. T. Alles

== Vidya Nidhi ==
- Don Tilak Dias Jayaweera Abeysekera
- Ahmed Mumtaz Masoon Cassim
- Vithanage Nimal Chandrasiri Gunasekera
- Herath Peruma Mudiyanselage Gunasena
- Sarath Somasiri Gunawardhana
- Mariapillai Sellamuthu Pillai Mookiah
- Lekamage Ramsay Lloyd Perera
- Somasundaram Sandarasegaram
- S. Sivananthan
- Wanninayake Mudiyanselage Tikiri Banda Wanninayake

== Kala Suri ==
- Pahalage Sarath Vijaya de Silva Abeygunawardana
- Arumadura Praneeth Nishad De Silva Abhayasundere
- Sriyani Amarasena
- Lucien Bulathsinhala
- Premasara Epasinghe
- Nita Fernando
- Nawarathne Gamage
- Mestiyage Don Bertie Sangathissa Gunathilaka
- Hasantha Srilal Hettiarachchi
- Weerappulige Jayasiri
- Cathleen Jayawardana
- Tissa Mahanama Nagodawithana
- Sumithra Rahubadda
- Sella Hennedige Sarath

== Sri Lanka Thilaka ==
- Adagamage Pandula Adagama
- Hema Bandara Jayasinghe

== Veera Prathapa ==
- Aluth Gedara Ranjith Amarajeewa
- Rankoth Gedara Shanaka Prasad Kumara

== Sri Lanka Ranajana ==
- Sarath Gunapala
- Siddhartha Kaul
