= 1998 Sri Lankan national honours =

In April 1998 President of Sri Lanka Chandrika Kumaratunga awarded national honours to 78 individuals for distinguished services to mark the golden jubilee of Sri Lankan independence.

== Deshamanya ==
Fourteen individuals received the Deshamanya honour:

1. Ranjit Abeysuriya (1932–2014), lawyer
2. W. D. Amaradeva (1927–2016), musician
3. Ken Balendra (born 1940), businessman
4. Chitrasena (1921–2005), dancer
5. Charitha Prasanna de Silva
6. H. L. de Silva (1928–2009), lawyer
7. R. K. W. Goonesekera (born 1928), academic
8. Tamara Ilangaratne (born 1925), politician
9. A. T. Kovoor (1898–1978), academic
10. Vernon Mendis (1925–2010), diplomat
11. Christopher Rajindra Panabokke
12. Duncan White (1918–1998), athlete
13. Doreen Winifred Wickramasinghe
14. Elanga Wikramanayake, lawyer

== Deshabandu ==
Seventeen individuals received the Deshabandu honour:

1. P. T. de Silva (1929–2015), physician
2. Adhikari Mudiyanselage Dharmasena
3. Thambimuttu Duraisingam
4. S. D. Gunadasa (1931–2014), businessman
5. Muhammed Abdul Hameed Muhammed Hussain
6. Nowfer Saly Jabir
7. Kolamba Patabendige Tissaweera Siriwardana Jinasena
8. M. G. Mendis (1911–2000), trade unionist
9. Chasnyn Musafer
10. Rajapakse Pathirannehelage Jayaratne Pathirana
11. Minuwanpitiyage Darmasiri Dayananda Pieris
12. M. J. Perera (1915–2002), broadcaster
13. Seekkubaduge Wilbert Silva
14. Ananda Daivin Soysa
15. Rajadurai Sellaiah Thanabalasundaram
16. Balaupasakage Yasodis Thudawe
17. Puvaneshwari Vaithianathan

== Veera Chudamani ==
One individual received the Veera Chudamani honour:

1. Manorani Sarawanamuttu

== Vidya Jyothi ==
Nine individuals received the Vidya Jyothi honour:

1. Arjuna Aluwihare
2. Senaka Dias Bandaranayake
3. M. A. Careem
4. C. B. Dissanayake
5. D. P. Anura Fernando
6. J. B. Peiris, physician
7. V. K. Samaranayake (1939–2007), academic
8. Diyanath Samarasinghe
9. R. O. Barnes Wijesekera

== Kala Keerthi ==
Five individuals received the Kala Keerthi honour:

1. Dharmasiri Jayakody
2. Nalini Jayasuriya
3. Premasiri Khemadasa (1937–2008), composer
4. Iranganie Serasinghe (born 1927), actress
5. Regi Siriwardena (1922–2004), academic

== Vidya Nidhi ==
Three individuals received the Vidya Nidhi honour:

1. Norman Rienzie de Silva
2. S. K. Sayakkara
3. Prematilake Wijesekera

== Kala Suri ==
Nine individuals received the Kala Suri honour:

1. Tissa Abeysekara (1939–2009), filmmaker
2. Dharmasiri Bandaranayake (born 1949), film director
3. D. V. Richard de Silva
4. Parakrama Kodituwakku, poet
5. Jayalath Manoratne (born 1948), dramatist
6. J. S. B. Jaya Rani Perera
7. S. A D. D. Samarasekera
8. A. Sivanesa Selvan
9. Jiffry Yoonoos

== Sri Lanka Thilaka ==
Sixteen individuals received the Sri Lanka Thilaka honour:

1. Karunapala Aprakke
2. K. Arnis
3. G. Liyanage David
4. U. M. Haniffa
5. H. K. Hettiarachchi
6. K. S. Jayasena
7. W. Jayathilaka
8. M. R. T. Karunaratne
9. Edmund Opanayake
10. S. V. P. Tikiri Panikkiya
11. Kuragala Pinsara
12. D. C. M. Piyatilake
13. Sunil Premadasa
14. G. S. B. Senanayake
15. T. A. Sirisena
16. Piyadasa Wickramanayake

== Veera Prathapa ==
Three individuals received the Veera Prathapa honour:

1. O. R. A. K. Perera
2. Amithapala Weerasinghe
3. R. P. R. Wickramapala

== Sri Lanka Rathna ==
One individual received the Sri Lanka Rathna honour:

1. Susumu Saegi
