= Thisuri =

Thisuri is a given name. Notable people with the name include:

- Thisuri Wanniarachchi, Sri Lankan author
- Thisuri Yuwanika (born 1991), Sri Lankan actress
