= 2023 Sri Lankan national honours =

In February 2023, President Ranil Wickremesinghe awarded the highest national honour of Sri Lanka to former Speaker of the Parliament Karu Jayasuriya.

== Sri Lankabhimanya ==
- Karu Jayasuriya
