= Sri Lanka Mitra Vibhushana =

Sri Lankan honour

Sri Lanka Mitra Vibhushana ශ්‍රී ලංකා මිත්‍ර විභූෂණ சிறீ லங்கா மித்ர விபூஷண

Awarded by The Government of Sri Lanka
- Type: Title of honor/Order of merit
- Established: 2008
- Ribbon
- Eligibility: Foreign nationals
- Criteria: Exceptional and distinguished service to the nation
- Status: Currently constituted

Statistics
- First induction: 2008
- Last induction: 2025
- Total inductees: 4

Precedence
- Next (higher): Veera Prathapa
- Next (lower): Sri Lanka Rathna

The Sri Lanka Mitra Vibhushana (Sinhala: ශ්‍රී ලංකා මිත්‍ර විභූෂණ, Tamil: சிறீ லங்கா மித்ர விபூஷண, Sri Lankan Friendship Decoration) is a distinguished honor awarded by the Government of Sri Lanka to foreign Heads of State and Heads of Government. Established in February 2008 by President Mahinda Rajapaksa, this accolade recognizes exceptional and distinguished service to the nation, particularly in fostering friendly relations and solidarity with the people of Sri Lanka.

== Significance of the award ==
The Sri Lanka Mitra Vibhushana holds a prestigious position among Sri Lanka's national honors, taking precedence over other awards conferred upon non-Sri Lankans. It serves as a testament to the recipient's exceptional role in enhancing diplomatic relations and reflects Sri Lanka's appreciation for international leaders who have demonstrated unwavering friendship and support. The meticulous design of the medal, incorporating culturally significant symbols and precious gems, embodies the deep-rooted connections and mutual respect between Sri Lanka and the honored individuals.

In essence, the Sri Lanka Mitra Vibhushana not only honors distinguished foreign leaders but also symbolizes Sri Lanka's commitment to nurturing and acknowledging international friendships that contribute to the nation's growth and global standing.

=== Design and symbolism of the medal ===
The decoration comprises a silver medal adorned with nine types of Sri Lankan gems, known as Navaratna. The medal features symbolic elements:

- Dharmachakra (Wheel of Dharma): Reflects the shared Buddhist heritage between Sri Lanka and the recipient's nation.
- Purna Kalasha (Ceremonial Pitcher): Adorned with sheaves of rice, symbolizing prosperity and renewal.
- Navaratna (Nine Precious Gems): Represents the enduring and priceless friendship between the two countries, depicted within a globe encircled by pure lotus petals.
- Sun and Moon: Signify the timeless bond stretching from the ancient past into the infinite future.

The accompanying ribbon is 6.5 cm wide, and the medal is designed to be worn around the neck. Recipients also receive a citation detailing their contributions.

== Notable recipients ==
Since its inception, the Sri Lanka Mitra Vibhushana has been conferred upon a select group of distinguished leaders:

- Maumoon Abdul Gayoom (President of the Maldives): Awarded on 13 February 2008.
- Mahmoud Abbas (President of the Palestinian National Authority): Awarded on 2 January 2014.
- Yasser Arafat (Posthumous, Former President of the Palestinian National Authority): Awarded on 2 January 2014.
- Narendra Modi (Prime Minister of India): Awarded on 5 April 2025.

== Recipients ==
List of Sri Lanka Mitra Vibhushana award recipients
#	Year	Recipient	Field	Conferred by
1	2008	Maumoon Abdul Gayoom (1937)	President of Maldives	Mahinda Rajapaksa
2	2014	Mahmoud Abbas (1935)	President of the Palestinian National Authority	Mahinda Rajapaksa
3	2014	Yasser Arafat (1929–2008)	Former President of the Palestinian National Authority	Mahinda Rajapaksa
4	2025	Narendra Modi (1950)	Prime Minister of India	Anura Kumara Dissanayake

Living recipient	Posthumous recipient
