= Monica Ruwanpathirana =

Sri Lankan poet and writer (1946–2004)

- Born: 26 February 1946; Matara, Ceylon
- Died: 10 July 2004 (aged 58); Colombo, Sri Lanka
- Education: St. Thomas' Girls' High School, Sanghamitta Balika Vidyalaya, University of Colombo
- Occupation: poetry
- Awards: Kala Keerthi (Posthumous) (2005)

Kala Keerthi Monica Ruwanpathirana (Sinhala: මොනිකා රුවන්පතිරණ) (1946 – 2004) was a Sri Lankan poet and writer. She is considered one of the most acclaimed poets in modern Sinhala poetry. She has written 23 books, including nineteen poetry and three of them won the State Literary Award. In 2005, she was honored by Government of Sri Lanka with the reputation of Kala Keerthi.

Born in a village in Matara, Monica had her education at St. Thomas' Girls' High School, Galle and Sanghamitta Balika Vidyalaya. In 1967, she graduated from the University of Colombo and joined the Plan Implementation Ministry where she worked for eleven years. Later she started working for an NGO as a director. She died at the age of 58.

== Publications ==
Her books of verse include,

- Apa Denna Saha Thawath Kihipa Denek (1971)
- Thahanam Deshayakin (1972)
- Angulimalage Sihina (1974)
- Oba Yeheliya Eya Geheniya (1975)
- Athuru Mithuru (1981)
- Age Lokaya (1985)
- Visi Vasaka Shesha Pathraya (1994)
- Asan Paththini Devathavi (1999)
- Hippocrates Saha Roginiya

Short stories

- Kusumalathage Dawasak (A Day in the Life of Kusumalatha, 1990)

Critical essays

- Nava Kavi Vimasuma
