= Vini Vitharana =

Sri Lankan university professor and lecturer

- Born: 2 June 1928; Tangalle,
- Died: 2 December 2019 (aged 91)
- Education: Christ Church College, Mahinda College
- Alma mater: University of Ceylon, University of Peradeniya, University of London
- Occupations: scholar, professor, lecturer, educator
- Known for: contributions to Sinhala literature
- Awards: UNESCO award (1962); Kala Keerthi (1993)

Kala Keerthi Vini Vitharana (Sinhala: විනී විතාරණ) (2 June 1928 – 2 December 2019) was a Sri Lankan Sinhalese linguist, professor, lecturer and a scholar. 1 He was well known for his significant contributions to Sinhala literature. During his lifetime, he was rated as one of the prominent notable educators in the country.

== Career ==
Vitharana had completed his primary education at the Christ Church College in Tangalle and pursued his secondary school education at Mahinda College, Galle. He obtained bachelor's degrees from the University of Ceylon and University of London. He completed his doctorate in Philosophy in 1966 at the University of Peradeniya.

He served as an assistant editor of the Sinhala Encyclopedia from 1957 to 1959 for a period of two years. In 1960, he became a visiting lecturer at the Vidyodaya University. He was a recipient of a UNESCO award for his notable contributions to Sinhala literature in 1962. He received the prestigious Kala Keerthi award from the Government of Sri Lanka in 1993.

== Death ==
He died on 2 December 2019 at the age of 91 in the early morning due to illness. The funeral was held in Borella on 4 December 2019.
