= Jayanthi Kuru-Utumpala =

Sri Lankan mountaineer and women's rights activist

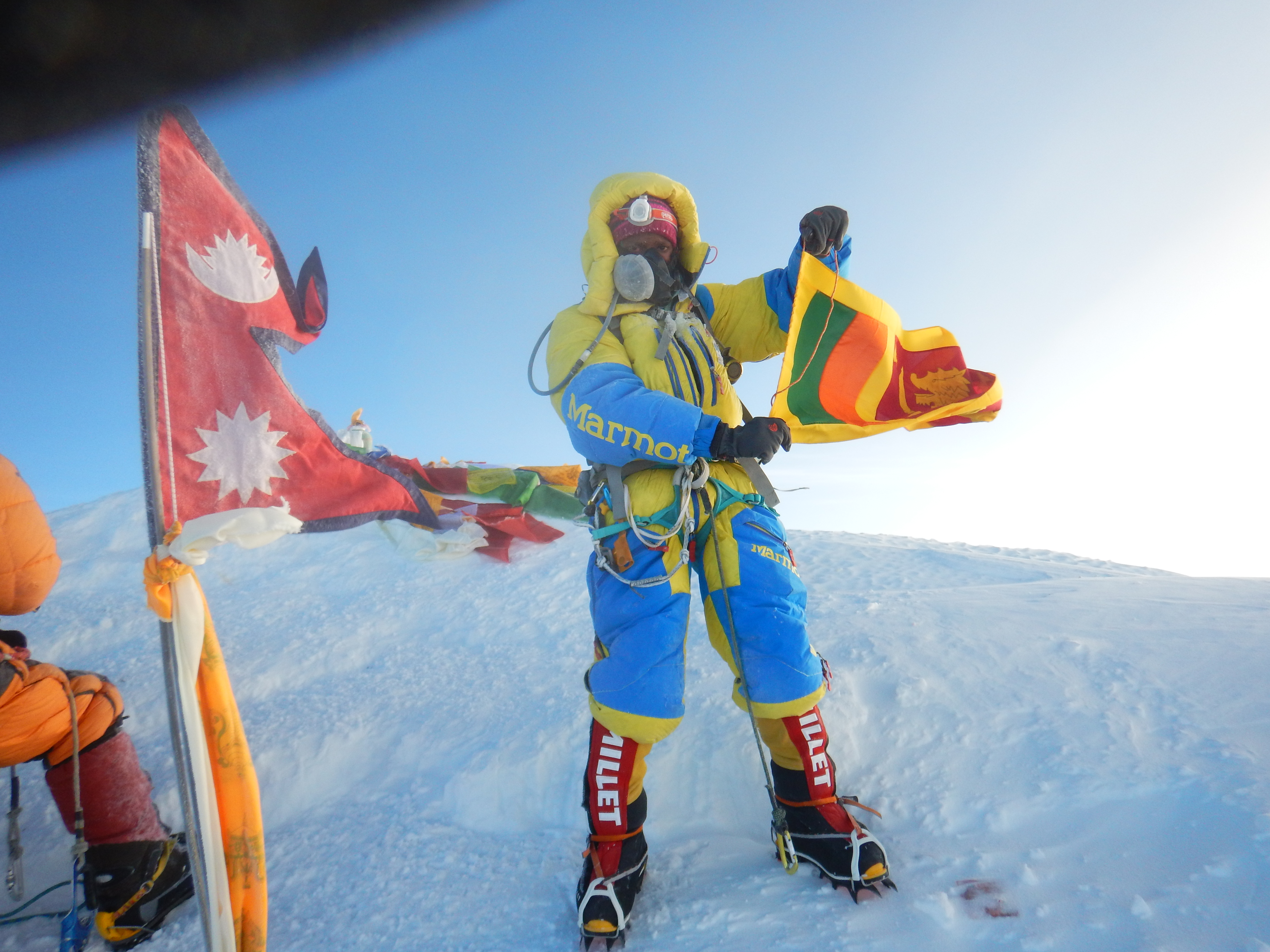
- Jayanthi Kuru-Utumpala waving the Sri Lankan flag on the summit of Mount Everest at 5:03 a.m. on 21 May 2016

Personal information
- Nationality: Sri Lankan
- Born: Jayanthi Kuru-Utumpala; 3 September 1979 (age 46) Colombo, Western Province, Sri Lanka
- Education: Bishop's College

Climbing career
- Major ascents: First Sri Lankan to Summit Mount Everest; First Sri Lankan Woman to Summit Imja Tse (Island Peak) 6,189m

Jayanthi Kuru-Utumpala (Sinhala: ජයන්ති කුරු උතුම්පාල, born 3 September 1979) is a Sri Lankan women’s rights activist with 20 years of experience and a rock climber / mountaineer for nearly as long. She has worked at national, regional, and global levels as a technical advisor, advocate, trainer, researcher, and program manager on issues relating to gender, gender-based violence, sexuality, masculinity, women’s human rights, and more recently, women in sports. In 2016, she became the first Sri Lankan to summit Mount Everest. In recognition of this achievement, from 2016-2019 she was appointed the Goodwill Ambassador for Women's Rights by the Sri Lankan Ministry of Women's Affairs. In 2017, she was also included in the BBC’s list of 100 inspiring and influential women from around the world. In 2023, she was the recipient of the International Olympic Committee’s Gender Equality, Diversity and Inclusion Champions Award for Asia (Olympic Council of Asia) (The National Olympic Committee of Sri Lanka (NOC SL)). Since returning from Everest, she has delivered over 500 motivational speeches, to schools, universities, clubs, professional sports teams, corporate entities, government, and non-governmental organizations, as well as the military and police. She is currently the Gender and Human Rights Advisor at the Family Planning Association in Sri Lanka, working to address stigma and discrimination faced by people seeking HIV services, and is a co-creator of ‘Delete Nothing’ – a local web-based initiative aimed at addressing online gender-based violence in Sri Lanka. Jayanthi serves on several boards and is the current Chairperson of the Women and Media Collective and the International Centre for Ethnic Studies. She is also a trustee of the ‘Women of the World Foundation’, a UK-based charity. Jayanthi holds an MA in Gender Studies from the University of Sussex (UK) and a post graduate diploma in Women’s Studies from the University of Colombo. For more details, find her on LinkedIn.

== Biography ==
Jayanthi Kuru-Utumpala was born on 3 September 1979 in Colombo. Her father Nissanka is a mechanical engineer and her mother Jacinta was a manager in the hospitality industry. Her elder brother Rukshan attended the S. Thomas' College in Mount Lavinia. She was described as a fearless person at her young age by her brother.

== Career ==
Kuru-Utumpala joined Bishop's College in 1984 for her primary education and also pursued her secondary education at the same school until 1998. After finishing her schooling, she joined the Sri Lanka Foundation Institute in 1999 to pursue a diploma in journalism and communication. She joined the Miranda House of the Delhi University in 2000 and obtained her BA degree in English literature in 2003. She also completed the military style 28-day Basic Course in Mountaineering and the 28-day Advanced Course in Mountaineering from the Himalayan Mountaineering Institute in 2003 and 2004 respectively. She obtained a post graduate diploma in 2007 in women's studies from the University of Colombo.

Kuru-Utumpala won a scholarship to study at the University of Sussex in UK and obtained her Master of Arts degree in gender studies in 2009. She performed research on women's rights while pursuing her higher studies and has also given motivational speeches aimed at empowering schoolgirls. Since 2003, she has been a key member of Sri Lanka's women's movement, as well as a part of Women and Media Collective. She served as a specialist in gender and sexuality at Care International Sri Lanka in April 2015. In 2016, she was appointed as the first goodwill ambassador for women's rights in Sri Lanka by the then Minister of Women's Affairs, Chandrani Bandara Jayasinghe.

In 2017, she wrote about her own personal experience of receiving a rare public platform to challenge gender stereotypes in an article titled "After Everest: can mountaineering tackle gender myths in Sri Lanka?"

As part of her feminist activism, together with two other colleagues, she recently co-created Delete Nothing - an online platform aimed at documenting technology-related violence in Sri Lanka.

Kuru-Utumpala teamed up with Johann Peries in 2011 and has worked with him in several successful expeditions, including summitting Adam's Peak, Island Peak in 2012, Mount Kilimanjaro in 2014, and her historic summit of Mount Everest in 2016. As an avid rock climber, she has also been rock climbing in Paarl Rocks in Stellenbosch, South Africa, Arneles Mendoza in Argentina, the Pyrenees in Spain, Saxony Switzerland in Germany, in addition to climbing at her local crag at ClimbLanka in Horana. In February 2019, Kuru-Utumpala and Peries officially signed as brand ambassadors of the Hatton National Bank.

== Everest expedition ==
From 2012 Kuru-Utumpala and Peries trained to summit Everest and participated in various recreational activities, such as swimming and climbing. In April 2016, the duo announced that they were on a mission to climb Mount Everest. They formed the Sri Lankan Everest Expedition campaign, 2016. The expedition, which cost around US$60,000, per person, was supported by the mountaineering company International Mountain Guides, who provided them with guide support, Sherpa support, logistics, meals, and accommodation during their expedition. Kuru-Utumpala and Peries were accompanied by Nepalese Sherpas Ang Karma (Kuru-Utumpala) and Ang Pasang (Peries).

Kuru-Utumpala reached the summit of Mount Everest successfully at 5:03 a.m. on 21 May 2016, while Peries was not able to complete the feat, as his oxygen tank failed 400 metres (1,300 ft) before the summit. Peries attained a height of 8,400 m (27,600 ft), which is beyond Camp IV (the final camp on the southern ascent route, on the South Col). Kuru-Utumpala went on to become the first Sri Lankan as well as first and only Sri Lankan woman to have reached the summit of Mount Everest. Kuru-Utumpala's summit also made Sri Lanka the fourth country in the world after Poland, Croatia and South Africa, from which a woman was the first person to reach the top of Mount Everest.

== Honors ==
Kuru-Utumpala obtained a special award from TV channel Ada Derana as a part of the Ada Derana Sri Lankan of the Year in 2016. She was also included in the BBC's list of 100 inspiring and influential women from around the world for 2017.

In March 2019, she was named as one of the most influential women, and among women change-makers in Sri Lanka, by the Parliament of Sri Lanka coinciding with International Women's Day.

In August 2019, she was one of the 66 recipients to receive national honors for 2019 from the Sri Lankan President Maithripala Sirisena.
