= Rajini Selvanayagam =

Sri Lankan traditional dancer

- Born: 1951/1952; Balangoda, Sabaragamuwa Province
- Died: 20 October 2023
- Occupations: dancer, dance teacher
- Organization: Chamara Kala Nikethanaya
- Known for: professional dancing
- Awards: Kalasuri (2005)

Kalasuri Rajini Selvanayagam (1951/1952 – 20 October 2023) was a veteran Sri Lankan traditional dancer. She was popularly dubbed as the Queen of Dance.

== Biography ==
She was born and raised in Balangoda.

== Career ==
She founded her own dance academy "Chamara Kala Nikethanaya" in 1975. She ran the Chamara Kala Nikethanaya which was solely intended at building a value-based society enhancing culture, traditions, customs through the art of dancing.

She was well known as a professional teacher of dancing during her illustrious career and she gave so much emphasis on the propagation and sustenance of unique forms of Sri Lankan dance art. She was conferred with prestigious Kalasuri during the 2005 Sri Lankan national honours. She was also conferred with Kala Keerthi and Vishwa Kala Keerthi titles during her career.

== Death ==
She died on 20 October 2023 at the age of 71.
