= Ivor Dennis =

Sri Lankan singer

- Born: 28 May 1932; Seeduwa, Western Province, Sri Lanka
- Died: 18 June 2018 (aged 86); Seeduwa, Sri Lanka
- Occupation: Playback singer
- Years active: 1952-2007

Kala Keerthi Pasquel Ge Don Augustine Ivor Dennis (Sinhala: අයිවෝ ඩෙනිස්) (28 May 1932 – 18 June 2018) was a popular Sri Lankan veteran playback singer who was also known as the former student of veteran icon Sunil Santha. He was well known for establishing long time relationship with legendary musician Sunil Santha, who is known as one of the icons and pioneers of Sinhala music. He had worked as a playback singer in many Sinhala films including Sri Lanka's first Sinhala film Rekava. He died on 18 June 2018 at his home in Seeduwa at the age of 86.

== Career ==
He pursued his career as a vocalist and took part in a song competition at Radio Ceylon in 1952. He sang veteran musician Sunil Santha's famous song Waren Heen Sare Redhee Walave during the competition and his performance was sooner recognised by Sunil Santha who also came forward to teach music for the latter. Ivor was pursued by Sunil Santha to croon a song on his own and Ivor recorded his first song Kurulu Paradiseye, which became an evergreen hit. He had also performed in many concerts in various countries including Japan, Indonesia, Italy, England and New Zealand.

He made his film debut as a singer which coincidentally came in Sri Lanka's first Sinhala film Rekava which was released in 1955. He was promoted as an A grade singer at Radio Ceylon in 1958. He notably won the Presidential Award for the Best Playback singer for the film Hima Kathara. He was honored with the prestigious Kala Keerthi award during the 2017 Sri Lankan national honours, for his outstanding contributions to the Sinhala cinema.

== Discography ==
- 1956 - Rekava
- 1960 - Sandesaya
- 2007 - Ai Oba Thaniwela
