= Gajaman =

- Sinhala: ගජමෑන්
- Directed by: Chanaka Perera
- Written by: Suneth Chitrananda; Gaminda Priyaviraj
- Based on: Gajaman cartoon by Camillus Perera
- Produced by: Isuru Silva; Isuru David
- Starring: Suneth Chitrananda; Gaminda Priyaviraj; Dasun Pathirana
- Cinematography: Shashimal Kularathna Dhanushka Lakmal Kannangara
- Edited by: Shashimal Kularathna
- Music by: Anushka Udana Liyanage (Wasthi Productions)
- Production company: Studio 101
- Release date: 20 January 2023
- Running time: 99 minutes
- Country: Sri Lanka
- Language: Sinhala
- Budget: LKR 75 million
- Box office: LKR 610 million

Gajaman (Sinhala: ගජමෑන්), sometimes referred to as Camillus' Gajaman 3D, is a 2023 Sri Lankan Sinhala 3D animation comedy film directed by Chanaka Perera and co-produced by John Fonseka and Chamika Jinadasa, Executive Produced by Isuru Silva and Isuru David for Studio 101. It is the first cinematic adaptation of the legendary comic characters created by the renowned cartoonist Camillus Perera. The motion capture cast includes Dasun Pathirana, Paboda Sandeepani and many newcomers. Film trailer was released at a press conference held at the National Film Corporation's Tharangani Cinema in April 2018. The movie was theatrically released on 17 January 2023 after having a limited release seven days earlier. Gajaman became the third highest grossed Sri Lankan movie of all time by reaching 610 Million LKR.

== Plot ==
Gajaman is a henchman of the local politician Magodisthuma. Gajaman's life is turned upside down when Magodisthuma asks him to pick up his daughter and her friend from the airport. Trouble is, Gajaman falls in love with Magodisthuma's daughter immediately as he sees her. Magodisthuma becomes furious when he finds out about this. Gajaman is exiled from his village and he tries to sneak back in with the help of his friend Amdan. The movie revolves around the classic Sri Lankan characters Gajaman and Magodisthuma created by Camillus Perera from newspaper cartoons in the 60s.

The film opens with Gajaman's house in the morning. In his bedroom, he wakes up and gets his foot stuck in a mousetrap. Afterwards he continues to live his normal routine and goes to Magodis's mansion where he informs Gajaman to pick up his daughter Padmavathi from the airport which results in humorous circumstances. Afterwards he returns some of his friends home to put posters of Magodis in the middle of the night which results in more humorous incidents such as putting posters on tombstones.

The next day Padmawathi leads the political assembly.

== Cast ==
- Gaminda Priyaviraj as Gajaman
- Suneth Chithrananda as Amda
- Rashi Prabodha
- Yureni Noshika as Sweety
- Dasun Pathirana
- Paboda Sandeepani as Padmawathi
- Sunil Perera as Minister Magodis
- Damitha Abeyratne as Minister wife
- Janindu Mahesh
- Chamara Sampath
- Pradeep Ramawickrama
- Kasuni Kavindi
- Sharadha Pathirage
- Parakrama Perera
- Anuradha Sigera

== Soundtrack ==
No.	Title	Lyrics	Singer(s)	Length
1.	"Bombe Motai"	Anushka Udana & Dinesh Gamage	Anushka Udana & Sunil Perera	2:50
2.	"Pichchamal Wassakin"	Tiron Perera	Ridma Weerawardena	3:41
3.	"Man Thaniwama"	Dinesh Gamage & Manuranga Wijesekara	Dinesh Gamage	3:22
