= Wimal Dissanayake =

Sri Lankan writer, academic and film critic (1939–2026)

- විමල් දිසානායක
- Born: 6 September 1939; Kurunegala, North Western Province, British Ceylon
- Died: 7 August 2026 (aged 86); Hawaii, U.S.
- Education: University of Peradeniya; University of Pennsylvania; University of Cambridge
- Occupations: Writer; academic; professor; literary critic; film critic
- Awards: The Sahithya Rathna Award (The Government of Sri Lanka); Honorary Doctor of Letters (University of Kelaniya); The Deshabandu Title (The Government of Sri Lanka); Asian Communication Award (Asian Media Information and Communication Centre)

Wimal Dissanayake (6 September 1939 – 7 August 2026) was a Sri Lankan creative writer, literary critic and leading scholar in Asian cinema and Asian communication theory. He was a Senior Fellow and an assistant director of the Institute of Culture and Communication at the East-West Center in Honolulu, Hawaii. He was the founding editor of the East-West Film Journal.

== Early life and education ==
Dissanayake was born on 6 September 1939, and came from Nikaveva, a village about 35 kilometres away from Kurunegala town. Both of his parents were school teachers. He attended high school at Trinity College, Kandy. He studied with an eminent dramatist, Ediriweera Sarachchandra. Dissanayake graduated from the University of Peradeniya with a B.A. degree upon graduating from the university, which merged while he was there with the University of Ceylon. He then earned an M.A. from the University of Pennsylvania and a Ph.D. from the University of Cambridge. He received Fulbright and Rockefeller Fellowships.

== Career ==
Dissanayake was a research associate at the East-West Communication Institute and then a senior fellow and an assistant director of the Institute of Culture and Communication at the East-West Center in Honolulu, Hawaii. He later became Wei Lun Visiting Professor at the Chinese University of Hong Kong and a professor of cultural studies at the University of Hong Kong. He returned to Hawaii and served as the director of the International Cultural Studies Graduate Certificate Program jointly sponsored by the East-West Center and the University of Hawaii from 2008 to 2011.

He is considered as an early pioneer in the field of Asian communication theory. He criticised the wholesale adoption of Western communication theories and research methods in the Asian region. He studied Asian classical teachings, examined Asian rituals, beliefs, and norms, and developed Asian communication theories. He is also considered as a progressive public intellectual who early on introduced postmodernism to Sinhalese readers. He began publishing columns on postmodern thought in Sinhalese newspapers in the 1990s.

Dissanayake's scholarly books in English were published by Cambridge University Press, Oxford University Press, Duke University Press, Indiana University Press, University of Minnesota Press, Routledge, and Penguin Books. Wong Kar-wai’s Ashes of Time (2003), Raj Kapoor's Films: Harmony of Discourses (1988), Sinhala Novel and the Public Sphere (2009), Self and Colonial Desire: Travel Writings of V. S. Naipaul (1993) and Sholay, A Cultural Reading (1992) are regarded as some of his most notable works.

In 2000, Dissanayake co-authored a book titled, Profiling Sri Lankan Cinema, with Ashley Ratnavibhushana. The book focused on the growth trajectory of the Sri Lankan cinema. In 2004, Dissanayake also published Indian Popular Cinema: A Narrative of Cultural Change with K. Moti Goulsing based on their analysis of the nine decades of Indian cinema, which had seen its own fair share of lows and highs. The book examined the impact of Indian popular cinema on Indians on the continent and in the diaspora and discussed how Indian cinema captured international attention beyond the Indian audience. The book highlighted six major influences that have shaped Indian popular cinema.

Dissanayake was the Editor-in-Chief of the East-West Film Journal, published by the Institute of Culture and Communication at the East-West Center, from 1986 to 1994. He also maintained a very close association with the Hawaii International Film Festival since its inception in 1981, and the longstanding association was ended in 1995 after 14 years. More recently, he explored Asian television drama as “a way of gaining entry into the field of Asian communication theory” especially for the study of comparative aesthetics and emotional dynamics.

== Death ==
Dissanayake died in Hawaii on 7 August 2026, at the age of 86.

== Awards ==
Dissanayake received the Sahithya Rathna Award from the Government of Sri Lanka at the 2012 State Literary Festival. He was conferred with an Honorary Doctor of Letters from the University of Kelaniya. He was conferred with the prestigious Deshabandu title during the 2019 Sri Lankan national honours.

On 4 December 2021, Dissanayake was conferred with the Asian Communication Award for Disruptive Inquiry by the Asian Media Information and Communication Centre (AMIC). He received the award in the virtual edition of the 28th AMIC Annual Conference, where the award winners were officially announced.

== Publications ==
- Dissanayake, W. (Ed.). (1988). Cinema and cultural identity: Reflections on films from Japan, India, and China. University Press of America.
- Dissanayake, W. (Ed.). (1993). Melodrama and Asian cinema. Cambridge University Press.
- Dissanayake, W. (Ed.). (1994). Colonialism and nationalism in Asian cinema. Indiana University Press.
- Dissanayake, W. (Ed.). (1996). Narratives of agency: Self-making in China, India, and Japan. University of Minnesota Press.
- Dissanayake, W. (Ed.). (2022). Communication theory: The Asian perspective (2nd ed.). Asian Media Information and Communication Center.
- Dissanayake, W., & Said, A. R. b M. (Eds.). (1983). Communications research and cultural values. Asian Mass Communication Research and Information Center.
- Ames, R. T., & Dissanayake, W. (Eds.). (1996). Self and deception: A cross-cultural philosophical enquiry. State University of New York Press.
- Ames, R. T., Dissanayake, W., & Kasulis, T. P. (Eds.). (1994). Self as person in Asian theory and practice. State University of New York Press.
- Ames, R. T., Kasulis, T. P., & Dissanayake, W. (Eds.). (1998). Self as image in Asian theory and practice. State University of New York Press.
- Arno, A., & Dissanayake, W. (Eds.). (1984). The news media in national and international conflict. Westview Press.
- Gokulsing, M. K., & Dissanayake, W. (Eds.). (2013). Routledge handbook of Indian cinema. Routledge.
- Guneratne, A. R., & Dissanayake, W. (Eds.). (2003). Rethinking third cinema. Routledge.
- Kasulis, T. P., Ames, R. T., & Dissanayake, W. (Eds.). (1993). Self as body in Asian theory and practice. State University of New York Press.
- Wang, G., & Dissanayake, W. (Eds.). (1984). Continuity and change in communication systems: An Asian perspective. Ablex.
- Wilson, R., & Dissanayake, W. (Eds.). (1996). Global/local: Cultural production and the transnational imaginary. Duke University Press.
