= Siva Sivananthan =

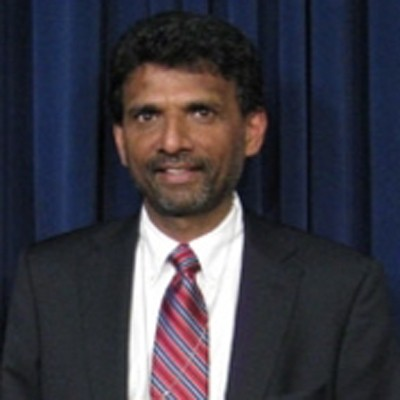
- Education: Saraswathi Maha Vidyalayam; Drieberg College; Jaffna Hindu College; University of Peradeniya; University of Illinois at Chicago
- Occupation: Academic

Sivalingam Sivananthan is an American academic, scientist, businessman and Director of the Microphysics Laboratory at the University of Illinois at Chicago.

== Early life and family ==
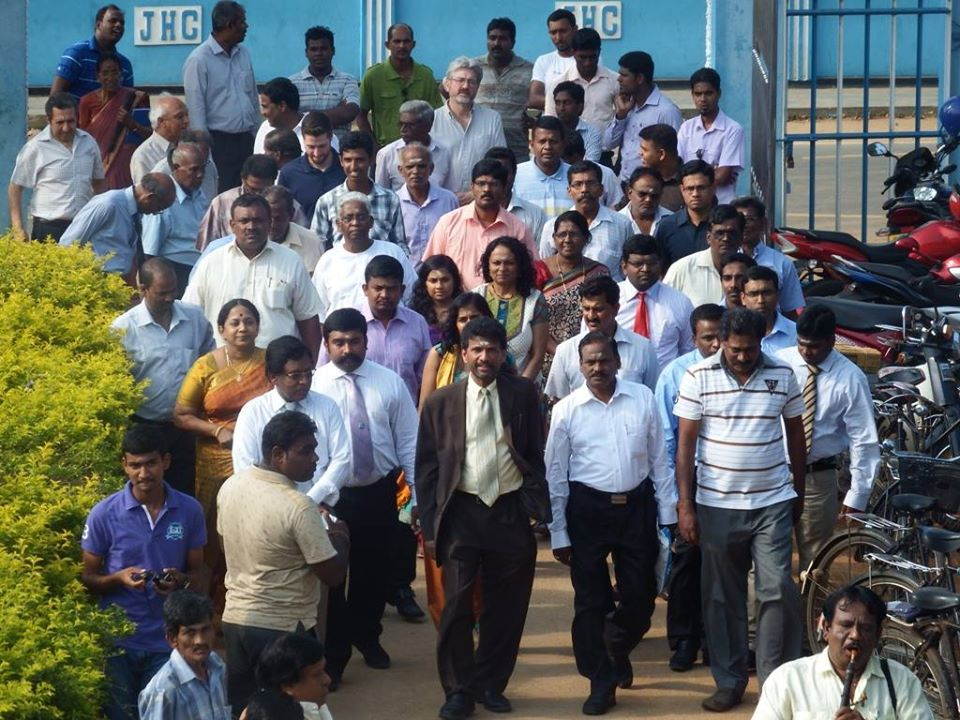
Professor Sivananthan is escorted by E. Saravanapavan, Member of Parliament(Jaffna District), Principal & Staff of Jaffna Hindu College and well-wishers to deliver a guest lecture at the 73rd Commemoration Day and Achievers' Special Lecture Event of the Rotary Club of Jaffna, which was held at Jaffna Hindu College on 15 April 2014.

Sivananthan was born in Madduvil South near Chavakachcheri in northern Ceylon. His father was a Tamil scholar from Valvettithurai and his mother was teacher of religion and science. He was educated at Saraswathi Maha Vidyalayam, Drieberg College and Jaffna Hindu College (1968–75). After school he joined the University of Peradeniya's Science Faculty in 1976, graduating in 1980 with a BS degree in physics.

== Career ==
After graduating Sivananthan lectured at Eastern University, Sri Lanka before joining the University of Illinois at Chicago in 1982 for post-graduate study. He obtained MSc (1985) and PhD (1988) degrees from the university. He is currently a Distinguished Professor and Director of the Microphysics Laboratory at the university's Department of Physics.

Sivananthan entered business in 1998 when he founded EPIR Technologies Inc. Sivananthan is also founder and CEO of Sivananthan Laboratories Inc. based in Bolingbrook, Illinois.

In May 2013 Sivananthan was awarded the "Champion of Change" (Immigrant Entrepreneurs and Innovators category) by the White House. He was awarded the Vidya Nidhi title in the 2017 Sri Lankan national honours. In 2010 he was elected a Fellow of the American Physical Society for "seminal contributions to the growth technology of II-VI photovoltaic materials.".
