= Somalatha Subasinghe =

Sri Lankan actress

Somalatha Subasinghe සෝමලතා සුබසිංහ
- Born: 2 July 1936; Gampaha, Sri Lanka
- Died: 30 May 2015 (aged 78); Colombo, Sri Lanka
- Education: University of Peradeniya
- Occupations: Actress; Playwright; Stage director; Teacher
- Spouse: Lionel Fernando
- Children: Kaushalya Fernando, Shyamalika Nanayakkara
- Relatives: D. W. Subasinghe (brother)
- Awards: Kala Suri; Kala Keerthi

Kala Suri Somalatha Subasinghe (2 July 1936 – 30 May 2015 as සෝමලතා සුබසිංහ) was a Sri Lankan actress, playwright, theatre director and educator from Sri Lanka. She received both the Kala Suri and the Kala Keerthi in recognition of her contribution to Sri Lankan theatre.

== Biography ==
=== Early life and education ===
Somalatha Subasinghe was born in Gampaha on 2 July 1936. Her father was a principal and her mother was a teacher. She attended Musaeus College and later Buddhist Ladies College, Colombo. After successfully life

Subasinghe joined the Education Department of Sri Lanka in 1962 as a graduate teacher. She taught drama at Nalanda College, Colombo in the mid-1970s.

=== Family ===
In 1962, Somalatha was married to Lionel Fernando, who was Sri Lanka's ambassador to Malaysia, the Netherlands and France. They have two children, Kaushalya Fernando, who is married to Dr. Chandana Aluthge, and Shyamalika Nanayakkara.

She died on 30 May 2015 in Colombo, Sri Lanka.

== Career ==
=== Involvement in theatre ===
Having shown an interest in art and music from a young age, Subasinghe's stage career took off while she was studying at the University of Peradeniya. Her first role, at age 24, was that of an old woman, the only female character in the original cast of Ediriweera Sarachchandra's play Raththaran. Sarachchandra encouraged her to consider a career in acting and became a lifelong influence on her.

She founded the Lanka Children's and Youth Theatre Foundation (LCYTF) (also known as Play House - Kotte) in 1981.

Somalatha Subasinghe's involvement in Sri Lankan theatre included her participation as an actress and later, as a scriptwriter and director of her own productions. When she appeared as Sara in Mudu Puththu by Gunasena Galappaththi she performed her own songs, and sang with rhythm and melody. The play, an adaptation of Garcia Lorca's Yerma, included a well known song that is now sung by children.

=== Films ===
Somalatha Subasinghe also acted in films including Viragaya, Madol Duwa, Mahagedera, Thilaka Saha Thilaka, Me Mage Sandai, Sudu Kaluwara and Siribo Aiya.

=== Television dramas ===
Somalatha Subasinghe acted in several television dramas including Ella Langa Walawwa, Gamperaliya and Suba Anagathayak.

== Awards and honours ==
Somalatha Subasinghe won Best Director and Best Translated Production awards for the stage play Yadam and the Best Director award for the play Antigone, at State Drama Festivals. She has been recognised with the national Kala Suri award. She was given the Kala Keerthi awards for her contribution to theatre on 15 November 2005.

== Filmography ==
=== As a film actress ===
| Year | Film | Role | Ref. |
|---|---|---|---|
| 1973 | Dahakin Ekek | Sirisena's mother | |
| 1976 | Madol Duwa | Upali's stepmother | |
| 1976 | Thilaka saha Thilakaa | Thilake's mother | |
| 1979 | Wasanthaye Dawasak | Sudu Menike | |
| 1980 | Siribo Ayya | Biso's mother | |
| 1982 | Maha Gedara | Malwinna mother | |
| 1983 | Muhudu Lihini | | |
| 1984 | Arunata Pera | Banda's sister | |
| 1984 | Parasathuro | Ran Ethana | |
| 1985 | Rejina | | |
| 1987 | Viragaya | Veda Hamine | |
| 1993 | Guru Gedara | Ariya's mother | |
| 2003 | Sudu Kaluwara | Appuhamy's mother | |

=== As a stage actress ===
- Role in Raththarang by Ediriweera Sarachchandra
- Role in Elowa Gihin Melowa Awa by Ediriweera Sarachchandra
- Role of Sara in Mudu Puththu (adaptation of Garcia Lorca’s Yerma) by Gunasena Galappaththi
- Role of Jessica in Liya Thambara by Ranjith Dharmakeerthi
- Role in Diriya Mawa saha Age Daruwo (Sinhalese translation of Mother Courage) by Henry Jayasena
- Role of Ranavishaya in Cherry Uyana by Ranjith Dharmakeerthi
- Role in Hiru Nethi Lowa by Ranjith Dharmakeerthi
- Role of Kumari in Wes Muhunu by Dhamma Jagoda
- Role in Dayananda Gunawardena’s Nari Bena

=== As playwright/director ===
- 1982 Vikurthi (Distortion) an original play focusing on the problems of the education system of Sri Lanka.
- 1985 Para Haraha (Across the Road) an original play based on the conflict between traffic and pedestrians.
- 1986 Sanda Kinduru (Buddhist theme) written by Gunasena Galappatthi, staged in collaboration with Sujatha Vidyalaya, subsequently for television - drama.
- 1990 Mudu Putthu (Yerma by Garcia Lorca) adaptation by Gunasena Galappatty
- 1990 Pawara Nuwarak (city of Fame) Adaptation of a Sinhala classical poem as a contemporary social comment
- 1991 Opera Wanyosi of Wole Soyinka (Adaptation as a trilingual Play-English/Sinhala/Tamil in collaboration with Dept. of English, University of Colombo.
- 1992 The Trial of Dedan Kimathi by Nugugi Wa Thionogo and Micere Gitahe Mugo Production in English in collaboration with the British Council, Colombo.
- 1992 Yadam (Chains) Sinhala Translation of The Trial of Dedan Kimathi by Nugugi Wa Thionogo.
- 1993 Antigone by Sophoclese Sinhala Production; Translated from English translation by E. F. Watling
- 1998 Mavakage Sangramaya Sinhala Translation of Mother Courage and Her Children by Bertolt Brecht, in collaboration with German Cultural Centre to commemorate 100th birth anniversary of Bertolt Brecht.

=== Plays for children ===
- 1979 Punchi Apata dan Therei (We Know It Now)
- 1979 Thoppi Welenda (Hat Seller)
- 1981 Gamarala Divya Loketa (Gamarala Going to Heaven)
- 1981 Rathmalee (adaptation of Red Riding Hood)
- 1988 Ottooi (Challenge)
- 1995 Hima Kumariya (adaptation of Snow White and the Seven Dwarfs)
- 2003 Walas Pawula (adaptation of Goldilocks and Three Bears)
