= Edwin Ariyadasa =

Sri Lankan journalist (1922–2021)

- එඩ්වින් ආරියදාස
- Born: Wijetunga Karunaratne Edwin Ariyadasa; 3 December 1922; Unawatuna, British Ceylon
- Died: 22 January 2021 (aged 98); Colombo, Sri Lanka
- Education: Unawatuna Buddhist Mixed School; Mahinda College, Galle; University of Ceylon
- Website: edwinariyadasa.org

Kala Keerthi Wijetunga Karunaratne Edwin Ariyadasa (3 December 1922 – 22 January 2021: Sinhala: එඩ්වින් ආරියදාස), popularly known as Edwin Ariyadasa, was a Sri Lankan Sinhalese journalist. He was a well known newspaper editor, author and a media consultant. Considered as an icon in Sri Lankan media, he was a pioneer in bilingual communication and wrote about Sinhala cinema in English in Sri Lanka. He was also the pioneer teacher who brought the subject of communication closer to general public.

== Early life and education ==
Ariyadasa was born on 3 December 1922 in Unawatuna, Galle, Sri Lanka as the youngest of the family. His father V. K. Abraham Appuhamy was a farmer and mother Sisiliana Hamine was a housewife. He had three elder brothers and two elder sisters. Although named by his father, his older sister, Dayawathi, changed his name from Appuhamy to Ariyadasa. He had his primary education at Buddhist Mixed School in Unawatuna and received his secondary education at Mahinda College, Galle.

He entered the University of Ceylon in 1945 and passed out with a bachelor's degree in Sinhala and English languages. He taught at Mahinda College for some time and then he returned to Colombo to work as the secretary of the General Insurance Company.

== Journalist career ==
Before starting his media career, he worked as a teacher in Mahinda College himself and later in a high-paying job at the then General Insurance Company. However, he had already written various articles for newspapers during this period. He was writing for the Silumina newspaper at the age of twelve at the time when it was known as the Shatha Dahaye Vishvidyalaya. He joins the Daily News to write in English as a professional journalist and joins Dinamina under the guidance of Piyasena Nissanka.

On 3 March 1949, he joined Lake House. At the Lake House, he was a member of the Editorial Staff of most of the Lake House Publications. He was on the Editorial Staff of Divaina, Daily News, Sunday Observer, Silumina, Janatha and was the Editor-in-Chief of "Navanugaya". Instead of translating English editorials into Sinhala, Piyasena Nissanka pioneered writing Sinhala editorials in Sinhala along with the young Ariyadasa. He wrote the first article on cinema on 11 March 1949. He wrote about the film Hamlet under the title 'Sinhala Chithrapati Karayinta Adarsha Padamak ('An Exemplary Lesson for Sinhala Filmmakers'). In 1950, he also wrote the column 'Sinhalese Films' for the Sunday Observer about Sinhala films of that year. This is the first annual review of Sinhala films in Sri Lanka written in English.

He initiated the study of Mass Communication at the higher education subject in Sri Lanka. In 1969, he starting a course at Dehiwala Junior Technical College. He formulated the first syllabus to teach mass communications at the University of Kelaniya. Also, he was associated with the introduction of media studies at the Open University of Sri Lanka. He was highly influential in the inauguration of the Diploma of Mass Communications at the University of Colombo. Prof. Wimal Dissanayake and Edwin Ariyadasa later pioneered the subject of Mass Communication at the University of Kelaniya. Meanwhile, he was a member of the Jury at the Sarasaviya Awards in 1995 and Chairman of the Jury at the Sarasaviya Awards in 2002. He was also the recipient of the Ranapala Bodhinagoda Memorial Literary Award for his contribution to film literature at the 2007 Sarasaviya Awards.

Edwin Ariyadasa is appraised for introducing new Sinhala terms for English terms such as Antarjalaya' (Internet), 'Madya Rupa' (media images) and 'Sajivikaranaya' (Animation).

== Other work ==
- First Director Promotion of the Central Environment Authority.
- Consultant to the Arthur C. Clarke Institute for Modern Technologies.
- Media consultant to the Ministry of Information and Broadcasting.
- Consultant to the Lake House.
- Consultant to the Police Commission of Sri Lanka.
- Consultant (Publicity and Promotion) to the Mahaweli Centre.
- Chairman of the committee to formulate Mass Media Policy for Sri Lanka.

== Honours and awards ==
=== Honours ===
- Kala Keerthi – Presented by the Sri Lankan Government on 22 May 1992

=== Awards ===
- "Golden Lion Peace Award" for Commitment to Peace and Harmony – Presented by Sōka Gakkai-Singapore Branch 2005
- Rotaract Award for the Outstanding Service to the Community presented by ROTARACT 13 March 2001
- Unda Homage Award for the service to the Sri Lankan Media given at UNDA ABHINANDANA 1996
- Golden Felicitation Award for the Best Journalist (Sinhala) 1994 presented by National Communicators Association Sri Lanka
- Sanjananee Media Award for the service to the Sri Lankan Media from University of Kelaniya 2006
- Kala Lanka Award for the service to the Sinhala Cinema presented by Kala Lanka Padanama 2001-01-21
- Ranapala Bodhinagoda Memorial Award for the service to Sinhala Cinema from Sarasaviya Film Festival 2005
- OCIC Cyrill B Perera Memorial Award for the service to Sinhala Cinema 2004
- Arya Keerthi Sri Janatha Probodhanee – Presented by The Secretariat to rid undue privileges and discriminations and to monitor human rights and fundamental rights on 1 January 2003
- Rohana Pradeepa – Presented by University of Ruhuna on 11 September 2003
- Vishwa Madya Bahusruta – Presented by Peace Energy Lamp Organization on 17 January 2005
- Minimuthu- presented by Sri Lanka Communicators Association on 18 September 2007
- Adyapanasuree, Madya keerthi, Mnawa hiawadi – Presented by Society for National Unity on 12 November 2007

== Publications ==
=== Edited ===
- Buddha's Life in Murals
- Parents and Children: Key to Happiness
- Vision of the Buddha
- The new Illustrated edition of Sir Edwin Arnold's "Light of Asia"
- Nature of Life and Death
- Morals of the Young
- The Greatest Man who ever Lived: The Supreme Buddha
- Life of Ven Ananda
- Translation into English Maha Satipattana Sutta
- English Translation of Maha Mangala Sutta
- Word of the Buddha- Jointly with Ven. Weragoda Sarada, Kondanna

=== Translations ===
- Amarica Ithihasaye Jiwmana Wartha – Sinhala Translation of "Living Documents of American History" by Prof. Henry Steele Commager*Jayagrahanayaka Piyasatahan – Sinhala Translation of Jimmy Carter's Autobiography – "Why not the Best?"
- Hudakala Kalakaru – Sinhala Translation of "The Lonely Artist" – a study of Film Director Lester James Peiris by Phillip Cooray.
- Niwaradiwa Sithime Maga – Sinhala Translation of "How to Think Clearly" By Lionel Ruby.
- Americanu Viplawaye Arutha – Sinhala Translation of "The Meaning of the American Revolution" by DAN LACY
- Weera Charitha – Sinhala Translation of Profiles in Courage by President John F. Kennedy
- Everest Dinapotha – Sinhala Translation of "Everest Diary" by John McCallum
- Pahasuwen Sitin: Ma Yahaluwanta Kiyana Kathandara – Sinhala Translation of "At Ease: Stories I Tell my Friends" by Dwight Eisenhower
- Three Characters – English Translation of K. Jayatillake's "Charita Thunak"
- 2001 Lokaya – Sinhala Translation of "The World in 2001" by H.D.Halacy (Translated jointly, Mr. Benedict Dodampegama)
- Oxford picture Dictionary – English – Sinhala
- Saradharma Adyapanaya – Sinhala Translation of SOKA Education by Dr. Daisaku Ikeda
