= Sri Lankabhimanya =

One of the highest national awards of Sri Lanka

Sri Lankabhimanya ශ්‍රී ලංකාභිමාන්‍ය சிறீ லங்காபிமான்ய

Awarded by The Government of Sri Lanka
- Type: Title of honor/Order of merit
- Established: 1981
- Eligibility: Sri Lankan citizens
- Criteria: Exceptional and distinguished service to the nation
- Status: Currently constituted

Statistics
- First induction: 1986
- Last induction: 2023
- Total inductees: 9

Precedence
- Next (higher): None
- Next (lower): Deshamanya
- Equivalent: National Hero of Sri Lanka
- Ribbon of the medal

Sri Lankabhimanya (Sinhala: ශ්‍රී ලංකාභිමාන්‍ය, romanized: Śrī Laṅkābhimānya; Tamil: சிறீ லங்காபிமான்ய, romanized: Ciṟī Laṅkāpimāṉya; The Pride of Sri Lanka) is the highest national honour of Sri Lanka, which is awarded by the President of Sri Lanka on behalf of the government, equivalent to the National Hero of Sri Lanka. It is the country's highest civil honour and is conferred upon "those who have rendered exceptionally outstanding and most distinguished service to the nation".

The honour can only be held by five living Sri Lankans at any given time, and may also be conferred posthumously. Karu Jayasuriya is the only living recipient of the award as of 2025. Since its initiation in 1986, the award has only been conferred to nine individuals.

The honour is conventionally used as a title or prefix to the name of the person who receives the award.

== Insignia ==
The insignia consists of a badge circular with blooming lotus in the centre and Sri Lankabhimanya written in Sinahala and Tamil around it. The badge is suspended from the neck by a ribbon with a blue centre and two marron line between separated by yellow boarders. A shoulder sash of the same colour is worn from the left shoulder to the right hip. A Sanasa (certificate) signed by the President of Sri Lanka is presented to the recipient.

== Recipients ==
Key
Living recipient	Posthumous recipient

List of Sri Lankabhimanya award recipients
#	Year	Recipient	Field	Conferred by
1	1986	Ranasinghe Premadasa (1924–1993)	Government	J. R. Jayewardene
2	1993	Dingiri Banda Wijetunga (1916–2008)	Government	Ranasinghe Premadasa
3	2005	Arthur C. Clarke (1917–2008)	Science	Chandrika Kumaratunga
4	2005	Lakshman Kadirgamar (1932–2005)	Government	Chandrika Kumaratunga
5	2007	A. T. Ariyaratne (1931–2024)	Civil service	Mahinda Rajapaksa
6	2007	Lester James Peries (1919–2018)	Cinema	Mahinda Rajapaksa
7	2007	Christopher Weeramantry (1926–2017)	Law	Mahinda Rajapaksa
8	2017	W. D. Amaradeva (1927–2016)	Music	Maithripala Sirisena
9	2023	Karu Jayasuriya (born 1940)	Government	Ranil Wickremesinghe
