= Johann Peries =

Sri Lankan mountaineer and hair designer

Personal information
- Nationality: Sri Lankan
- Born: Johann Peries
- Occupations: Hair stylist, Mountaineer

Climbing career
- Major ascents: First Sri Lankan man and second Sri Lankan to Summit Mount Everest

Johann Peries, is a Sri Lankan adventurer, mountaineer, and hair stylist. He formed a collaboration with Jayanthi Kuru-Utumpala for several expeditions of Mount Everest. In April 2016, the two became the first Sri Lankans to attempt to summit Everest. His attempt was unsuccessful, but Kuru-Utumpala managed to reach the summit. On 22 May 2018, climbing with his own support team, he became the first Sri Lankan man to summit Everest.

== Career ==
Johann Peries pursued his early career as an artist and a singer, became a hair stylist in 1993, and soon became one of the most sought after in the country. He owns and runs three salons, two of which are in Colombo and the other in London.

As a youth, Peries developed an interest in rock climbing and, together with his father, climbed the Knuckles Mountain Range on several occasions. His first exploration outside Sri Lanka was on the Thai-Burmese border in 2005. He also reached the Everest Base Camp in 2010. He teamed up with Jayanthi Kuru-Utumpala in 2011 and has since worked together with her on several successful expeditions, including the summits of Adam's Peak and Island Peak in 2012, the summit of Mount Kilimanjaro in 2014, and the Mount Everest expedition of 2016. Peries has also climbed Mount Kalapattar in Nepal and Mount Kinabalu in Malaysia.

== Climbing expeditions ==
=== First attempt ===
Peries, along with Kuru-Utumpala, prepared for their Everest attempt from 2014 and were involved in various training activities such as swimming and climbing. In April 2016, the duo announced their ambition to climb Mount Everest and jointly formed the Sri Lankan Everest Expedition campaign, 2016. The expedition, which cost around US$136,000 was supported by the mountaineering company International Mountain Guides, which provided them with guide support, Sherpa support, logistical support, meals, and accommodation during their expedition. Kuru-Utumpala and Peries were accompanied by Nepalese Sherpas Ang Karma (Kuru-Utumpala) and Ang Pasang (Peries). Their expedition marked the first attempt by Sri Lankan natives to summit the peak.

Peries was not able to complete the climb as his oxygen tank failed 400 m (1,300 ft) before he reached the summit, but his partner Kuru-Utumpala did manage to reach the summit of Mount Everest successfully at 5:03 AM on 21 May 2016. This gave her the distinction of becoming the first Sri Lankan person to summit Mount Everest. Peries attained a height of 8,400 m (27,600 ft), which is beyond Camp IV (the final camp on the southern ascent route, on the South Col).

=== Second attempt ===
Peries made a second attempt to summit Mount Everest, this time without collaborating with Kuru-Utumpala. He started his journey on 4 April 2018, embarking on a 48-day expedition. He also initiated a campaign called "Climb Everest with Johann" through an online campaign, and several volunteers joined in the efforts to sponsor the costs of his expedition. The campaign managed to collect US$60,000 from the volunteers and was spent on Peries' second attempt.

Peries reached the summit of Mount Everest on 22 May 2018 at around 5:55 AM, becoming only the second Sri Lankan to summit the peak. He was supported by a team of 13 members, including 8 Nepalese Sherpas, 2 Americans, 1 South African, and 1 Canadian.

=== Seven Summits Challenge ===
Following his Everest achievement, Peries set his sights on the Seven Summits. He successfully summited Mount Kilimanjaro (Africa), Mount Elbrus (Europe), and Mount Kosciuszko (Australia). In May 2023, he attempted to climb Denali (North America) but was unable to reach the summit due to severe weather conditions. Undeterred, Peries continued his quest and, on January 27, 2025, became the first Sri Lankan to summit Mount Vinson, Antarctica’s highest peak at 4,892 meters.

On February 18, 2025, Peries climbed Mount Aconcagua (South America), reaching 200 meters short of the summit due to the turnaround time—a critical safety decision in mountaineering to ensure a safe descent before conditions become too dangerous.

On 17 June 2026, Peries successfully summited Denali, the highest mountain peak in North America, as part of the Seven Summits challenge. This marked his sixth of the seven continental peaks, leaving only Aconcagua in Argentina to complete the challenge.
