= Dayantha Wijeyesekera =

Sri Lankan academic and civil engineer (born 1942)

Dayantha Sepala Wijeyesekera (born September 1942) is a Sri Lankan academic and civil engineer. He was the first vice chancellor of Open University of Sri Lanka in 1983. He later served as Chairman, Tertiary and Vocational Education Commission (TVEC) in the Ministry of Youth Affairs and Skills Development of Sri Lanka. He was also the vice chancellor of University of Moratuwa from 1999 to 2005.

In 2011, he was named chancellor of the University of Vocational Technology (UNIVOTEC). In 2011, his paper titled "Post Tsunami infrastructure rehabilitation in Sri Lanka" was runner-up at a Competition on Papers at the Asia Pacific Convention of the Institution of Civil Engineers-ICE (London) in Kuala Lumpur, Malaysia.
