= Camillus Perera =

Sri Lankan cartoonist (1939–2023)

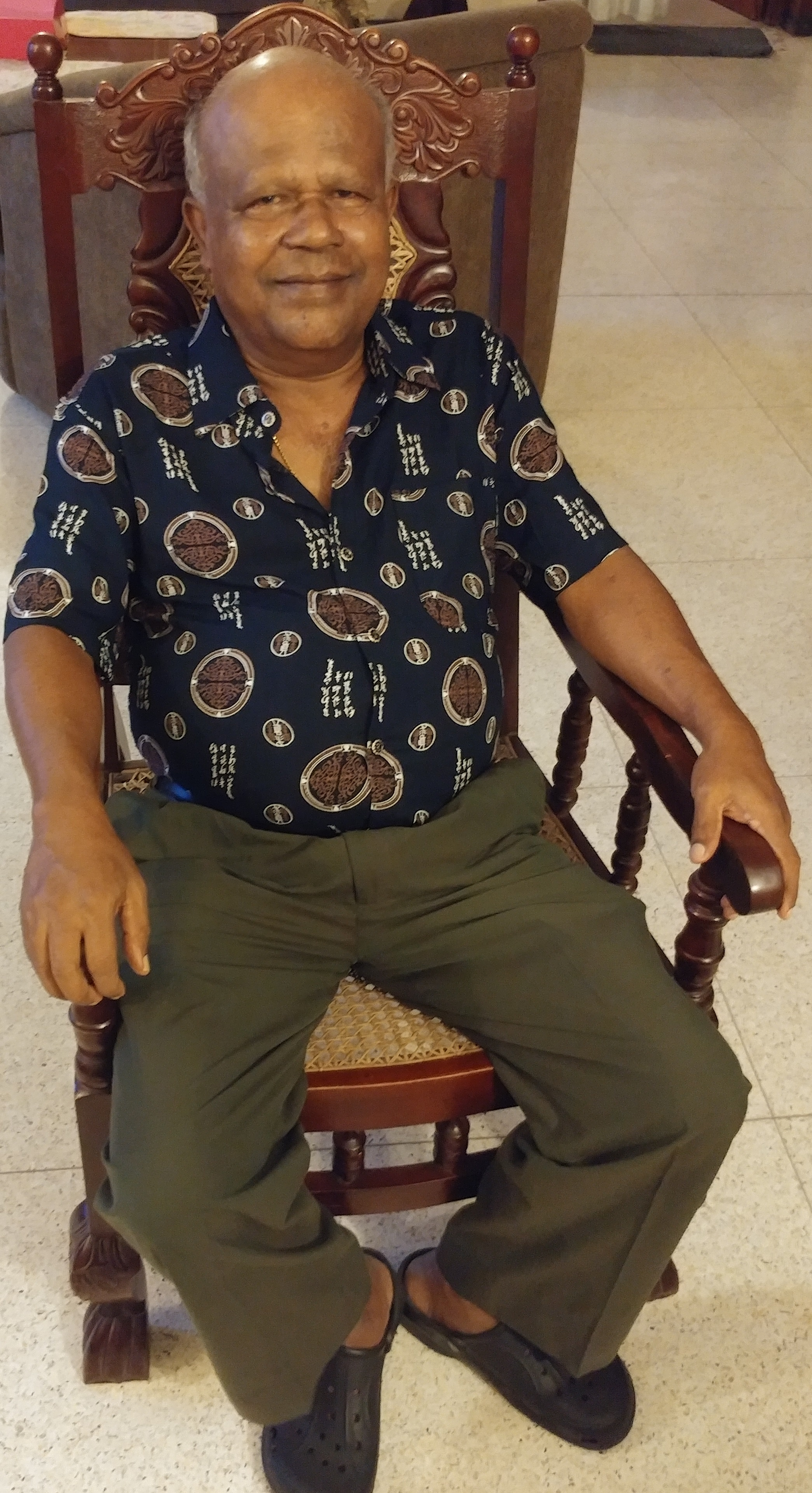
- Born: Camillus Perera; 1 December 1939 Negombo, British Ceylon
- Died: 17 December 2023 (aged 84)
- Areas: Writer, Editor, Publisher, Producer
- Notable works: Gajaman; Don Sethan; Siribiris; Dekkoth Pathmawathi

Kala Keerthi Camillus Perera (1 December 1939 – 17 December 2023) was a Sri Lankan cartoonist. His cartoon characters like Gajaman and Siribiris have been published in various Sinhala newspapers ranging from the Sunday Observer to Sivdesa. Perera was invited to join the advisory board of John Lent's Cartoon Journal in 2002.

== Life and career ==
=== Early life ===
Perera was born in Negombo and was the eldest son in a family of four. He was educated at the Roman Catholic Sinhala School, Maris Stella and St. Mary's College, Negombo. Perera first dabbled in art in the lower grades. He also briefly pursued a career as a sportsman in his teens leading the Jupiter Football Association in Negombo.

=== Cartoonist ===
Perera began work as a cartoonist in 1966 developing characters for the Observer and "Dekkoth Pathmawathi" for Lake House's film magazine. In 1972, he created Gajaman, his most popular character which eventually became a cult classic in Sri Lanka. Gajaman first appeared on Sathuta, a Lake House comic art publication and from 1975 to 1984 occupied a spot on the comic publication Sittara. He eventually transformed himself into an household name in Sri Lanka among the general audience through the creation of cartoon characters such as Gajaman and Siribiris.

Perera's characters

In April 1984, Perera produced a magazine devoted to his work titled Camillusge Gajaman. Its success, with over 200,000 copies sold, prompted the followups Camillusge Samayan in December and Camillusge Gajaman #2 the next year. Both sold between 200,000–300,000 copies and resulted in the formation of Camillus Publications. Perera cited copyright issues as a primary reason for the creation of his new company. He subsequently registered his 15 characters with the Department of Registry and Patents.

Camillusge Gajaman Samaga Sathsiri (later shortened to Sathsiri) released in 1986 was the first comic magazine by Camillus Publications and immediately sold over 150,000 copies eventually achieving a circulation of 200,000. Their second magazine Camillusge Don Sethan Samaga Rasika (shortened to Rasika) followed the misadventures of Don Sethan, Perera's oldest creation. Don Sethan first appeared in the daily Janath on 1 May 1966.

In the 1990s, Perera worked on several periodicals including a weekly comic magazine.

=== Death ===
Perera died on 17 December 2023, at the age of 84.

=== Legacy ===
Several exhibitions of Perera's work have been held. In 2002 Perera celebrated Gajaman's 36th birthday at BMICH, Colombo 7 with chief guest Power and Energy Minister Karu Jayasuriya. In 2004 the Alliance Française de Kandy sponsored an exhibition which was opened by Professor Kapila Goonasekere, Vice Chancellor of the University of Peradeniya. An animated film based on the comic strip Gajaman was produced by Studio 101 and released on 27 January 2023.
