= Sumana Jayatillake =

Sri Lankan broadcaster

- Born: April 23, 1937 (age 88)
- Occupation: broadcaster
- Spouse: K. Jayatillake

Kala Keerthi Sumana Jayatillake (born April 23, 1937) is a popular Sinhala broadcaster who produced and hosted children's programmes at SLBC, including Handa Mama. She is married to K. Jayatillake.
