= Gamini Haththotuwegama =

Dr. Gamini Haththotuwegama ගාමිණී හත්තොටුවේගම
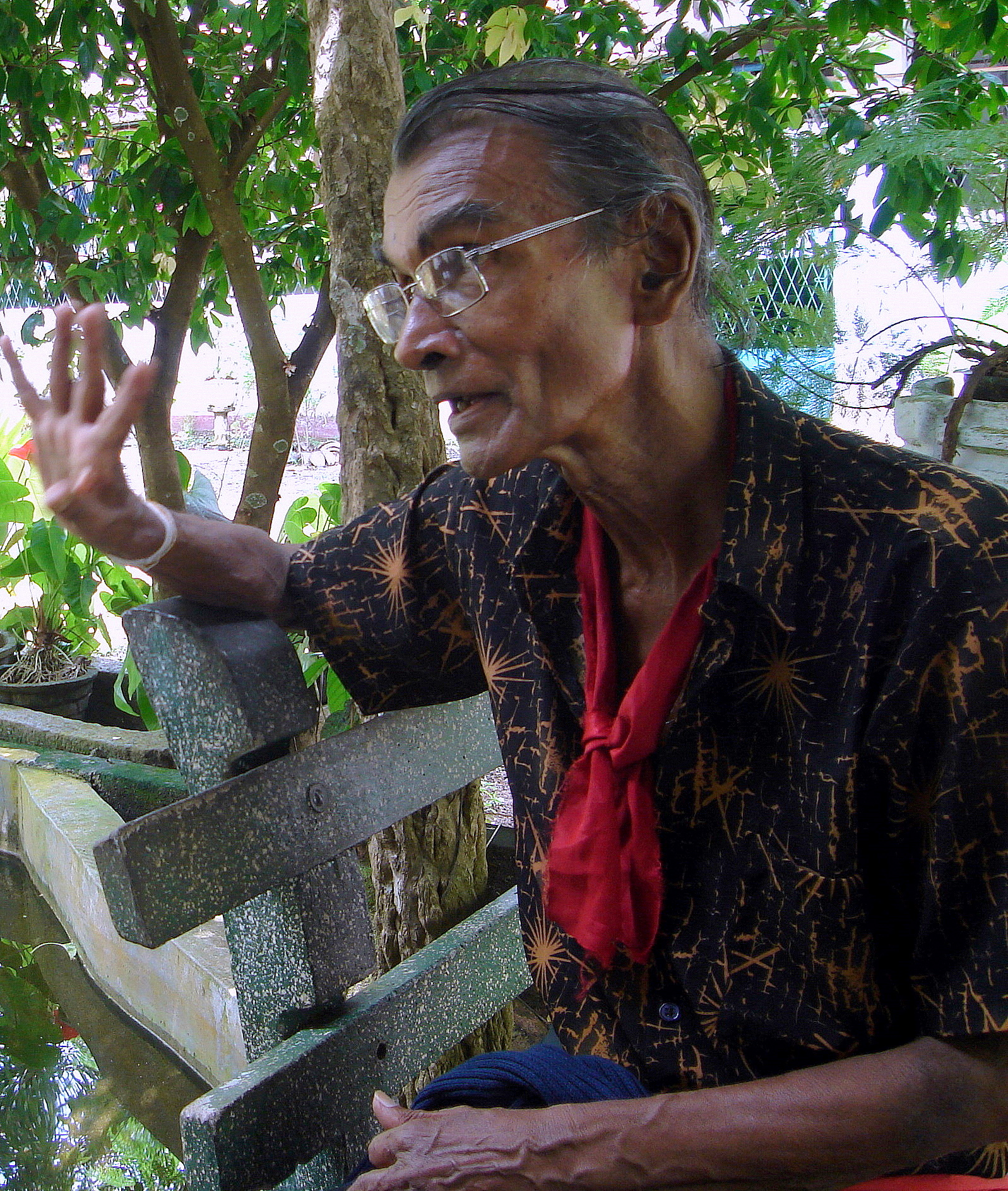
- At Malamulla Sri Sudarshanarama temple, Kiriberiya, Panadura, Sri Lanka in 2009
- Born: Gamini Kalyanadarsha Haththotuwegama; 29 November 1939; Galle, Sri Lanka
- Died: 30 October 2009 (aged 69); Colombo
- Other names: GK, Hatha, Haththa
- Education: Richmond College, Galle
- Occupations: Playwright, educator, actor, director, critic
- Years active: 1965–2008
- Awards: Kala Keerthi (1995)

Kala Keerthi Dr. Gamini Kalyanadarsha Haththotuwegama (born 29 November 1939 – died 30 October 2009 as ගාමිණී හත්තොටුවේගම) was a Sri Lankan playwright, director, actor, critic and educator. He was widely known as the father of Sri Lanka's modern street theatre. He was among the most influential directors of post-independent Sri Lanka.

== Personal life ==
He was born on 29 November 1939 in Galle. He completed his education at Richmond College, Galle. He entered the University of Peradeniya in 1956 and obtained an Honors Degree in English. After obtaining his degree, he moved back to Galle and worked as an English teacher and the teacher-in-charge of drama at Richmond College. Then, in 1965, Haththotuwegama joined with the University of Kelaniya (known as "Vidyalankara University of Ceylon, Kelaniya" in his days) as a lecturer of English. He retired from four decades of university service in 2005.

He died on 30 October 2009 at the age of 73 due to long prevailed cancer.

== Career ==
While studying at the University of Peradeniya, he played the lead role in the English language drama 'Agachemnan. He also produced Anton Chekhov's play "The Proposal" with the title Magul Prasthawa, in Sinhala and played the role of Loveris. In 1967, Haththotuwegama was also the President of the Film Critics and Writers Association.

At the University of Kelaniya, Haththotuwegama had some experimental performances such as Ranga Kebali Samaga Sochchamak. He made his first appearance in Raja Darshana at the Vidyalankara University. On 4 June 1974, he presented three short plays - Raja Darshana, Bosath Dekma and Minihekuta Ella Marenna Barida - shown at the Anuradhapura Railway Stadium. On the way back to Colombo the next day, at the Anuradhapura railway station, the drama Minihekuta Ella Marenna Barida was presented as a street drama, becoming the first historical street drama in Sri Lanka.

He has produced several popular stage dramas such as Merawara Mehewara, Akeekaru Puthraya, Oba Dutuwa, Paraviyek Dakka Kal, Loka Ahara Sammelanaya, Otunnaka Bara and Nurussana Handa. The drama Paraviyek Dakka Kal was based on the racist riot and Oba Dutuwa based on 88-89 terror era.

He later acted in stage drama such as Saakki and produced plays such as Lark and Hamlet on the stage.

A special street drama presentation was held on Sunday, November 29 at 6.00 pm at the Mangala Methodist Church, Moratuwa to commemorate the 71st birth anniversary of Dr. Haththotuwegama.
