= Sarath Gunapala =

Physicist

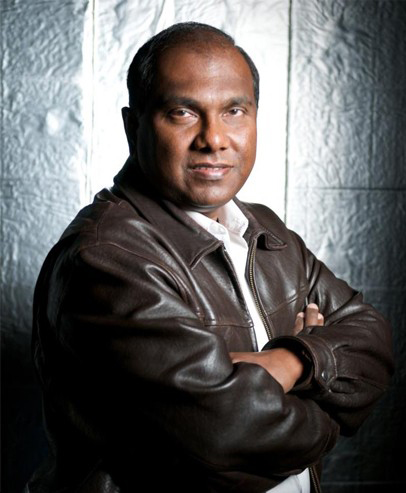
- Sarath Gunapala.
- Born: Yatiyantota, Kegalle, Sri Lanka
- Education: Nalanda College Colombo; University of Colombo; University of Pittsburgh
- Known for: Quantum Well Infrared Photodetector, infrared imaging technology
- Spouse: Vajira née Udukumbura
- Scientific career
- Workplaces: Jet Propulsion Laboratory of NASA

Sri Lanka Ranjana Dr Sarath Gunapala (Sinhala:සරත් ගුණපාල) is a solid-state physicist, senior research scientist and group supervisor at NASA's Jet Propulsion Laboratory. He works primarily in Quantum Well Infrared Photo Detecting. He is also a board member of Quantum Well Infrared Photodetector Technologies LLC. Gunapala lives in the suburbs of Los Angeles. He was born in Sri Lanka.

After receiving his education from Nalanda College, Colombo, Gunapala graduated from University of Colombo and University of Pittsburgh.

Gunapala was presented with Nalanda Keerthi Sri award in 2006 by his alma mater Nalanda College, Colombo.
