= K. Jayatillake =

Sri Lankan writer (1926–2011)

Kaluarachige Jayathilaka
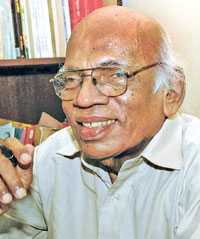
- Born: Kaluachchigamage Jayathilaka; 27 June 1926; Kannimahara, Gampaha, Sri Lanka
- Died: 14 September 2011 (aged 85)
- Education: Kirindiwela M.M.V. School
- Occupation: Author
- Years active: 1955–2011
- Spouse: Sumana Jayatillake
- Awards: Sahitya Ratna Literary Award

Kaluachchigamage Jayatillake (Sinhala: කේ.ජයතිලක; 27 June 1926 – 14 September 2011), known as K. Jayatillake, was a Sinhala novelist and literary critic. He was born in Kannimahara, Gampaha District, Sri Lanka and was a contemporary of Mahagama Sekara having studied in the same school. He married Sumana Jayatillake and was the father of four children.

Jayathilaka's first creative work, Punaruppattiya, a collection of short stories published in 1955, which was well received. His award-winning novel, Charitha Thunak, published in 1963, begins with a scene of peasants working in the field, evoking the intimate relationship between the villager and the earth.

== Books ==
- Parajithayo
- Charitha Thunak
- Punchirala
- Punchiralage Maranaya
- Rajapakshe Walawwa
- Pitha Maha
- Piya Saha Puththu
- Aprasanna Kathawa
- Adishtana
- Kalo Ayanthe
- Maya Maliga
- Manahkalpitha Vartavak Hevath Ardha Navakatavak
- Mahallekuge Prema Katavak
- Mathu Sambandai
- Ekagei Avurudhdha
- Vajira Pabbatha
- Katu Saha Mal
- Diyaniya Apasu Yai
- Punaruthpaththiya
- Delowata Nathi Aya
- අතීරණය
