= Mohan Munasinghe =

Sri Lankan academic

- Born: Colombo, Sri Lanka
- Education: Royal College, Colombo, Cambridge University, Massachusetts Institute of Technology (MIT), McGill University and Concordia University
- Occupations: Economist, Sustainable Development, Energy, Water & Climate Change Expert
- Employer: Munasinghe Institute for Development (MIND)
- Known for: Vice-Chair of the Intergovernmental Panel on Climate Change (IPCC)
- Title: Professor
- Spouse(s): Sria Munasinghe, Exec.Vice Chair, Munasinghe Inst. for Development (MIND)
- Children: Dr. Ranjva Munasinghe, CEO MIND Analytics & Management; Dr. Anusha Munasinghe Gunasekera, Senior Manager, Sanaria Inc. USA
- Website: Mohan Munasinghe

Mohan Munasinghe is a Sri Lankan physicist, engineer and economist with a focus on energy, water resources, sustainable development and climate change. He was the 2021 Blue Planet Prize Laureate, and Vice-Chair of the Intergovernmental Panel on Climate Change (IPCC), which shared the 2007 Nobel Peace Prize with former Vice-President of the United States Al Gore. Munasinghe is the Founder Chairman of the Munasinghe Institute for Development. He has also served as an honorary senior advisor to the government of Sri Lanka since 1980.

== Education ==
Born in Sri Lanka, Prof. Munasinghe was educated at Royal College, Colombo. He received a BA (Hons.) in Engineering in 1967 and a MA later from the University of Cambridge. Thereafter he gained an SM and PE in Electrical Engineering from the Massachusetts Institute of Technology in 1970; a PhD in Solid State Physics from McGill University in 1973 and an MA in Development Economics from Concordia University in 1975. He has received several honorary doctorates, honoris causa.

== Career ==
From 1982 to 1987, he was the Senior Advisor (Energy and Information Technology) to the President of Sri Lanka, helping to formulate and implement the national energy strategy and computer policy. He was the founder chairman, of the Computer and Information Technology Council (CINTEC), and served on the Presidential Commission that determined national telecommunications policy. During this period, he also served as a board member, of the Natural Resources, Energy and Science Authority of Sri Lanka; Governor, of Arthur Clarke Centre for Modern Technology, Sri Lanka; and founder-President of the Sri Lanka Energy Managers Association. He was involved with the Intergovernmental Panel on Climate Change since its inception in 1988 and had served as Chancellor of the International Water Academy in Oslo. From 1990 to 1992 Munasinghe was Advisor to the US President's Council on Environmental Quality (PCEQ). Until 2002 he was a Senior Manager/Advisor at the World Bank.

As an academic, he serves as a distinguished guest professor at the University of Peking, and a visiting professor at the United Nations University in Tokyo. Formerly, he was Director-General and Professor of Sustainable Development at the Sustainable Consumption Institute, University of Manchester, and Institute Professor at the Vale Sustainable Development Institute, Federal University of Para, Brazil. He also served on the board of directors of Green Cross International and was a member of the Club of Rome. He has authored or co-authored over 120 books and 400 journal articles. He is widely recognised for having first proposed the Sustainomics framework for making development more sustainable at the 1992 Earth Summit in Rio de Janeiro, and more recently for proposing the Millennium Consumption Goals at the United Nations. He was visiting professor at the Technische Universität Darmstadt.

== Awards and honours ==
Listed are some key awards and honours Prof. Munasinghe has received;

- Blue Planet Prize Laureate (2021)
- Officer of the French Legion of Honour (2017)
- Eminence in Engineering Award 2014 - highest prize bestowed by the Institute of Engineers, apex Engineering body in Sri Lanka, for exceptional contributions to the profession of engineering and to sustainable development in Sri Lanka and worldwide.
- Anita Garibaldi Gold Medal for meritorious services to humanity (Brazilian government, 2007)
- Sarvodaya Award for Humanity, Peace and Development (2007)
- Vice-Chair of the Intergovernmental Panel on Climate Change (IPCC), which shared the 2007 Nobel Peace Prize (2007)
- Zayed International Prize for Environment (jointly with other authors) for contributions to the Millennium Ecosystem Assessment (2006)
- Order of Fellowship (honoris causa) of the Independent University of Bangladesh for exceptional contributions to energy, economics and the environment (Bangladesh, 2005)
- Outstanding lifetime achievements award from 16 major professional bodies (Sri Lanka, 2003)
- Adelman-Frankel prize for unique and innovative contributions to energy research from the USAEE (US, 2003)
- Green award for exceptional contributions to sustainable development from the Int. Federation of Environmental Journalists (1998)
- International best treatise award and medal for sustainable water resource management presented at the 1994 World Water Congress (Abu Dhabi, 1994).
- Award for outstanding contributions to energy economics from the Int. Assoc. of Energy Economists (US, 1986)
- Sinha Gold Medal for outstanding scientific achievement from the Lions Clubs International (Sri Lanka, 1985)
- Albert M. Grass Prize (MIT, US, 1968)
- J. W. Beauchamp Prize (IET, UK, 1966)

== Bibliography ==
Prof. Munasinghe has authored over 120 academic books and 400 technical papers; . Publications include:

- Munasinghe, Mohan (2019). Sustainability in the 21st Century: applying Sustainomics to implement the sustainable development goals. Cambridge University Press. ISBN 978-1-108-40415-0.
- Munasinghe, Mohan (2010). Making development more sustainable: sustainomics framework and practical applications. MIND Press. ISBN 978-1-108-40415-0.
- Munasinghe, Mohan (2009). Sustainable development in practice: sustainomics methodology and applications. Cambridge University Press. ISBN 978-0-521-89540-8.
- Munasinghe, Mohan (2006). Macroeconomic policies for sustainable growth: analytical framework and policy studies of Brazil and Chile. Edward Elgar. ISBN 1-84542-494-8.
- Rosa, Luiz Pinguelli; Mohan Munasinghe (2002). Ethics, equity, and international negotiations on climate change. Edward Elgar. ISBN 1-84376-048-7.
- Munasinghe, Mohan; Osvaldo Sunkel; Carlos de Miguel (2001). The sustainability of long-term growth: socioeconomic and ecological perspectives. Edward Elgar. ISBN 1-84064-515-6.
- Jepma, C. J.; Mohan Munasinghe, Netherlands, Stockholm Environment Institute, Beijer International Institute of Ecological Economics (1998). Climate change policy: facts, issues and analyses. Cambridge University Press. ISBN 0-521-59688-2.
