= Tissa Devendra =

Sri Lankan writer and civil servant

- Born: 1929; Colombo, Sri Lanka
- Died: 22 June 2023 (aged 94)
- Education: Nalanda College, Colombo; Dharmaraja College<bt>Ananda College, Colombo; University of Ceylon; University of Cambridge

Deshamanya Tissa Devendra (1929 – 22 June 2023) was a Sri Lankan writer and civil servant.

== Early life and education ==
Devendra received his education from Dharmaraja College, Nalanda College, Colombo and Ananda College Colombo. He later graduated from University of Ceylon and University of Cambridge.

== Career ==
Devendra's career in the public service started in 1953 as a District Land Officer. Later was General Manager of the River Valleys Development Project in Walawe.

Devendra served 40 years in the public service and was the Government Agent in Matara, Trincomalee and Jaffna. He also held positions as Chairman of the Public Service Commission, and Chairman of the Salaries Commission. First President of the Colombo University Alumni Association. Tissa also served as National Expert for the FAO and United Nations.

== Author ==
Devendra was an author and wrote a number of books, in both Sinhalese and English. His book Tales from the Provinces was short-listed for the Gratiaen Prize in 1998. Devendra was also a reviewer of English films along with the late Regi Siriwardena, Donald Abeysinghe, and Mervyn De Silva.

Devendra scripted a television documentary on George Keyt in 1987. His published books include:

- Sri Lanka: The Emerald Island (1996)
- A Fiery Finale
- Tales from the Provinces (1998)
- Princes, Peasants and Clever Beasts (2002)
- More Princes, Peasants and Clever Beasts
- On Horseshoe Street (2005)
- Memoirs of a Penpusher: Kachcheries and Commissions
- Quest for Shangri-La: Stories and Diversions

== Death ==
Tissa Devendra died on 22 June 2023, at the age of 94.

== Sources ==
- Fabulous out of the mundane
- Reading: it's Tissa's business
- Tissa Devendra - Belletrist
- Tissa Devendra - Chairperson
- On Horseshoe Street : Window to a bygone era
- Recalling a post-colonial past
- As I Like It Traversing with Tissa Devendra
- DR. D.W.DEVENDRA – THE OLDEST NALANDIAN REMEMBERS
