= Sanghamitta Balika Vidyalaya =

- Wakwella Road, Galle; Sri Lanka

Information
- Type: Government Public School
- Motto: Sadhu Sabbaththa Sanwaro(සාධු සබ්බත්ත සංවරෝ)
- Established: 1919 March 19
- Founder: Hon. Francis Amarasiri Wickramasinghe Muhandiram
- Principal: Aheni D.Paranavithana
- Staff: Over 190 staff members
- Grades: Primary to G.C.E. (A/L)
- Gender: Girls
- Age: 6 to 19
- Enrollment: 4900+
- Campus size: 1.4Acres
- Colours: Green and Gold
- Website: sanghamittavidyalaya.lk

Sanghamitta Balika Vidyalaya (also called: Sanghamitta Girls' College) is a Buddhist girls' school in Galle, Sri Lanka. It is a national school, which provides primary and secondary education. The school was established in 1919. Francis Amarasiri Wickramasinghe Muhandiram was the founder of Sanghamitta Balika Vidyalaya.

== See also ==
- Mahinda College
