= Thisuri Wanniarachchi =

Sri Lankan author

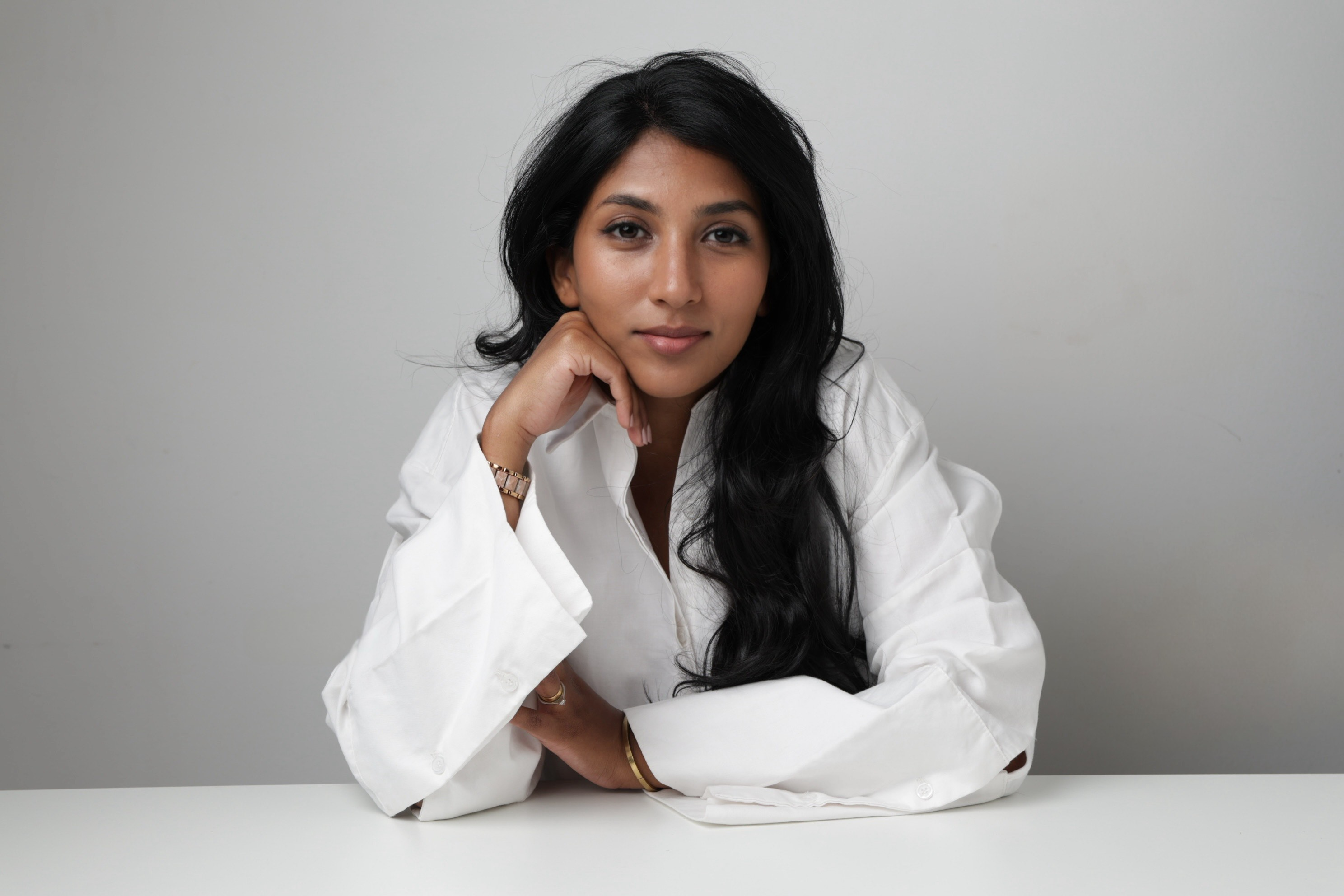
- Wanniarachchi photographed by Sanjeewa Weerasinghe in 2025
- Born: September 25, 1993 (age 32)
- Education: Bennington College; Kansai Gaidai University; University of Colombo

Thisuri Wanniarachchi (Sinhala: තිසුරි වන්නිආරච්චි) is a Sri Lankan author and public policy specialist. She is known for her books Colombo Streets, which won a 2009 State Literary Award, and The Terrorist's Daughter (2014) She is also known for her stint as President Maithripala Sirisena's Assistant Director of Sustainable Development and the National Coordinator of the "Vision 2030" Sustainable Development Policy Formulation Project. and her work for the World Bank. Wanniarachchi resigned from her position in the Sirisena Administration in the immediate aftermath of the unconstitutional coup of October 2018. She later served as the Secretary to the President's Expert Committee to Restructure SriLankan Airlines. Wanniarachchi also served as the Lead Analyst of the Ministry of Economic Reforms in the Government of Sri Lanka in 2019.

== Early life and education ==
Wanniarachchi was born on 25 September 1993 to Sri Lankan sociologist and author Malraji Wanniarachchi and Sri Lanka Army Maj. General Sunil Wanniarachchi. She grew up in Colombo during the time of the Sri Lankan Civil War.

She attended St. Bridget's Convent in Colombo and later moved to The British School in Colombo on a full academic scholarship. Wanniarachchi received her BA in Political Economy from Bennington College, and completed her PhD in Public Policy at the University of Colombo in 2025.

== Career ==
She was President Maithripala Sirisena's Assistant Director of Sustainable Development and the youngest appointee to serve in his administration. Wanniarachchi resigned from her position in the Sirisena Administration in the immediate aftermath of the unconstitutional coup of October 2018. She later served as the Secretary to the President's Expert Committee to Restructure SriLankan Airlines. In 2019, she was appointed as the Lead Analyst of the Ministry of Economic Reforms in the Government of Sri Lanka. and during which time she led an analytics division that advised the Cabinet Committee on Cost of Living, proposed and implemented regulatory designs for various essential commodity markets, and oversaw the formulation of pricing formulae for several essentials including liquid petroleum gas (LPG), full cream milk powder (FCMP) and wheat flour.

=== Author ===
Wanniarachchi is the author of two books, Colombo Streets and The Terrorist's Daughter. Wanniarachchi wrote Colombo Streets when she was fourteen years old. Colombo Streets is a story about how children belonging to different social classes experienced the Sri Lankan civil war. The book went on to be a local bestseller and made Wanniarachchi the youngest State Literary Award recipient.

The Terrorist's Daughter, written by Wanniarachchi during her first year at Bennington College, was launched in Sri Lanka in August 2014.

== Bibliography ==
- Colombo Streets (2009)
- The Terrorist's Daughter (2014)
