= Parakrama Kodituwakku =

Sri Lankan poet (born 1965)

Kala Suri Parakrama Kodituwakku, is a notable Sinhala poet. After the revival and experimentations of Sinhala poetry during the 1950s and 1960s, the 1970s were marked by the rise of several young poets including Parakrama Kodituwakku, Monica Ruwanpathirana and Rathna Sri Wijesinghe. His "Podi Malliye" (1972) was praised by critics and after "Otunna Hini Kumaraya" (1975) he didn't publish anything new until the 1990s except several poems in newspapers.

== Books ==
- Podi Malliye (1973)
- Akeekaru Puthrayaku Ge Lokaya (1974)
- Aluth Minihek Awith (1975)
- Pibidena Peya (1979, first Sinhala translations of poetry by Tamil labourers)
- Indu saha Lanka (1979, first Sinhala translations of Tamil poems of Sri Lanka and India)
- Otunna Himi Kumaraya
- Rashmi (1992, State Literary Award for Best Poetry)
- Dewinage Minisun (1996, Jayasankha Independent Literary Award for Best Poetry)
- Diwaman Gajaman (1999, Self-Publishers Award for Best Poetry)
- Lovi Kahata (2000, State Literary Award for Best Poetry, Vidyodaya University Award for Best Poetry)
- Aloka Minisa (2004, Swarna Padma Award for Best Poetry)
- Jyothi Rashmi Rathri (2006)
- Sansareta Mang Asai (2007)
- Rosa Male Hadawatha (2008, short stories)
- Mahathek Sitee Hondin (2009)
- Jeewika Asillehi (2010)
- Oba Samaga (2010, novel)
- Sulange Diwu Kella (2011, short stories)
- Rathu Rosa Nil Rosa (2013, Red Roses Blue Roses, Sinhala translations of 20th century poetry from around the world)
- Clara (2014, novel)
- Mama Wahinawa (2017, poetry)
