= Anne Ranasinghe =

German writer (1925–2016)

- Born: Anneliese Katz; 2 October 1925; Essen, Germany
- Died: 17 December 2016 (aged 91); Colombo, Sri Lanka
- Occupation: Poet
- Writing career
- Language: English
- Notable awards: State Literary Award 1994

Anne Ranasinghe (born Anneliese Katz; 2 October 1925 – 17 December 2016) was a Jewish-German born Sri Lankan English-language poet. She is considered one of Sri Lanka's leading English-language poets, having won several international awards.

== Early life ==
Anneliese Katz was born on 2 October 1925 in Essen, Germany, to a Jewish family. A victim of Nazi Germany's atrocities against Jews, she witnessed the Kristallnacht (night of broken glass), the burning of the Essen synagogue. In 1939, her parents sent her to England to an aunt she had never seen before. Within a week she was sent to a school 140 miles away to live among strangers and to learn English, a new language to her. Within six months World War II broke out and much later she learned that her parents had been murdered by the Nazis.

Anne completed her studies at Parkstone Grammar School and trained to become a nursing sister at Charing Cross Hospital, King's College, Moorfields, Chelsea and Burden Neurological Institute.

== Literary work ==
Ranasinghe began her writing career in the late 1960s after obtaining a Diploma in Journalism from Colombo Technical College. In 1971, she published her first poem collection, And the Sun That Sucks The Earth to Dry. Some of Ranasinghe's well known poems include July 1983, Plead Mercy (1974), A Long Hot Day and At What Dark Point (1970). She has published 12 books and has been translated into several languages in seven countries.

From 1975, Ranasinghe worked for the Amnesty International's South Asian Publications Service in Sri Lanka.

=== Recognition ===
Ranasinghe was awarded Sri Lanka Arts Council Prize for Poetry in 1985 and again in 1992 and also for non-fiction in 1987. She won the Sri Lankan State Literary Award for best collection of short stories in 1994. She was awarded the Order of Merit of the Federal Republic of Germany, the nation's only federal civilian award.

== Personal life ==
In 1949, Anne married D. A. Ranasinghe, a post-graduate student who later became a lecturer and professor of obstetrics and gynecology at the Colombo Medical School, and moved to Sri Lanka. She had seven children, four of her own and three from her husband's previous marriage. Her own four children are sons Ananda and Nihal, and daughters Shanthi and Renuka, all of whom live abroad.

== Death and legacy ==
Anne Ranasinghe died 17 December 2016 in her Colombo residence in Rosmead Place, at age of 91. Sri Lankan school children study her poems for their English literature coursework in GCE Ordinary Level.

== Bibliography ==
- Mascot and Symbol. 1997.
- Desire and other Stories. 1994, reprint 1995.
- You Ask Me Why I Write Poems. 1994.
- The Letter and Other Stories. 1994.
- At What Dark Point. 1991, reprinted and updated 1996.
- Not Even Shadows. 1991.
- Against Eternity and Darkness. 1985, reprinted 1985, 1988, 1996.
- Of Charred Wood Midnight Fear. 1983.
- Love, Sex and Parenthood. 1978.
- Plead Mercy. 1975.
- With Words We Write Our Lives Past, Present, Future. 1972.
- Poems - And a Sun That Sucks The Earth to Dry. 1971

Source: nurse.info
