= St. Thomas' Girls' High School =

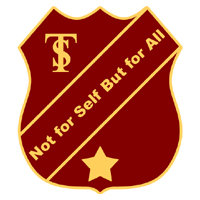
- Matara; Sri Lanka

Information
- Type: All-girls government school.
- Motto: "Not for Self, But for All."
- Established: 1885
- Staff: 150
- Grades: 6–13
- Gender: Girls
- Age range: 11 to 19
- Enrollment: 3,000+
- Colors: Red and yellow
- Affiliation: Christianity
- Website: www.thomiangirls.sch.lk

St. Thomas' Girls' High School is a girls' school in Sri Lanka's southernmost district Matara.

== History ==
From the end of 1939 to the end of 1945, Somakumari Samarasinha was principal. She was followed by Mrs. Wijeratna and Mrs. Buddhapriya. They were followed by Mrs. De Silva and Mrs. Bultjens. The school started at a rented house on Main Street, Matara. It was moved to its present location in Walpola in 1950. In 2009, one student died in hospital and 27 others were treated in hospital after they had received a rubella vaccination in the school.

== Principals ==
	Period	Name
1st	–	Mrs.Calendar

== College houses ==
- Amethyst: Purple
- Emerald: Green
- Ruby: Red
- Sapphire: Blue The best house
