= S. D. Gunadasa =

Sri Lankan businessman (1931–2014)

- Born: Sunna Deniya Gunadasa; 5 September 1931; Talalla Gandara Matara
- Died: 6 July 2014 (aged 82); Colombo, Sri Lanka
- Resting place: Colombo
- Occupation: Businessman
- Title: Sri Lanka Sikhamani
- Partner: Srimathi
- Parent(s): S. D. Romanis Silva (father), M. D. Kaluhamy (mother)

Sri Lanka Sikhamani Sunna Deniya Gunadasa (5 September 1931 – 6 July 2014) (known as S. D. Gunadasa or Dasa Mudalali) was a Sri Lankan business magnate who brought the concept of the supermarket to Sri Lanka in 1977. He later became a garment manufacturer in Sri Lanka, and subsequently the Chairman and founder of DASA Group.

== Early childhood ==
Gunadasa was born in the village of Talalla Gandara in Matara, the youngest of the three sons. In his early years, Gundasa was educated at a local village school in Gandara. Influenced by his mother's organising and delegation skills, he became an entrepreneur.

== Career ==
Gunadasa began his business career as a street hawker in Colombo, selling shirts, vests, and other clothing items. Some days, he would carry his products into the city in a basket on his head. On successful days, he would treat himself to a biriyani dinner as a reward.

As his enterprise grew, he was able to purchase his own premises. Later, he opened Sri Lanka's first supermarket and department store, a new type of store for the country at the time. Gunadasa focused on employee benefits, an area that other employers often overlooked. He provided free lodging and, reportedly, a barber for employees' convenience.

Gundasa later turned to garment manufacturing. He produced clothing under the brand name Duro, which was accepted by international markets in the United States and Europe.

== Honours ==
Gunadasa was honored with the National Award of Sri Lanka Sikhamani by the government of the Democratic Socialist Republic of Sri Lanka in 1985.

== Death ==
Gunadasa died on 6 July 2014 at the age of 83 due to natural causes. His remains are located at the Borella General Cemetery in Colombo, Sri Lanka.
