= Veera Chudamani =

Sri Lankan national award

Veera Chudamani වීර චූඩාමනී

Awarded by The Government of Sri Lanka
- Type: Title of honor/Order of merit
- Eligibility: Sri Lankan citizens
- Criteria: Highly notable service to the nation
- Status: Currently constituted

Statistics
- First induction: 1986
- Last induction: 2019

Veera Chudamani (Sinhala: වීර චූඩාමනී) is a national honour for bravery awarded in Sri Lanka. It is awarded "for acts of bravery of the highest order". It is conventionally used as a title or prefix to the awardee's name.

Veera Chudamani ranks lower than Deshabandhu.

== Awardees ==
Awardees include:

1998

- Manorani Saravanamuttu - Founded the Centre for Family Service

2005

- Hettiarachchige Gamini Sirisoma Jayasekera
