= Kala Suri =

Sri Lankan national honour

Kala Suri කලා සූරී கலாசூரி

Awarded by The Government of Sri Lanka
- Type: Title of honor/Order of merit
- Eligibility: Sri Lankan citizens
- Criteria: Highly notable service to the nation in Art, cinema and music
- Status: Currently constituted

Statistics
- First induction: 1986
- Last induction: 2019

Precedence
- Next (higher): Kala Keerthi

The Kala Suri (Sinhala: කලා සූරී; Tamil: கலாசூரி, romanized: Kalācūri) is a Sri Lankan national honour awarded "for special contributions to the development of the arts". It is conventionally used as a title or prefix to the awardee's name. Kala Suri ranks lower than Vidya Nidhi.

== Awardees ==
Awardees include:

1984

- Arisen Ahubudu

1991

- Thangamma Appakutty

1994

- Yolande Abeywira

1998

- Jiffry Yoonoos
- Parakrama Kodituwakku
- Dharmasiri Bandaranayake
- G. S. B. Rani
- S. A D. D. Samarasekera
- D. V. Richard de Silva
- Jayalath Manoratne
- Tissa Abeysekera
- A. Sivanesa Selvan

2005

- Anne Ranasinghe
- Anoma Rajakaruna
- Barbara Sansoni Lewcock
- Chandraguptha Thenuwara
- Channa Wijewardena
- Chitra Ranawake
- Dulip Gabada Mudalige
- Edward Jayakody
- H. A. Perera
- Harsh Makalanda
- Inoka Sathyangani Keerthinanda
- Jagath Weerasinghe
- Janadasa Peiris
- Latha Walpola
- M. A. Nuhuman
- Muhanned Mohideen Abdul Cader
- Nelum Harasgama Nadaraja
- Oosha Saravanamuttu
- Parakrama Niriella
- Pradeep Chandrasiri
- Pushpakumara Kandegedara
- R. Rushankan
- Rajini Selvanayagam
- Rohana Baddage
- Rohanadeva Perera
- Subramanium Vilvaratnam
- Sarath Chandrajeewa
- Somaratne Dissanayake
- Stanley Omar
- Sumathy Sivamohan
- T. Shanathanan
- Udaya Shantha Fernando
