= State Literary Award (Sri Lanka) =

The State Literary Award
- Awarded for: Best books of the year written in Sri Lanka
- Location: Colombo, Sri Lanka
- First award: 1959; 67 years ago
- Website: www.cultural.gov.lk

The State Literary Award is a set of annual literary prizes by the Government of Sri Lanka under several categories. The awards cover fiction, poetry, translations, songs and cover designs. Works from Sinhala, Tamil and English language are reviewed.

== Winners ==
Best Novels
Year	English Novel	Tamil Novel	Sinhala Novel
2009	Colombo Streets - Thisuri Wanniarachchi	Sule - V.P. Arunanandam	Kandak Sema - Sumithra Rahubadda
