= Veera Prathapa =

National honour of Sri Lanka

The Veera Prathapa (Sinhala: වීර ප්‍රතාප) is a non titular national honour of Sri Lanka awarded "for acts of bravery of the highest order". Veera Prathapa ranks lower than Sri Lanka Thilaka.

== Awardees ==
Awardees include:

1998

- Cprl. R. P. R. Wickramapala, WV
- O. R. A. K. Perera
- Amithapala Weerasinghe

2017

- Aluth Gedara Ranjith Amarajeewa
- Rankoth Gedara Shanaka Prasad Kumara

== See also ==
- George Medal
