= Orders, decorations, and medals of Sri Lanka =

Sri Lankan system of awards

In the Democratic Socialist Republic of Sri Lanka, individuals are recognized for personal bravery, achievement, or service with the with national honours. The national honours consists of several types of awards:

- National Honours are civil honours awarded for service to the nation, bravery, scientific achievement, achievements in arts, culture and drama.
- Decorations tend to be used to recognise specific deeds;
  - Military decorations
- Medals are used to recognise service on a particular operation or in a specific theatre, long or valuable service, and good conduct.
  - Military medals
  - Police medals

Awards are conferred by the President of Sri Lanka on behalf of the Government of Sri Lanka, with the Presidential Secretariat being responsible for the administration of the honours.

== History ==
The Sinhalese monarchs rewarded their loyal subjects with titles and tokens of honor, with the last native kingdom, the Kingdom of Kandy, having an established system of honors that had been in practice since time immemorial. The British established their own system of honors for the island, incorporating indigenous titles and Imperial honors by the late nineteenth century. Until 1972, the British honours system was in place in Ceylon along with several indigenous titles, however, since 1956 no nominations were made for these honours and were automatically discontinued after Sri Lanka became a republic.

The modern national honours of Sri Lanka was constituted in 1986 by the Extraordinary Gazette No. 387/3 issued on 2 March 1986, which established a uniquely indigenous honours system of titles, decorations and medals which are awarded to recognise achievements of, or service by, Sri Lankans or others in connection with Sri Lanka. This was followed by amendments mentioned in the Government Gazette No. 627/8 issued on 12 September 1990, Government Gazette No. 863/4 issued on 20 March 1995 and Government Gazette No. 1535/12 8 February 2008. Many of the awards are titular.

== Selection and awards ==
Nominations for national honors are made by cabinet ministers and provincial governors. A select committee nominated by the President and chaired by the Prime Minister’s Secretary review the nominations. This list is then reviewed by a group of scholars chosen by the President's Secretary and selects recipients for appointment by the President.

The recipient's names are formally published in a gazette, after which the awards are presented by the President on a special ceremony that may fall on the National Independence Day, National Heroes Day, and events honoring non-Sri Lankan honorees.

== Civil Honour ==
These include the following in the order of their ranking, which are used as titles;

=== For service to the nation ===
==== Sri Lankabhimanya ====
The Sri Lankabhimanya (Pride of Sri lanka) is conferred to "those who have rendered exceptionally outstanding and most distinguished service to the nation". The honour can only be held by five Sri Lankans at a time, and also can be conferred posthumously.

==== Deshamanya ====
The Deshamanya (Pride of the Nation) is the second highest Sri Lankan national honour, awarded by the Government of Sri Lanka "for highly meritorious service".

==== Deshabandhu ====
The Deshabandhu (Kin of the Nation) is the third-highest Sri Lankan national honour. It is awarded "for meritorious service".

==== Sri Lanka Shikhamani ====
The Sri Lanka Shikhamani (Precious Gem of Sri Lanka) is a national honour "for service to the nation".

==== Sri Lanka Thilaka ====
The Sri Lanka Thilaka (Thilaka of Sri Lanka, i.e. Brave Adornment on Forehead of Sri Lanka) is a non-titular national honour "for service to the nation".

=== For bravery ===
==== Veera Chudamani ====
The Veera Chudamani (Brave Chudamani, i.e. Brave Adornment) is a National Honour awarded " for acts of bravery of the highest order". Veera Chudamani ranks lower than Deshabandhu.

==== Veera Prathapa ====
The Veera Prathapa (Brave Opulence) is a non-titular national honour awarded " for acts of bravery of the highest order". Veera Prathapa ranks lower than Sri Lanka Thilaka.

=== For scientific achievement ===
==== Vidya Jyothi ====
The Vidya Jyothi (Lusture of Knowledge) is a national honour awarded " for outstanding scientific and technological achievements". It is the highest national honour for science in Sri Lanka for outstanding contribution to the development of the country through dedicated work in the chosen field. It is conventionally used as a title or prefix to the awardee's name. Vidya Jyothi ranks lower than Veera Chudamani.

==== Vidya Nidhi ====
The Vidya Nidhi (Treasure of Knowledge) is a national honour awarded " for meritorious scientific and technological achievements". Vidya Nidhi ranks lower than Sri Lanka Sikhamani.

=== For achievements in arts, culture and drama ===
==== Kala Keerthi ====
The Kala Keerthi (Glory of Art) is a national honour awarded " for extraordinary achievements and contributions in arts, culture and drama". It is the highest National Honour for arts, culture and drama in Sri Lanka. It is conventionally used as a title or prefix to the awardee's name. Kala Keerthi ranks lower than Vidya Jyothi

==== Kala Suri ====
The Kala Suri (Sun of Art) is a national honour awarded " for special contributions to the development of the arts". Kala Suri ranks lower than Vidya Nidhi.

=== For non-nationals ===
==== Sri Lanka Mitra Vibhushana ====
The Sri Lanka Mitra Vibhushana (Sri Lankan Friendship Decoration) is the highest Sri Lankan honour for non-citizens, reserved for heads of state and heads of government with which Sri Lanka has friendly relations "in appreciation of their friendship towards and solidarity with the people of Sri Lanka".

==== Sri Lanka Rathna ====
The Sri Lanka Rathna (Sri Lankan Friendship Jewel) is a Sri Lankan honour, for foreigners or non-nationals, awarded " for exceptional and outstanding service to the nation". It comprises a citation and a gold medal studded with nine "navaratnas" (Sri Lankan gems) with a Manel symbol (the country's national flower).

==== Sri Lanka Ranjana ====
The Sri Lanka Ranjana (Sri Lankan Friendship Delight) is a Sri Lankan honour, for foreigners or non-nationals, awarded " for distinguished service of highly meritorious nature".

==== Sri Lanka Ramya ====
The Sri Lanka Ramya (Delight of Sri Lanka) is a Sri Lankan honour, for foreigners or non-nationals, awarded "for distinguished service".

=== Vishishta Kaushalyabhimani ===
The Vishishta Kaushalyabhimani (Special Pride of Kaushalya) was established in 2023.

=== Vishishta Republica Abhimani ===
The Vishishta Republica Abhimani (Special Pride of the Republic) was established in 2023.

== Order of precedence ==
- Sri Lankabhimanya
- Deshamanya
- Deshabandhu
- Veera Chudamani
- Vidya Jyothi
- Kala Keerthi
- Sri Lanka Shikhamani
- Vidya Nidhi
- Kala Suri
- Sri Lanka Thilaka
- Veera Prathapa
- Sri Lanka Mitra Vibhushana
- Sri Lanka Rathna
- Sri Lanka Ranjana
- Sri Lanka Ramya
- Vishishta Kaushalyabhimani
- Vishishta Republica Abhimani

== Return ==
In January 2019, former civil servant Devanesan Nesiah returned the honour Deshamanya award to him in the 2017 national honours by President Maithripala Sirisena, following Sirisena's role in the 2018 Sri Lankan constitutional crisis.

== Non-honours ==
- In the past, Justice of the Peace appointments were made as honours by the Minister of Justice. This entitle the holder to place post nominals JP after their name.
- Religious and civil institutions in Sri Lanka commonly award various titles that are similar to national honors, however these are not recognised by the government and legislation is being drafted to stop such awards.

== See also ==
- Sanskritisation
- Military awards and decorations of Sri Lanka
- Awards and decorations of the Sri Lanka Police
