= Sri Lanka Ranjana =

The Sri Lanka Ranjana (Sinhala: ශ්‍රී ලංකා රන්ජන) is a national honour of Sri Lanka for foreigners or non nationals, awarded "for distinguished service of highly meritorious nature".

== Awardees ==
Awardees include:

2005

- Baik Sung-hak
- Evert Jongens
- Geoffrey Dobbs
- Monica De Decker-Deprez
- Raja Tridiv Roy
- Robert Woods
- Romesh Gunesekera
- Sung Woan-jong
- Tadashi Noguchi
- Wang Shihong
- Wolfgang Stange

2017

- Sarath Gunapala
- Siddhartha Kaul
