= Sri Lanka Thilaka =

Non-titular honour of Sri Lanka

The Sri Lanka Thilaka (Sinhala: ශ්‍රී ලංකා තිලක) is a non-titular national honour of Sri Lanka awarded "for service to the nation". Sri Lanka Thilaka ranks lower than Kala Suri.

== Awardees ==
Awardees include:

1998

- H. K. Hettiarachchi
- D. C. M. Piyatilake
- T. A. Sirisena
- K. Arnis
- Karunapala Aprakke
- Piyadasa Wickramanayake
- K. S. Jayasena
- G. Liyanage David
- M. R. T. Karunaratne
- Kuragala Pinsara
- W. Jayathilaka
- Edmund Opanayake
- G. S. B. Senanayake
- U. M. Haniffa (Maruthoor Ghani)
- S. V. P. Tikiri Panikkiya
- Sunil Premadasa

2005

- Nayanatara Gitani Fonseka
- Rohana Upendra Kuruppu
- T. M. Priyantha Nimal de Silva
- V. A. Thirugnanasuntharam

2017

- Adagamage Pandula Adagama
- Hema Bandara Jayasinghe

== See also ==
- Tilaka
