= Sri Lanka Rathna =

Sri Lanka's National honour

The Sri Lanka Rathna (Sinhala: ශ්‍රී ලංකා රත්න) is a national honour of Sri Lanka for foreigners or non nationals, awarded "for exceptional and outstanding service to the nation". It comprises a citation and a gold medal studded with nine "navaratnas" (Sri Lankan gems) with a Manel symbol (the country's national flower).

== Awardees ==
Awardees include:

1998

- Susumu Saegi

2005

- Bernard de Gaulle
- David C. Sanders
- Hosel Norota
- Sir Michael Morris
- Michael Ondaatje
- N. Ram
- S. D. Muni
- Tetsuya Hino
- Thilo W. Hoffmann

2019

- Yasushi Akashi
