= Vidya Nidhi =

Sri Lankan national honour

The Vidya Nidhi (Sinhala: විද්‍යා නිධි) is a Sri Lankan national honour awarded "for meritorious scientific and technological achievements". It is conventionally used as a title or prefix to the awardee's name. Vidya Nidhi ranks lower than Sri Lanka Shikhamani.

== Awardees ==
Awardees include:

1993

- Dr. (Vidya Nidhi, Vidya Shekara, Chudamani) Abhayasinghe Arachchige Stephen Abhayasinghe

1998

- Norman Rienzie de Silva
- S. K. Sayakkara
- Prematilake Wijesekera

2005

- Angulugaha Gamage Lasath Namal Gamage
- C. A. N. Fernando
- Chales Santiapillai
- H. H. Subasinghe
- M. A. K. L. Dissanayake
- Nimal Guanthilake
- Niriellage Chandrasiri
- P. Amitha Jayasinghe
- Raja Gnanasiri Hewa Bowala
- Shanthi Mendis
- S. M. H. Sena Banda
- V. Kumar
- W. P. Siripala

2017

- Sarath Somasiri Gunawardhana
- Don Tilak Dias Jayaweera Abeysekera
- Sivalingam Sivananthan
- Ahmed Mumtaz Masoon Cassim
- Herath Peruma Mudiyanselage Gunasena
- Lekamage Ramsay Lloyd Perera
- Mariapillai Sellamuthu Pillai Mookiah
- Somasundaram Sandarasegaram
- Vithanage Nimal Chandrasiri Gunasekera
- Wanninayake Mudiyanselage Tikiri Banda Wanninayake
