= Sri Lanka Shikhamani =

The Sri Lanka Shikhamani (Sri Lanka's precious gem Sinhala: ශ්‍රී ලංකා ශිඛාමනී) is a national honour of Sri Lanka "for service to the nation". It is conventionally used as a title or prefix to the awardee's name. Sri Lanka Shikhamani ranks lower than Kala Keerthi.

== Awardees ==
Awardees include:

1987

- Malliya Wadu Karunananda
- Halpawattage Hector Jeremius Peiris Jayawardene
- Hettiarachchige Don Sugathapala

1988

- Kudasingappulige Harry Christopher Gunawardena
- Nagoda Vithanage Franklin Nagaratne

1989

- Daisy Hemalatha Sugathadasa

1990

- Mohamad Yoosoof Mohamad Thahir
- Jayasinghe Mudalige Juwanis Jayasinghe
- Thamotharam Somasekeram
- Samarapperuma Mudiyanselage Palitha Samarapperuma
- Udaya Gamini Sarath Kumara Nambukara Withana
- Eugene Cyril Melanius Waas

1991

- Anula Menike Udalagama
- Percy Tristam Jinendradasa
- Wilbert Kaggodaarachchi
- Noeyal John Joseph Peiris
- Asoka Chandrasoma Wijesurendra

1992

- Wijesinghe Arachchige Abayasinghe
- Ratnayake Mudiyanselage Gunathilake Banda Hangillipola
- Jinadasa Kulupana
- Felicia Wakwalle Sorensen

1993

- Mohammed Zemzem Akbar
- Senanayakaralalage Appuhamy Millangoda
- Nagalingam Ratnasabapathy

1994

- Aboobacker Abdul Latiff Admani
- Don Dayananda Kasturiarachchi
- Muthu Banda Abayakoon Jayasekera
- Abdul Hameed Mohamed Maharoof
- Chandra Dissanayake
- Dennis Milton Hubert Ranaweera
- Kaluduru Somawathie de Silva Wickramasekera
- Abdul Samadh Ismail

2005

- Al-haj Mohamed Zainudeen Mohamed Badiudeen
- Ameena Faiz Musthapa
- B. E. S. J. Bastiampillai
- Kris Canekeratne
- Daya Rathnayake
- Daya Weththasinghe
- Edgar Gunetunga
- Ferrin Careem
- Gunadasa Kupuge
- Gunapala Nanayakkara
- H. Z. Jaffer
- Hiran Cooray
- Hiranthi Wijemanne
- Jayantha Balawardena
- J. K. D. S. H. Jayawardena
- J. M. S. Brito
- Jayasiri Mendis
- Kamala Peiris
- L. G. G. M. L. Mohammadu Naim
- M. Ramalingam
- Mahinda Palihawadana
- Mallika Hemachandra
- Manik Rodrigo
- Mendis Rohanadheera
- Mahamood Rizwan Shahabdeen
- Premila Senanayake
- R. I. T. Alles
- Rodney Vandergert
- Suppiah Achari Thiagarajah
- S. Arunachalam
- S. D. Gunadasa
- Sanath Ukwatte
- Tony Weerasinghe
- W. H. Piyadasa
- Y. Karunadasa
- Z. A. M. Refai

2017

- Achi Mohamed Ishaq
- Chulamani Gedara Gunasoma Nawarathne
- Hetti Arachchige Piyadasa Abeywardane
- Krishnamoorthi Ratnam Ravindran
- Leelananda Prematilleke
- Sellappuliyage Lucian Benedict Rosa
- S. Pathmanathan
