= Kala Keerthi =

The Kala Keerthi (Sinhala: කලා කීර්ති) is a Sri Lankan national honour awarded "for extraordinary achievements and contributions in arts, culture and drama". It is the highest national honour for arts, culture and drama in Sri Lanka. It is conventionally used as a title or prefix to the awardee's name. Kala Keerthi ranks lower than Vidya Jyothi.

== Awardees ==
Awardees include:

1986

- Wannakuwattawaduge Don Amaradeva
- Rohan de Saram
- Dayananda Ekanatha Hettiarachchi
- George Keyt
- Lester James Peries

1987

- Ananda Weihena Palliya Guruge
- Prof Nandadasa Kodagoda
- Anton Wickremasinghe

1988

- Prof Thomas Earle Joseph de Fonseka
- Dr Punchi Bandara Sannasgala
- Varindra Tarzie Vittachi

1989

- Eileen Siriwardhana
- Alankarage Victor Suraweera
- Lorna Srimathie Dewaraja
- Jinadasa Vijayatunge

1990

- Miniwandeni Pathirannehelage Tillakaratna
- Arumugam Kandiah

1991

- Wimal Abayasundera
- Diongu Badaturuge Nihalsinghe

1992

- Edwin Ariyadasa
- Ananda Salgado Kulasooriya

1993

- Sembuge Shelton Gamini Fonseka
- Miguel Hewage Goonatilleka
- Chitra Malinee Jayasinghe Peris
- Ponniah Poologasingham
- Jayadeva Tilakasiri
- Vini Vitharana

1994

- Pinnaduwa Hewa Cyril de Silva Kulathilaka
- Chitrasena
- Swarna Jayaweera
- Sinnathamby Thillainathan
- Madawala Sirisena Ratnayake
- Wimal Wickrama Surendra
- Mawanana Hewa Peter Silva
- Anuradha Seneviratne
- Nambukara Thanthrige Karunaratna Gunapala Senadheera
- Ashley Halpe

1998

- Premasiri Kemadasa
- Irangani Serasinghe
- Regi Siriwardena
- Dharmasiri Jayakody
- Nalini Jayasuriya

2005

- A. J. Canagarathnam
- A. Jesurasa
- A. Sivananthan
- Asoka Handagama
- Bharahmasri Sarveswara Sarma
- Carl Muller
- Dharmasena Pathiraja
- Dharmasiri Bandaranayake
- Enid Anula Aluvihare De Silva
- Gamini Haththotuwegama
- Geetha Kumarasinghe
- Gnarathan
- Henry Jayasena
- Jackson Anthony
- Jayalath Manoratne
- Karthigesu Sivathamby
- Kulanthai M. shunmugalingam
- Latha Walpola
- M. Kanakasabai
- Malini Fonseka
- Monica Ruwanpathirana (Posthumous)
- Olga De Livera
- T. B. Richard M. Don Gabriel
- Pandithar Sachchithanantham
- Prasanna Vithanage
- Rohana Weerasinghe
- S. Maunaguru
- S. Pani Bharatha (Posthumous)
- Sanath Gunathilake
- Sanath Nandasiri
- Santhini Sevanesan
- Shyam Selvadurai
- Sybil Wettasinghe
- Simon Navagattegama (Posthumous)
- Somalatha Subasinghe
- Sri Jayana Rajapakse
- Sumitra Peries
- Swarna Mallawarachchi
- Tilak Abeysinghe
- Tissa Ranasinghe
- Vimukthi Jayasundara
- Vasantha Obeysekera

2017

- Arun Dias Bandaranaike
- Edmand Ranasinghe
- G. Kartini Drahaman Mohamed
- George Edmond Jayasinghe
- Gunawardhana Mudalige Ajith Hemachandra
- Hapuwalanege Don Ariyadasa (Dasa Hapuwalana)
- Herman Ronald Lakshman De Alwis
- Ivor Dennis
- Kurukulasuriya Eligius Camillus Perera
- Lalitha Sarathchandra
- Lionel Bentharage
- Madhubhashini Disanayaka Ratnayaka
- Namel Weeramuni
- Nanayakkarage Sumana Jayatillake
- Nellampitiya Pathirana Arachchige Dayawathi (Daya Nellampitiya)
- Ranasinghe Arachchige Jayantha Prema Lal Hegoda
- Saravanai Vinayagamoorthy
- Singarampillai Thillanadarajah
- Suminda Sirisena
- Suresh Maliyadde
- Sunanda Mahendra
- Wijesinghe Arachchilage Abeysingha
