= Maheshi Ramasamy =

British-Sri Lankan scientist and professor

- Citizenship: British
- Education: Christ's College, University of Cambridge; Wadham College, Oxford
- Occupations: scientist, lecturer
- Children: 3
- Relatives: Ranjan Ramasamy (father)
- Scientific career
- Fields: Infectious Diseases
- Workplaces: University of Oxford; Oxford Vaccine Group

Maheshi N. Ramasamy (Tamil: மகேஷி என். ராமசாமி) is a British-Sri Lankan physician and lecturer. She is currently working as one of the chief investigators at the Oxford Vaccine Group.

== Biography ==
Maheshi Ramasamy was born in Sri Lanka to a Tamil father and Sinhalese mother. Her father Ranjan Ramasamy was a prominent Tamil scientist in Sri Lanka and her mother Samaranayake Ramasamy was also a renowned Sinhala scientist.

== Career ==
Maheshi commenced her medical training at the University of Melbourne in 1995 before completing her medical education in the UK. She obtained her medical degree at the Christ's College, Cambridge and became a trainee in Infectious Diseases and General Internal Medicine in London and Oxford. She also obtained the DPhil from the Wadham College, Oxford.

She is currently serving as a consultant physician at the NHS foundation trust, Oxford University and also working as an honorary senior clinical lecturer at the Magdalen College, University of Oxford.

She is currently regarded as one of the frontline scientists among the Oxford Vaccine Group in attempting to develop a vaccine to treat the patients affected by the COVID-19.

She was mentioned and accredited in one of the articles published by popular medical journal The Lancet regarding the clinical procedure of the vaccine which is currently under the development stage.
