= Christ's College Chapel Choir =

Mixed-voice choir based at Christ's College, Cambridge

Christ's College Chapel Choir is a mixed-voice choir based at Christ's College, Cambridge.

== Tours ==
The choir undertakes a major international tour each Summer. The group has visited the United States, Hong Kong, New Zealand, Canada, Australia and many European countries over the last few years. Most recently the choir toured the United States of America for a second time, entertaining audiences from Burlington, Vermont to Washington, D.C. by way of Boston Massachusetts, Newport, Rhode Island, Nantucket, Massachusetts, New York, New York and many other prominent towns en route over the course of three weeks.

== Reviews ==
The Choir has been reviewed by critics internationally. The Philadelphia Inquirer praised their "accomplished and satisfying" performance, enjoying their "particularly robust sonority", in a "living artistic experience".

== Recordings ==
- Quam Dilecta: French Romantic Choral Music (2012) Sacred music by Fauré, Saint-Saëns and others.
- Requiem – A thanksgiving for life, Choral works by Sir Philip Ledger (2010) A collection of anthems and carols by the British composer Philip Ledger alongside his Requiem – A thanksgiving for life
- Scarlatti (2009) Sacred music by father and son Alessandro and Domenico Scarlatti
- Of a Rose (2007) Carol settings by Britten and Leighton
- Stanford Magnificat for Double Chorus, Parry Songs of Farewell (2004)
- Howells Requiem, Britten Rejoice in the Lamb (2002)
- Music of the Tudors (2001) Including Tallis' Lamentations of Jeremaiah
- Sacred music by Gibbons and Purcell (2000)
- Romantic church music from Europe (1999) including music of Brahms and Fauré
- Kodály Missa Brevis, Motets by Liszt and Bruckner (1998)
- Thou knowest, Lord, the secrets of our hearts (1997) Funeral Music and Laments from 16th and 17th century England.

== Traditions ==
The choir is an institution with several interesting traditions. Although the choir has existed for more than 500 years many of these have emerged in the last 25 years. An exception is the use of red cassocks. This is an honour only open to choirs of royal foundation.
