= John Sickling =

John Sickling was a priest and academic in the late fifteenth and early sixteenth centuries.

Sicking was educated at Christ's College, Cambridge, graduating B.A. in 1482 and MA in 1485. He was Fellow of Christ's from 1485 to 1505. He was the last Master of God's House and the first of Christ's. He was Vicar of Fen Drayton from 1496. He died on 9 June 1507.
