= Philip Ledger =

English choirmaster and academic (1937–2012)

Sir Philip Stevens Ledger CBE FRSE
- Born: 12 December 1937; Bexhill-on-Sea, Sussex, England
- Died: 18 November 2012 (aged 74)

Sir Philip Stevens Ledger, CBE, FRSE (12 December 1937 – 18 November 2012) was an English classical musician, choirmaster and academic, best remembered as Director of the Choir of King's College, Cambridge from 1974 to 1982 and of the Royal Scottish Academy of Music and Drama from 1982 until he retired in 2001. He also composed choral music and played the organ, piano and harpsichord.

== Life ==
Ledger was born in Bexhill-on-Sea in 1937 and educated at King's College, Cambridge. His appointment as Master of Music at Chelmsford Cathedral in 1961 made him the youngest cathedral organist in the country. In 1965 he became Director of Music at the University of East Anglia, where he was also Dean of the School of Fine Arts and Music and responsible for establishing an award-winning building for the University's Music Centre, opened in 1973.

In 1968, Ledger became an artistic director of the Aldeburgh Festival with Benjamin Britten and Peter Pears, often conducting at the Snape Maltings, including the opening concert after its rebuilding and some first performances of works by Britten. He worked regularly with the English Chamber Orchestra during this period. He was Director of Music at King's College, Cambridge from 1974 to 1982, and conductor of the Cambridge University Musical Society from 1973 to 1982. During his Cambridge years, he directed the Choir of King's College in the Festival of Nine Lessons and Carols, made an extensive range of recordings, and took the choir to the United States, to Australia, and to Japan for the first time. Ledger then became principal of the Royal Scottish Academy of Music and Drama from 1982 to 2001.

Ledger married the soprano Mary Erryl Wells in 1963, with Robert Tear as best man at the wedding. The couple had two children.

== Compositions ==
Ledger was noted for compositions and arrangements, especially for choir. After succeeding David Willcocks as Director at King's, he wrote a number of new descants and arrangements of Christmas carols, and settings of popular texts such as "Adam lay ybounden" and "A Spotless Rose". His arrangement of "This joyful Eastertide" for mixed voices and organ has been widely performed and broadcast. Many of his works and editions were published by Oxford University Press, Encore Publications, the Lorenz Corporation (USA), and the Royal School of Church Music. His Requiem A Thanksgiving for Life is for soprano and tenor soloists with mixed choir and may be performed with an orchestra, chamber ensemble or organ.

The first recording devoted wholly to his choral works, including his Requiem, was made on 7–8 December 2008 by Christ's College Chapel Choir, Cambridge, directed by David Rowland and Ledger. An album of it was released by Regent Records on 16 November 2009.

Ledger also composed an Easter cantata with carols entitled The Risen Christ, premièred in the US at Washington National Cathedral on 7 May 2011 and in the UK at evensong in Canterbury Cathedral on 8 May 2011. In 2012, Ledger composed a further cantata, This Holy Child, which was first performed on 16 December 2012 at a morning church service at First Presbyterian Church, Regina, Saskatchewan, Canada.

== Honours ==
Philip Ledger was appointed Commander of the Order of the British Empire in the 1985 New Year Honours, and knighted in the 1999 Birthday Honours for services to music. He received honorary doctorates from the universities of Strathclyde, Central England, Glasgow and St Andrews, and from the Royal Scottish Academy of Music and Drama. He was President of the Royal College of Organists in 1992–1994 and of the Incorporated Society of Musicians in 1994–1995, and a patron of Bampton Classical Opera. He was awarded a fellowship by the Royal Northern College of Music in 1989. Ledger was a Fellow of the Royal Society of Edinburgh (FRSE).

| Preceded by Derrick Cantrell | Director of Music at Chelmsford Cathedral; 1962–1965 | Succeeded by John Jordan |
| Preceded by Sir David Willcocks | Director of Music, King's College, Cambridge; 1974–1982 | Succeeded by Stephen Cleobury |
