= Christ's College, Cambridge =

College of the University of Cambridge

Christ's College
- University of Cambridge
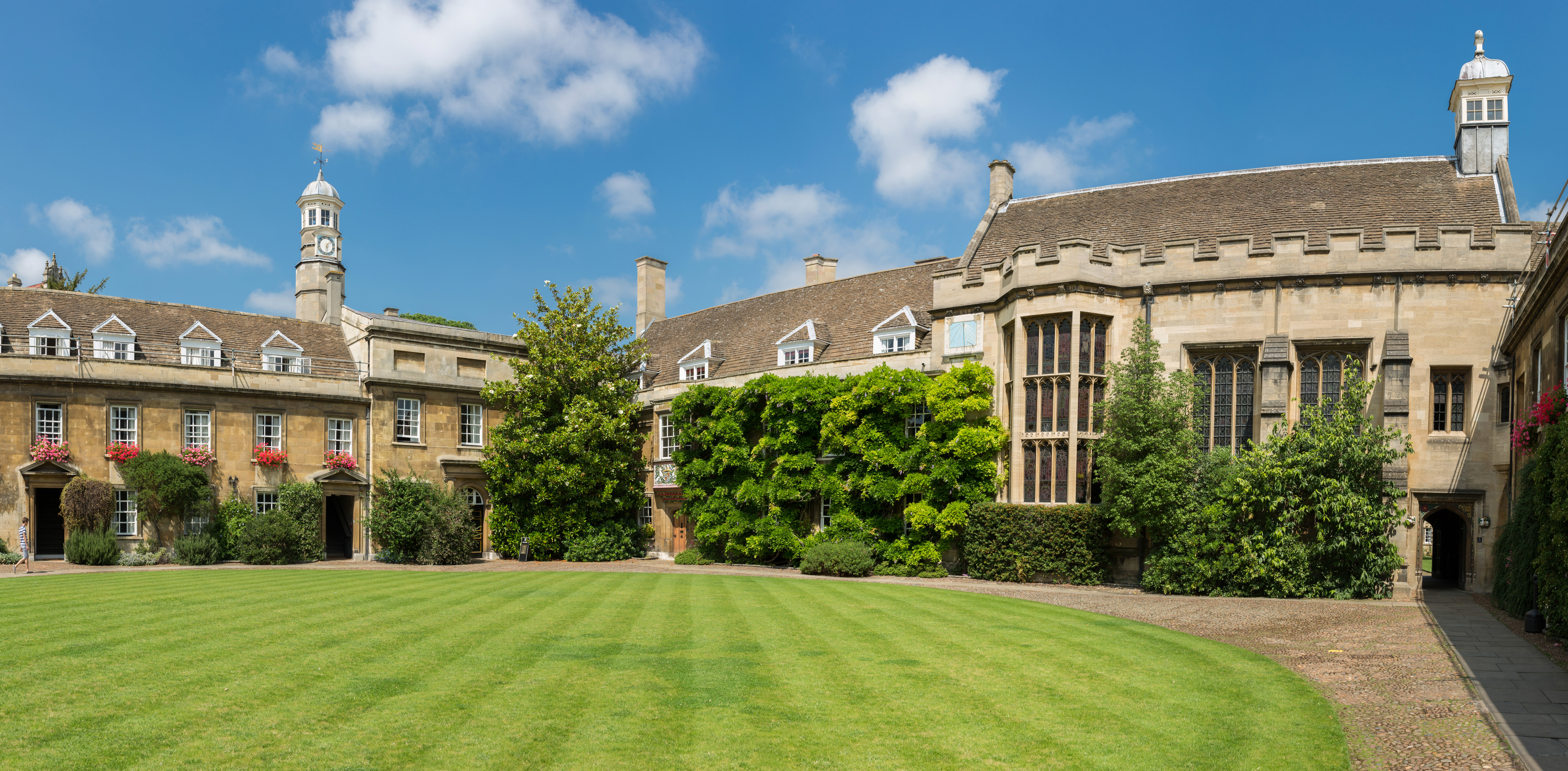
- First Court, Christ's College

- Arms of Christ's College, being the arms of the founder Lady Margaret Beaufort; Arms: Royal arms of England a bordure componée azure and argent
Scarf colours: brown, with two equally-spaced narrow white stripes
- Location: St Andrew's Street (map)
- Coordinates: 52.2063°N 0.1224°E
- Abbreviation: CHR
- Motto: Souvent me Souvient (Old French)
- Motto in English: I often remember / Remember me often
- Founders: William Byngham (1437); Henry VI (nominal, 1448)
- Established: 1437; 589 years ago (refounded 1505)
- Named after: Jesus Christ
- Former names: God's House (1437–1505)
- Sister colleges: Wadham College, Oxford; Branford College, Yale; Adams House, Harvard
- Master: Simon McDonald
- Undergraduates: 459 (2022–23)
- Postgraduates: 265 (2022–23)
- Endowment: £122m (2022)
- Visitor: Chancellors of the University ex officio
- Website: christs.cam.ac.uk
- JCR: thejcr.co.uk
- MCR: christsmcr.co.uk
- Boat club: Christ's College Boat Club

Map
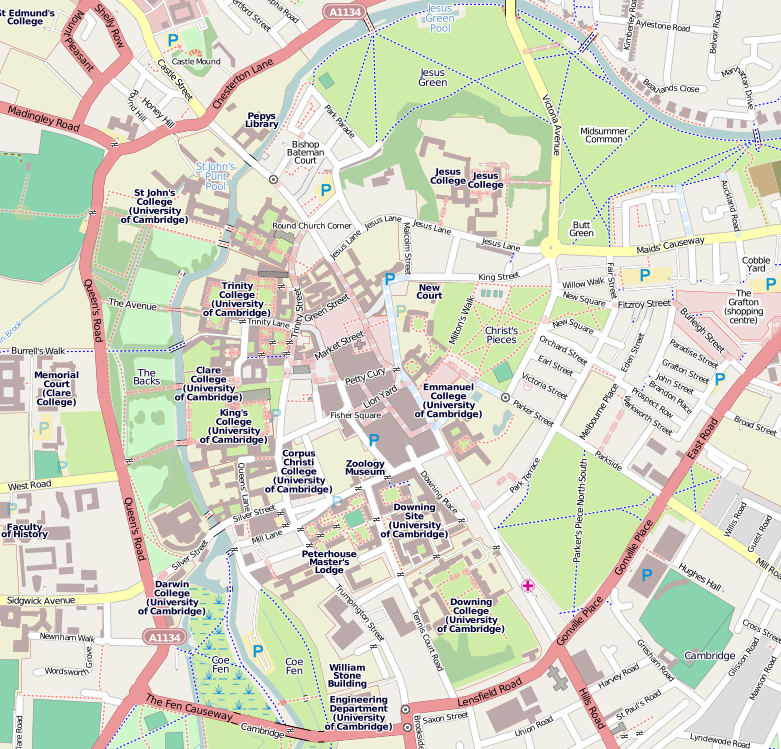
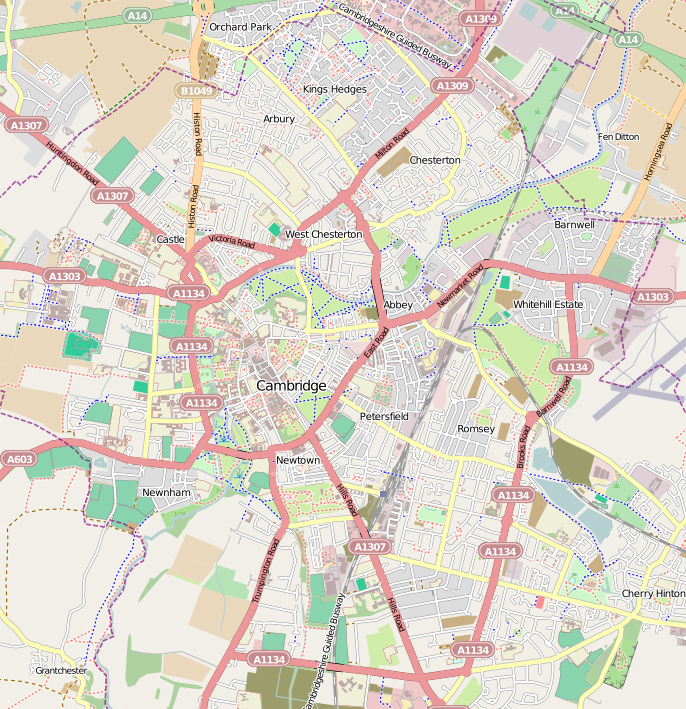
- Location within Central Cambridge Location within Cambridge

Christ's College is a constituent college of the University of Cambridge, England. The college includes the master, the fellows of the college, and about 450 undergraduate and 250 graduate students. The college was founded by William Byngham in 1437 as God's House. In 1505, the college was granted a new royal charter, was given a substantial endowment by Lady Margaret Beaufort, and changed its name to Christ's College, becoming the twelfth of the Cambridge colleges to be founded in its modern form.

Alumni of the college include the poet John Milton, the naturalist Charles Darwin, as well as the Nobel Laureates Martin Evans, James Meade, Alexander Todd, Duncan Haldane, and John Clarke. The Master is Lord McDonald of Salford.

== History ==
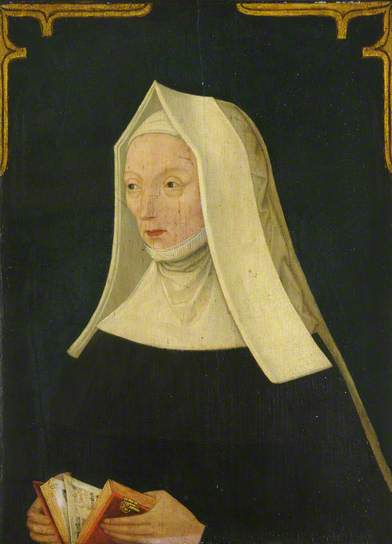
Lady Margaret Beaufort, Christ's College Library

Christ's College was founded by William Byngham in 1437 as God's House, on land which was soon after sold to enable the enlargement of King's College. Byngham obtained the first royal licence for God's House in July 1439. The college was founded to provide for the lack of grammar-school masters in England at the time, and the college has been described as "the first secondary-school training college on record". The original site of God’s House was surrendered in 1443 to King's College. About three-quarters of King's College Chapel stands on the original site of God's House.

After the original royal licence of 1439, three more licences, two in 1442 and one in 1446, were granted before in 1448 God's House received the charter upon which the college was in fact founded. In this charter, King Henry VI was named as the founder, and in the same year the college moved to its modern site.

In 1505, the college was endowed by Lady Margaret Beaufort, mother of King Henry VII, and was given the name Christ's College, perhaps at the suggestion of her confessor, the bishop John Fisher. The expansion in the population of the college in the 17th century led to the building, in the 1640s, of the Fellows' Building in what is now Second Court.

== Buildings ==
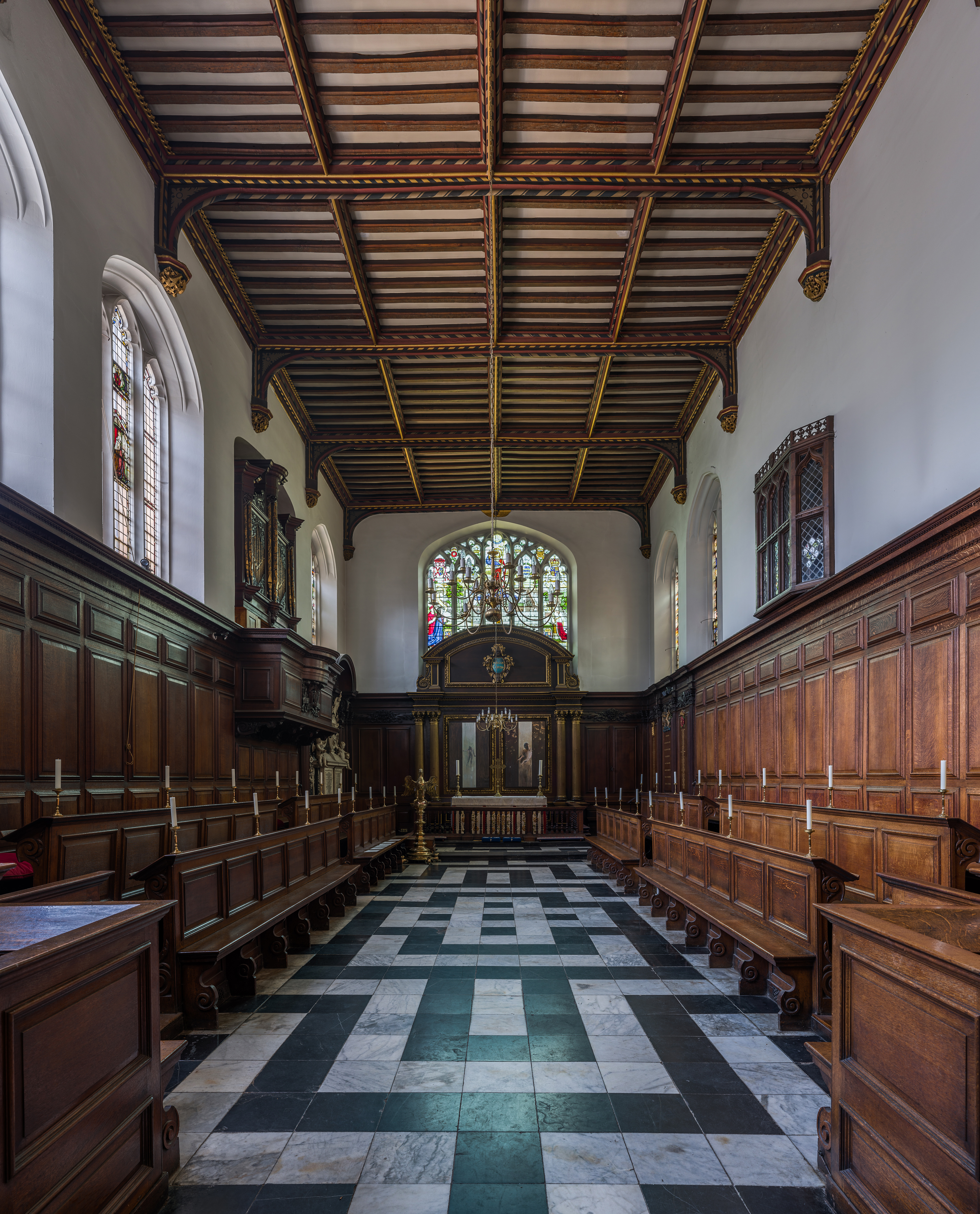
The chapel, with a viewing window from the Master's Lodge

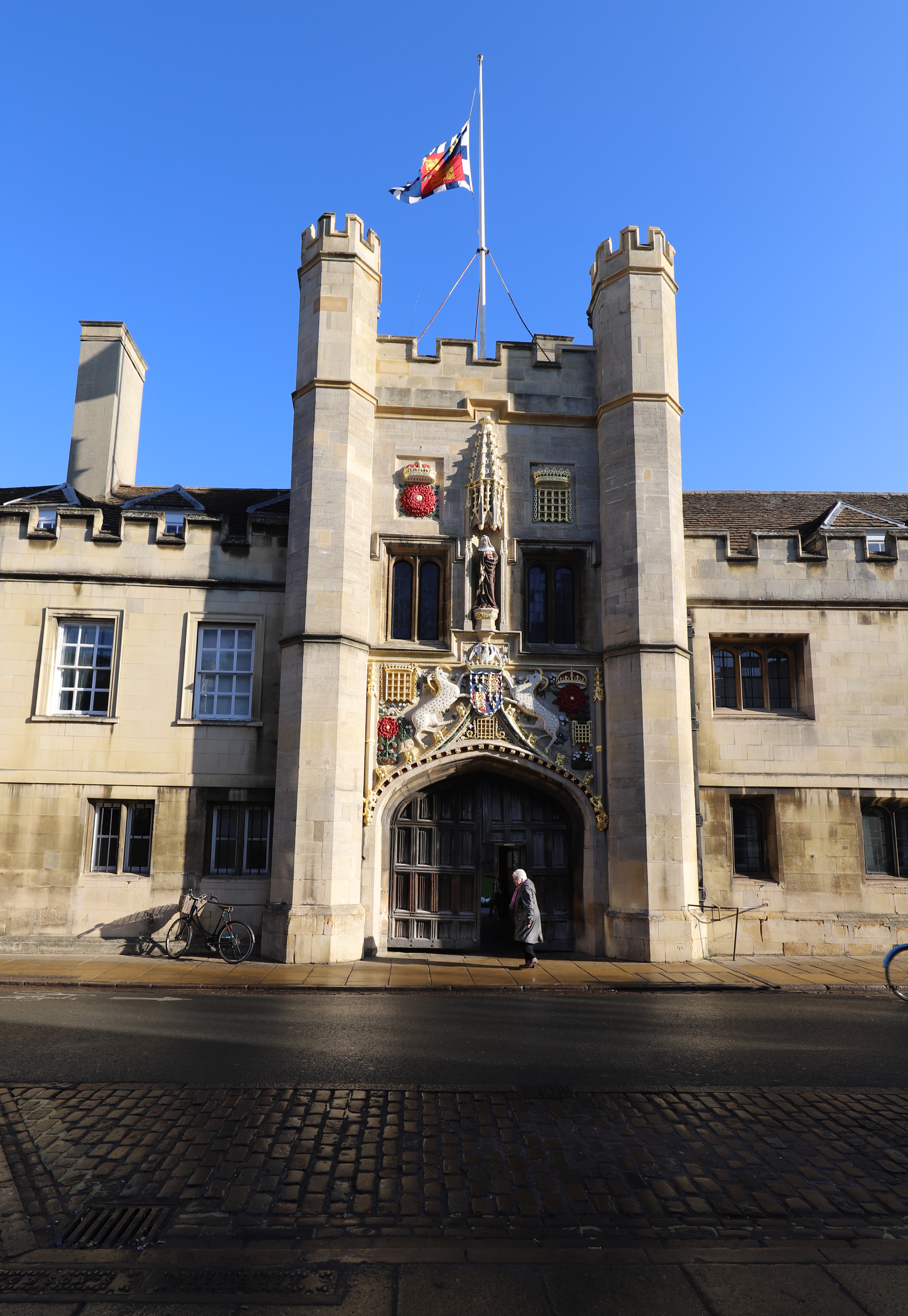
The Great Gate of Christ's College

The original 15th/16th-century college buildings now form part of First Court, including the chapel, Master's Lodge and Great Gate tower. The gate itself is disproportionate: the bottom has been cut off to accommodate a rise in street level, which can be seen in the steps leading down to the foot of L staircase in the gate tower. The college hall was built at the start of the 16th century, and restored in 1875–1879 by George Gilbert Scott the younger. The lawn of First Court is famously round, and a wisteria sprawls up the front of the Master's lodge.

Second Court is fully built up on only three sides, one of which is formed by the 1640s Fellows' Building. The fourth side backs onto the Master's garden.

The Stevenson Building in Third Court was designed by J. J. Stevenson in the 1880s and was extended in 1905 as part of the College's Quadcentenary. In 1947 Professor Albert Richardson designed a new cupola for the Stevenson building, and a second building, the neo-Georgian Chancellor's Building (W staircase, now known as the Blyth Building), completed in 1950. Third Court's Memorial Building (Y staircase), a twin of the Chancellor's building, also by Richardson, was completed in 1953 at a cost of £80,000. Third Court is also noted for its display of irises in May and June, a gift to the college in 1946.

The controversial tiered concrete New Court (often dubbed "the Typewriter") was designed in the Modernist style by Sir Denys Lasdun in 1966–70, and was described as "superb" in Lasdun's obituary in the Guardian. Design critic Hugh Pearman comments "Lasdun had big trouble relating to the street at the overhanging rear". It appears distinctively in aerial photographs, forming part of the northern boundary of the college.

An assortment of neighbouring buildings have been absorbed into the college, of which the most notable is the Todd Building, previously Cambridge's County Hall.

Through an arch in the Fellows' Building is the Fellows' Garden. It includes two mulberry trees, of which the older was planted in 1608, the same year as Milton's birth. Both trees have toppled sideways, the younger tree in the Great Storm of 1987, and are now earthed up round the trunks, but continue to fruit every year.

=== Swimming pool ===
Christ's College is one of only five colleges in Oxford or Cambridge to have its own swimming pool. It is fed by water from Hobson's Conduit. Recently refurbished, it is now known as the 'Malcolm Bowie Bathing Pool', and is thought to be the oldest outdoor swimming pool in the UK, dating from the mid 17th century. The other four swimming pools within colleges belong to Girton College (indoor pool), Corpus Christi College (outdoor pool), Emmanuel College (outdoor pool) and Clare Hall (indoor pool).

=== Gallery ===
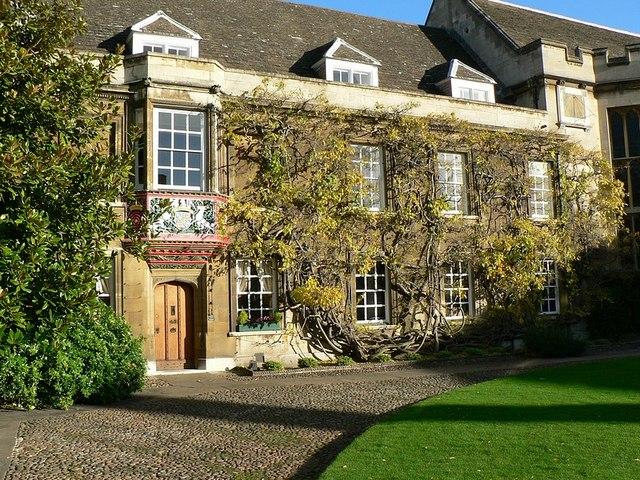
Master's Lodge, First Court

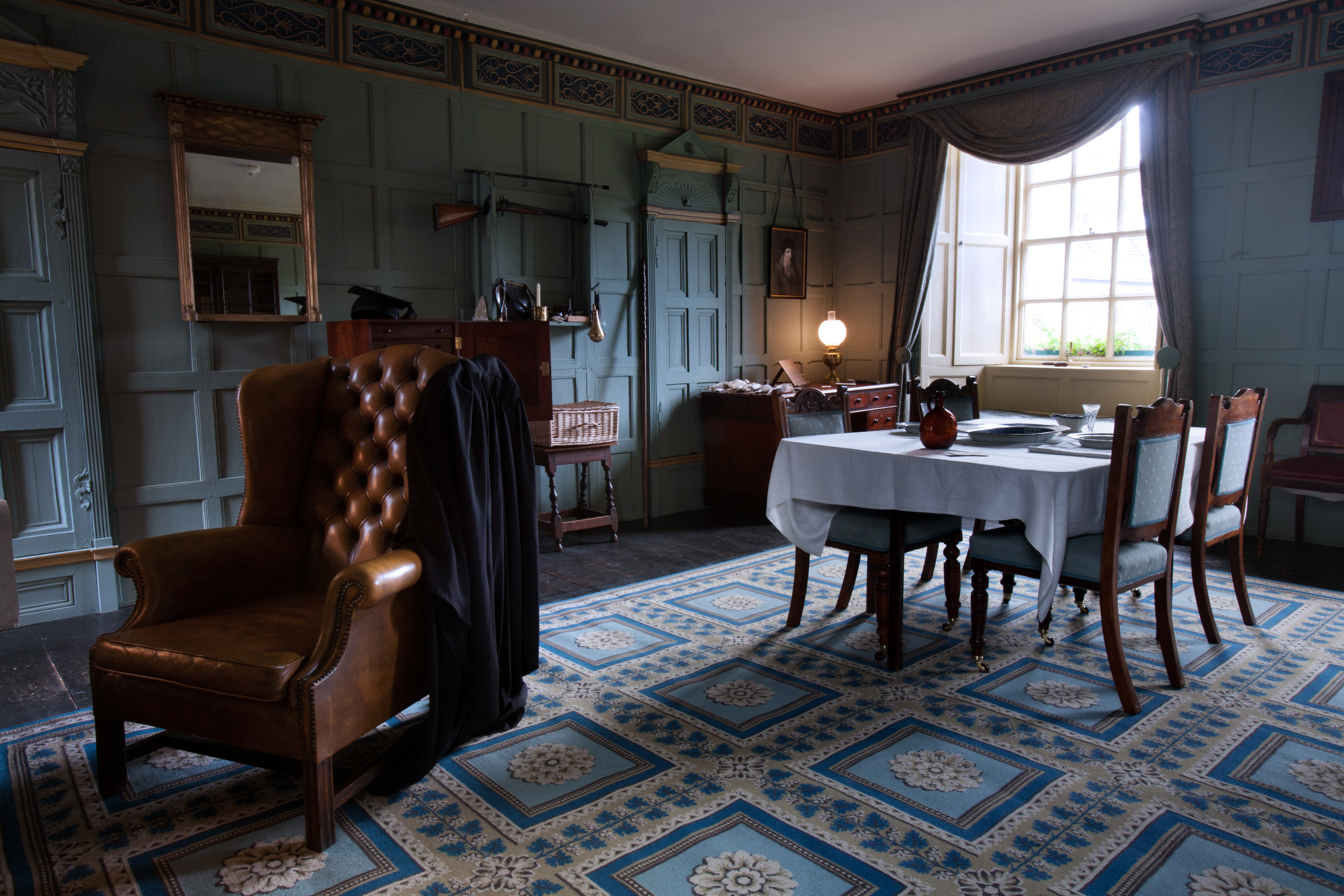
Charles Darwin's Rooms, First Court

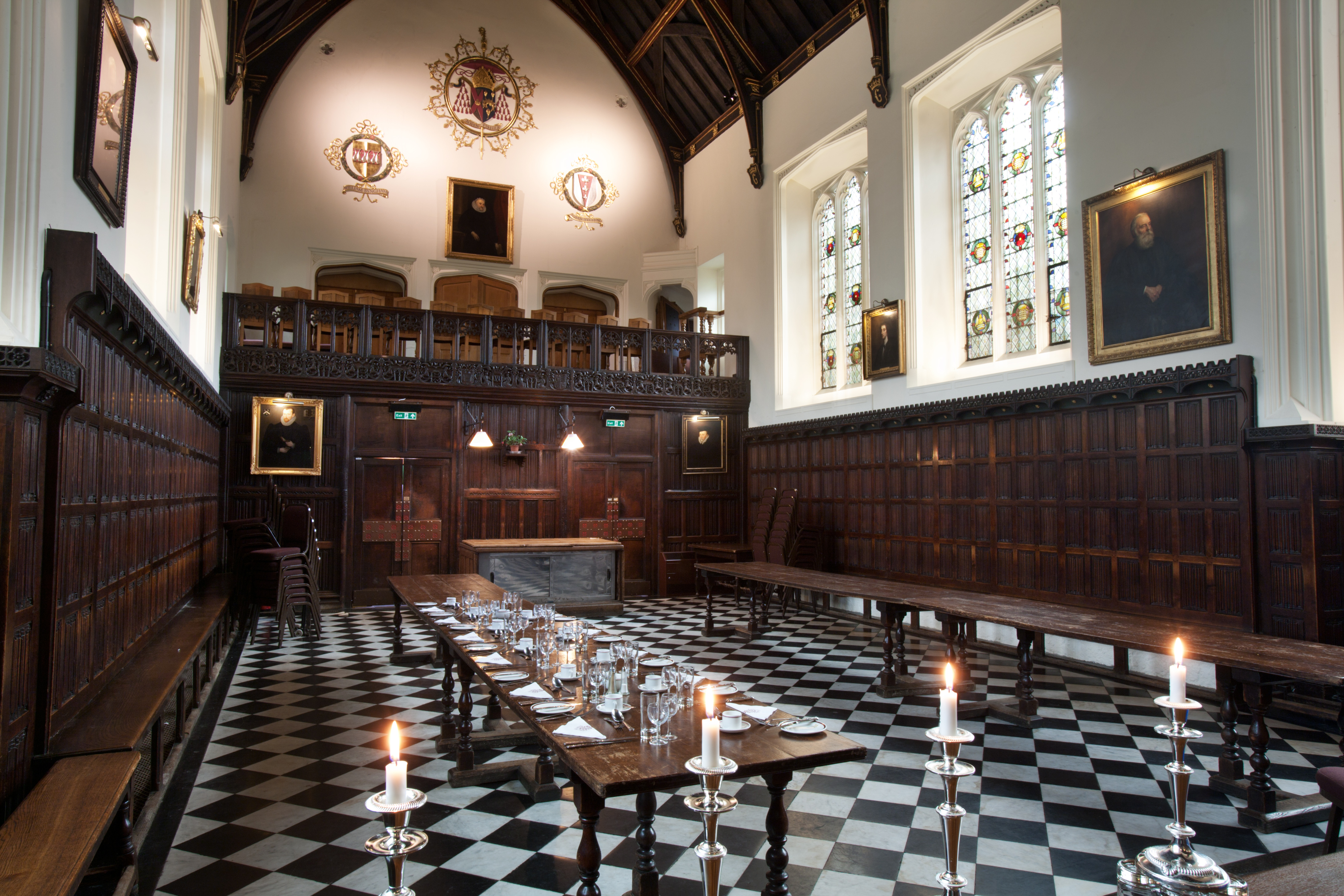
Christ's College Cambridge, Dining Hall, Back

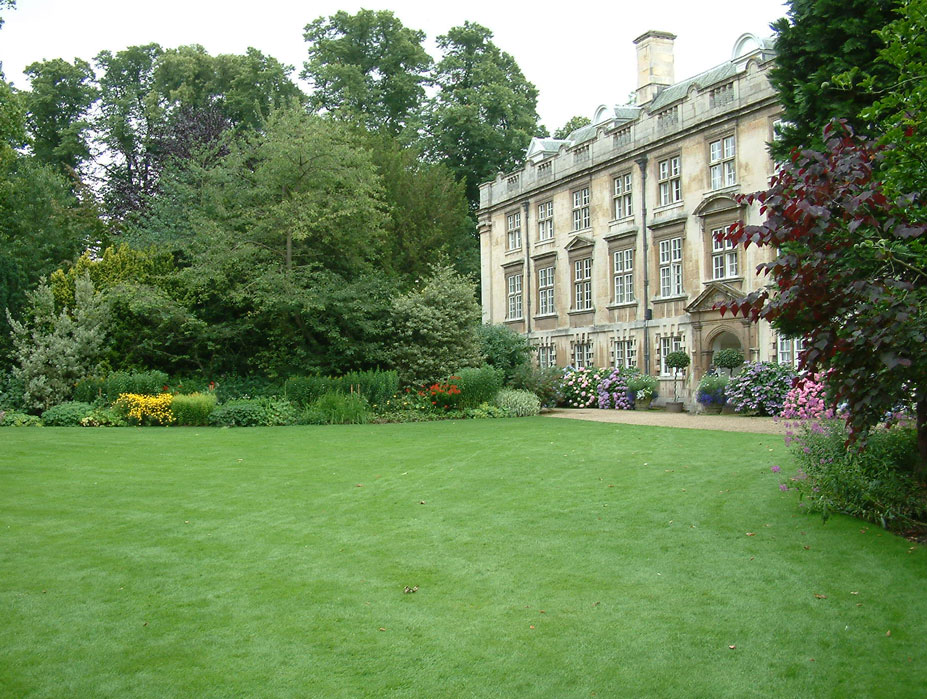
Fellows' Garden, showing rear of Fellows' Building

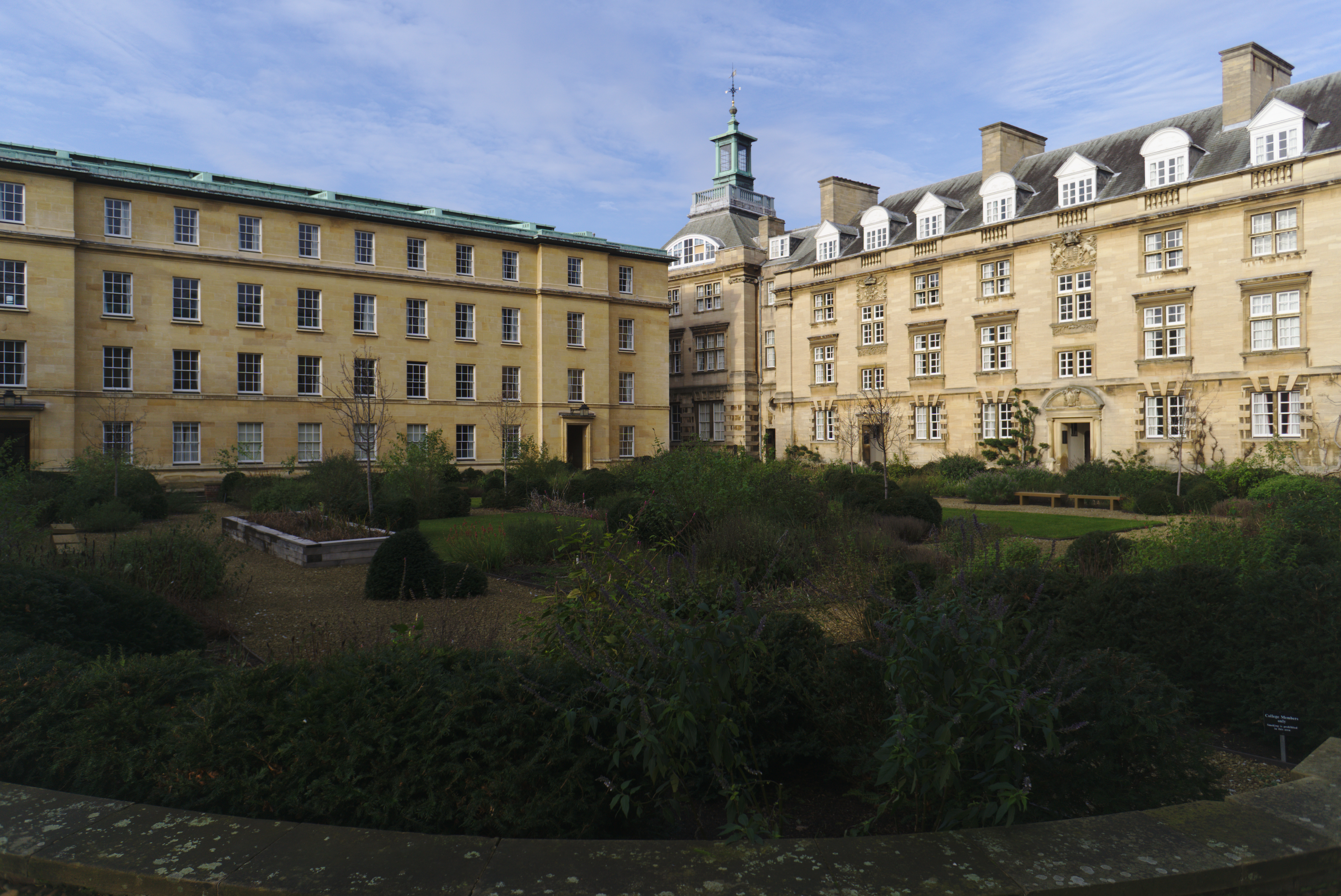
Third Court: Memorial and Stevenson Buildings

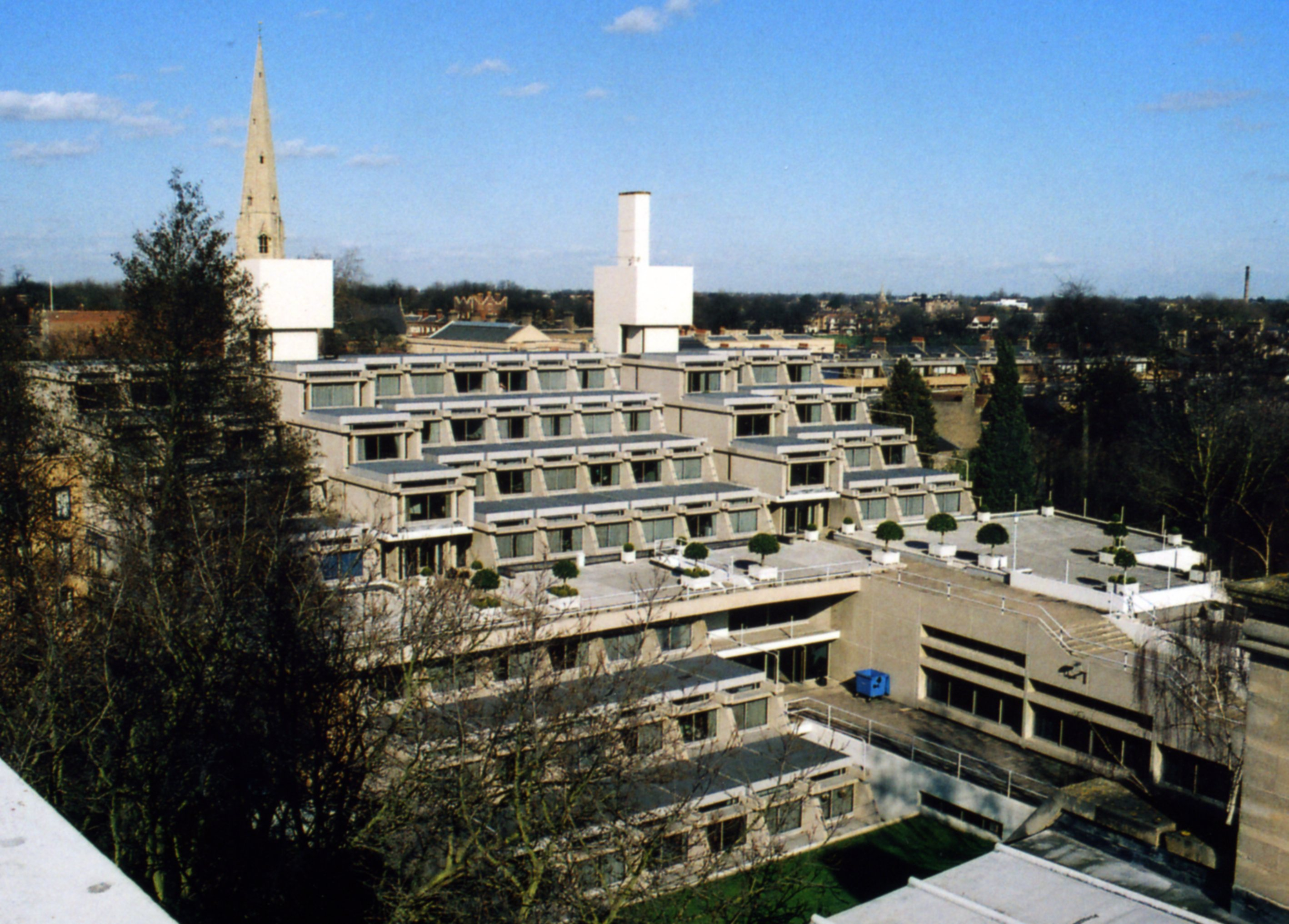
New Court: Lasdun Building, known as "The Typewriter"

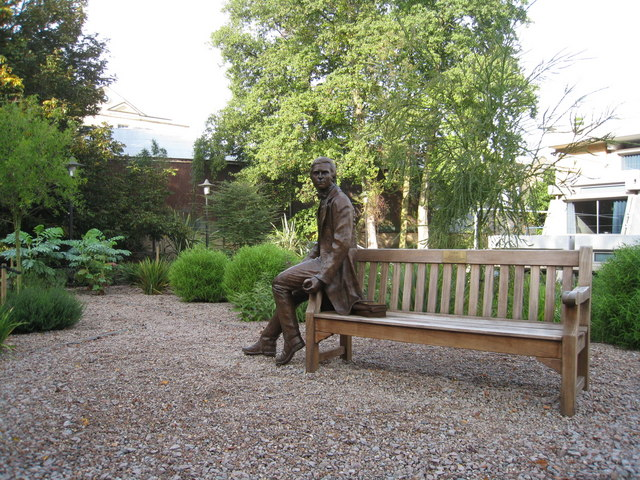
Darwin Garden, New Court, w. Darwin statue by Anthony Smith

=== Plan of College ===
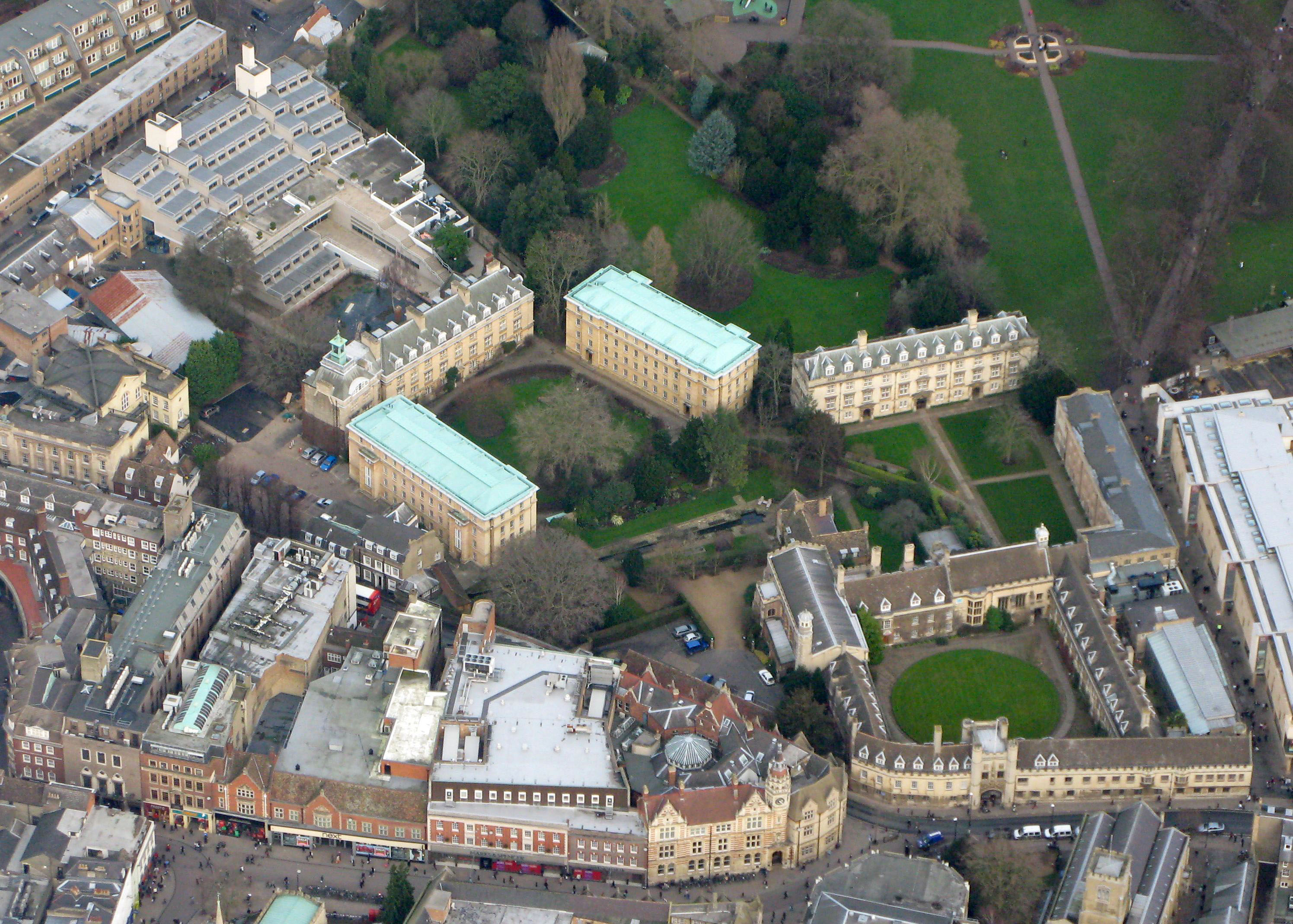
Christ's College, Cambridge, from above in 2009

1	Great Gate
2	First Court
3	Chapel
4	Master's Lodge
5	Hall
6	Library

7	Second Court
8	Fellows' Building
9	Third Court
10	Memorial Building
11	Stevenson Building
12	Blyth Building

13	Todd Building
14	Four Staircase
15	New Court (Yusuf Hamied Centre)
16	Fellows' Garden

== Academic profile ==
With a reputation even within Cambridge for the highest academic standards, Christ's came first in the Tompkins Table's twentieth anniversary aggregate table, and between 2001 and 2007, it had a mean position of third. Academic excellence continues at Christ's, with 91% of students in 2013 gaining a first class degree or an upper second (II.i). This is significantly higher than the university average of 70%.

Christ's is noted for educating two of Cambridge's most famous alumni, the poet John Milton and the naturalist Charles Darwin, who, during the celebrations for the 800th anniversary of the university, were both placed at the foreground as two of the four most iconic individuals in the university's history. The college has also educated Nobel Laureates including Martin Evans, James Meade, Alexander Todd and Duncan Haldane. It is the University's 6th largest producer of Nobel Prize winners.

Some of the college's other famous alumni include former archbishop of Canterbury Rowan Williams; theologian William Paley; historian Simon Schama; South African prime minister Jan Smuts; Lord Mountbatten; medical doctor, scientist and diplomat Davidson Nicol; and comedians John Oliver, Sacha Baron Cohen and Andy Parsons.

== Student life ==
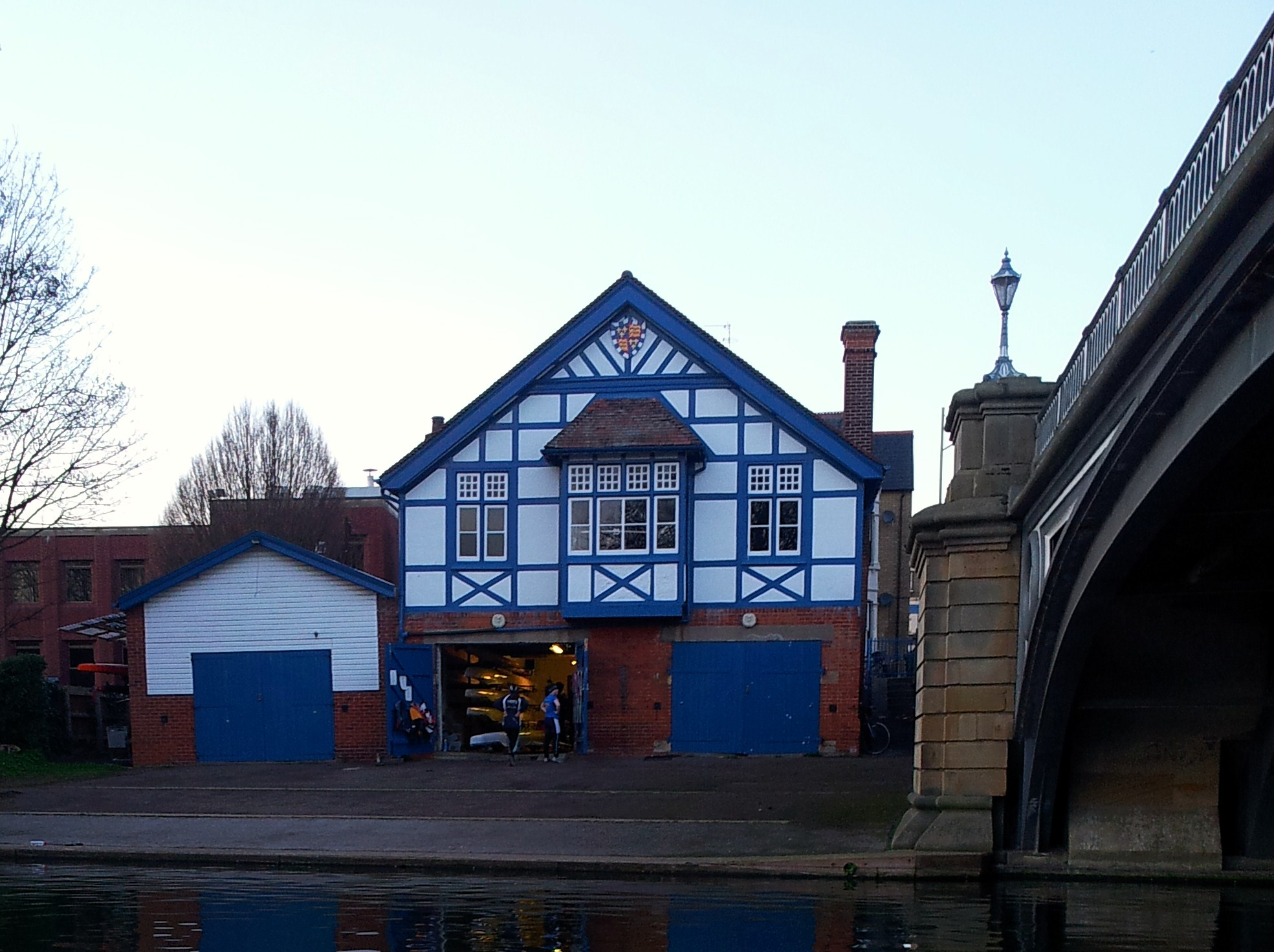
Christ's College Boat Club's boathouse on the River Cam

The Junior Combination Room (JCR) represents the undergraduate students. It organises social and welfare events, and negotiates on the students' behalf on important issues. The JCR has a standing committee and a common room for all the students. The JCR's counterpart, the Middle Combination Room (MCR), represents the graduate students of the college, and has its own bar. The MCR organises regular Graduate Halls. A Garden Party is held by both the JCR and the MCR every June in the Fellows' Garden. The Senior Combination Room (SCR) is composed solely of fellows of the college and holds two feasts each year.

The chaplain of the college is Dr Helen Orchard.

Other societies at Christ's include:

- The Marguerites Club, one of the oldest surviving College societies, reformed in 1899 by Gilbert Jessop the then captain of CUCC. It is believed to have originally formed some ten years earlier, but was soon disbanded. Originally the society was confined to captains and secretaries or those with colours in three sports. The club continues to exist to recognise sporting excellence within the college. The name originated from the club's original blazer, which was navy blue in colour with the Foundress's 'rebus' or badge, signifying her name, embroidered on the pocket.
- Christ's College Boat Club, the oldest college sports club still active, having been founded in 1830. Like many other Cambridge Colleges, Christ's has its own boathouse on the banks of the Cam.
- Christ's College Rugby Football Club, founded in 1875 by Alfred Cort Haddon, who is considered the father of modern anthropology. In the 1960 Varsity Match, eight of the starting Cambridge team were students at Christ's and all of the side's points were scored by Christ's players. The CCRFC is nicknamed "The Brown Rings" after the brown and white hoops featured on the match kit.
- Christ's College Association Football Club, which prides itself on having won the inter-collegiate Cuppers competition more times than any other.
- Christ's College Literary Society, which organises student publication at Christ's, open-mic events, workshops and a weekly poetry discussion group.
- Christ's Films, which uses the theatre to screen new films weekly
- Christ's Amateur Dramatic Society
- Christ's College Medical Society
- Christ's Politics Society
- Christ's College Music Society, founded 1710.
- Christ's College Chapel Choir

=== May ball ===
Christ's, like most other Cambridge Colleges, also hosts a biennial May Ball in the time after undergraduate examinations which is by students commonly known as May Week. A separate society called "Christ's College May Ball Committee" is set up every two years to organise and direct this event. The 2010 May Ball, named "L'Esprit Nouveau", was held on 15 June 2010 and featured a 1920s Parisian theme; Two Door Cinema Club headlined the entertainment. The May Ball in June 2012 featured a Rio de Janeiro carnival theme. Other previous themes include "Le Reve" in 2002, "Silhouette" in 2004, "Elysium" in 2006 and "The Jasmine Ball" in 2008. The May Ball on 17 June 2014 was hailed as one of the best May Balls of the year. It was themed "The Emerald City". The May Ball in 2016 was themed as Biophilia. In 2018, the theme was "A Night's Tale". While the 2020 Ball was cancelled owing to the COVID-19 pandemic, the May Ball returned in 2022, themed as "Mythos". The 2024 May Ball was themed after the William Shakespeare play A Midsummer Night's Dream.

== Grace ==
The College Grace is normally said before any dinner held in the Formal Hall of the college. Though the student body rises for the recitation of the Grace, Christ's is one of the only colleges in Cambridge where the students do not rise when the fellows enter and leave the dining hall. This is said to be the result of a historical conflict between the students and fellows at Christ's, who were on opposite sides during the English Civil War. The words of the Grace are:

Latin	English
Exhilarator omnium Christe Sine quo nihil suave, nihil jucundum est: Benedic, quaesumus, cibo et potui servorum tuorum, Quae jam ad alimoniam corporis apparavisti; et concede ut istis muneribus tuis ad laudem tuam utamur gratisque animis fruamur; utque quemadmodum corpus nostrum cibis corporalibus fovetur, ita mens nostra spirituali verbi tui nutrimento pascatur Per te Dominum nostrum, Amen.	Christ, the gladdener of all, Without whom nothing is sweet, nothing pleasant: Bless, we beseech you, the food and drink of your servants, Which you have now provided for the nourishment of the body; And grant that we may use these gifts of yours for your praise, And enjoy them with grateful minds; And that, just as our body is nourished by bodily foods, So our mind may feed on the spiritual nourishment of your Word. Through you, our Lord, Amen.

== Notable people ==
=== Proctors of God's House ===
- 1439–1451 William Byngham
- 1451–1458 John Hurt
- 1458–1464 William Fallan
- 1464–1477 William Basset
- 1477–1490 Ralph Barton
- 1490–1505 John Sickling

=== Notable alumni ===
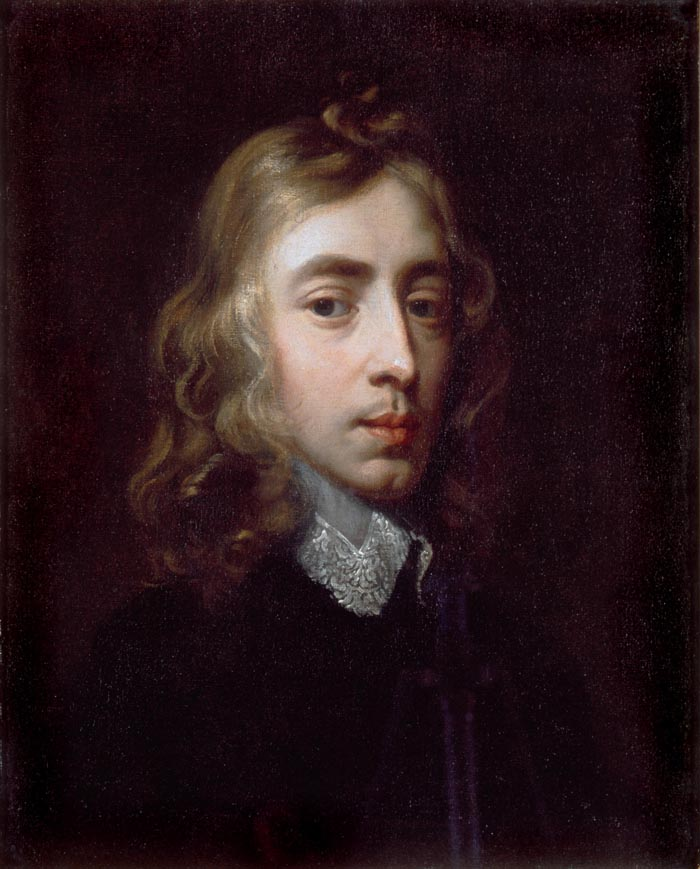
John Milton

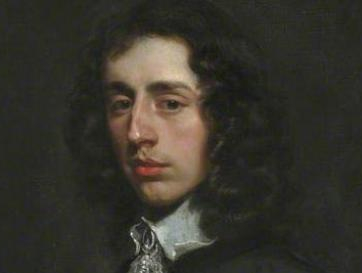
Sir John Finch

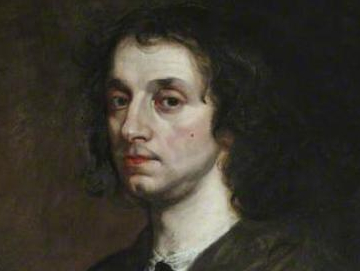
Sir Thomas Baines

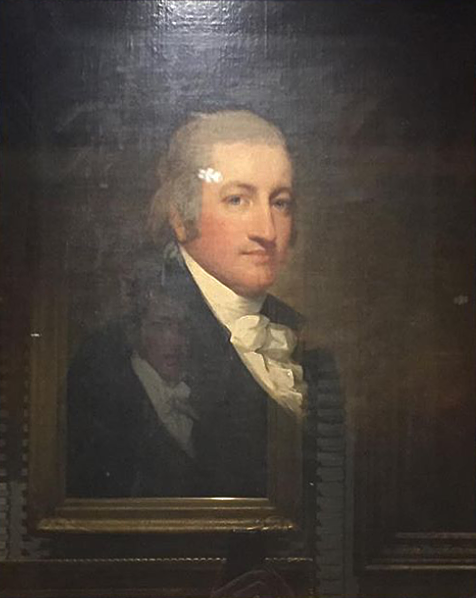
John Tayloe III

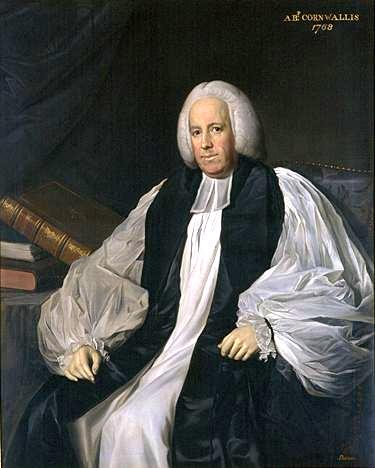
Frederick Cornwallis

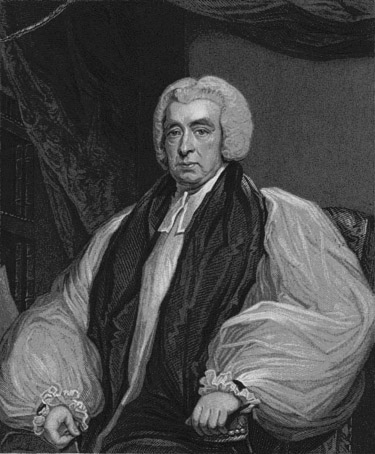
Beilby Porteus

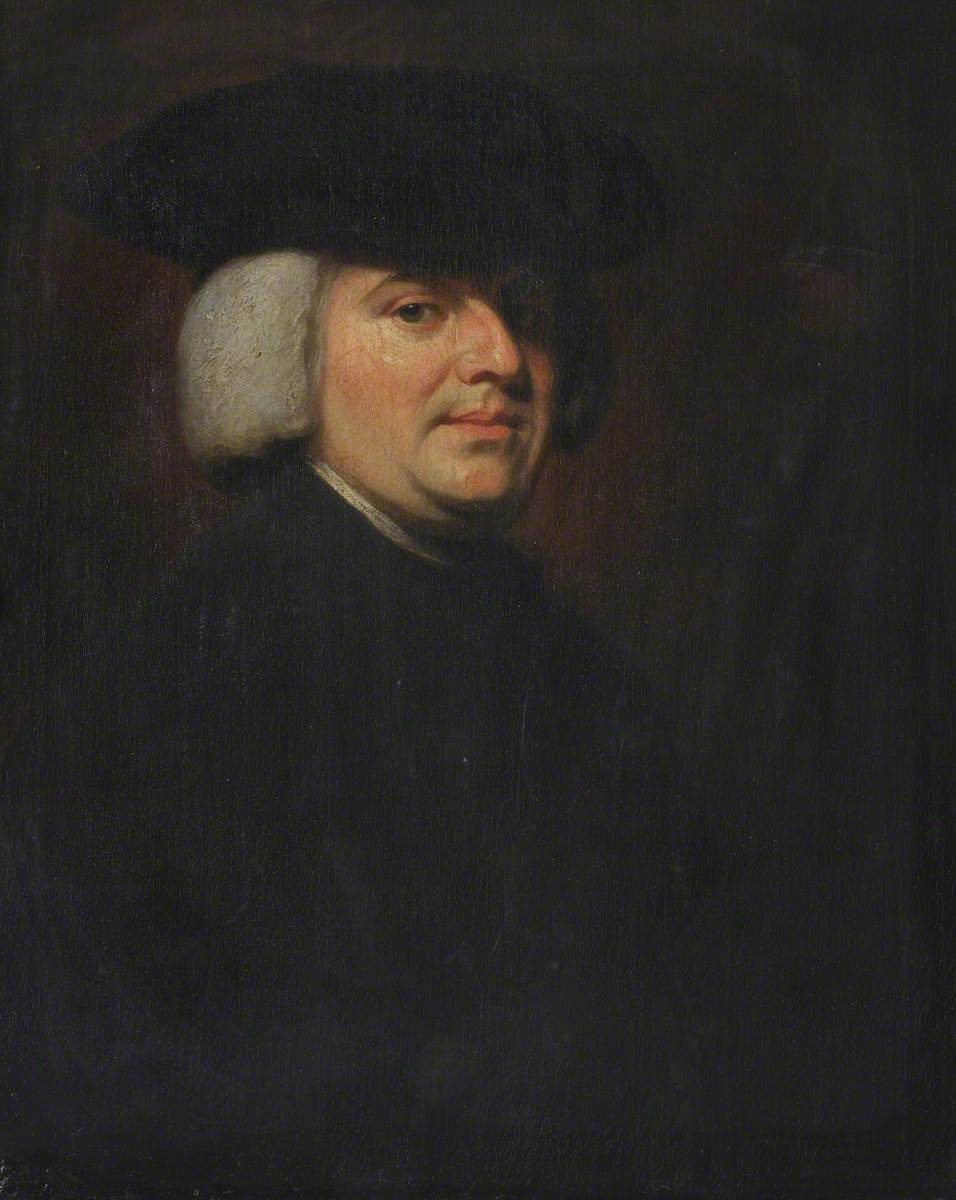
William Paley

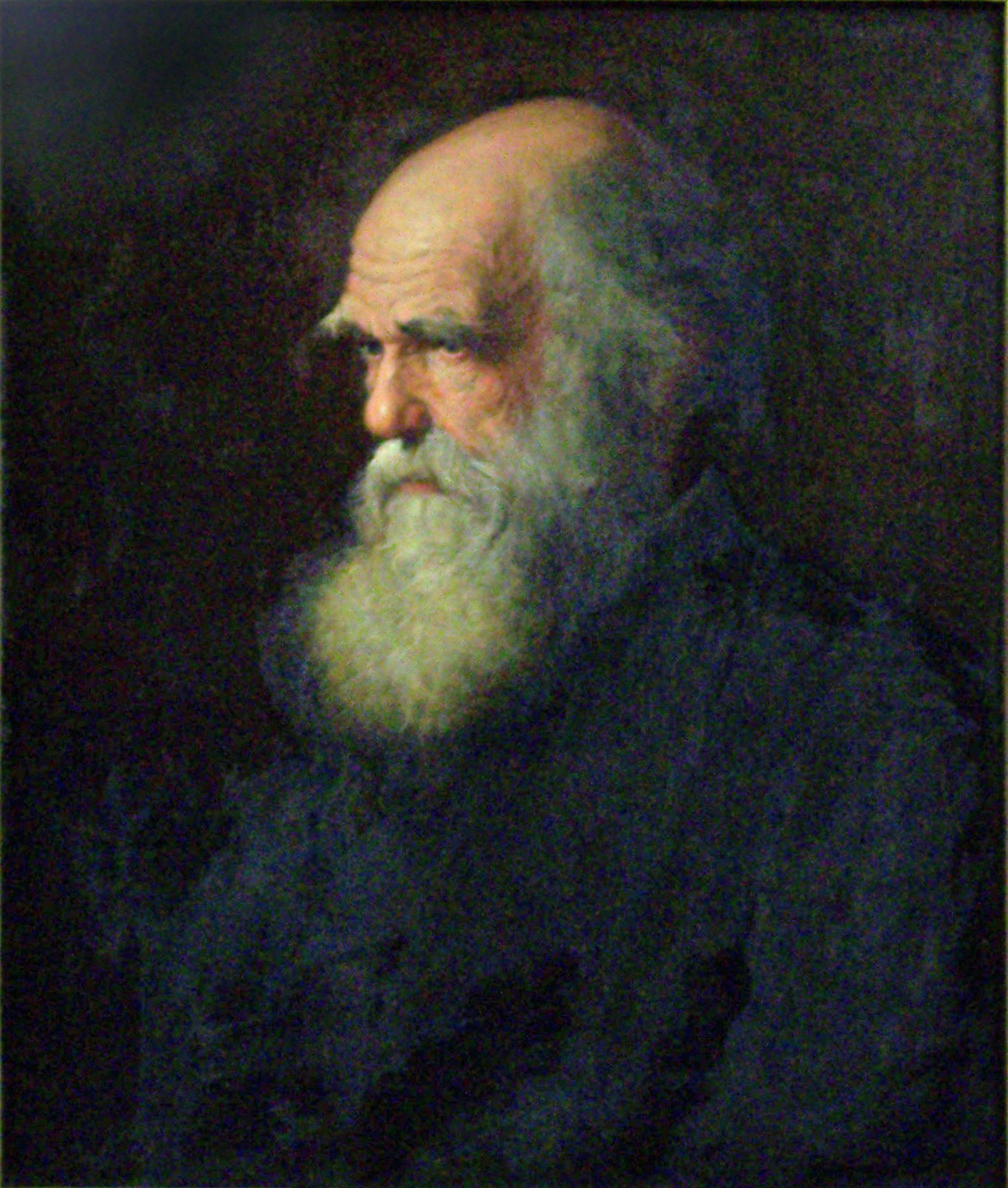
Charles Darwin

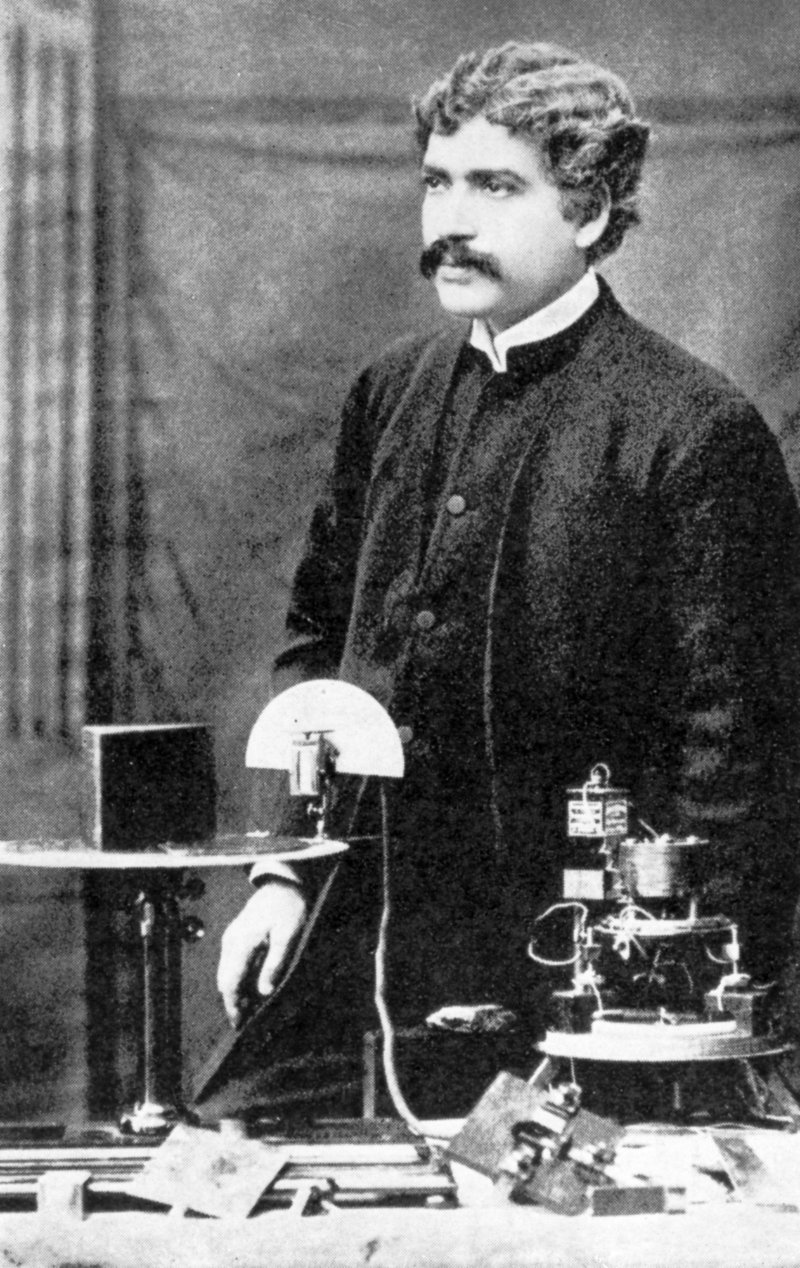
Jagdish Chandra Bose

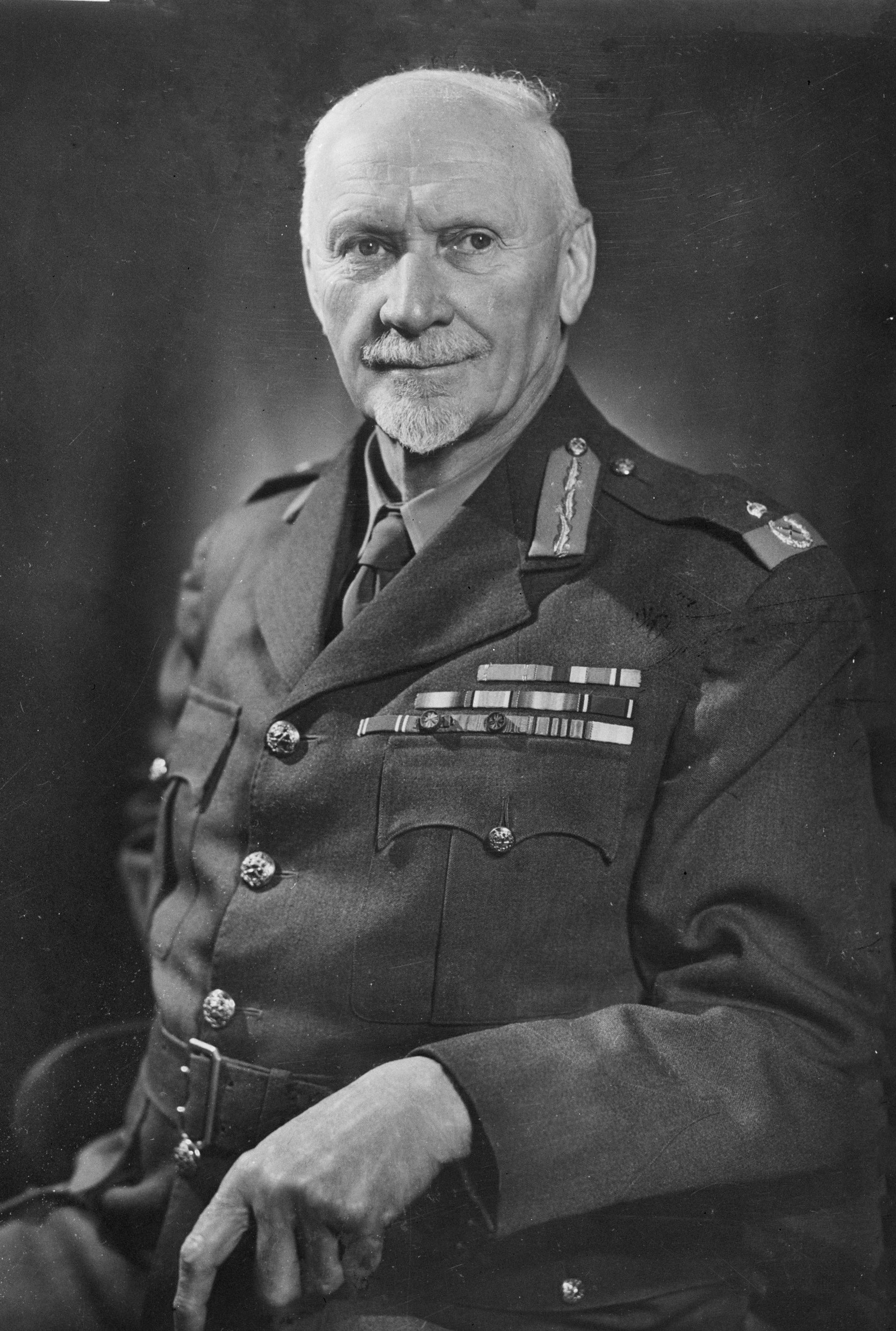
Jan Smuts

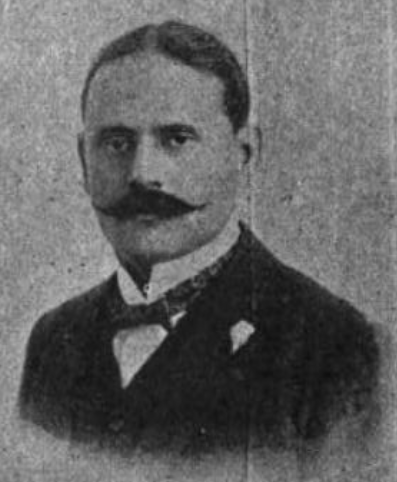
Shaikh Shahid Husain

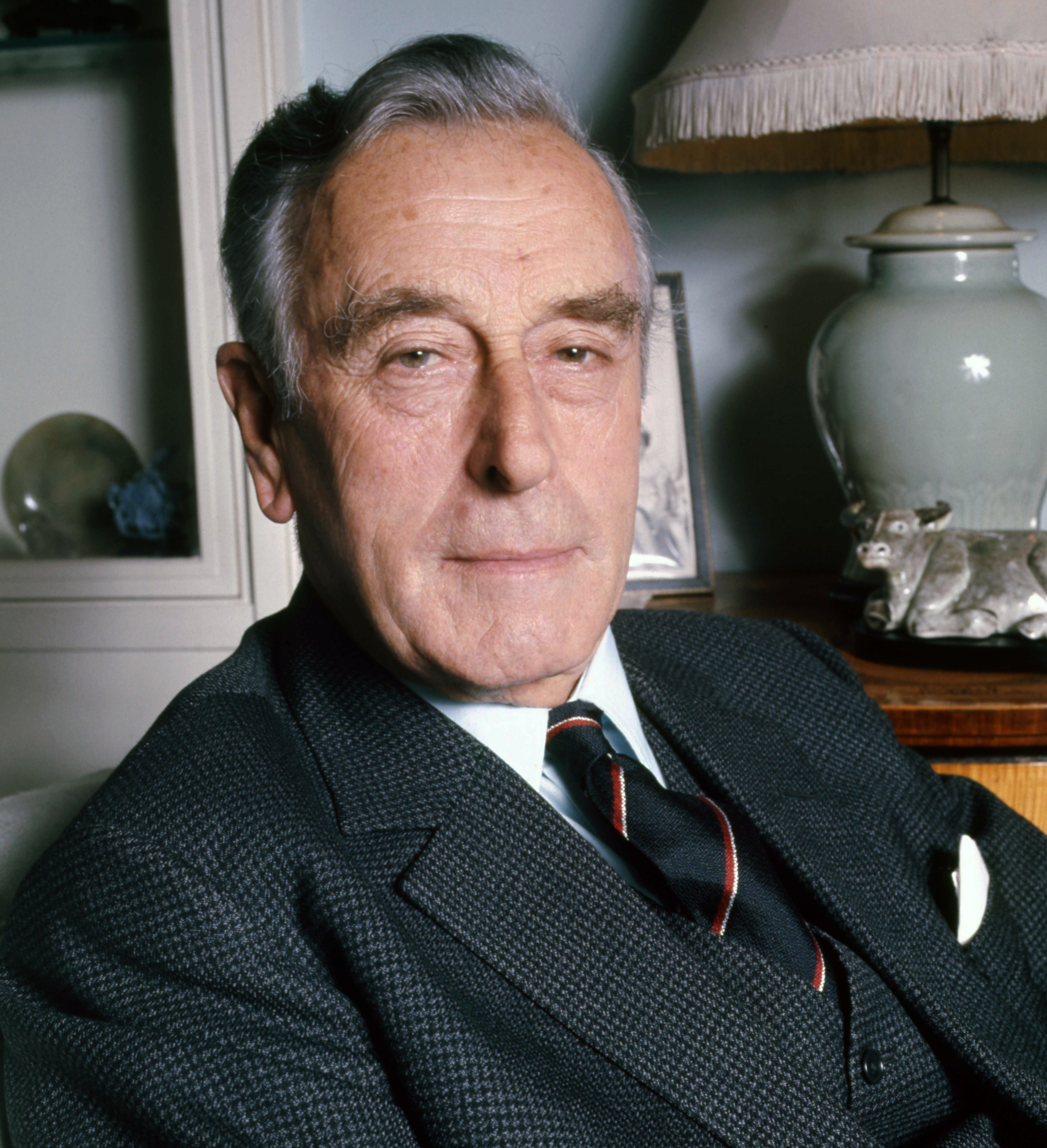
Lord Mountbatten of Burma

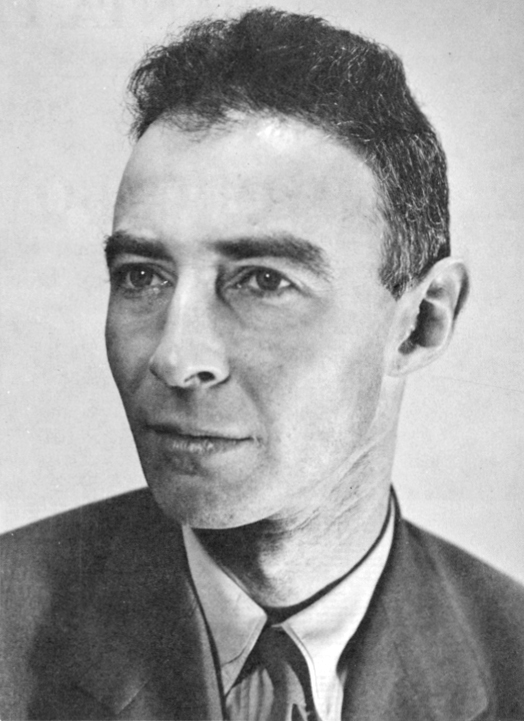
J. Robert Oppenheimer

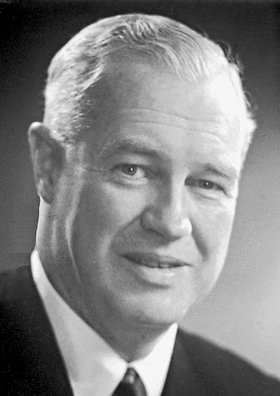
Lord Todd

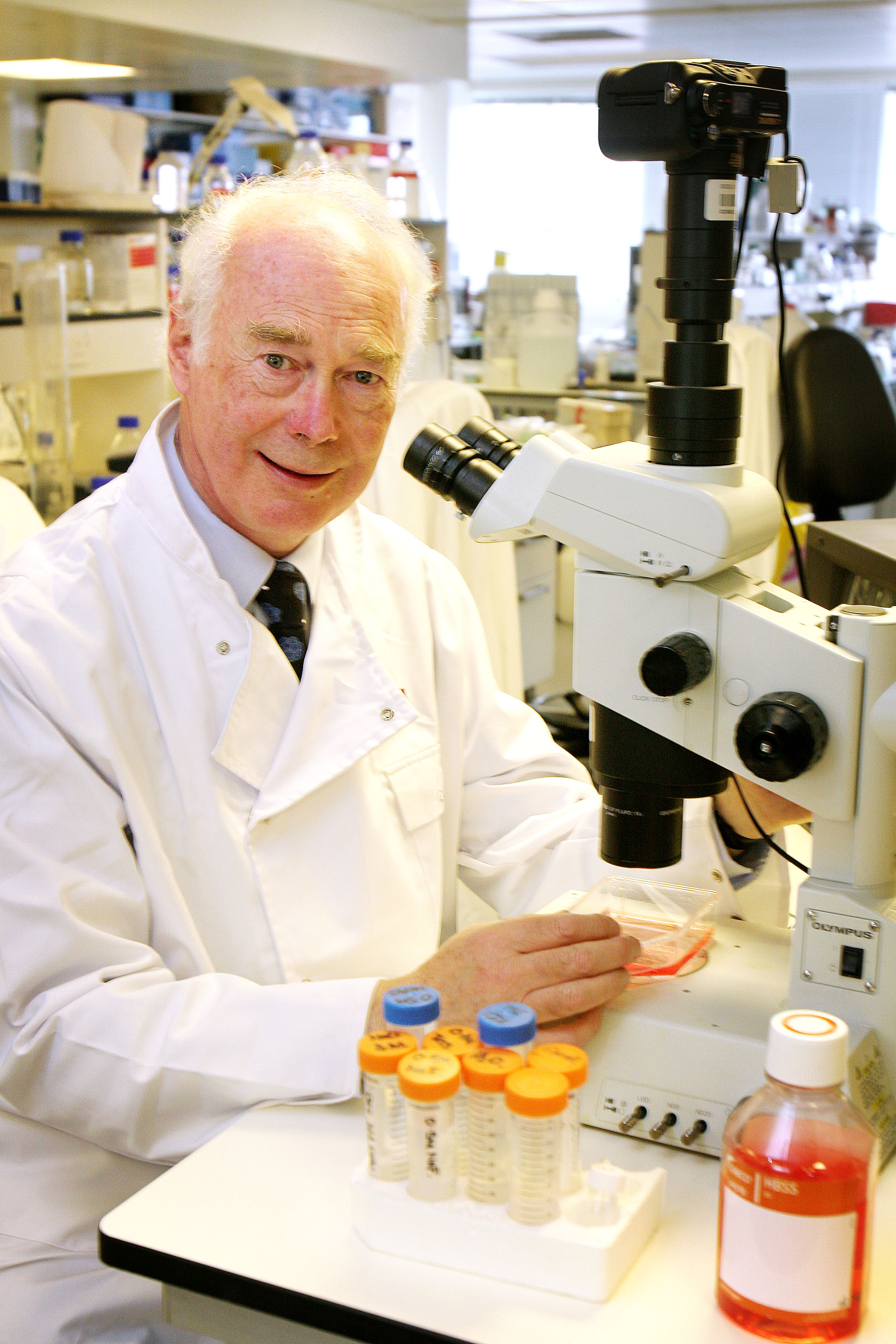
Sir Martin Evans

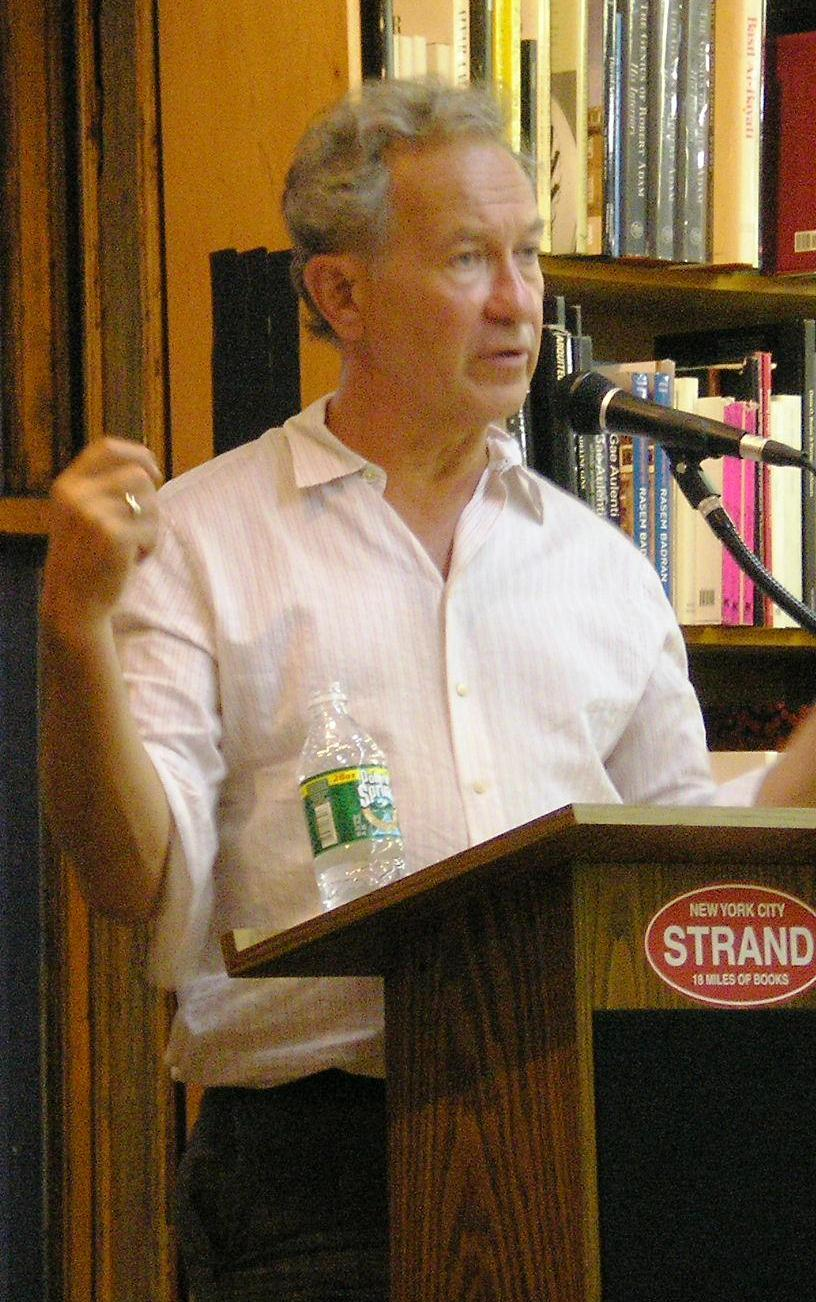
Sir Simon Schama

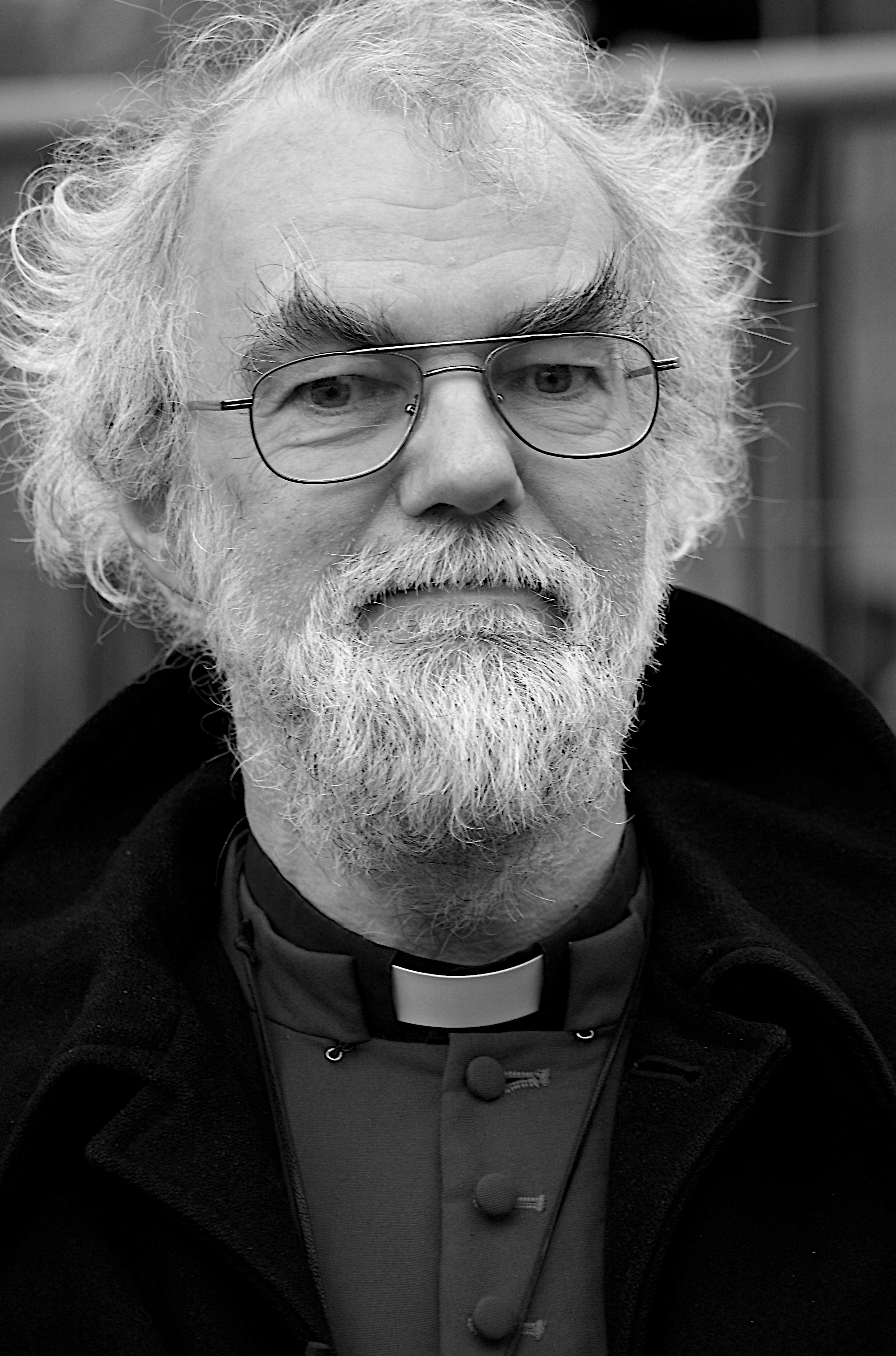
Rowan Williams

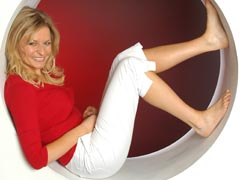
Jasmine Birtles

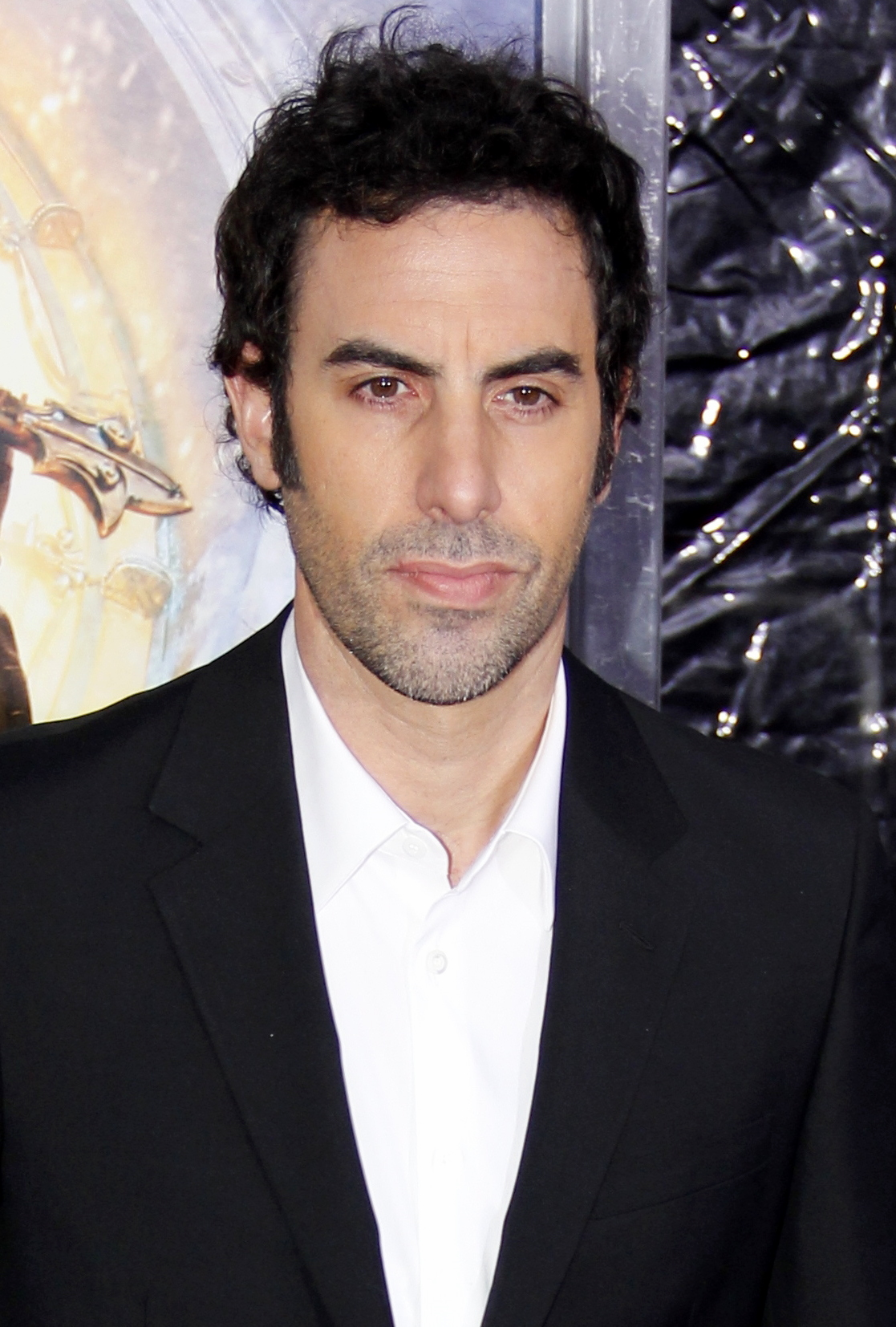
Sacha Baron Cohen

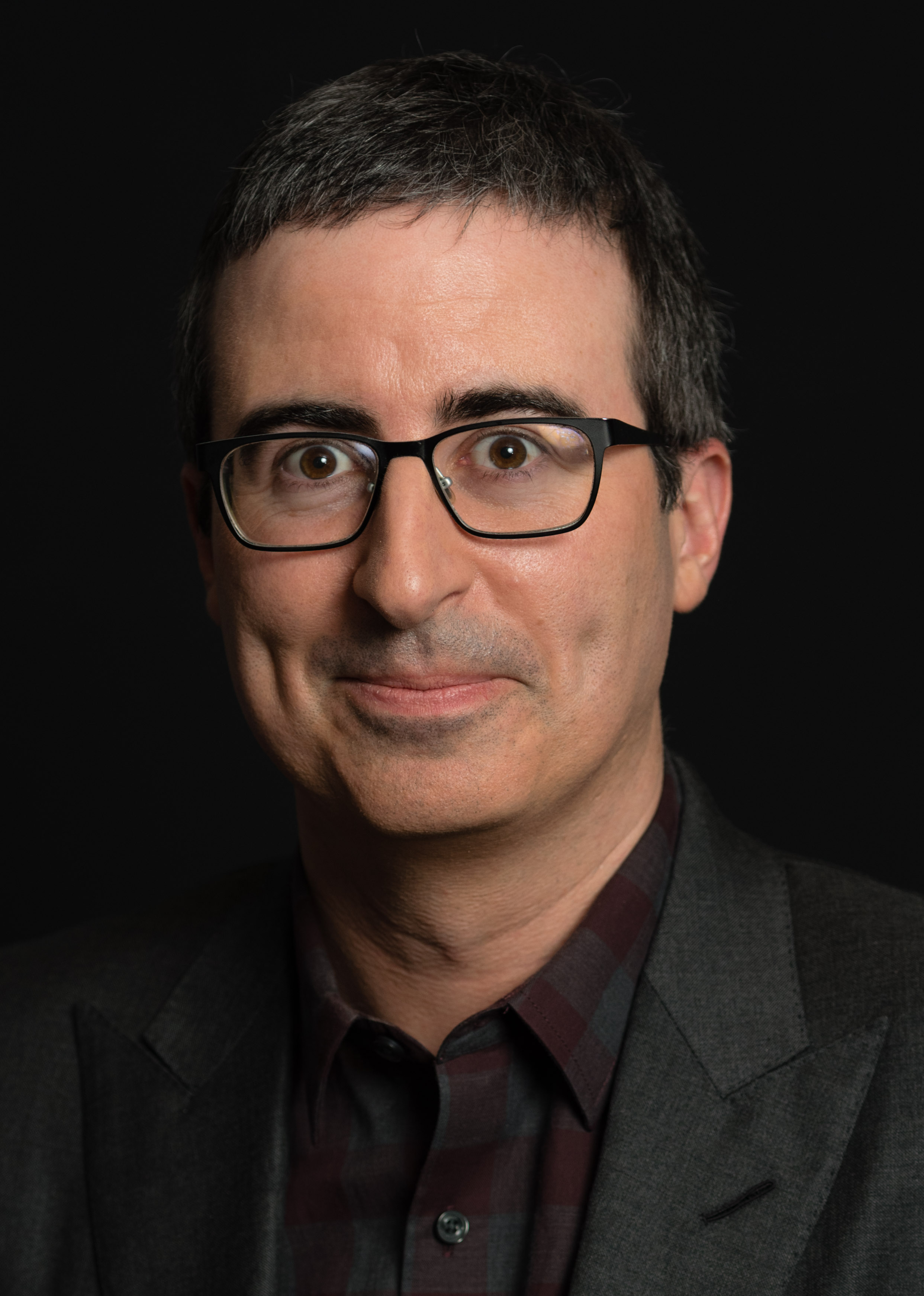
John Oliver

Name	Birth	Death	Career
Prince Ra'ad bin Zeid Al-Hussein	1936		Jordanian Prince
Prince Zeid Ra'ad Zeid Al-Hussein	1964		UN High Commissioner for Human Rights
William Ames	1576	1633	Reformed Theologian
Thomas Baines	1622	1680	Physician, original Fellow of Royal Society
Richard Bancroft	1544	1610	Archbishop of Canterbury, Organiser of James I Bible
Sacha Baron Cohen	1971		Comedian
Jasmine Birtles	1962		British financial and business commentator, television presenter, author and journalist
Jagdish Chandra Bose	1858	1937	Indian physicist
C. Delisle Burns	1879	1942	Atheist and secularist writer and lecturer
Brian Cantor	1948		Vice-Chancellor of the University of Bradford and previously of the University of York
Sir Anthony Caro	1924	2013	Sculptor
Randolph Carter	1874	1932	Explorer
John Cook	1918	1984	Prolific Anglo-American composer and organist
Miles Corbet	1594/5	1662	Regicide
Frederick Cornwallis	1713	1783	Archbishop of Canterbury
John Cornwell	1940		British author and journalist
John James Cowperthwaite	1916	2006	Credited with policies allowing Hong Kong's economic boom in the 1960s
John Cridland	1961		Director-general of the Confederation of British Industry
Charles Darwin	1809	1882	British naturalist
Patrick Arthur Devlin, Baron Devlin	1905	1992	Jurist, Lord of Appeal in Ordinary
Colin Dexter	1930	2017	Novelist
Jill Duff	1972		Bishop of Lancaster
George Dwyer	1908	1987	Archbishop of Birmingham; Council Father of the Second Vatican Council
James Chuter Ede	1882	1965	Home Secretary and Leader of the House of Commons
Sir Martin Evans	1941		Biochemist, Nobel laureate in medicine
Dee Ferris	1973		British Painter
John Finch	1626	1682	Ambassador, original Fellow of Royal Society
Noel Gay	1898	1954	Composer
Nina Gold	1964		BAFTA-winning casting director
Edmund Grindal	1519	1583	Archbishop of Canterbury
Alfred Cort Haddon	1855	1940	Father of modern anthropology
Duncan Haldane	1951		Physicist, Nobel laureate in physics
Yusuf Hamied	1936		Chemist and industrialist
Natalie Haynes	1974		Writer and broadcaster and a former comedian.
John Healey	1960		British politician, Chancellor of the Exchequer since July 2026
Derry Irvine, Baron Irvine of Lairg	1940		Lord Chancellor
Phillip King	1934	2021	Sculptor
David Knowles	1896	1974	Historian
David Konstant	1930	2016	Roman Catholic Bishop of Leeds
John Kotelawala	1897	1980	Prime Minister of Ceylon (Sri Lanka)
John Leland	c 1506	1552	Father of English history
Tony Lewis	1938		England and Glamorgan cricket captain; writer and broadcaster
Michael Liebreich	1963		Clean energy expert, founder of Bloomberg New Energy Finance
Richard Luce	1936		Lord Chamberlain
Michael Lynch	1965		Founder of Autonomy Systems
Edward Petronell Manby	1864	1929	Medical Officer to the Ministry of Health
Allama Mashriqi	1883	1963	Founder of the Khaksar Tehreek
Sir Peter Mathieson	1959		Vice-Chancellor of the University of Edinburgh
David Mellor	1949		British politician
Sir Walter Mildmay		1589	Founder of Emmanuel College, Cambridge
Miles Millar	c 1967		Hollywood screenwriter and producer
John Milton	1608	1674	English poet
Helen Mort	1985		Poet
Louis, 1st Earl Mountbatten of Burma	1900	1979	Admiral (RN) and statesman
Thomas Nelson, Jr.	1738	1789	Governor of Virginia; signer of the American Declaration of Independence
Davidson Nicol	1924	1994	Sierra Leonean academic, diplomat, physician, and writer
John Oliver	1977		British political comedian
J. Robert Oppenheimer	1904	1967	American theoretical physicist and 'father of the atomic bomb'
Andy Parsons	1967		English comedian and writer
William Paley	1743	1805	English theologian and philosopher
Steve Palmer	1968		Professional football player
John Peile	1838	1910	Philologist
William Perkins	1558	1602	Leading Puritan Theologian of the Elizabethan Era
Sir John Plumb	1911	2001	British historian
Thomas Plume	1630	1704	English cleric, founder of the University's Plumian Chair of Astronomy and Experimental Philosophy
Roy Porter	1946	2002	British historian
Beilby Porteus	1731	1809	Bishop of Chester and Bishop of London, leading reformer and abolitionist
Maheshi Ramasamy			Physician and lecturer
Peter Rawlinson	1919	2006	Attorney General for England and Wales
Forrest Reid	1875	1948	Cambridge apostle, novelist, literary critic
Austin Robinson	1897	1993	British Economist and economic historian
Thomas Robinson, 2nd Baron Grantham	1738	1786	British foreign secretary
David Say	1939	2006	Bishop of Rochester
Sir Simon Schama	1945		British historian, author, and television presenter
Sir Nicholas Serota	1946		Director of the Tate Gallery
Walter William Skeat	1835	1912	Philologist
Jan Smuts	1870	1950	Prime Minister of South Africa, Field Marshal, and Commonwealth statesman
Charles Snow, Baron Snow	1905	1980	British novelist and philosopher
John Soothill	1925	2004	Paediatric immunologist
F. Gordon A. Stone	1925	2011	British chemist
Szeming Sze	1908	1998	Chinese Diplomat, WHO co-founder
Nicholas Tarling	1931	2017	Historian
Sir Jeffrey Tate	1943	2017	Conductor
John Tayloe III	1770	1828	Plantation owner, horse breeder and American politician. Imported Diomed to the United States
Henry Teonge	1620	1690	Naval chaplain and diarist
Andrew Turnbull, Baron Turnbull	1945		Cabinet Secretary and head of the Civil Service
Edward Whitehead Reid	1883	1930	Aviator
Richard Whiteley	1943	2005	British television presenter
Rowan Williams	1950		British theologian, Anglican Archbishop of Canterbury, Master of Magdalene College, Cambridge
Sir Christopher Zeeman	1925	2016	British mathematician
