= St John Zachary =

Former church-site in London

Coordinates: 51°30′58″N 0°5′44″W

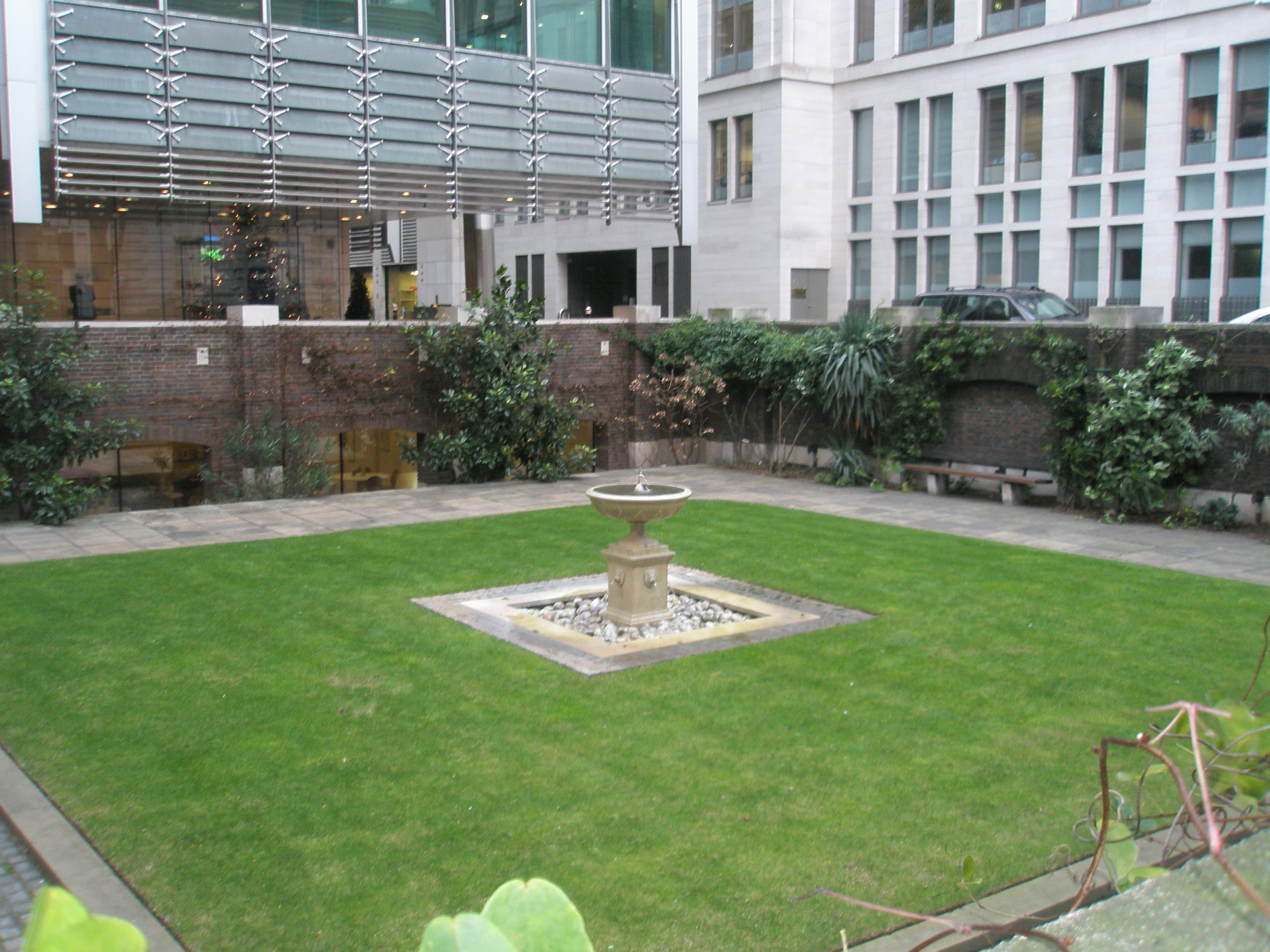
- Current photo of site
- St John Zachary
- Location: London
- Country: England
- Denomination: Church of England

History
- Founded: 10th century

Architecture
- Demolished: 1666

St John Zachary (meaning "St John, son of Zechariah", i.e. John the Baptist) was a church, first mentioned in official records in 1181, within the City of London, England, on the north side of Gresham Street, Aldersgate. Its vicar from 25 May 1424 to an unknown date was William Byngham, the founder of England's first teacher training college. It was destroyed in the Great Fire of London in 1666 and not rebuilt, with its parish being united with that of St Anne and St Agnes by section 55 of the Rebuilding of London Act 1670 (22 Cha. 2. c. 11) – an arrangement that lasted until the 20th century. Its site is now a garden, first made by the fire watchers in 1941. Partial records survive at IGI.

== Interment ==
The church was the guild church of the Worshipful Company of Goldsmiths, who were a powerful guild in the City of London with at least two mayors buried here, Sir Drugo Barentyn (died 1415) and Sir Nicholas Twyford (died 1390).

== In film ==
The 2011 film The Girl with the Dragon Tattoo, directed by David Fincher, used the churchyard as a filming location.
