= William Byngham =

English priest

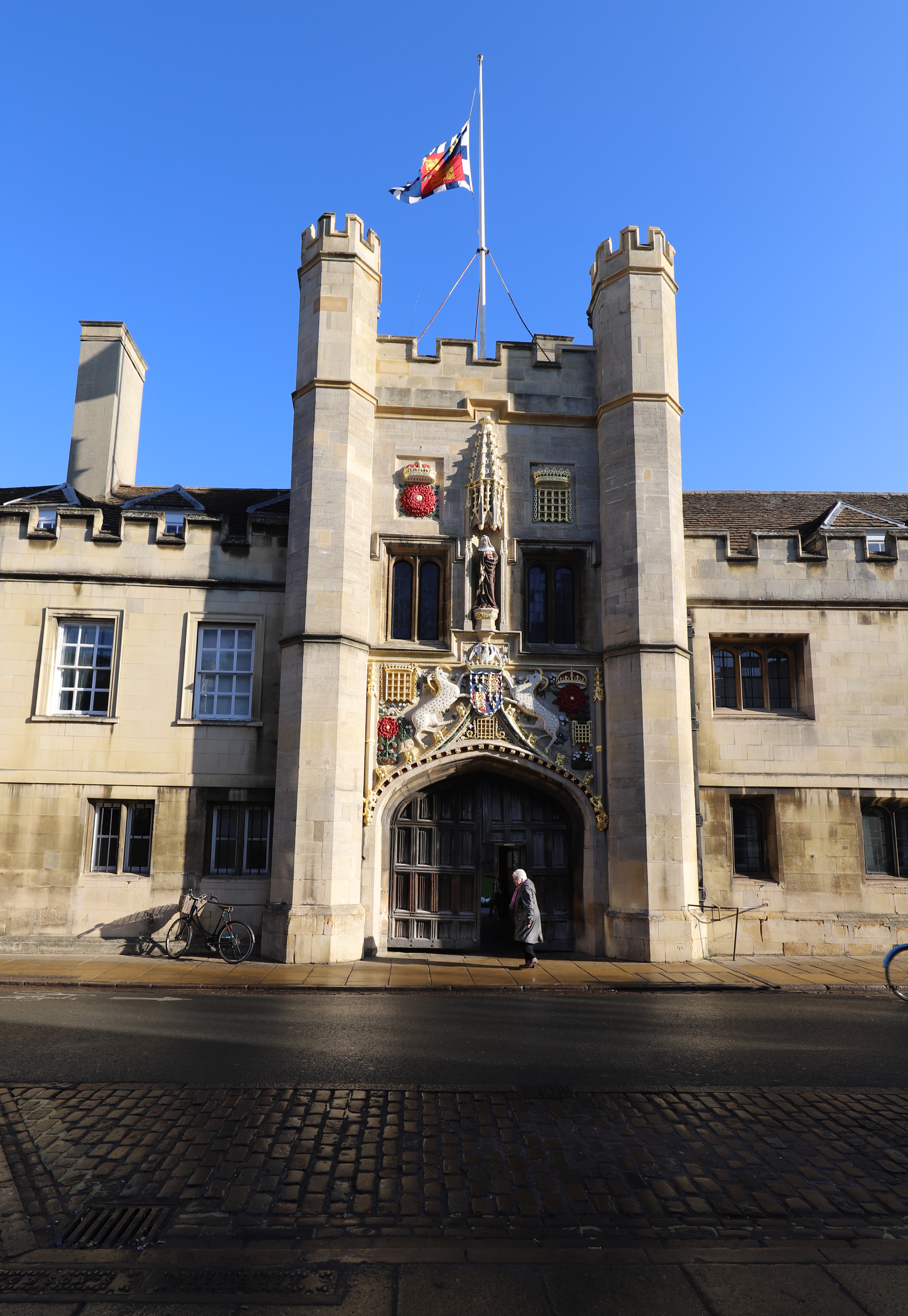
Christ's College, which grew out of Byngham's foundation of God's House.

William Byngham (also William Bingham) (c. 1390 – 17 November 1451) was an English priest and the founder of God's House, a college of the University of Cambridge.

Byngham became vicar of St John Zachary in the City of London on 25 May 1424, where, along with other prominent clergy such as Worthyngton (St Andrew, Holborn), Lychefield (St Mary Magdalene, Old Fish Street) and Cote (St Peter-upon-Cornhill), he petitioned wealthy aldermen, and indeed King Henry VI himself, to restore the grammar schools. The foundation of God's House in Cambridge in 1437 (with financial backing from a former Lord Mayor of London John Brokley) should have been a triumphant conclusion to his long campaign, but it took a further decade before his foundation was finally given the royal seal of approval. God's House was intended to train grammar school masters, and as such has been described as the first secondary school teacher training college in Britain. The college was displaced from its original site in 1443, to make way for the royal foundation of King's College, and endured a period of financial hardship before being refounded in 1505 as Christ's College by Lady Margaret Beaufort.
