= Ranjan Ramasamy =

Medical researcher

- Education: University of Cambridge (BA Natural Sciences 1971, PhD Immunology 1974)
- Occupation: Medical researcher
- Board member of: Chairman, National Science Foundation of Sri Lanka (2002–2004); Member, International Council for Science Scientific Planning and Review Committee (2002–2009)
- Awards: Presidential Award for Scientific Publication (2013, 2014), Sri Lanka Medical Association Seneviratne Award (1993), Wijerama Award (1992)
- Website: ORCID 0000-0003-0246-7053

Ranjan Ramasamy is a medical researcher who specialises in immunology and vector-borne diseases. He has held positions at the London School of Hygiene & Tropical Medicine and Babraham Institute, and was Professor of Immunology at the University of Brunei Darussalam and Professor of Biochemistry at the University of Jaffna. He served as Chairman of the National Science Foundation of Sri Lanka (2002-2004) and as a member of the International Council for Science Scientific Planning and Review Committee (2002-2009). He received his PhD in immunology from the University of Cambridge in 1974.
