= Sri Lankans in Malaysia =

Malaysians of Sri Lankan origin
Total population
- 30,000+

Regions with significant populations
- Kuala Lumpur, Penang, Perak

Languages
- Mainly: Tamil, English; Also: Malay and Sinhala

Religion
- Hinduism, Catholicism, Protestantism, Theravada Buddhism, Islam

Related ethnic groups
- Sri Lankan diaspora, Sri Lankans in Singapore, Tamil Diaspora, Tamil Malaysians

Sri Lankan Malaysians are people of full or partial Sri Lankan descent who were born in or immigrated to Malaysia.

== History ==
The Ceylonese (mostly Tamils with smaller numbers of Sinhalese and Burghers) started arriving in Malaya with the advent of the 19th century. They were sought after by the British to assist in the administration of the British Government of Malaya. The British offered them readily available appointments in its service as it was not the practice of the British Government to employ persons direct from England. Instead they advertised vacancies in its service in prominent dailies of Ceylon inviting suitable applicants to apply for the posts.

After the Pangkor Treaty of 1874, the British embarked upon the construction of roads, railways, schools, hospitals and government offices in the Malay Peninsula, to develop the country and to increase its revenue and the Ceylonese were brought to survey the railways and to build and man them, to be apothecaries in the hospitals, to be technical assistants to qualified engineers and to staff the clerical services on which an expanding government was bound increasingly to depend.

With the establishment of the Federated Malay States, a large number of clerks, surveyors, hospital assistants, teachers and technical assistants from Ceylon began to arrive.

== Settlement ==
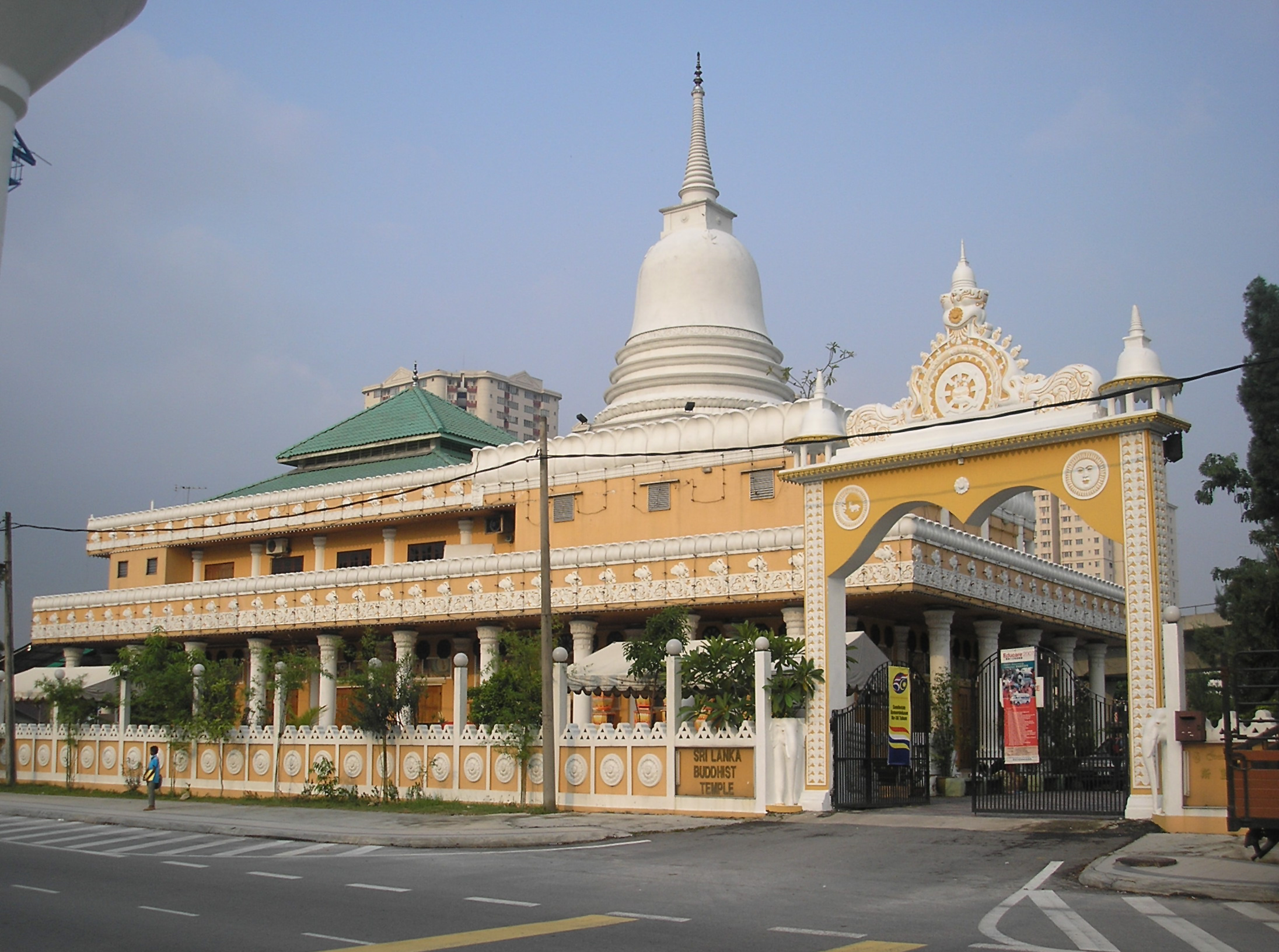
Sri Lanka Buddhist Temple (from Lorong Timur), Sentul, Kuala Lumpur

Sri Kandaswamy Kovil along Jalan Scott

In Kuala Lumpur, the Ceylon Tamil population was mainly concentrated in Brickfields and Sentul because of the proximity of the Administrative Centre of the Malayan Railway (opposite the railway station) and the Sentul Workshop. The Government provided accommodation for the white and the blue collar workers in these areas. The Ceylon Tamils living in both these areas are mostly devout Saivites and as they fervently believed that "no one should live in a place that has no Temple ", they soon began to organise themselves into Associations.

This led to construction of the Sri Kandaswamy Kovil, which has become a landmark and tourist attraction in the city, showcasing Sri Lankan Tamil and Hindu architecture at its finest.

== Politics ==
In 1958, the Malaysian Ceylonese Congress was established as a political party with the aim of giving support to the then Alliance party. MCC has continuously supported the Barisan Nasional and the Government. It was formed to promote and preserve the Political, Educational, Social and Cultural aspects of the Malaysian Ceylonese Community.

== Notable people ==
=== Academicians ===
- Ramon Navaratnam, Malaysian economist

=== Business people and entrepreneurs ===
- Weeratunge Edward Perera, Malaysian Sinhalese educator, social entrepreneur and businessman

=== Journalist ===
- Asohan Aryaduray

=== Musician ===
- Francissca Peter, Malaysian singer
- Salwa Sunanda, Malaysian singer and member of KLP48

=== Politicians ===
- Senator Tan Sri Dato Dr C. Sinnadurai
- S. J. V. Chelvanayakam
- D. R. Seenivasagam
- E. E. C. Thuraisingham

=== Religious ===
- Ven. Dr. Kirinde Sri Dhammananda Nāyaka Thero, Sri Lankan Buddhist monk and scholar.
- Ven. Datuk K. Sri Dhammaratana, Sri Lankan Buddhist monk and instrumental in setting up Ti-Ratana Welfare Society

== See also ==
- Buddhist Maha Vihara, Brickfields
- Mahindarama Buddhist Temple
- Sinhalese People
- Malaysia–Sri Lanka relations
