= Buddhism in Malaysia =

Malaysian Buddhist
- Percentage population of Buddhist in Malaysia according to 2020 census

Total population
- 5.6 million (2010); 19.8% of the country's total population ▲

Regions with significant populations
- Penang; Selangor; Kuala Lumpur; Johor; Perak; Kelantan

Languages
- Liturgical: Pali; Sanskrit; Classical Chinese; Classical Tibetan; Common; Malaysian Mandarin; English; Thai; Sinhala; Burmese; Indian languages; Malay

Religion
- Mahayana Buddhism (Chinese); Theravada Buddhism (Chinese, Sri Lankans, Thais, Indians, and Burmese)

Buddhism is the second largest religion in Malaysia, after Islam, with 18.7% of Malaysia's population being Buddhist, although some estimates put that figure at 21.6% when combining estimates of numbers of Buddhists with figures for adherents of Chinese religions which incorporate elements of Buddhism. Buddhism in Malaysia is mainly practised by the ethnic Malaysian Chinese, but there are also Malaysian Siamese, Malaysian Sri Lankans and Burmese in Malaysia that practice Buddhism such as Ananda Krishnan and K. Sri Dhammananda and a sizeable population of Malaysian Indians.

== History ==
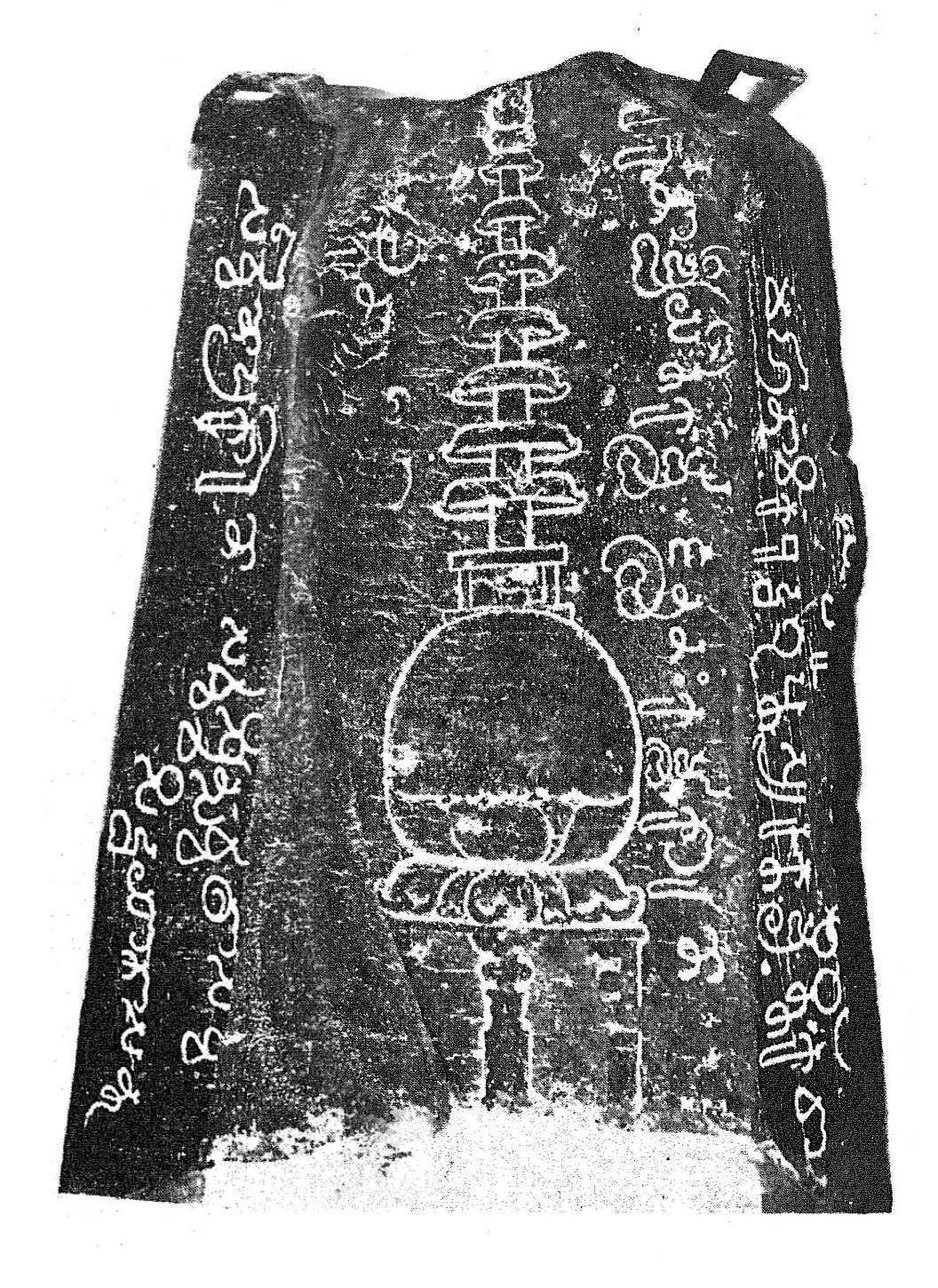
Rubbing of the Buddhist Mahanavika Buddhagupta stone inscription, 5th century CE, Penang.

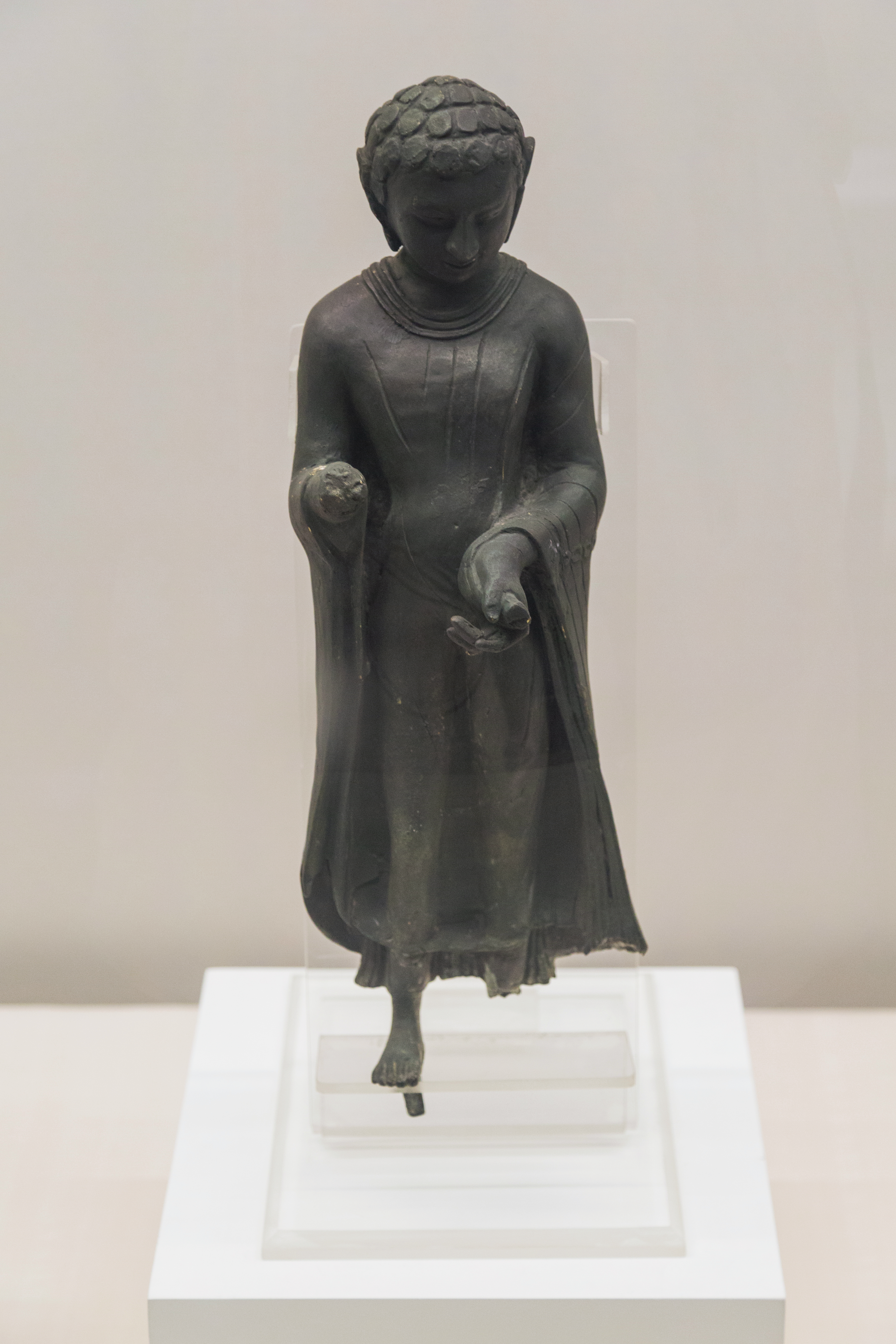
Standing Buddha statue made from brass, found in a tin mine in Pengkalan Pegoh, Ipoh, Perak in 1931.

Buddhism was introduced to the Malays and also to the people of the Malay Archipelago as early as 200 BCE. Chinese written sources indicated that some 30 small Indianised states rose and fell in the Malay Peninsula. Malay-Buddhism began when Indian traders and priests traveling the maritime routes and brought with them Indian concepts of religion, government, and the arts. An archeology research group from Universiti Sains Malaysia in late June 2024 found three Sanskrit stone inscriptions containing mantras and doctrinal texts plus a complete stucco statue of Buddha within the grounds of the Bukit Choras complex not far from Bujang Valley in southwest Kedah dated around 8-9th centuries, earlier than those in Angkor Wat and Borobudur.

For many centuries the peoples of the region, especially the royal courts, synthesised Indian and indigenous ideas including Hinduism and Mahayana Buddhism and that shaped their political and cultural patterns. However, the Malay Kedah Kingdom denounced Indian religion after the king of Chola from Tamil Nadu attacked them in the early 11th century. The king of Kedah, Phra Ong Mahawangsa, was the first Malay ruler to denounce the traditional Indian religion; he converted to Islam, and in the 15th century, during the golden age of the Malacca Sultanate, the majority of Malays converted to Islam.

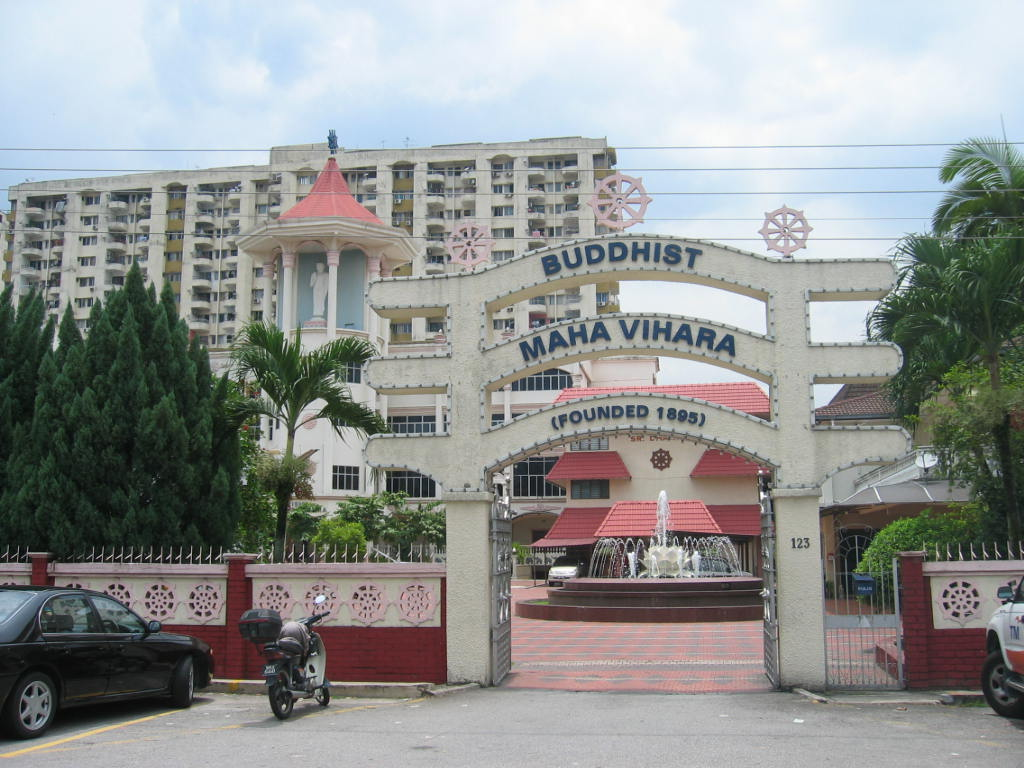
The Maha Vihara Buddhist Temple in Brickfields, Kuala Lumpur.

== Status ==
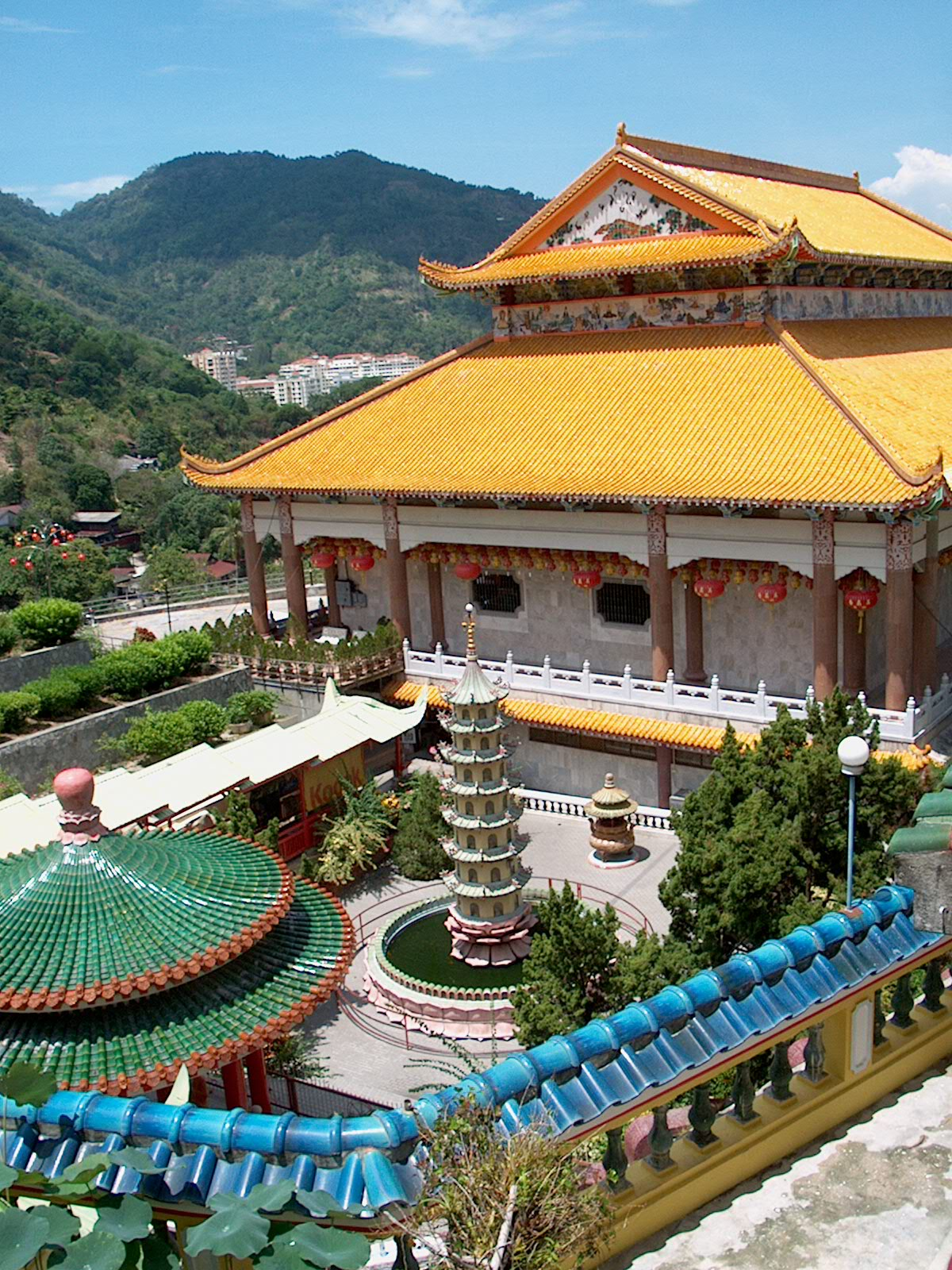
Kek Lok Si, or "Temple of Sukhāvatī", in Penang, Malaysia

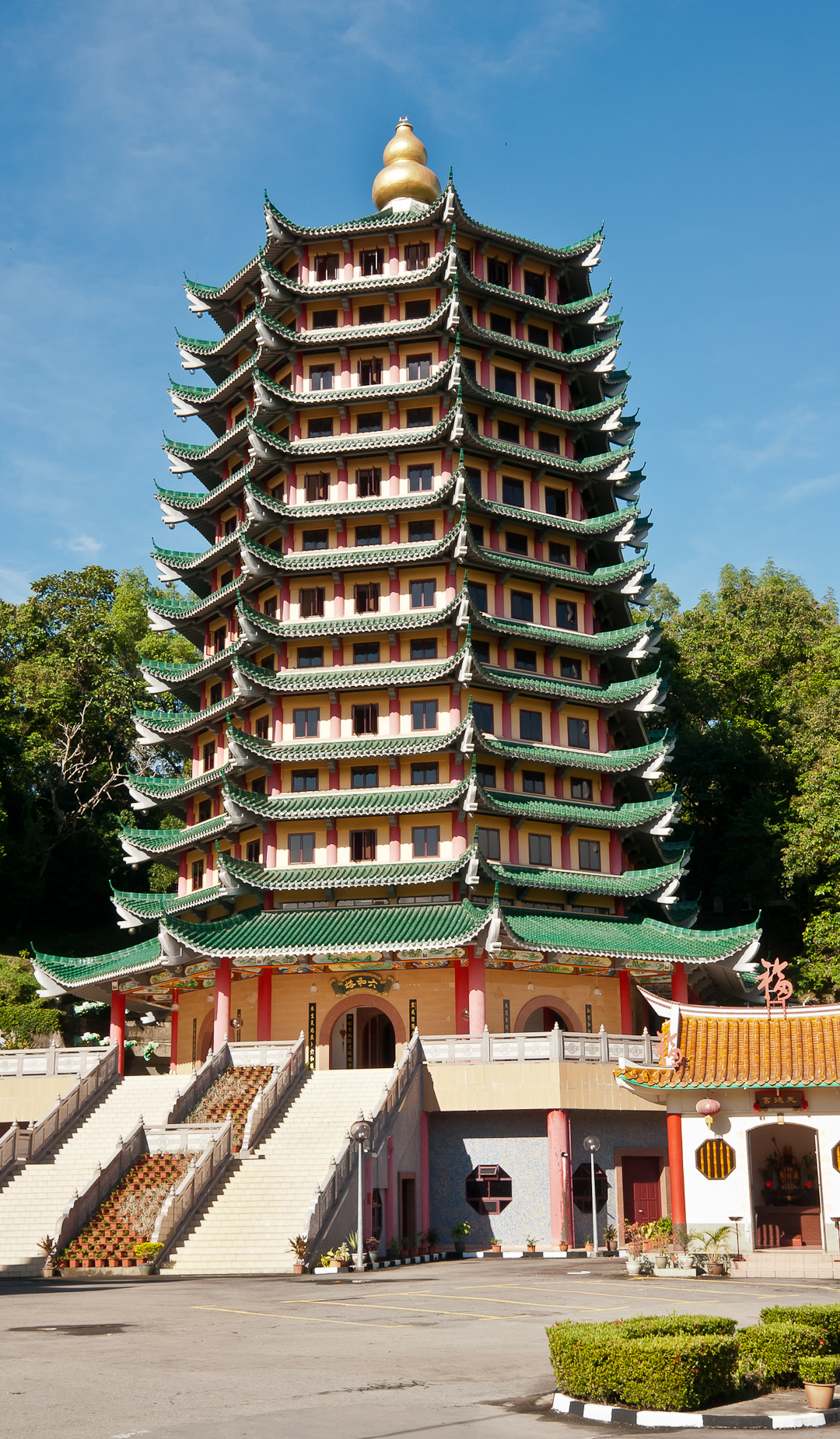
Che Sui Khor Pagoda in Kota Kinabalu.

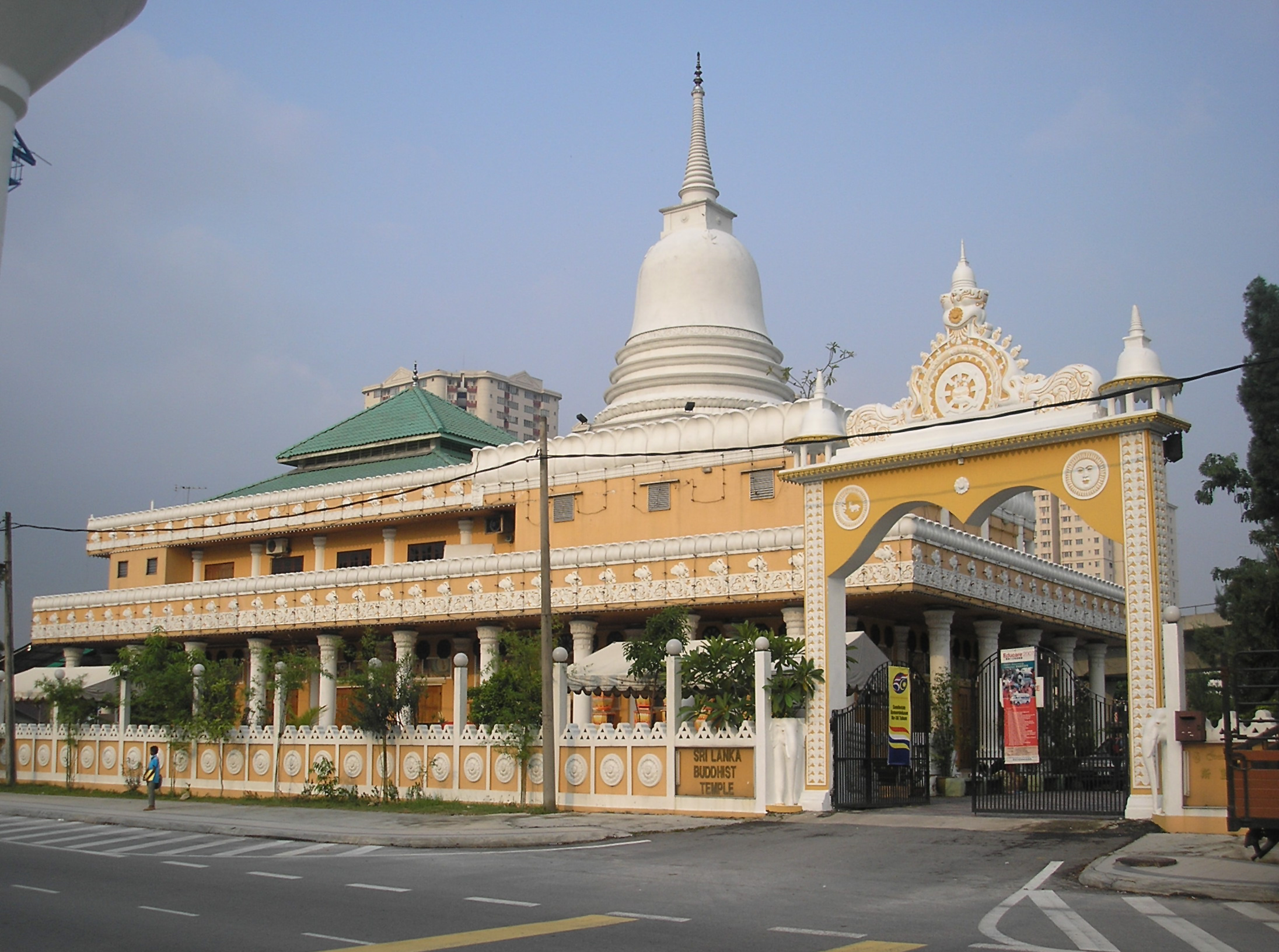
Sri Lanka Buddhist Temple (from Lorong Timur), Sentul, Kuala Lumpur

According to the Malaysian constitution, the majority ethnic group, the Malays, are legally defined as Muslim. They constitute 60% of the population, with the remainder consisting mostly of Chinese, who are generally Buddhists or Christians, and to the lesser extent Indians, who are generally Hindus. There are also smaller numbers of other indigenous and immigrants; among the latter are Malaysians of Sinhalese, Thai, and Eurasian origin. Nearly all of the Buddhists in Malaysia live in urban areas, since they are mostly engaged in business or employed in various professions.

Recently, a number of Malaysian Buddhist leaders have responded to the decline in religious participation by the children of Buddhist families, have attempted to reformulate their message to address modern life more directly. Groups involved in these education efforts include the Buddhist Missionary Society Malaysia (BMSM), which was founded by late Ven K. Sri Dhammananda. BMSM leaders have argued that, while many educated youths seek an intellectual approach to Buddhism, an equally large number of people prefer to approach the religion through the tradition of ceremony and symbolism. In response to these needs, religious practices are carried out, but in a way that is simple and dignified, removing what can be seen as superstition. Efforts are made to explain why suttas are chanted, lamps lit, flowers offered, and so on.

As a religion without a supreme head to direct its development, Buddhism is practised in various forms, which, although rarely in open conflict, can sometimes lead to confusion among Buddhists. In Malaysia, some ecumenical moves have been made to coordinate the activities of different types of Buddhists. One example is the formation of the Joint Wesak Celebrations Committee of the temples in Kuala Lumpur and Selangor, which coordinates the celebration of Wesak, a holiday commemorating the birth of the Buddha. An initiative has also begun to form a Malaysian Buddhist Council, representing the various sects of Buddhism in the country to extend the work of the development of Buddhism, especially in giving contemporary relevance to the practise of the religion, as well as to promote solidarity among Buddhists in general.

In 2013, a video of a group of Vajrayana Buddhist practitioners from Singapore conducting religious service in a surau had become viral on Facebook. Malaysian police have arrested a resort owner after he allowed 13 Buddhists to use a Muslim prayer room (surau) for their meditation at Kota Tinggi, Johor. The incident has been a frown upon Muslims in Malaysia. It has also become a hot topic in the social media. Following up at 28 August 2013, the controversial prayer room was demolished by the resort management within 21 days from the date of receipt of the notice after much protests by the residents of Kota Tinggi. At the time, Syed Ahmad Salim, the resort owner explained that he had allowed the group of Buddhists to use the surau for a meditation session as he was unaware that it was an offence.

== Distribution of Buddhists ==
Distribution of Buddhist Malaysians by ethnic group (2010 census)
1. Chinese (95.0%)
2. Non-citizen (2.90%)
3. Other Ethnic Group (0.90%)
4. Other Bumiputera (0.60%)
5. Indian (0.60%)

According to the 2010 Census, 5,620,483 people or 19.8% of the population identify themselves as Buddhists. Most Chinese Malaysian follow a combination of Buddhism, Taoism, Confucianism and Chinese ancestral worship but, when pressed to specify their religion, will identify themselves as Buddhists. As a result, 83.6% of all the Chinese Malaysian self-identifying as Buddhists. Information collected in the census based on respondent's answer and did not refer to any official document.

=== By gender and ethnic group ===
Gender	Total Buddhist Population (2010 Census)	Malaysian Buddhist Citizens					Non-Malaysian Buddhist Citizens
Gender	Total Buddhist Population (2010 Census)	Bumiputera Buddhist		Non-Bumiputera Buddhist			Non-Malaysian Buddhist Citizens
Gender	Total Buddhist Population (2010 Census)	Malay Buddhist	Other Bumiputera Buddhist	Chinese Buddhist	Indian Buddhist	Others Buddhist	Non-Malaysian Buddhist Citizens
Nationwide	5,620,483	0	33,663	5,347,687	32,441	51,274	161,418
Male Buddhist	2,903,709	0	16,611	2,759,151	16,888	25,429	91,630
Female Buddhist	2,716,774	0	17,052	2,588,536	15,553	25,845	69,788

=== By state or federal territory ===
State	Total Buddhist population (2010 Census)	% of State Population
Johor	989,316	29.5%
Kedah	275,632	14.2%
Kelantan	57,792	3.8%
Kuala Lumpur	597,770	35.7%
Labuan	7,795	9.0%
Malacca	198,669	24.2%
Negeri Sembilan	216,325	21.2%
Pahang	215,815	14.4%
Penang	556,293	35.6%
Perak	597,870	25.4%
Perlis	22,980	9.9%
Putrajaya	273	0.4%
Selangor	1,330,989	24.4%
Terengganu	25,653	2.5%
Sarawak	332,883	13.5%
Sabah	194,428	6.1%

== Current problems ==
The rights of religious minorities in Malaysia, including but not limited to those of Buddhists, Hindus and Sikhs, are sometimes described as hindered by the existing legal framework.

=== Islam as the dominant religion ===
Islam is the official religion of Malaysia. The constitution of Malaysia declares that Islam is the only religion of genuine Malay people. According to the Ketuanan Melayu doctrine, the bumiputera or autochthonous populations are required to be Muslims, thereby coupling Malay ethnic identity with Muslim religious identity. Apostasy from Islam, whether to irreligion or to another religion, is against the law; however, the conversion of others to Islam is permitted. In fact, according to some sources, the government actively promotes the conversion to Islam in the country. The law requires any non-Muslim who marries a Muslim to first convert to Islam, any such marriages contracted in violation of the law are ipso facto void. Should a parent adopt Islam, their children are automatically declared Muslims without the consent of either parent.

=== Destruction of religious sites ===
Several Buddhist temples have been demolished by the government under the pretext of having been built on public land. The land in question is then sold to developers for purposes of gentrification. In 2014, some ruins of candi (tomb temple) in Bujang Valley were destroyed by an urban developer, causing an international outcry against attacks on cultural heritage.

== Theravada Buddhism ==
The Theravada Buddhist Council of Malaysia (Malay: Majlis Buddhis Theravada Malaysia; Chinese: 马来西亚南传佛教总会; abbrev: TBCM) is a council or umbrella body consisting of member organizations which represents all Theravada Buddhism traditions in Malaysia. It also accepts organizations that are inclined towards Theravada Buddhism as ordinary and associate members.

Theravāda Buddhism has been present in Malaysia for centuries, primarily among the Thai ethnic communities living near the northern border with Thailand. The Thai bhikkhu sangha formed a vibrant and active group that positively influenced other ethnic groups, particularly the Chinese in the northern regions. However, language and cultural barriers meant that only a small number of Chinese individuals became ordained in the Thai sangha. It wasn’t until the early part of the 21st century that Theravāda Buddhism began to significantly affect the Chinese Malaysian community, driven by a unique mix of factors. The earliest Theravāda organization established in Malaysia was the Sasana Abhiwurdhi Wardhana Society (SAWS), officially registered in the late 1800s. Initially catering to the Sri Lankan immigrant community, the society would later become notably influential around fifty years later. During its early years, the Sri Lankan bhikkhus it welcomed—similar to the many Thai temples present at the time—primarily served members of their own ethnic group. Subsequently, various Theravāda Buddhist organisations have emerged.

On 25 December 2011, representatives from 23 Theravāda Buddhist organisations from 9 Malaysian states met in Kuala Lumpur. The concerns of various organisations were freely discussed and there was unanimous agreement on the need to establish the Theravāda Buddhist Council of Malaysia.

The TBCM is a participating member of the Malaysian Buddhist Consultative Council (MBCC).

== Notable people ==
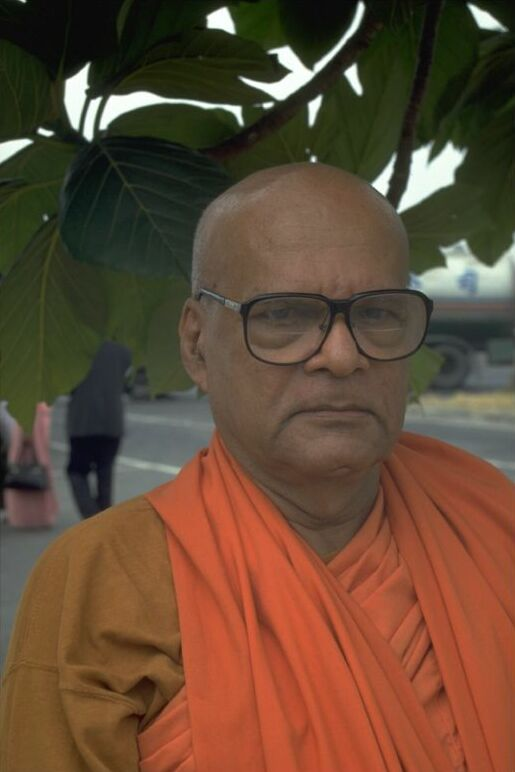
K. Sri Dhammananda

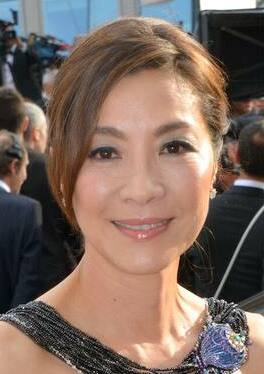
Michelle Yeoh

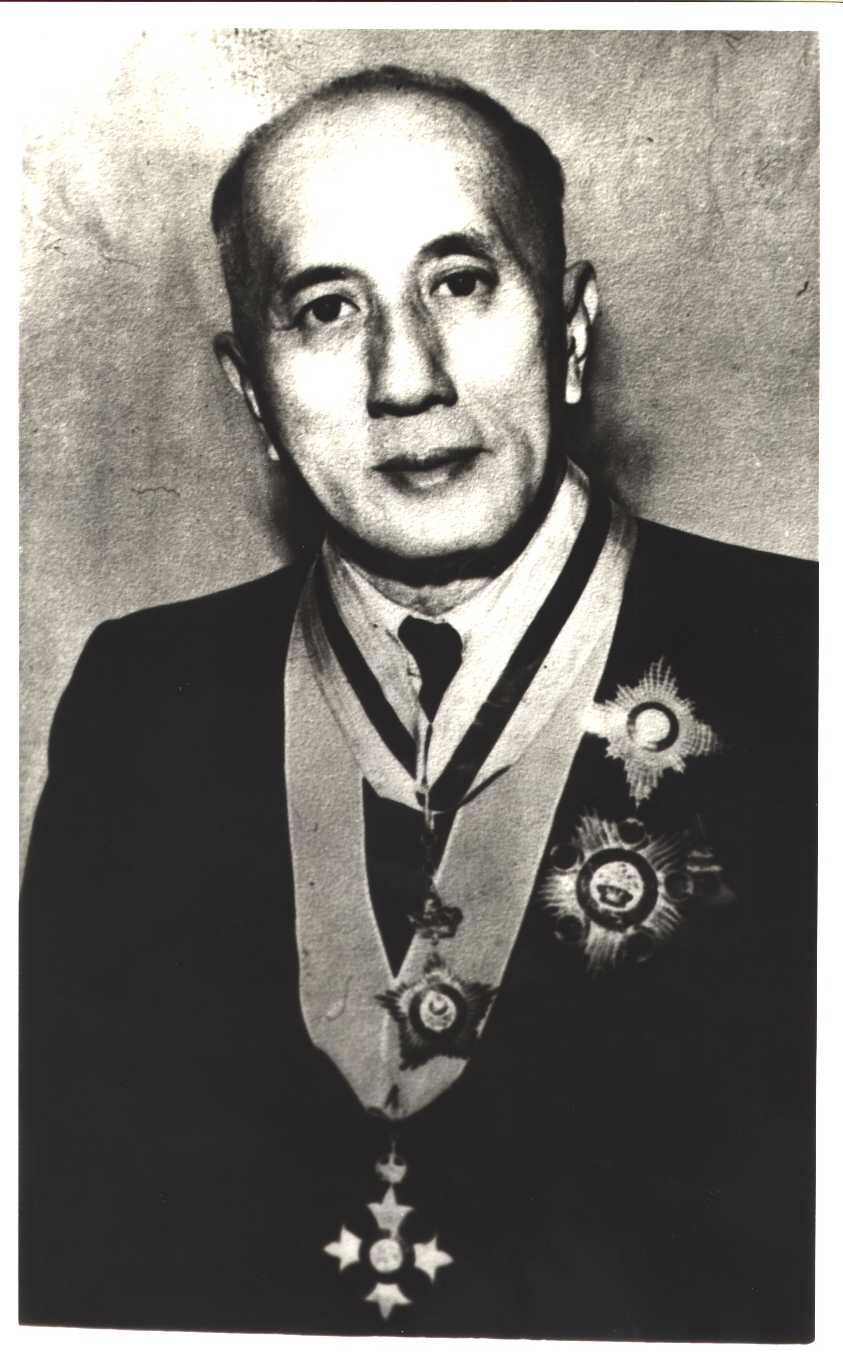
Tan Cheng Lock

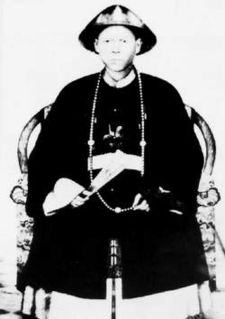
Yap Ah Loy

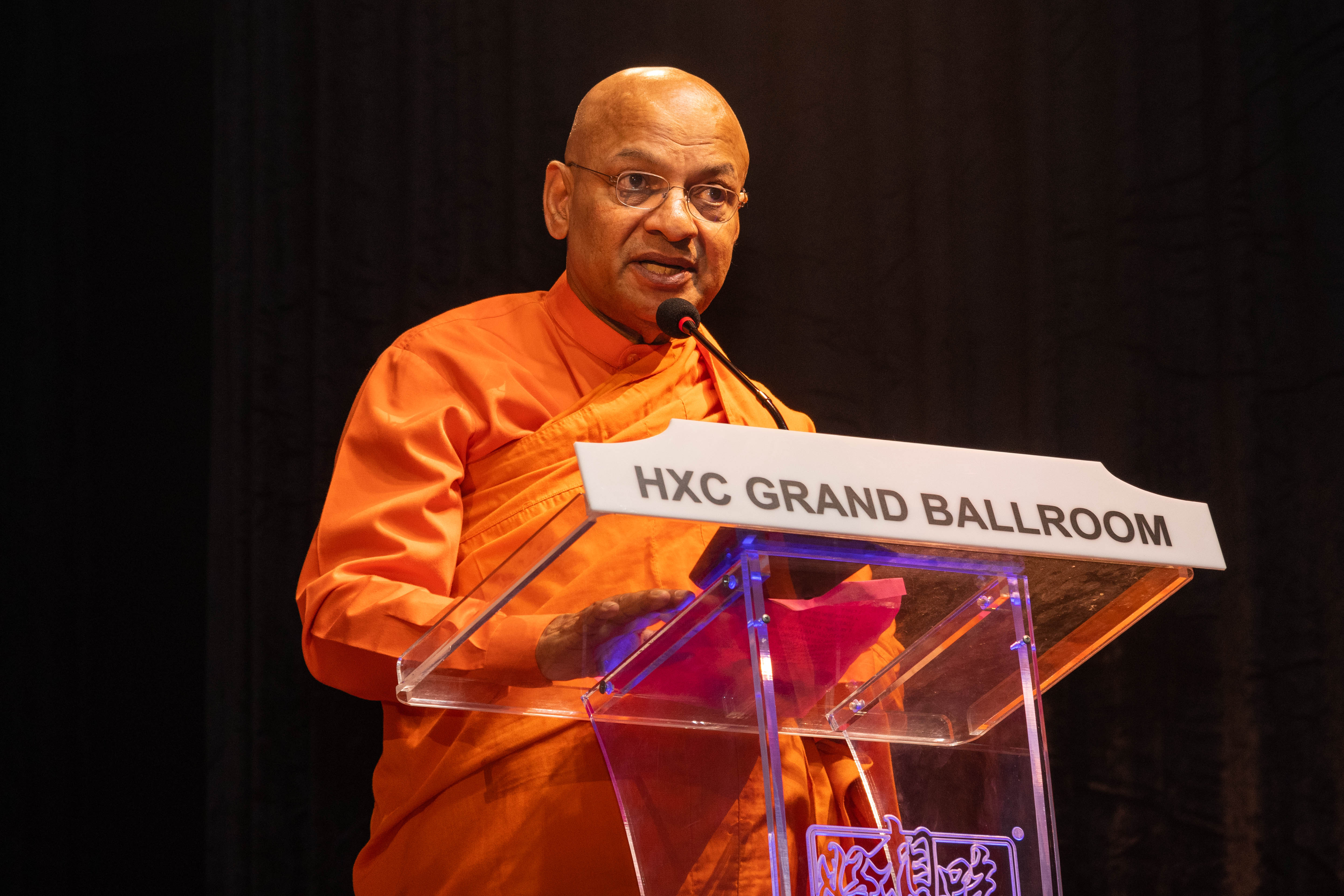
K. Sri Dhammaratana
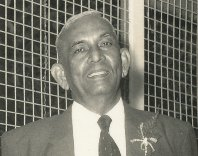
Weeratunge Edward Perera

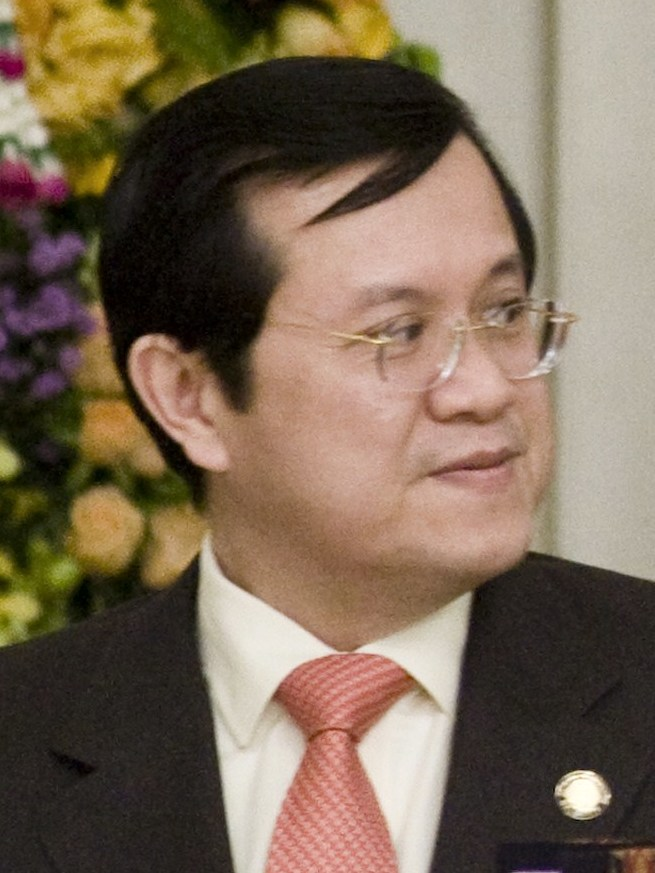
Ong Tee Keat

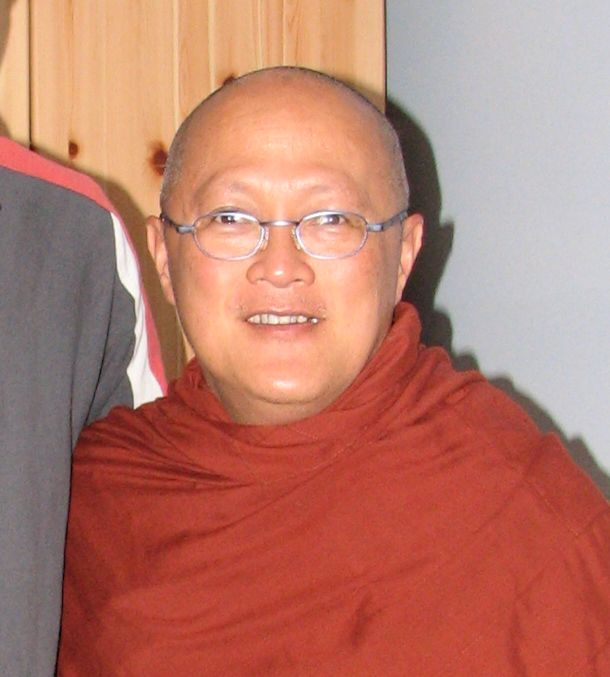
Sujiva

== See also ==
- Ven. K. Sri Dhammananda
- Ven. Pannavamsa
- Ven. K. Sri Dhammaratana
- Ven. K. L. Dhammajoti
- Ven. Sujiva
- Ven. Chi Chern
- Ven. Sumangalo
- Malaysian Siamese
- Sri Lankans in Malaysia
- Buddhist Maha Vihara, Brickfields
- Wat Chetawan
- Malaysian Buddhist Institute
- Theravada Buddhist Council of Malaysia
- Vajrayana Buddhist Council of Malaysia
- Buddhism in Indonesia
- Buddhism in Southeast Asia
- Bujang Valley, an ancient Hindu-Buddhist civilisation centred on Kedah
