= Buddhist Institute =

Buddhist Institute may refer to:

- Buddhist Institute, Cambodia
- Karmapa International Buddhist Institute
- Institute of Buddhist Studies
- Malaysian Buddhist Institute
- Nalanda Buddhist Institute, Bhutan
- Namgyal Monastery Institute of Buddhist Studies
- Central Institute of Buddhist Studies
- International Buddhist Academy
- Larung Gar Buddhist Academy
- Soka Gakkai Italian Buddhist Institute
- Barua Buddhist Institutes in India and Bangladesh

== See also ==
- Buddhist studies
