= LBA =

LBA or lba may refer to:

== Science ==
- Live blood analysis, the observation of live blood cells through a dark field microscope
- Long branch attraction, an error in molecular phylogeny
- Ligand binding assay, an assay whose procedure relies on the binding of ligands to receptors, antibodies, and other macromolecules.

== Technology ==
- Linear bounded automaton, a construct in computability theory
- Location-based advertising, a form of advertising in mobile telecommunications
- Logical block addressing, a method for specifying locations on computer storage devices

== Transport ==
- Luftfahrt-Bundesamt, the national civil aviation authority of Germany
- Leeds Bradford Airport (IATA code: LBA), an airport in England

== Sports ==
- Lega Basket Serie A, the top-tier level men's professional club basketball league in Italy.
- Libyan Olympic Committee (IOC code: LBA), the national Olympic committee of Libya

== Other uses ==
- Ladakh Buddhist Association, a Buddhist organization in India
- Lairawn Baptist Association, a Baptist organization in Burma
- Late Bronze Age, an archaeological era
- Little Big Adventure, a 1994 video game
- Lui (ISO 639 code: lba), a variety of the Sak language of Bangladesh and Myanmar
- Letter before action, a letter stating a legal claim

== See also ==
- Iba (disambiguation)
