= Enam Ul Haque =

Bangladeshi ornithologist and writer

- ইনাম আল হক
- Pronunciation: [inam al hɔk]
- Born: 25 August 1945 (age 81); Kushtia, Bengal Province, British Raj
- Other name: Birdman of Bangladesh
- Citizenship: Bangladeshi
- Education: Government Rajendra College (BSc, 1966); University of Dhaka (MBA, 1978)
- Occupations: Ornithologist; naturalist; writer; explorer; wildlife photographer; military officer
- Years active: 1959–present
- Works: Bibliography
- Awards: National Environment Medal (2022); Bangla Academy Literary Award (2023)
- Honours: See below
- Writing career
- Language: Bengali; English
- Period: Modern
- Genres: non-fiction, popular science
- Subjects: Ornithology, natural history, geographical exploration
- Notable works: Pakhidero Ache Naki Mon, Phuler Pashe Pokkhi Ashe, Ruposhi Banglar Pakhi, Bangladesher Pakhir Field Guide
- Military career
- Allegiance: Pakistan (1969–1971); Bangladesh (1973–1995)
- Branch: Pakistan Air Force; Bangladesh Air Force
- Service years: 1969–1971; 1973–1995
- Rank: Wing Commander
- Conflicts: Bangladesh Liberation War (POW)

Enam Ul Haque (Note: Bengali pronunciation: [inam al hɔk].) (Bengali: ইনাম আল হক, pronounced [inam al hɔk]; born 25 August 1945) is a Bangladeshi ornithologist, naturalist, author, explorer, wildlife photographer, and former military officer. He won the Bangla Academy Award in 2023.

== Background ==
Enam Ul Haque was born on 25 August 1945, in Hizlabat village, Kushtia District in the then Bengal Province, British India. He was the fourth among three sons and four daughters of Usuf Ali and Kaniz Fatema. His first essay on the topic of moon landing was published in 1959. He earned a bachelor's degree from Rajendra College in Faridpur District and an MBA degree from the Institute of Business Administration at the University of Dhaka in 1979. He later got training in communication-electronics engineering in the United States.

== Career ==
Haque started his career at the Jute Research Institute in 1967. In 1969, he joined the Pakistan Air Force as an aeronautical engineer. During the 1971 Bangladesh Liberation War, he was held as a prisoner of war in Pakistan and was released in 1973 through a prisoner exchange agreement. He retired from the Air Force as a Wing Commander in 1995. He then worked for BRAC and GQ Industries. He retired in 2005.

After leaving the Air Force, he started researching in ornithology. In 1998, he started writing columns, "Hawk Eye View,", for the Daily Janakantha.

Haque established Bangladesh Bird Club in 1996. His first book "Innocent Bangladesh", a photo album on disadvantaged children, was published by Cosmos Publications Ltd in 2004. His notable books include "The Essential Bangladesh Bird Field Guide", "Birds also have a mind?", and "Birds of Beautiful Bengal".

Haque received the 2023 Bangla Academy Award for his contribution to science, and the National Environment Medal from the government of Bangladesh.

Haque's photograph exhibitions were held in Singapore, Iran, and Indonesia.

== Personal life ==
Haque's wife died from cancer in 2019.

Haque founded the Bangla Mountaineering and Trekking Club in 2003, which guided four members of his Everest team to successfully summit the peak. He is one of the first Bangladeshis to have traveled to Antarctica in 1997 and the North Pole in 2007.

Haque ran a marathon at the North Pole on his 62nd birthday.

== Bibliography ==
1. Innocent Bangladesh (2004)
2. Pakhidero Ache Naki Mon (পাখিদেরও আছে নাকি মন, 2013)
3. Feathered Splendours Birds of Bangladesh (2014)
4. Bangladesher Pakhir Field Guide (বাংলাদেশের পাখির ফিল্ডগাইড, 2015)
5. Bengoma-Bengomir Moto Koto Pakhi (বেঙ্গমা-বেঙ্গমীর মতো কত পাখি, 2018)
6. Phuler Pashe Pokkhi Ashe (ফুলের পাশে পক্ষী আসে, 2023)
7. Shonar Palok Diye Tin Konnar Biye (সোনার পালক দিয়ে তিন কন্যার বিয়ে, 2023)
8. Ruposhi Banglar Pakhi (রূপসী বাংলার পাখি)
9. Nishorgo Manob (নিসর্গ মানব, 2025)

== Awards and honours ==
Year	Award	Category	Nominated work	Awarded by	Result	Ref.
2022	City Bank-Tarupallab Dwijen Sharma Nisarga Award	Biodiversity and environmental conservation	—	City Bank PLC and Tarupallab	Won	
2022	National Environment Medal	Environment-related education and publicity	—	Government of Bangladesh	Won	
2023	Bangla Academy Literary Award	Environment and science	—	Bangla Academy	Won	
