= Sri Lankans in Bermuda =

Total population
- est. 400 (2005)

Languages
- English, Sinhalese, Tamil

Religion
- Buddhism, Hinduism, Islam, Catholicism

Related ethnic groups
- Sri Lankan people

Sri Lankans in Bermuda refer to Sri Lankans living in Bermuda. As of 2005, there are an estimated 400 living and working there. Sri Lankans in Bermuda are known for their giving in times of need for Sri Lanka, such as the Sri Lankan Civil War and the Boxing Day Tsunami. In 1979, there were only 6 Sri Lankans living in Bermuda.

== Organisations ==
- Bermuda Help Sri Lanka Relief Fund

== See also ==
- Sri Lankan diaspora
- Asian American
