= IBA =

IBA or Iba may refer to:

== Iba ==
=== People ===
- Clarence Iba (1909–1997), American basketball coach
- Erol Iba (born 1979), Indonesian footballer
- Gene Iba (1940–2025), American college basketball coach
- Henry Iba (1904–1993), American basketball coach
- Moe Iba (born 1939), American basketball coach
- Itsuki Iba, a fictional character in the Japanese light novel series Rental Magica

=== Places ===
- Iba, Osun State, town in Nigeria
- Iba, Zambales, municipality in Zambales, Philippines

- Roman Catholic Diocese of Iba

== IBA ==
=== Academia ===
- Institute of Business Administration (disambiguation)
- Intercollegiate Biomathematics Alliance
- International Bar Association
- International Bryozoology Association

=== Finance ===
- Indian Banks' Association
- International Bank of Asia, a defunct bank in Hong Kong, now Fubon Bank
- International Bank of Azerbaijan

=== Media ===
- Independent Broadcasting Authority, a defunct regulatory body in the United Kingdom
- Israel Broadcasting Authority, the former Israeli public broadcaster

=== Sport ===
- International Basketball Association
- International Bodyboarding Association
- International Boxing Association
- ÍB Akureyri, former Icelandic sports club, abbreviated ÍBA
- Iron Butt Association

=== Organizations ===
- Inquilinos Boricuas en Acción, Boston community development organization
- International Bartenders Association
  - List of IBA official cocktails
  - IBA Tiki, a cocktail named after the organization
- International Association for Bear Research and Management, sometimes shortened to the International Bear Association
- International Buddhist Academy

=== Science and technology ===
- Ion Beam Applications, solutions for the diagnosis and treatment of cancer
- American Association of Petroleum Geologists Imperial Barrel Award Program
- iBooks Author, iPad ebook authoring software (usually iBA); IBA can also refer to its file format
- Important Bird Area
- Incinerator bottom ash
- Indole-3-butyric acid, auxin, a plant rooting hormone
- InfiniBand Architecture
- Interceptor body armor
- Ion beam analysis, a set of analytical techniques involving the use of ion beams
- Isobutyl alcohol, an organic solvent

=== Other uses ===
- Interest-based advertising
- Internationale Bauausstellung
