= Vajrayana Buddhist Council of Malaysia =

Umbrella body consisting of Vajrayana Buddhist organizations in Malaysia

- Majlis Penganut Buddha Vajrayana Malaysia 马来西亚金刚乘佛教总会
- Abbreviation: VBCM
- Formation: 1998 (Officially registered on 12 June 2002)
- Type: Umbrella council
- Legal status: Council
- Purpose: To represent the Tibetan Vajrayana Buddhism interest in Malaysia.
- Headquarters: 36A (First Floor), Jalan 52/18, PJ New Town, 46200 Petaling Jaya, Selangor
- Region served: Malaysia
- President: Chew Eng Ghee
- Key people: Rev. K. Dhammaratana Thera (Chief High Priest Malaysia)
- Website: Official website
- Remarks: Vajrayana Buddhist Council of Malaysia on Facebook

The Vajrayana Buddhist Council of Malaysia (Malay: Majlis Penganut Buddha Vajrayana Malaysia; Chinese: 马来西亚金刚乘佛教总会; abbrev: VBCM) is a council or umbrella body consisting of member organizations which represents all Tibetan's Vajrayana Buddhism traditions in Malaysia. It also accepts individuals who are inclined towards Vajrayana Buddhism as associate members.

The VBCM is a council body whereby Buddhist Societies from the four Tibetan Buddhist Traditions in Malaysia work together under one umbrella to coordinate the religious activities of Vajrayana Buddhists.

The motto of the council is: "To Uphold the Unity, Harmony and Understanding among Vajrayana Buddhist Organisations in Malaysia."

== Background information ==
In 1998, with the encouragement of the Malaysian Government, a Malaysian Buddhist Coordinating Committee (MBCC) was formed, consisting of several national Buddhist councils.

At that time, there was no council representing the Vajrayana Buddhist organizations in Malaysia. Hence, a proposal to form a council representing Vajrayana Buddhist organizations was first proposed in 1998. The number of Tibetan-based Buddhist organizations also had increased and there was a need for a representation of the Vajrayana Buddhist Community in dealing with the Government and other Buddhist umbrella bodies.

After several years of discussion, a pro-tem committee was formed in April 2000. After many rounds of discussions, the formation of the VBCM was finally proposed with more encompassing aims.

The VBCM was included as a participating member of the Malaysian Buddhist Consultative Council (MBCC) from 2000. Eventually, the VBCM was also recognized and registered by the Malaysian Registrar of Societies (RoS) on 12 June 2002. There were 20 founding member organizations in the VBCM.

In 2008, VCBM supported the call by the Malaysian Buddhist high priest K. Dhammaratana that politics should be kept out of the upcoming Beijing 2008 Summer Olympic Games and urged all its member organisations, all other Tibetan Buddhist societies or centers in Malaysia and the general public, not to disrupt the Olympic torch relay.

== See also ==
- Buddhism in Malaysia
- Theravada Buddhist Council of Malaysia
