= Mahindarama Buddhist Temple =

Sri Lankan Buddhist temple in Penang, Malaysia

- Malay: Kuil Buddha Mahindarama; Sinhala: මහින්දාරාම බෞද්ධ පන්සල
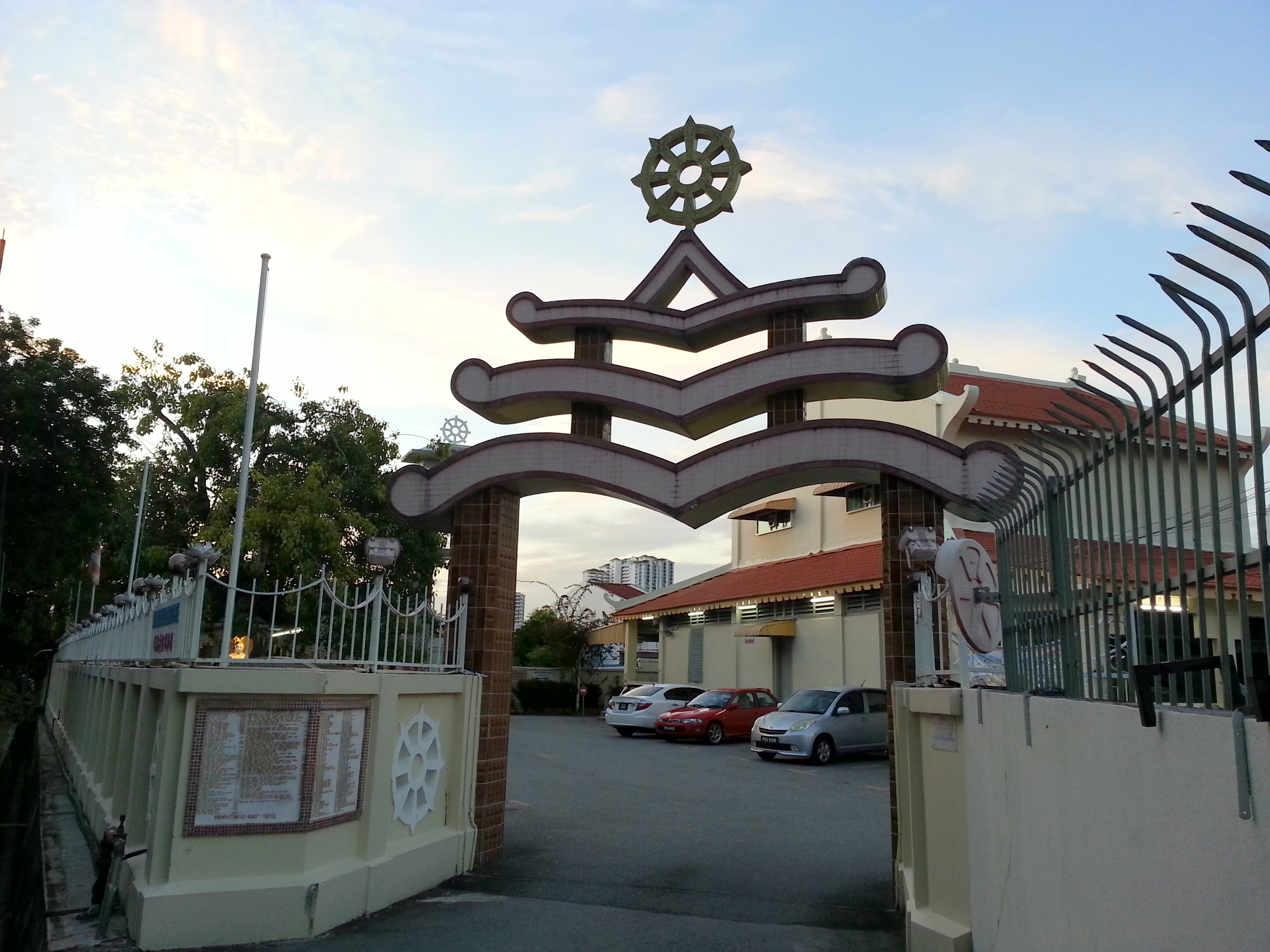

- Location within George Town

Religion
- Affiliation: Buddhism
- Status: Active

Location
- Location: Jalan Kampar
- Municipality: George Town
- State: Penang
- Country: Malaysia
- Interactive map of Mahindarama Buddhist Temple
- Coordinates: 5°24′31.655″N 100°18′26.299″E

Architecture
- Type: Sri Lankan temple
- Founder: A. Pemaratana Maha Thera
- Established: 1918
- Completed: 1933

Website
- mahindaramatemple.com

Mahindarama Buddhist Temple (Sinhala: මහින්දාරාම බෞද්ධ පන්සල, Chinese: 玛兴达拉麻佛寺) is a Theravada Buddhist temple within George Town in the Malaysian state of Penang. The only Sri Lankan temple in the state, it is also one of the select few in Malaysia that houses the relics of the Buddha. The temple becomes a focal point for the annual Vesak Day festivities within the city.

== History ==
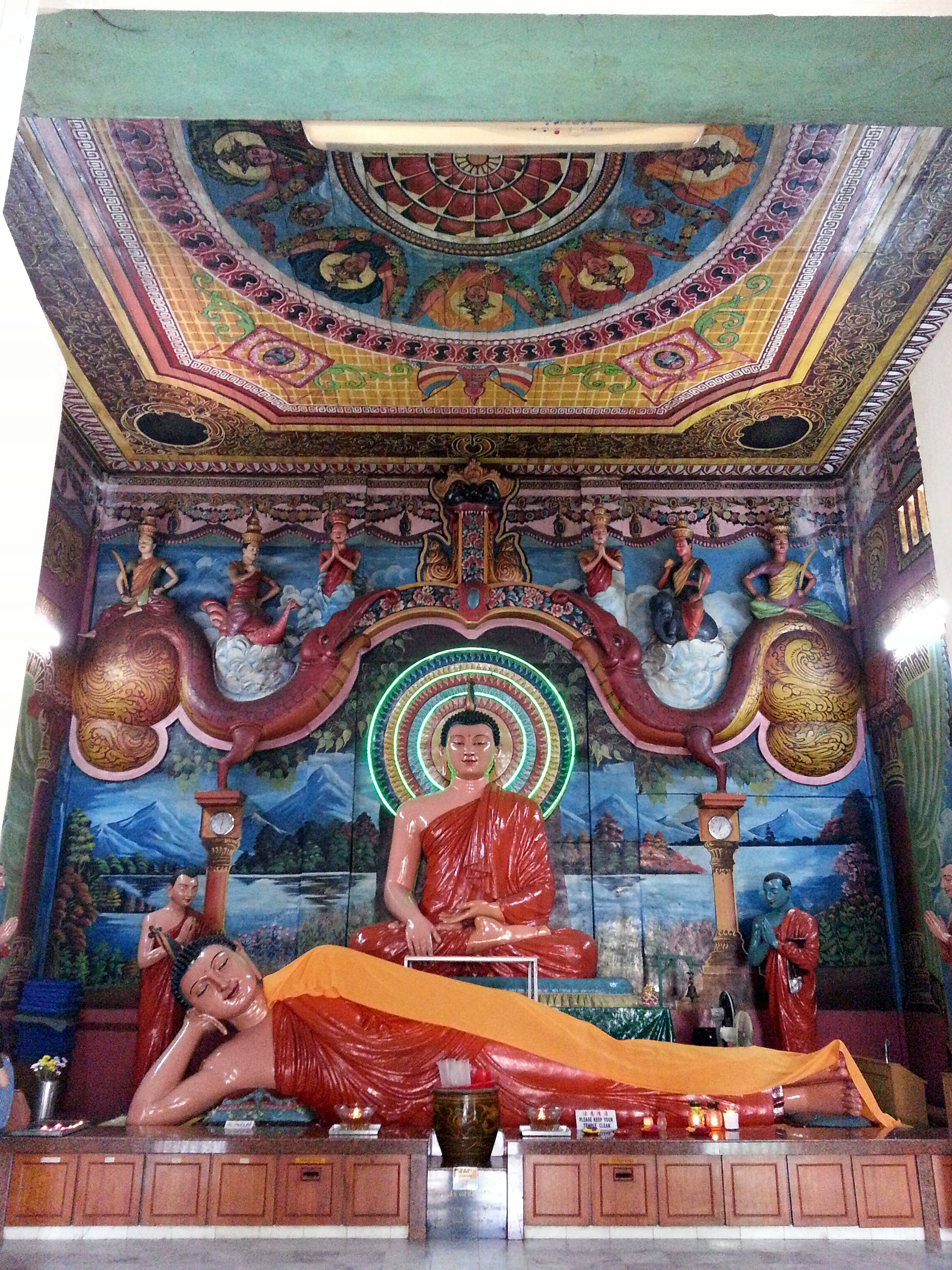
The main prayer hall (Sima), adorned with carvings by Sri Lankan artisans, was originally completed in the 1933.

The temple was founded in 1918 by A. Pemaratana Maha Thera, a Ceylonese monk who made a visit on Penang Island en route to Singapore. Whilst in George Town, A. Pemaratana resided within the Batu Lanchang Hokkien Cemetery where he gave Dhamma Desana sermons to a handful of devotees. The devotees, led by M. V. Gregory, a fellow Sinhalese bought a piece of land at Caunter Hall and presented it to the monk to set up the first Sri Lankan-style Buddhist temple in Penang. A shrine hall was then built with the support of the devotees for Pemaratana to carry out his missionary work along with a school named "Sāriputta" to teach Theravāda Buddhism and the English language. The temple were subsequently named as "Caunter Hall Buddhist Temple". But since the given land is prone to flooding, a new site was required for the temple relocation. With the sudden demise of Pemaratana in 1927, the responsibilities of the temple were then given to his only pupil, W. Sumanasara Thero who later continued the relocation and construction of the additional structure for the temple in its present location in Jalan Kampar in the 1930s.

== Features ==
A number of additional buildings were built for the temple including a library and a school which was completed in 1957 and 1959 respectively, followed by a bell tower in 1969 and later a multi-purpose building in 1991. In 2001, the temple was chosen as the first temple in Malaysia to house the Buddha's relics which then received by the temple's Chief Monk, E. Inda-rátana Maha Thera. The two bone fragments of the Buddha are currently displayed within the temple's main prayer hall. Pema-rátana's ashes were enshrined in a stupa erected at the temple compound. His legacy can also be seen to this day in the form of the temple's ficus religiosa (Bodhi tree), said to be a descendant of the original Bodhi tree bought to Anuradhapura in Upatissa Nuwara (present-day Sri Lanka) by bhikkhunī Saṅghamittā under which Buddha attained enlightenment. The tree sapling was then brought from then British Ceylon in the 20th century and planted in the temple compound after Pemaratana's demise in 1927. The main prayer hall called Sīma is adorned with carvings by Sri Lankan artisans with all the materials used for the decorations originally coming from Sri Lanka.
