= Sri Lankans in Singapore =

Languages
- Tamil · English · Sinhala · Other languages

Religion
- Hinduism · Buddhism · Catholicism · Islam

Related ethnic groups
- Sri Lankan diaspora · Sri Lankans in Malaysia · Sri Lankan Tamil diaspora

Sri Lankans in Singapore consist mainly of Singaporeans of Sri Lankan origin whose ancestors came to Singapore before the independence of the island. With respect to ethnic group data in Singapore, Sri Lankans were classified under "Others" until 1970, and have since been classified as "Indians".

== History ==
=== Colonial period ===
The Jaffna Tamils were predominantly large in number amongst people who came to resettle in Singapore and British Malaya in the 19th and early 20th centuries. Ever since their arrival in Singapore, they identifying themselves "Ceylonese". They dominated the bureaucracy in Singapore as the British administration preferred employing Ceylonese individuals as bureaucrats in many of their Asian colonies. Ceylonese Tamils made up an overwhelming majority in the civil service of British Malaya and Singapore prior to independence.

In 1909, the Ceylon Tamils, who had grown in number to about 300 families, formed the Singapore Ceylon Tamils’ Association (SCTA). Sri Lankans in Singapore and Malaysia formed the "Lanka Regiment" of the Indian National Army, directly under Netaji Subhas Chandra Bose.

Former Prime Minister of Singapore Lee Kuan Yew once said:

In terms of numbers, the Ceylonese, like the Eurasians, are among the smallest of our various communities. Yet in terms of achievements and contributions to the growth and development of the modern Singapore and Malaysia they have done more than warranted by their numbers. In the early days of Malaysia's and Singapore's history the civil service and the professions were manned by a good number of Ceylonese. Even today the Ceylonese community continues to play a prominent role in these and other fields of civil life.

For example in Singapore, today, the Speaker of Parliament is a Ceylonese. So is our High Commissioner in Great Britain. So is our Foreign Minister. In the Judiciary, in the civil service, in the university, in the medical Service and in the professions they continue to make substantial contributions out of all proportion to their numbers. They are there not because they are members of a minority community but on the basis of merit.

The point is that the Ceylonese are holding their own in open competition with communities far larger than them. They have asked for no special favour or consideration as a minority. What they have asked for – and quite rightly – is that they should be judged on their merits and that they be allowed to compete with all other citizens fairly and without discrimination. This, as far as the Singapore government is concerned, is what is best for all of us. I believe that the future belongs to that society which acknowledges and rewards ability, drive and high performance without regard to race, language or religion.

Some Ceylonese-founded institutions from the colonial era still exist. The Sri Senpaga Vinayagar Temple was founded by Ceylonese Tamils on the appropriately named Ceylon Road. Ceylon Sports Club was established in 1928 at its current premises along Balester Road and continues to function as not only a sports club but a social and charitable institution.

=== Post-independence ===
In recent years, many Sri Lankans have been coming to Singapore. Sri Lankan domestic workers form a large number of the 150,000 maids in Singapore. Many students from Sri Lanka have also been coming to Singapore for further education. On 31 July 2010, the Singapore Ceylon Tamils' Association celebrated its 100-year anniversary.

== Notable Singaporeans of Sri Lankan descent ==
Politics

- S. Rajaratnam – Deputy Prime Minister of Singapore (1980–1985), regarded as one of the founding fathers of independent Singapore
- Tharman Shanmugaratnam – Current President of Singapore (since 2023)
- Joshua Benjamin Jeyaretnam – Leader of the Workers' Party of Singapore (1971–2001)
- Kenneth Jeyaretnam – Current Secretary-General of the Reform Party (since 2009)
- Vincent Wijeysingha – Assistant Treasurer of the Singapore Democratic Party (2010–2013), first openly gay politician in Singapore

Law

- K. S. Rajah – Senior Counsel and former Judicial Commissioner of the Supreme Court of Singapore
- Philip Jeyaretnam – Lawyer
- Eugene Thuraisingam – Human rights lawyer

Education

- Lloyd Fernando – Malaysian author and professor at the University of Malaya in the English Department
- Rohan Gunaratna – International terrorism expert
- Shan Ratnam – Professor and head of the department of Obstetrics and Gynaecology of the National University Hospital

Arts

- Jacintha Abisheganaden – Singer and actress; father is Sri Lankan Tamil
- Natalie Hennedige – Theatre director and dramatist; father is Sinhalese
- Neila Sathyalingam – Classical Indian dancer
- Sharmila Melissa Yogalingam – Award-nominated writer
- Roshni Karwal – Television presenter and journalist

== See also ==
- Sri Lankan Tamil diaspora
- Indian Singaporeans
