= Sri Lankans in Lebanon =

Total population
- 7600 (2024)

Languages
- Sri Lankan English, Sinhalese, Sri Lankan Tamil, Lebanese Arabic, Lebanese French

Religion
- Buddhism, Hinduism, Islam, Catholicism

Related ethnic groups
- Sri Lankan people, Sri Lankan diaspora

Sri Lankans in Lebanon refer to people from Sri Lanka living in Lebanon. As of 2024, an estimated 7,600 Sri Lankan migrant workers. Sri Lankans generally go to the Middle East to find work, with a large domestic labour population in Lebanon.

== History ==
A large influx of Sri Lankan women into Lebanon had begun in the early 1990s, serving primarily as domestic labour in private households. Like other countries the Sri Lankan government has actively encouraged the 'export' of domestic labour as it has become the largest single source of foreign revenue for the country. However recently most Sri Lankan domestic workers have fallen under the category of 'contract slavery', given the legal and employment conditions they face.

In 2006, there are approximately 80,000 to 90,000 of them.

In 2022, International Organization for Migration(IOM), conducted Migrant Presence Monitoring (MPM) between May and July 2022 and a total estimated of 3,172 Sir Lankan were identified in Lebanon.
