= Sri Lankan diaspora =

Emigrants and expatriates from Sri Lanka

ශ්‍රී විසිරි ජන ප්‍රජාව

Total population
- 2,000,000+ (estimated)

Regions with significant populations
- United Kingdom: 700,000 (2024)
- United Arab Emirates: 320,000 (2023)
- Canada: 200,000 (2024)
- Australia: 186,000 (2026)
- India: 184,780 (2021)
- Qatar: 145,000 (2017)
- Italy: 113,705 (2025)
- Kuwait: 99,858 (2016)
- Saudi Arabia: 84,794 (2022)
- United States: 75,808 (2022)
- Japan: 73,067 (2025)
- France: 52,300 (2017)
- Switzerland: 28,838 (2019)
- Oman: 26,268 (2017)
- Germany: 25,900 (2019)
- South Korea: 20,239 (2017)
- New Zealand: 16,830 (2018)
- Norway: 16,570 (2021)
- Netherlands: 13,463 (2020)
- Denmark: 13,458 (2025)
- Jordan: 12,582 (2017)
- Singapore: 11,066 (2017)
- Bahrain: 10,099 (2017)
- Thailand: 7,931 (2017)
- Lebanon: 7,600 (2024)
- Cyprus: 7,350 (2011)
- Sweden: 7,106 (2017)
- Maldives: 7,062 (2017)
- Malaysia: 6,766 (2017)
- China: 5,554 (2017)

Languages
- Sinhala · Tamil · Vedda · Other languages of Sri Lanka and various languages of the countries they inhabit

Religion
- Theravada Buddhism · Hinduism · Islam · Christianity · Baháʼí Faith

Related ethnic groups
- Sri Lankans · Sinhalese · Veddas · Sri Lankan Tamils · Sri Lankan Moors · Sri Lankan Malays · Sri Lankan Chetties · Sri Lankan Kaffirs · Sri Lankan Burghers · Indian Tamils of Sri Lanka · Chinese people in Sri Lanka
- Populations stated are the maximum estimated United States population, Foreign born stated only

The Sri Lankan diaspora are a population grouping consisting of people who can trace their ancestry to the lands that make up the current modern-day state of Sri Lanka but live elsewhere.

As of the mid-2020s, estimates of the Sri Lankan diaspora vary, with the total number of Sri Lankan emigrants and expatriates commonly placed at over two million worldwide. According to international migration data compiled by the United Nations Department of Economic and Social Affairs, the stock of Sri Lankan emigrants was approximately 1.49 million in 2024, reflecting those born in Sri Lanka and residing abroad.

Significant Sri Lankan communities exist across multiple regions, including Europe, the Middle East, East Asia, Australia and North America.

Population figures for the diaspora may not account for all individuals of Sri Lankan descent. Many people of Sri Lankan origin — including those born outside Sri Lanka or holding citizenship of other countries — are not included in official counts based solely on place of birth or nationality, and substantial Tamil and Sinhalese communities outside the country may not be fully represented in these estimates.

A 2017 study noted that while most of the diaspora in the Western World and East Asia were long-term residents with a large percentage having local citizenship and children born in their host country, most of the diaspora in the Middle East were temporary workers with little roots in said countries; it is near impossible for Sri Lankans to obtain citizenship of Middle Eastern countries.

== History ==
=== Prior to the formation of Sri Lanka ===
Emigration from the island of Sri Lanka predates the formation of the modern nation-state by more than three millennia. Although prehistoric populations on the island engaged with neighboring regions through coastal and maritime contacts, evidence suggests that by at least the 1st millennium BCE, individuals from Sri Lanka were actively participating in regional networks of trade, religion, and warfare across the Indian Ocean. Communities and missions traveled to South Asia, Southeast Asia, and China, contributing to the transmission and institutional development of Theravāda Buddhism. Merchants and seafarers from the island were active in ports across southern Asia and beyond, facilitating commercial and cultural exchange.

Movement between the island and rest of southern South Asia was a persistent feature of the ancient and medieval periods. These movements included traders, mercenaries, religious communities, and settlers, and were often seasonal or circular rather than permanent. Nevertheless, they contributed to the establishment of communities in other parts of the Indian subcontinent and to long-standing cross-regional connections.

=== Ceylon ===
During the early modern period (16th–18th centuries), European colonial rule introduced new patterns of overseas movement. Under Portuguese, Dutch, and later British administration, Sri Lankans were employed or transported abroad as soldiers, sailors, laborers, and domestic servants. Some settled in colonial centers in Southeast Asia and the Indian Ocean region, including Batavia (present-day Jakarta).

More sustained and documented emigration developed during the British colonial period in the 19th and early 20th centuries. Sri Lankans, including Sinhalese, Tamils, Moors, and Burghers, migrated to other parts of the British Empire—such as India, Malaya, Singapore, Burma, East Africa, and the United Kingdom—as clerks, professionals, educators, and seafarers, laying the foundations of later diaspora communities.

=== Post-independence ===
Since gaining independence from the United Kingdom in 1948, Sri Lanka has experienced several significant waves of emigration driven by economic, political and social factors. In the decades following independence, early emigrants included professionals and English‑educated elites who sought opportunities abroad, particularly in the United Kingdom, Australia, and New Zealand. From the 1980s onward, the outbreak and continuation of the Sri Lankan Civil War (1983–2009) contributed to a substantial outflow of Sri Lankans — especially Tamils — who settled as refugees and economic migrants in Canada, the United Kingdom, Europe, Australia, and other countries, forming a significant global diaspora. Emigration has also been shaped by controversial labour migration to the Middle East and other regions, with hundreds of thousands leaving Sri Lanka annually for employment opportunities overseas. In recent years, economic instability and labour market pressures have sustained high levels of outward migration, including skilled and unskilled workers seeking improved livelihoods abroad.

== Expatriate workers ==
Expatriate workers to Sri Lanka have been a valuable export for the country. The number of expatriate workers has been ever growing as well as the remittances they send back. In 2009 Sri Lankans sent home US$3.3 billion, a US$400 million increase from the year before. It is expected that 2010 would exceed US$4 billion. In mid-2010 there were more than 1.8 million Sri Lankan expatriate workers.

== Diaspora experience ==
=== Discrimination ===
In Australia, under the White Australia policy, immigration was negligible. It resumed after the Second World War primarily involving migration of Burghers, who fulfilled the then criteria that they should be of predominantly European ancestry and that their appearance should be European. Sinhalese migration began in the 1960s but it was after the mid-1970s that large groups arrived, which also included Christians and Buddhists. Sri Lankan students undertook courses in Australia as part of the Colombo Plan prior to the formal dismantling of the White Australia policy, and after 1973, Sinhalese, Tamil and Moor migration resumed.

=== Abuses against workers in the Middle East ===
Emigration from Sri Lanka to the Middle East has been a subject of public debate and controversy, driven by concerns over economic necessity, labor exploitation, and human rights. Many migrate to Gulf Cooperation Council countries and other Middle Eastern destinations in search of employment opportunities amid domestic unemployment and economic pressures. However, these movements have drawn criticism due to reports of exploitative recruitment practices, excessive fees, debt bondage, and workplace abuses, including long hours, non‑payment of wages, restrictions on movement, and physical or psychological mistreatment in host countries where labor protections are limited.

The process of labour migration from Sri Lanka to the Middle East has involved a complex network of intermediaries and political oversight, which has been the subject of criticism and reform efforts. Licensed and unlicensed recruitment agencies play a central role in facilitating the movement, but have faced allegations of irregular practices, high fees, and deceptive recruitment; prospective migrants are reported to incur significant debts to cover such costs, which can increase vulnerability to exploitation abroad.

Emigration to the Middle East has been a source of political controversy, with some political and commercial actors actively promoting it, while civil society and labour advocates raise strong objections. Entities, sometimes referred to as “middlemen,” along with politicians with economic or patronage interests, have encouraged continued labour migration to Gulf countries, publicly citing remittances and foreign exchange as financial benefits. Critics argue that such advocacy often prioritizes the financial gain of intermediaries over the welfare of migrants, many of whom are vulnerable to exploitation, abuse, and debt bondage. Civil society organisations, trade unions, and migrant advocacy groups have called for stricter regulation of recruitment agencies, safer migration practices, and domestic policy reforms to reduce dependency on hazardous overseas employment. The debate underscores a tension between short-term economic gains for intermediaries and the long-term social and human costs borne by migrant workers and their families.

=== Politics of immigration ===
Critics argue that such policies promoting emigration can prioritise short‑term financial gains at the expense of addressing structural issues such as unemployment, wage stagnation, and domestic labour market development.

== Distribution by continent ==
The Sri Lankan diaspora is distributed across all inhabited continents, with significant populations in the Asia, Europe, Oceania, Middle East and North America. The majority of Sri Lankans in the Middle East are temporary labour migrants, primarily employed under short-term contracts in Gulf countries such as the UAE, Qatar, and Saudi Arabia, and their presence fluctuates with employment cycles. In contrast, Sri Lankan communities in Europe, Oceania, and North America are largely permanent or long-term residents, often comprising families and second-generation immigrants who maintain strong cultural, economic, and social ties with Sri Lanka while being integrated into local societies.

=== Africa ===
==== Botswana ====
According to The United Nations, there were 110,596 international migrants in Botswana and in that number 992 of them were from Sri Lanka.

==== Libya ====
Libya's 2007 census says that there are over 15,010 workers from Sri Lanka. Sri Lankan Sinhalese make up two-thirds of the buddhist population of Libya.

==== Mauritius ====
Sri Lanka (Ceylon) and Mauritius were former British and Dutch colonies but the presence of Sri Lankans in Mauritius goes back to between 1819 and 1832 during the British Period when Sinhalese nobles were exiled to Mauritius from the result of the Kandyan wars. The total number of Mauritians with Sri Lankan descent is 5,000 which 80% of them are Sinhalese.

==== Seychelles ====
Sri Lankans make up around 2.5% of the population in the Seychelles where the number is at 2,200. It is said that the first Sri Lankans to reach the Seychelles was in 1967 where 6 fisherman from Sri Lanka came to the Seychelles on a sailing vessel. Today, many Sri Lankans in the Seychelles are working as professionals.

==== South Africa ====
During the era of The Dutch Empire, both Sri Lanka (Ceylon) and South Africa had its connection. In the 17th and 18th centuries, the Dutch brought slaves from Ceylon and those slaves mixed with the population. In the Cape during the early 18th century about half of the slaves came from India and Ceylon. The ethnic groups which have roots of descent from Ceylon are the Cape Malays and the Cape coloured. The number of Sri Lankans in South Africa is unknown.

==== Tanzania ====
Sri Lankan people have came to work in Tanzania during the British colonial rule of the early 20th Century. The workers from Sri Lanka (then Ceylon) established the first buddhist temple in the country.

=== Americas ===
==== Bermuda ====
In 1979 there were only six Sri Lankans living in Bermuda. As of 2005 there are an estimated 400 living and working there mainly as professionals

==== Canada ====
The spread of Sinhalese language in the United States

Sri Lankan Canadians include members from all ethnicities of Sri Lanka, they are mainly concentrated in the cities of Toronto and Montreal, in the provinces of Ontario and Quebec respectively. As of 2006 there are 103,625 Sri Lankans in Canada.

==== United States ====
There are tens of thousands of Sri Lankans in the United States from all different backgrounds. In the 1990s the number was about 14,448, however this has grown significantly. Sri Lankan American communities are mainly situated in large metropolitan areas. The New York City Metropolitan Area contains the largest Sri Lankan community in the United States, receiving the highest legal permanent resident Sri Lankan immigrant population, followed by Central New Jersey and the Los Angeles metropolitan area. The Little Sri Lanka in the Tompkinsville neighborhood of the borough of Staten Island in New York City is one of the largest Sri Lankan communities outside of the country of Sri Lanka itself.

=== Asia ===
==== India ====
There are an estimated 200,000 Sri Lankans in India, most of them being refugees. Nearly all of them are Sri Lankan Tamils but there are also a small amount of Sinhalese as well. Most Sri Lankans in India reside in and around the southern state of Tamil Nadu with some small populations in the big cities like Delhi and Chennai. The vast majority of the population however, mostly Sri Lankan Tamils, live in refugee camps due to the Sri Lankan Civil War.

==== Japan ====
As of December 2022 there were 37,251 Sri Lankan nationals residing in Japan.

==== Malaysia and Singapore ====
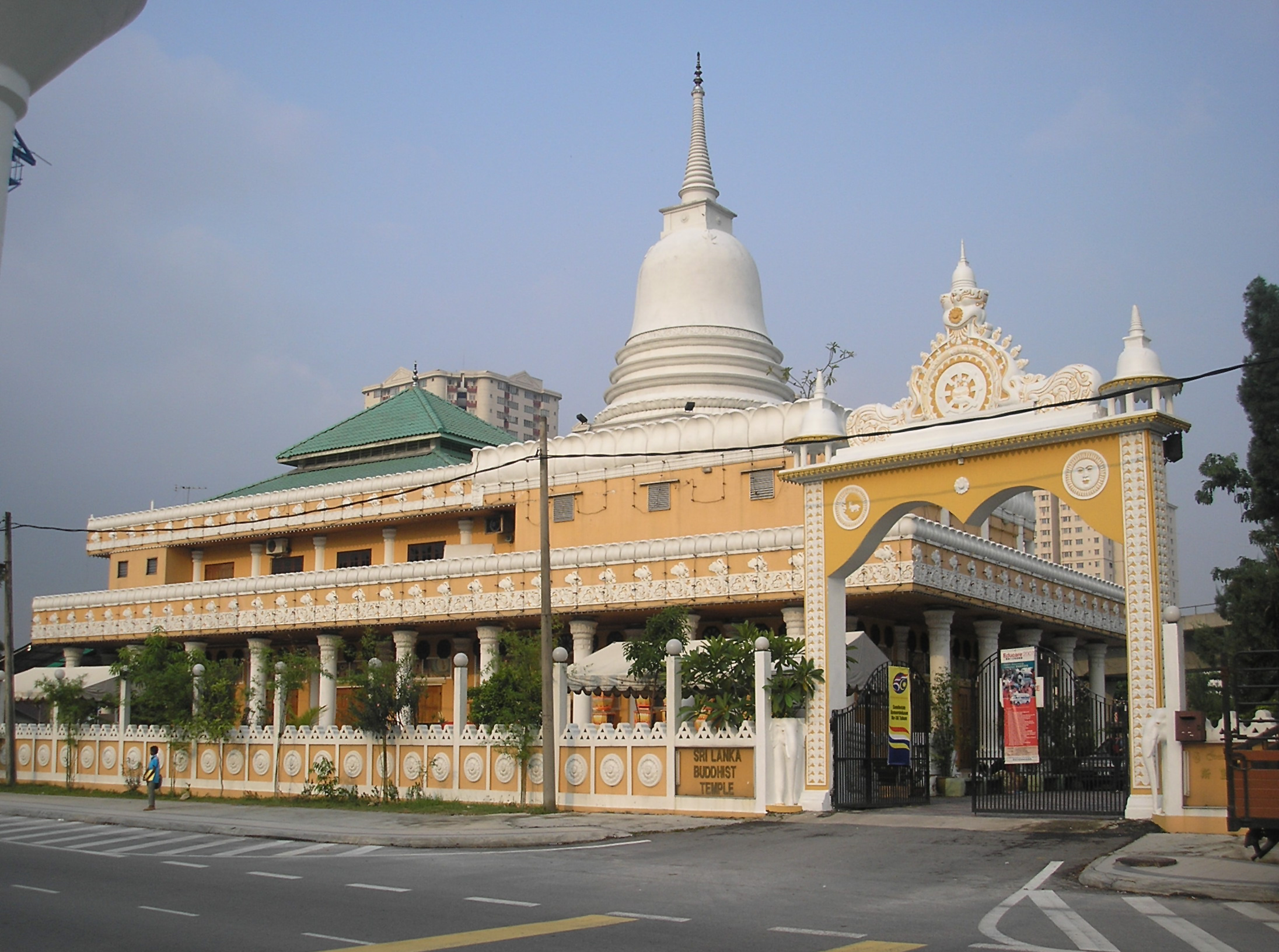
Sri Lanka Buddhist Temple (from Lorong Timur), Sentul, Kuala Lumpur

Ceylonese Tamils made up an overwhelming majority in the civil service of British Malaya and Singapore prior to independence. It was in Malaysia and Singapore, that the term Ceylonese and Jaffnese were popularly used by the Sri Lankan Tamils to differentiate themselves from the larger Malaysian Indian population who were predominantly of Tamil origin.

After the Pangkor Treaty of 1874, the British embarked upon the construction of roads, railways, schools, hospitals, and government offices in the Malay Peninsula, to develop the country and to increase its revenue.

"It was to meet those early problems that Malaya looked to its older sister Ceylon for help and probably, the then Governor of the Straits Settlements secured the despatch to Perak of the 2nd division of the Ceylon Pioneer Corp. "So it fell to the Ceylonese to survey the railways and to build and man them, to be apothecaries in the hospitals, to be technical assistants to qualified engineers and to staff the clerical services on which an expanding government was bound increasingly to depend.

In Kuala Lumpur, the Ceylon Tamil population was mainly concentrated in Brickfields and Sentul because of the proximity of the Administrative Centre of the Malayan Railway (opposite the railway station) and the Sentul Workshop. The Government provided accommodation for the white and the blue collar workers in these areas. The Ceylon Tamils living in both these areas were devout Saivites and as they fervently believed that "no one should live in a place that has no Temple", they soon began to organize themselves into Associations. This gave birth to the Sri Kandaswamy Kovil, Brickfields, which has become a landmark and tourist attraction in the city, showcasing Sri Lankan Tamil and Hindu architecture at its finest.

Many of the first Asian and non-white doctors and engineers in Malaya and Singapore were of Sri Lankan Tamil descent. The world's first Asian surgeon was Dr S.S. Thiruchelvam, a Malayan of Ceylonese Tamil origin.

Former Singaporean Prime Minister Lee Kuan Yew once said:

In terms of numbers, the Ceylonese, like the Eurasians, are among the smallest of our various communities. Yet in terms of achievements and contributions to the growth and development of the modern Singapore and Malaysia they have done more than warranted by their numbers. In the early days of Malaysia's and Singapore's history the civil service and the professions were manned by a good number of Ceylonese. Even today the Ceylonese community continues to play a prominent role in these and other fields of civil life.

For example in Singapore, today, the Speaker of Parliament is a Ceylonese. So is our High Commissioner in Great Britain. So is our Foreign Minister. In the Judiciary, in the civil service, in the university, in the medical Service and in the professions they continue to make substantial contributions out of all proportion to their numbers. They are there not because they are members of a minority community but on the basis of merit.

The point is that the Ceylonese are holding their own in open competition with communities far larger than them. They have asked for no special favour or consideration as a minority. What they have asked for – and quite rightly – is that they should be judged on their merits and that they be allowed to compete with all other citizens fairly and without discrimination. This, as far as the Singapore government is concerned, is what is best for all of us. I believe that the future belongs to that society which acknowledges and rewards ability, drive and high performance without regard to race, language or religion.

The Ceylonese community established many schools, banks, cultural societies, cooperatives and temples in Malaysia and Singapore. Some good examples would be the Jaffnese Cooperative Society, Vivekananda Ashrama and the Vivekananda Tamil School in Brickfields, Kuala Lumpur. In 1958 The Malaysian Ceylonese Congress was established as a political party with the aim of giving support to the then Alliance party. MCC has continuously supported the Barisan Nasional and the Government. It was formed to promote and preserve the Political, Educational, Social and Cultural aspects of the Malaysian Ceylonese Community. To date MCC has seen six presidents:

1. Mr. M.W Navaratnam AMN, JP (1958–1969)
2. Senator Tan Sri Datuk Dr. C.Sinnadurai PSD, PNBS, DPMP, MN, SMK, SMB, PJK (1970–1983)
3. Tan Sri Dato' Seri V.Jeyaratnam PSM, SPM, STP, JP (1983–1987)
4. Dato' Dr N.Arumugasamy DSIJ, JSM (1988–1995)
5. Dato' Dr D.M.Thuraiappah SPM, AMN, ASA (1996–2003)
6. Dato 'Dr NKS Tharmaseelan DPTJ, PMC, ANS (2004 – present)

Today MCC under the leadership of Dato Dr NKS Tharmaseelan. After 50 years MCC was formally registered with the Malaysian Election's Commission (SPR) on 27 February 2009.

Many Ceylonese were also involved in the independence movements in Malaya and Singapore. In Singapore, there are many current and past ministers who are of Ceylonese Tamil in origin and Tamil is a national language. Sinnathamby Rajaratnam was the former foreign minister and deputy prime minister of Singapore and regarded as one of the founding fathers of Singapore. His death in 2006 was marked with a state funeral by the government of Singapore. The Singapore flag was flown at half mast at all public buildings and former Prime Minister and friend Lee Kuan Yew cried when giving his eulogy.

Even today, members of the Sri Lankan community in Malaysia and Singapore take up professional and government posts. One of Malaysia's and South East Asia's richest men is billionaire Tan Sri Ananda Krishnan, who regularly makes it to Forbes magazine's billionaire list.

==== Philippines ====
According to the 2010 census, there are about 146 Sri Lankan expats in the Philippines. During the age of Spanish colonialism in the Philippines, Sri Lankans were used as imported slave labour and those slaves interacted with the Minnanese, Tagalogs and Kampaganans of Central Luzon.

=== Middle East ===
Sri Lankans generally go to the Middle East to find work. For Sri Lankans Saudi Arabia is the largest "unskilled and semi-skilled labour" importing country, ahead of Qatar, Kuwait and the United Arab Emirates.

==== Lebanon ====
As of 2025, there were around 7600 Sri Lankans in Lebanon. There is a large domestic labour population in Lebanon.

==== Qatar ====
As of 2016 December, there are 145,256 Sri Lankans living and working in Qatar.

==== Saudi Arabia ====
As of 2007 there were approximately 400,000 Sri Lankans in Saudi Arabia. During January 2010 up until October 56,000 workers have left for Saudi Arabia, however thousands have run away or escaped from their employers due to ill-treatment or when found that they had been duped by unscrupulous job agents.

==== United Arab Emirates ====
There are an estimated population of over 300,000 they mostly form the country's large foreign labour force. Most expatriates from Sri Lanka, along with other immigrants from the Indian subcontinent, tend to be found in Dubai, although sizeable communities are existent in Abu Dhabi, Sharjah, Al-Ain and Ras al-Khaimah.

=== Europe ===
==== Denmark ====
Denmark has 11,700 Sri Lankans residing in its borders as of 2017. Additionally 2,593 Sri Lankan nationals were living in Denmark as of 2010.

==== France ====
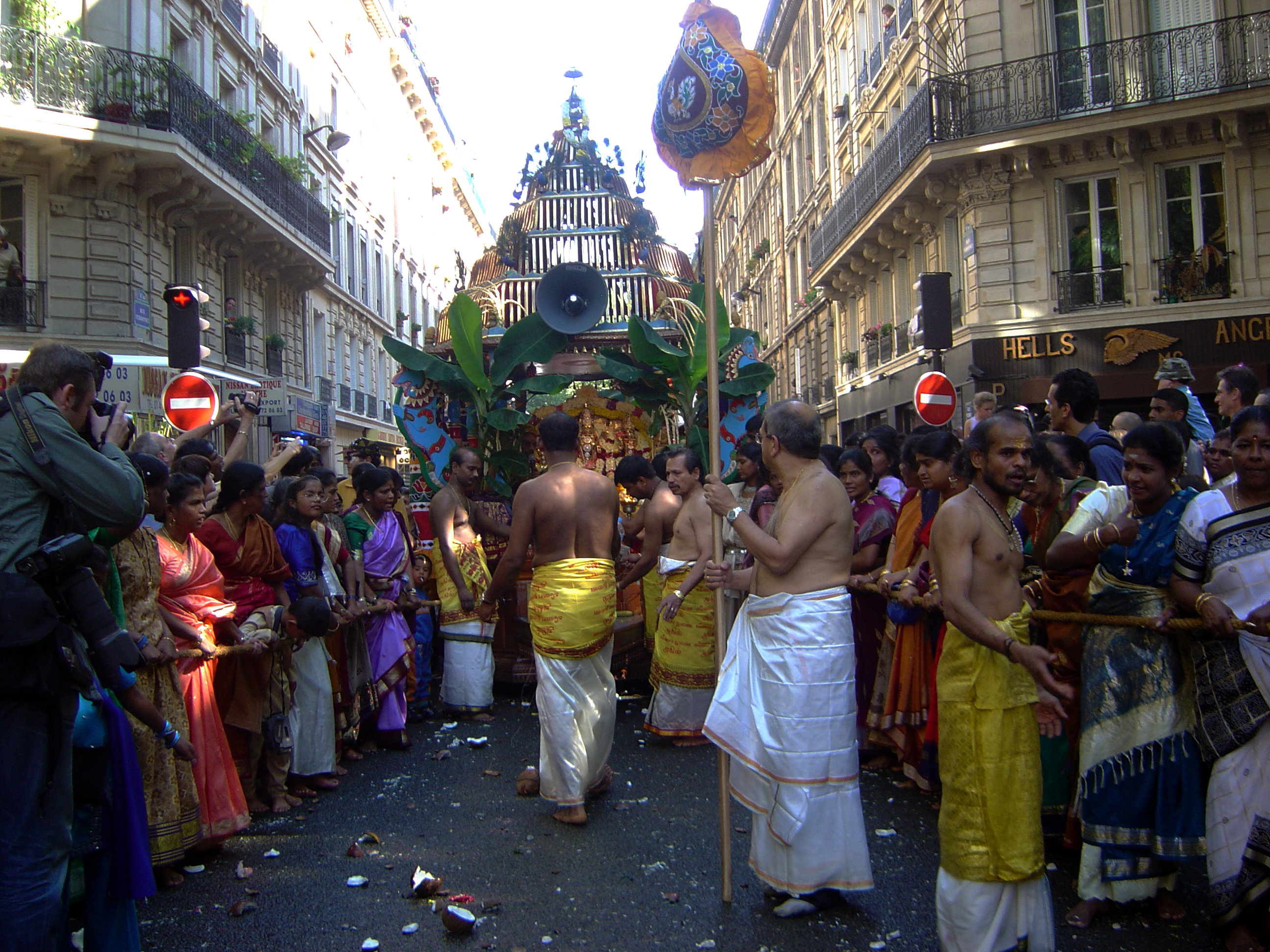
Celebrations of Ganesh by the Sri Lankan Tamil community in Paris, France

As of 2017 estimation, there are 52,300 Sri Lankan born population live in France. In only 10 years, "Little Jaffna", located at the last stretch of the winding street of Rue du Faubourg Saint-Denis in the 10th arrondissement, between metros Gare du Nord and La Chapelle, has sprung to life and begun to truly flourish. It is commonly mistakenly called by the average Parisian as Little Bombay.

The vast majority of Parisian Tamils fled Sri Lanka as refugees in the 1980s, escaping the violent civil conflict. The French Prefecture was initially quite reluctant about granting asylum to Tamils. In 1987, the Office for the Protection of Refugees (OFPRA) gained in power and opened up a period of nearly systematic asylum. This liberal period eventually tapered off in the 90s as a result of new European measures designed against an influx in immigration. Little Jaffna is also famous for the annual chariot procession held during Ganesha Chathurthi. Both the area and event have become popular tourist attractions.

==== Germany ====
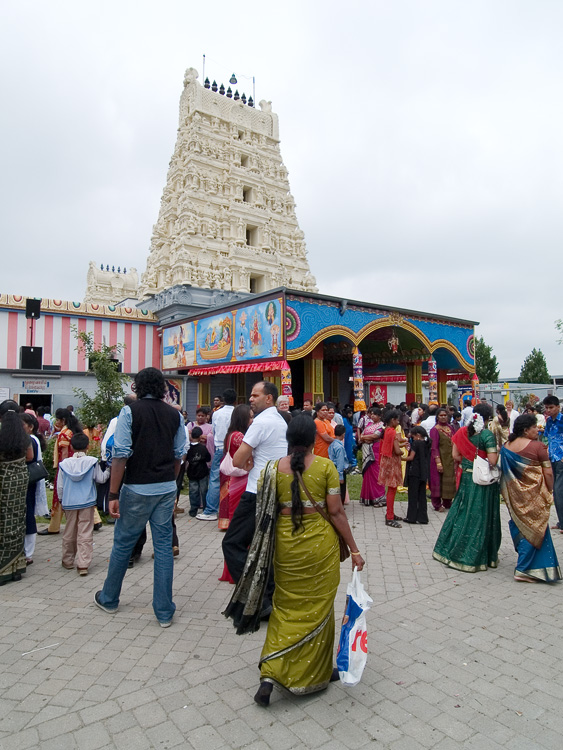
Sri Kamadchi Ampal temple in Hamm, Germany

There are about 25,900 Sri Lankans living Germany as of 2019.

Religious fervor among Tamil Germans intensified as their numbers swelled. Due to the inspirational encouragement of Hawaii Subramaniaswami – the disciple of Yoga Swamigal – two well-organized Hindu temples – Sidhivinayagar Kovil and the kamadchi Amman Kovil – having place in the city of Hamm since 1984. According to the journal Hinduism Today, the youth are being well trained in their religion and culture at home and in weekend schools in rented halls using texts from Sri Lanka. They even wear Hindu symbols of Vibuthi and Tilakam.

The second and third generations of Tamils have integrated very well into the German society, contributing in all skilled professions. Tamils are known as hard workers. The identity of Hindus can be seen in city Hamm, where the temple was built with 17-meter-high Gopuram and the layout rebuilt in Germany after Kamadchi-Ampal Temple in South India.

==== Italy ====
It is estimated that there are 113,705 Sinhalese in Italy in 2025 according to the latest Istat data. In addition, 23,589 Sri Lankans have acquired Italian citizenship from 2008 to 2024. Do to their being Italian citizens and as Italy doesn't collect data on its citizens ethnicity, the total population of people of Sri Lankan recent ancestry living in the European country can be estimated at around 140,000 people, not accounting for mixed Sri Lankan-Italian people or people of Sri Lankan descent born with an Italian passport. For instance, between 2004 and 2024 there were 625 Italian-Sri Lankan marriages registered in Italy: in 55.84% of cases it was an Italian man marrying a Sri Lankan woman. Sociologist Enrica Morlicchio estimated in 1992 that 2/3 of the Sri Lankan population in Italy was Sinhalese and Tamils constituted 1/3.

There have been sources of Sri Lankan presence in Italy since the Roman times as according to historian Pliny, 4 people from Sri Lanka was said to have visited the court of Emperor Claudius in AD 50 while another delegation was sent from Sri Lanka to Rome under the reign of Emperor Julian in 375 AD. There were strong links between the two countries and Sri Lanka was known as 'Taprobane' to the Romans.

Many Sinhalese have migrated to Italy since the 1970s. Italy was attractive to the Sinhalese due to perceived easier employment opportunities and entry, compared to other European countries. In the late 70's, Sinhalese Catholic women migrated to Italy to work in elderly homes. This was followed by a wave of Sinhalese migrants who worked for Italian entrepreneurs in the early 80s. The first immigration waves during the second half of the Eighties consisted mainly of Tamils, followed by Sinhalese at the beginning of the 1990s. Italy was often seen as a temporary destination, but many Sinhalese decided to settle there. Many Sinhalese have also illegally migrated to Italy, mainly through the Balkans and Austria.

Admission acts also encouraged more Sinhalese to migrate to Italy. For example, the Dini Decree in 1996 made it more easier for Sinhalese workers to bring their family to Italy. In Rome, Naples and Milan, the Sinhalese have built up "enlarged families", where jobs are exchanged among relatives and compatriots.

The major Sinhalese communities in Italy are located in Lombardia (notably in Milan, in the districts Loreto and Lazzaretto), Lazio (Rome) and Southern Italy (particularly Naples, Palermo, Messina and Catania). Most Italian Sinhalese work as domestic workers but they have also opened businesses such as restaurants, cleaning enterprises (e.g. Cooperativa Multietnica di Pulizie Sud-Est), call centres, video-shops, traditional food shops and minimarkets. Nadeesha Uyangoda is a Sri Lanka-born journalist who has called for second-generation Italian immigrants to be better represented at all levels of politics.

The Sinhalese prefer to send their children to English speaking countries for their education and consider Italian education mediocre. The major organisation representing the Sinhalese in Italy is the Sri Lanka Association Italy. Smaller community and political organisation exist in areas with a sizable Sri Lankan population such as the Sri Lanka Association Florence, Coordinamento Tamil, Centro Culturale Tamil, Sri Lanka Women's Association Napoli and Associazione dei Tamil in Italia. Several other organizations are based in cities including Naples, Bologna, Lecce, Reggio Emilia etc.

The Sri Lanka - Italy Business Council - Ceylon Chamber of Commerce is an organization in Italy for promoting investment, trade and joint venture between the two countries.

==== Netherlands ====
In 2017, there were 12,696 Sri Lankans in the Netherlands, with just over 5,700 of them second generation Sri Lankans in the Netherlands. There were 5,500 men and a thousand less women in 2010.

==== Norway ====
As of 1 January 2010 Statistics Norway recorded 13,772 Sri Lankans living in Norway, an increase of 339 from the year before. The capital city Oslo is home to about 7,000 Sri Lankans while Norway's second largest city Bergen has about a thousand Sri Lankan residents.

==== Romania ====
In December 2023, it was reported that Romania has attracted increased numbers of immigrants from South Asia, including Nepalis and Sri Lankans. Sri Lankans in Romania made up the second largest expatriate force of non-European Union origin, with a total of 15,807 people.

==== Sweden ====
Sweden has a Sri Lankan population of about 6,733 as of 2010. There were 2,948 men and 3,774 women.

==== Switzerland ====
There are about 46,000 to 55,000 Swiss of Sri Lankan origin and Sri Lankan expatriates are living in Switzerland, with around 32,000 to 42,000 home to Sri Lanka Tamils.

==== Turkey ====
As of 2024, Turkish Statistical Institute recorded 1,825 Sri Lankans living in Turkey, an increase of 234 from the year before.

==== United Kingdom ====
Sri Lankans have been migrating to Britain for several generations, up from the time of British ruled Ceylon (started in the 19th century). They include Sri Lankans of all ethnicities and backgrounds and boast a large population in the country. In 2021, the estimated population of the UK born in Sri Lanka was 131,000. Most Sri Lankans live in London, South East England, East England and The Midlands. However, the number of people of Sri Lankan descent might be around 300,000-400,000.

=== Oceania ===
==== Australia ====
The 2006 Census in Australia found that there were approximately 29,055 Sinhalese Australians (0.1 percent of the population). That was an addition of 8,395 Sinhalese Australians (a 40.6 percent increase) from the 2001 Census. There are 73,849 Australians (0.4 of the population) who reported having Sinhalese ancestry in 2006. This was 26 percent more in 2001, in which 58,602 Australia reported having Sinhalese ancestry. The census is counted by Sri Lankans who speak the Sinhalese language at home.

Half of all Sri Lankan Australians (78,687) live in Melbourne, mainly in the South-eastern Suburbs, according to the 2021 Census

==== New Zealand ====
The early arrivals to come to New Zealand from what was then British Ceylon were a few prospectors attracted to the gold rushes. By 1874 there were a mere 33 New Zealand residents born in Ceylon.

The numbers arriving continued to increase, and at the 2013 census there were over 11,000 Sri Lankans living in New Zealand.

Sri Lankan New Zealanders comprised 3% of the Asian population of New Zealand in 2001. Out of the Asians, the Sri Lankans were the most likely to hold a formal qualification and to work in white-collar occupations. Sri Lankans mainly worked in health professions, business and property services, and the retail and manufacturing sectors, in large numbers. Most lived in Auckland and Wellington, with smaller populations in Waikato, Manawatū, Canterbury and others.

== Returning ==
Sri Lankan expatriates have a low rate of return migration to Sri Lanka, even though many continue to maintain close ties with their home country. Though there have been cases where most migrated back to their homeland at least some point in their life.

== Notable members of the diaspora ==
- List of Sri Lankan Americans
- List of Sri Lankan Australians
- List of Sri Lankan Britons
- List of Sri Lankan Canadians
- List of Sri Lankan Indians
- List of Sri Lankans in Singapore
- List of Sri Lankan New Zealanders

== See also ==
- Sinhalese Diaspora
- List of Sri Lanka Tamils for more members of the diaspora
