= Ti-Ratana Welfare Society =

Ti-Ratana Welfare Society Persatuan Kebajikan Ti-Ratana 慈愛福利中心
- Founded: 1994
- Founder: Most Venerable K. Sri Dhammaratana
- Type: Non-governmental organisation
- Registration no.: 1811/94 (PPM-001-14-09021994)
- Purpose: Orphanage Homes, Old Folks Homes, Women Shelter, Community Centers, Mobile Clinics
- Location: Kuala Lumpur, Malaysia
- Method: Provide shelter, education and care to the underprivileged members of the community, ie. children/orphans, women & senior citizen.
- Website: www.ti-ratana.org.my

Ti-Ratana Welfare Society is one of the largest independent, voluntary, not-for-profit NGOs based in Kuala Lumpur, Malaysia. It is locally known and registered as "Persatuan Kebajikan Ti-Ratana"; while its Chinese name is 慈愛福利中心.

The society runs three children's homes with over 250 children, two senior residences with about 50 senior citizens, a shelter home for women, and mobile clinics that provide free medical services to people in rural areas.

== History ==
Ti-Ratana Welfare Society was founded by The Most Ven. Datuk K. Sri Dhammaratana and registered on 9 February 1994. The name is a reference to Three Jewels.

In 1996, a three-storey building was acquired through the generosity of a donor and the Ti-Ratana Children's Home was officially opened by the National Unity and Social Welfare Minister YB Datuk Paduka Hajjah Zaleha bte Ismail on 21 June 1997.

The Society is now located in Salak South Bahru (Desa Petaling), Kuala Lumpur, Malaysia.

== Organisation structure ==
- Founder & Adviser: Most Venerable K. Sri Dhammaratana (current Chief High Priest of Malaysia)
- President: Datuk Seri Dr. KK Chai
- A board of committee members to oversee the operation of Ti-Ratana. The committee members meet frequently to discuss operational tasks, plan activities and determine budgets.
- Volunteers, helpers
- A separate affiliated society, Ti-Ratana Buddhist Society, was set up in 2000 to promote the welfare society along with Humanistic Buddhism

== Funding ==
The society is supported by donations from individuals, corporations and substantial from within Malaysia & surrounding countries.

== Activities ==
- Free medical service for senior citizen/children in rural area
- Free workshops for school children to help them prepare for national examinations (PMR/SPM)
- Annual fund raising charity dinner, family day fun fair, etc.
- Weekly meditation classes at Ti-Ratana Community centre
