= Malaysian Buddhist Institute =

Malaysian Buddhist Institute 馬來西亞佛學院 Mǎ Lái Xī Yà Fó Xué Yuàn Institut Buddha Malaysia
- Type: Private
- Established: 18 September 1969
- President: Venerable Chuk Mor (Chinese: 竺摩; pinyin: Zhú Mó; Jyutping: Zuk1 Mo1; Pe̍h-ōe-jī: Tiok Mô͘ )
- Location: 182, Burma Road, Penang, Malaysia
- Colours: Yellow, red and white
- Website: www.mbi.edu.my

Malaysian Buddhist Institute
- Traditional Chinese: 馬來西亞佛學院
Transcriptions
Standard Mandarin
- Hanyu Pinyin: Mǎ Lái Xī Yà Fó Xué Yuàn
Yue: Cantonese
- Jyutping: Maa5 Loi4 Sai1 Aa3 Fat6 Hok6 Jyun6
Southern Min
- Hokkien POJ: Má-lâi-se-a Hu̍t-ha̍k-īⁿ
- Tâi-lô: Má-lâi-se-a Hu̍t-ha̍k-īnn

The Malaysian Buddhist Institute (Chinese: 馬來西亞佛學院; pinyin: Mǎ Lái Xī Yà Fó Xué Yuàn; Pe̍h-ōe-jī: Má-lâi-se-a Hu̍t-ha̍k-īⁿ; Malay: Institut Buddha Malaysia) is a Buddhist institute of higher education providing formal training in the Chinese language to prepare candidates for the sangha orders in the Mahayana tradition. It is located in Penang, Malaysia. Established on September 18, 1969, through the efforts of the Venerable Chuk Mor (Chinese: 竺摩; pinyin: Zhú Mó; Jyutping: Zuk1 Mo1; Pe̍h-ōe-jī: Tiok Mô͘ ), the institute is under the auspices of the Malaysian Buddhist Association.

== See also ==
- Buddhism in Malaysia
- Education in Malaysia
