= K. Sri Dhammananda =

Sri Lankan Buddhist monk (1919–2006)

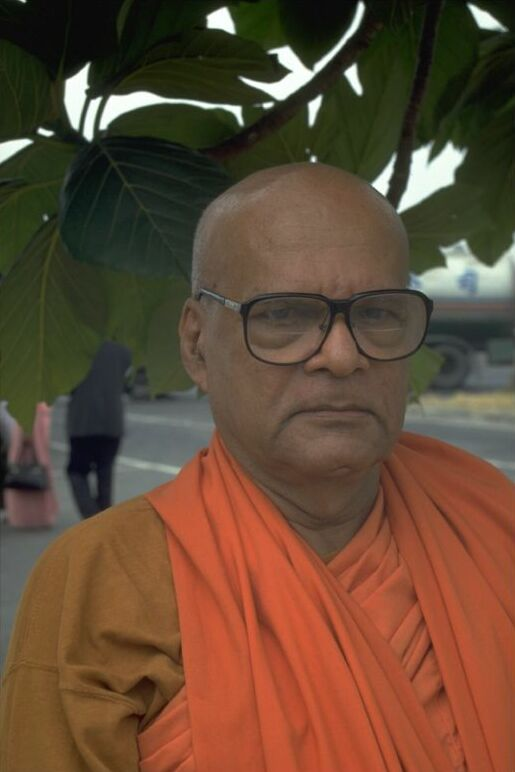
- Title: First Buddhist Chief High Priest of Malaysia (1963–2006)

Personal life
- Born: Martin Garmage; 18 March 1919 Matara, British Ceylon
- Died: 31 August 2006 (aged 87) Subang Jaya Medical Centre, Subang Jaya, Malaysia
- Education: Banaras Hindu University

Religious life
- Religion: Buddhism
- School: Theravada

Senior posting
- Based in: Kuala Lumpur, Malaysia
- Successor: Kirinde Sri Dhammaratana

K. Sri Dhammananda (born Martin Gamage, 18 March 1919 – 31 August 2006) was a Sri Lankan Buddhist monk and scholar. He was an especially prominent figure for Buddhism in Malaysia.

== Biography ==
Dhammananda was born in southern Sri Lanka. He moved to the Federation of Malaya, now Malaysia, in January 1952 to administer to the needs of the Buddhist community in the country.

In 1963, Dhammananda established the Buddhist Missionary Society. Through it, he disseminated short essays and periodicals that depicted Buddhism as being compatible with modern science.

As of 1980, Dhammananda was the head monk of the Buddhist Maha Vihara in Kuala Lumpur. That year, he supported several patrons of the Buddhist Maha Vihara with starting the Buddhist Gem Fellowship, an English-speaking pan-Buddhist organisation aimed at promoting the growth of Buddhism in Malaysia. He was the Buddhist Chief High Priest of Malaysia and Singapore, and wrote over 47 books on Buddhism, which were translated into multiple languages.

Dhammananda died on 31 August 2006 at the Subang Jaya Medical Centre in Selangor, Malaysia. It was claimed that there were auspicious signs including lights and auras around the funeral site.

Buddhist titles
Preceded by none	Honorary President of the World Fellowship of Buddhists; Served alongside: Hsing Yun; 1995–2006	Succeeded by Ven. Hsing Yun
