= Institute of Business Administration, University of Rajshahi =

Institute of Business Administration (IBA-RU)
- ব্যবসা প্রশাসন ইনস্টিটিউট,(আইবিএ,রাবি)
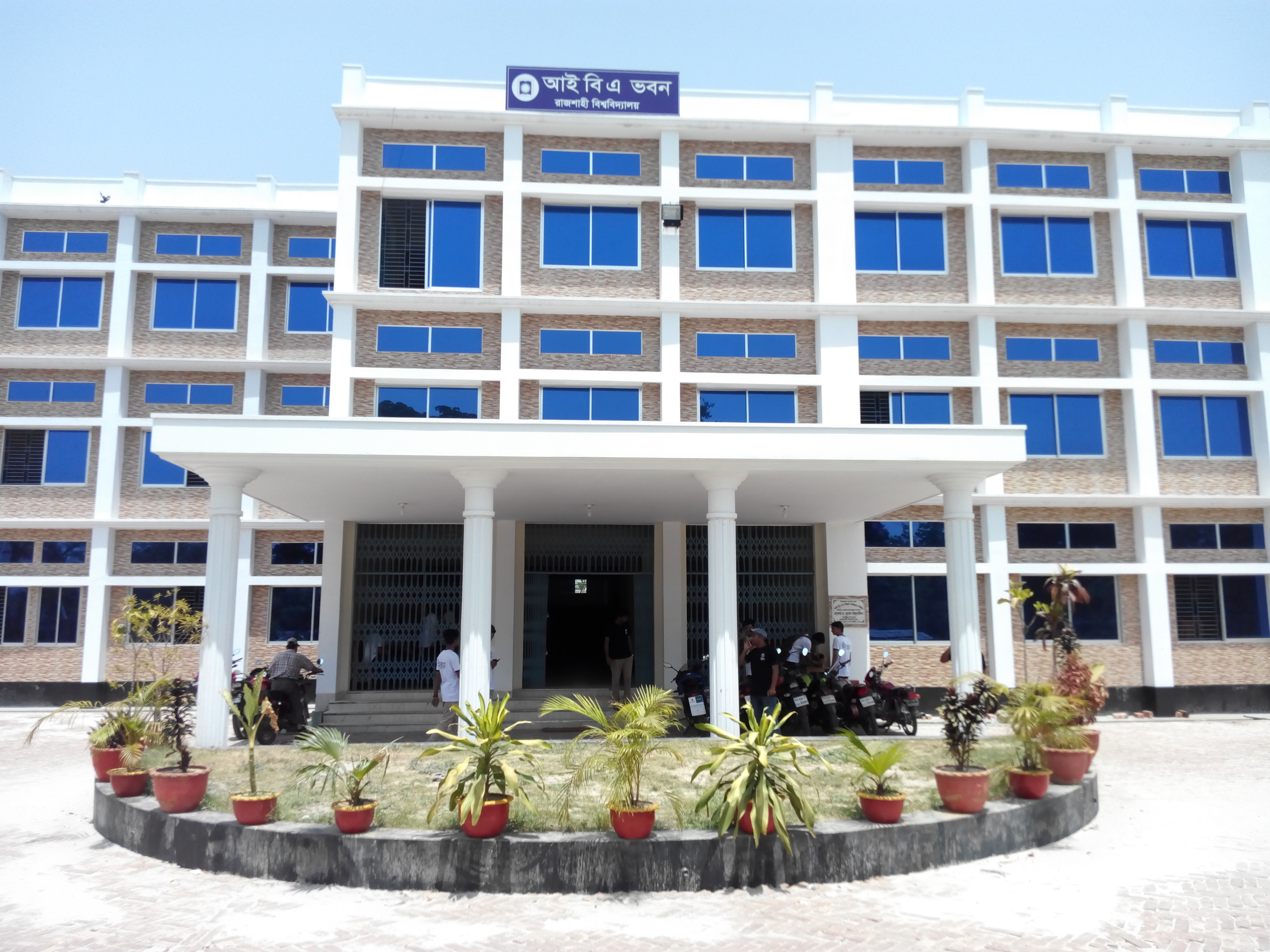
- Type: Business school
- Established: 2000
- Director: Prof. Md. Shariful Islam
- Academic staff: 25
- Undergraduates: 210
- Postgraduates: 200
- Location: Rajshahi, Bangladesh
- Campus: Urban
- Website: www.iba-ru.ac.bd

The Institute of Business Administration (Bengali: ব্যবসায় প্রশাসন ইনস্টিটিউট) of the University of Rajshahi, commonly known as IBA-RU, is a business school in Bangladesh.

== History ==
This is The Institute of Business Administration (IBA) is one of the five Institutes of Rajshahi University. The Institute of Business Administration of Rajshahi University is the second of its type at public universities in Bangladesh. IBA of Dhaka University has set an example of academic excellence in Bangladesh. IBA of Rajshai University also set goal to achieve a prestigious position in the country and beyond. But the task is not so easy. It is the duty of us who are the front liners, to make our IBA a symbol of prestige of Rajshahi University It started its journey as an institute in the year 2000. Academic activities of the institute began in 2002 with the inception of MBA (Evening) program. At present the institute has four streams of MBA program and another stream of M.Phil./ Ph.D. program. Most of the students of this program are mid level and top-level executives in private sector and state owned organizations. They are the proud members of the IBA of Rajshahi A Site. The BBA program was started in 2015 at the institute.

== Academic programs ==
The institute is currently running the following programs:

=== Undergraduate programs ===
- BBA

=== Graduates programs ===
- MBA (for BBA Graduates)
- MBA (for Non-BBA Graduates)
- Executive MBA (Weekends)
- MPhil
- PhD
