= Institute of Business Administration =

Institute for Business Administration may refer to:

- Institute of Business Administration, Karachi, Pakistan
- Institute of Business Administration, University of Dhaka, Bangladesh
- Institute of Business Administration, Jahangirnagar University, Bangladesh
- Institute of Business Administration, University of Rajshahi, Bangladesh
- Institute of Business Administration, Sukkar, Sindh, Pakistan, not affiliated with IBA Karachi
- Army Institute of Business Administration, Savar, Bangladesh
