= Karmapa International Buddhist Institute =

Buddhist school in India

Karmapa International Buddhist Institute (also known as K.I.B.I. or KIBI) is a school of higher learning based on the great treatises of Buddhism.

KIBI was founded by the 16th Gyalwa Karmapa and the 14th Kunzig Shamarpa with the goal of training scholars and introducing lay Buddhist practitioners to classic Buddhist texts of the Karma Kagyu tradition of Tibetan Buddhism and the Tibetan and Sanskrit languages. Since 1990 the KIBI has offered a 4-year program that awards undergraduate and graduate degrees in Buddhist Studies.

KIBI is currently under the direction of the 17th Gyalwa Karmapa and is located in the Qutab Institutional Area in New Delhi, India.

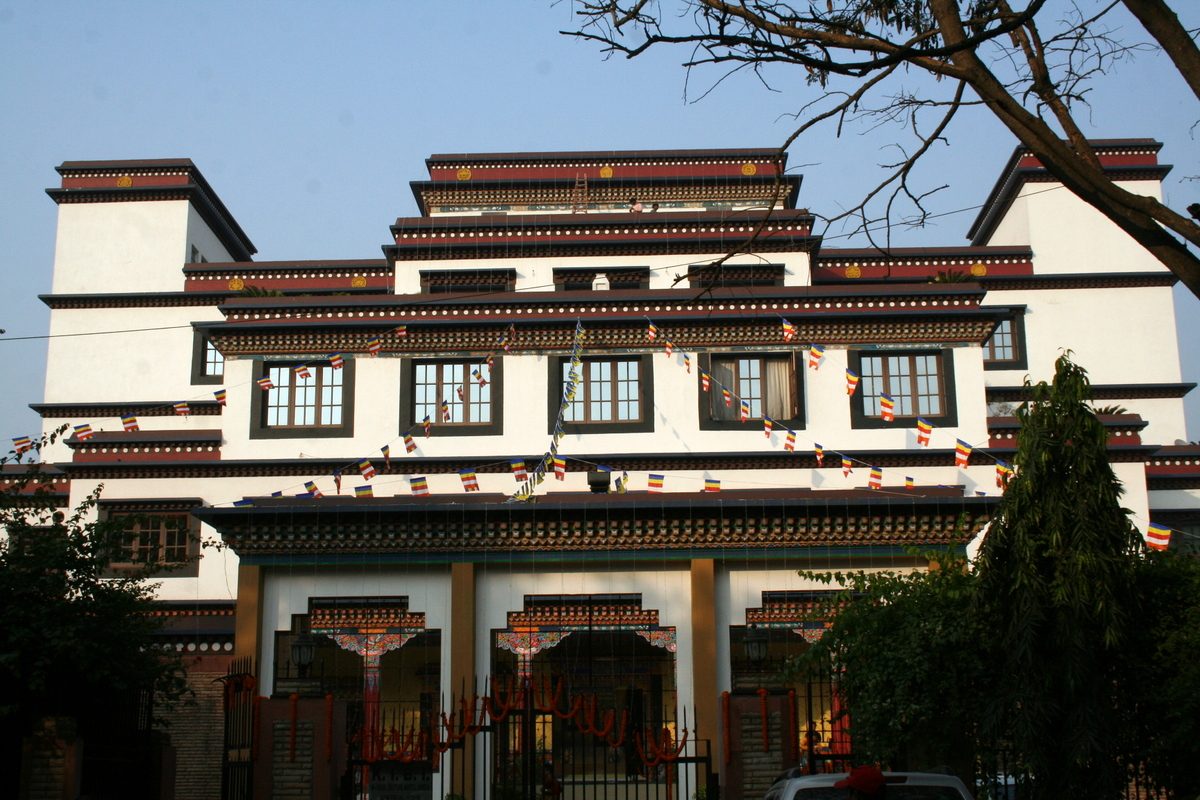
Karmapa International Buddhist Institute in Delhi
