= International Buddhist Academy =

Coordinates: 27.7289°N 85.3700°E

The International Buddhist Academy (IBA) is an academy of Buddhist philosophy situated in the Boudha area of Kathmandu, Nepal. The academy was founded in 2001 by the Venerable Khenchen Appey Rinpoche in order to preserve, study and translate primarily Tibetan Buddhist texts. The academy is home to a number of monks and nuns, and can accommodate students who come from around the world for the summer courses. Khenpo Ngawang Jorden is the director.

IBA is also home to the Chodung Karmo Translation Group which aims to translate texts from the Abhidharma, Prajnaparamita, Madhyamaka, Pramana, Yogacara, and Three Vows collections.

== See also ==
- Sakya Trizin
