= Buddhist Maha Vihara, Brickfields =

Theravadin Buddhist temple in Brickfields, Kuala Lumpur, Malaysia

Buddhist Maha Vihara
- Malay: Kuil Buddha Maha Vihara; Sinhala: බෞද්ධ මහා විහාරය; Chinese: 十五碑锡兰佛寺
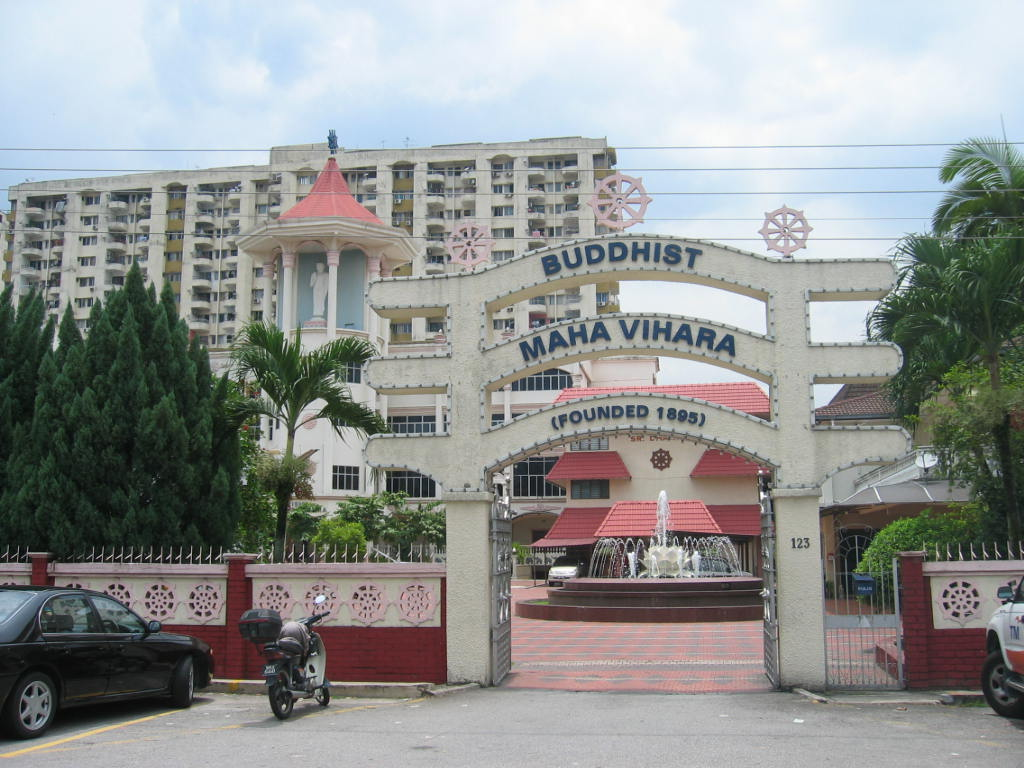
- Front view of the temple gate

Religion
- Affiliation: Buddhism
- Governing body: Malaysian Buddhist Consultative Council
- Patron: Ven Datuk Kirinde Sri Dhammaratana
- Status: Active

Location
- Location: Brickfields, Kuala Lumpur
- State: Kuala Lumpur
- Country: Malaysia
- Interactive map of Buddhist Maha Vihara
- Administration: Sasana Abhiwurdhi Wardhana Society
- Coordinates: 3°7′40.395″N 101°41′12.527″E

Architecture
- Type: Sri Lankan temple
- Founder: Patthalagedera Dhammananda Thera
- Established: 1895

Website
- www.buddhistmahavihara.org

Buddhist Maha Vihara (Sinhala: මහින්ද්රා බෞද්ධ පන්සල) (also called as the Brickfields Buddhist Temple) is a Sri Lankan temple situated in Brickfields of Kuala Lumpur in Malaysia. The temple became a focal point for the annual Wesak festival within the city suburb.

== History ==
After the establishment of the first Sinhalese temple in 1889 in Taiping, Perak, a second temple was proposed by the Sinhalese community in 1894 to be construct in an area within the administration capital of Kuala Lumpur where large numbers of their community civil servants are living and working. Facing financial difficulties to acquire a land, the community then appeal to the British government through English engineer C.E. Spooner a close ally of the Sinhalese community. The British government responded to the request but said any land in the administration capital intended for public service can only be granted towards an organisation. After a thorough discussion among the Sinhalese community, they agreed to form an organisation called the Sāsana Abhiwurdhi Wardhana Society which was also responsible to resolve social issues among their community with a foundation stone for the temple shrine room being laid down on 25 August 1894.

Through the inaugural meeting among the community, they agreed that the appointment of the temple abbot should be from British Ceylon and the temple administration would be under the Sinhalese. A living quarters was then built to house the first monk Patthalagedera Dhammananda Thera and his student Godagama Sobhita Thera from British Ceylon who later arrived in 1895 which also marked the foundation of the temple in the same year; despite the structure was only completed in the first decade of the 20th century. Although the temple management is controlled by the Sinhalese, a donor list published by the temple management showed that local Chinese Buddhists also donated money during the temple construction; the largest donation coming from Chinese Kapitan of Kuala Lumpur, Yeap Quang Seng. Since 1920, many Chinese devotees is now associated with the temple.

== Features ==
Since its foundation the Sāsana Abhiwurdhi Wardhana Society is responsible for the administration of the temple and all activities conducted on site. Religious activities are annually organised by the society.

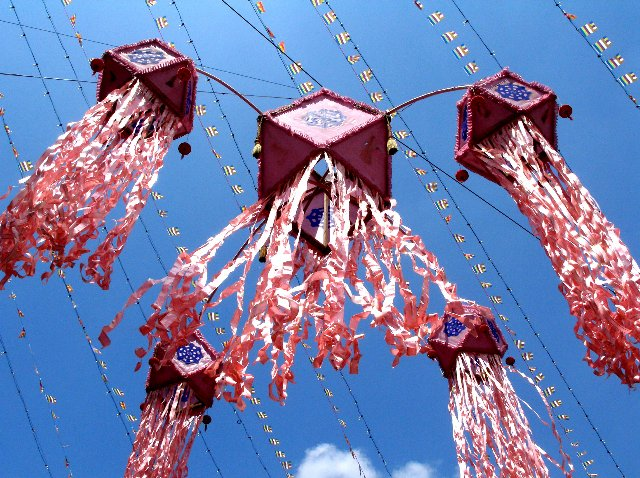
Decorations at the temple during Wesak in 2006.

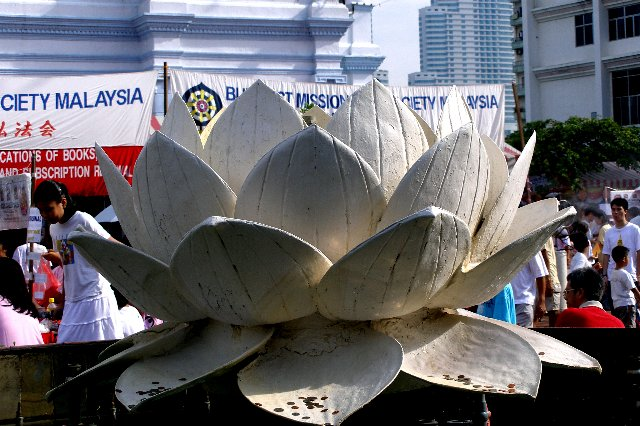
Lotus flower decoration at the temple during Wesak in 2007.

== News articles ==
- "Devotees, tourists observe Wesak Day at 125-year-old Buddhist temple". New Straits Times (online). 19 May 2019.
