= K. Sri Dhammaratana =

Malaysian Buddhist monk (born 1948)

The Most Venerable Datuk K. Sri Dhammaratana
- 拿督达摩拉达那长老
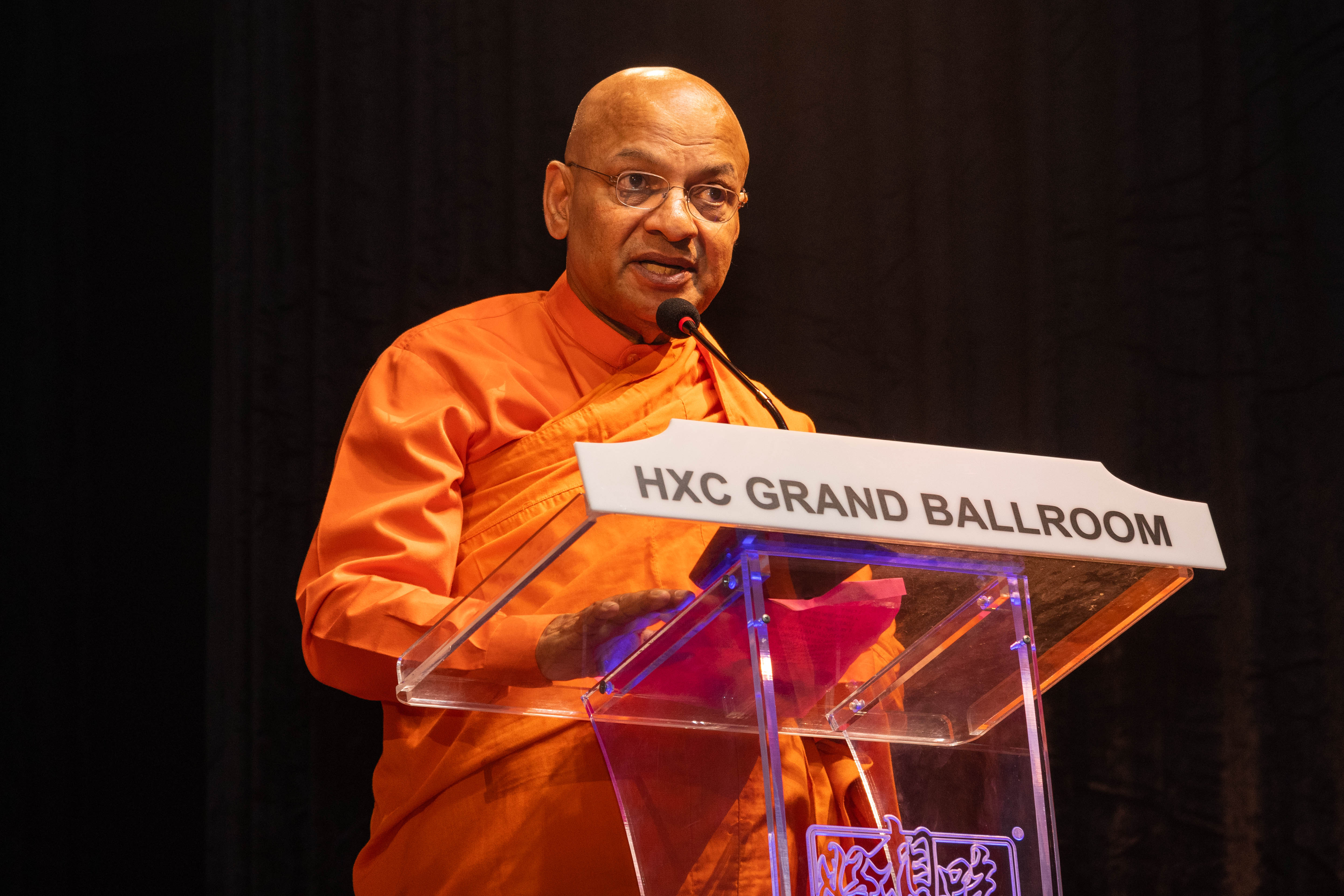
- Dhammaratana providing the opening speech at Ti-Ratana Welfare Society's 21st Anniversary Celebration on 12 January 2019
- Born: 24 July 1948 (age 77); Kirinde, Ceylon
- Education: Deiyandara National College
- Alma mater: Parama Buddhist International University
- Known for: Welfare Projects and Community Outreach
- Title: Buddhist Chief High Priest of Malaysia
- Predecessor: K. Sri Dhammananda

Kirinde Sri Dhammaratana (born 24 July 1948) is a Sri Lanka-born Buddhist monk and the incumbent Buddhist Chief High Priest of Malaysia since the passing of his predecessor, K. Sri Dhammananda, in 2006.

== Early life ==
Like his predecessor, he was born in the village of Kirinde in Matara, Sri Lanka on 24 July 1948, the second of five children of Basnayaka Mudiyanselage Siriwardena, an Ayurvedic physician, and Withanaarachchilage Dayawathie. He completed his secondary education at the Central College of Deyiyandara. Immediately after graduating, he entered monastic life as a novice monk taking the name Kirinde Dhammaratana under the guidance of Venerable Kotawila Sri Deepananda Nayaka Thero.

== Spiritual and welfare organisation ==
In 1980, with the Venerable K. Sri Dhammananda's invitation, he traveled to Malaysia to be a resident monk at the Buddhist Maha Vihara in Kuala Lumpur. He was subsequently appointed the principal of its Sunday Dhamma School in 1988, and served as principal for a year, before vacating the post for a visit to the United States. He resumed his position in 1994 and remained the principal until 2008, when he was promoted to the Spiritual Advisor of the school.

After his return from the United States in 1994, he set up Ti-Ratana Welfare Society, a nonprofit organization that provides care and shelter to women, children, the elderly and the disabled as well as medical assistance to underprivileged, rural communities. The society also runs six community centres across the Klang Valley that cater to promoting Malaysian Chinese culture to the community, with Chinese cultural classes teaching Chinese calligraphy and art.

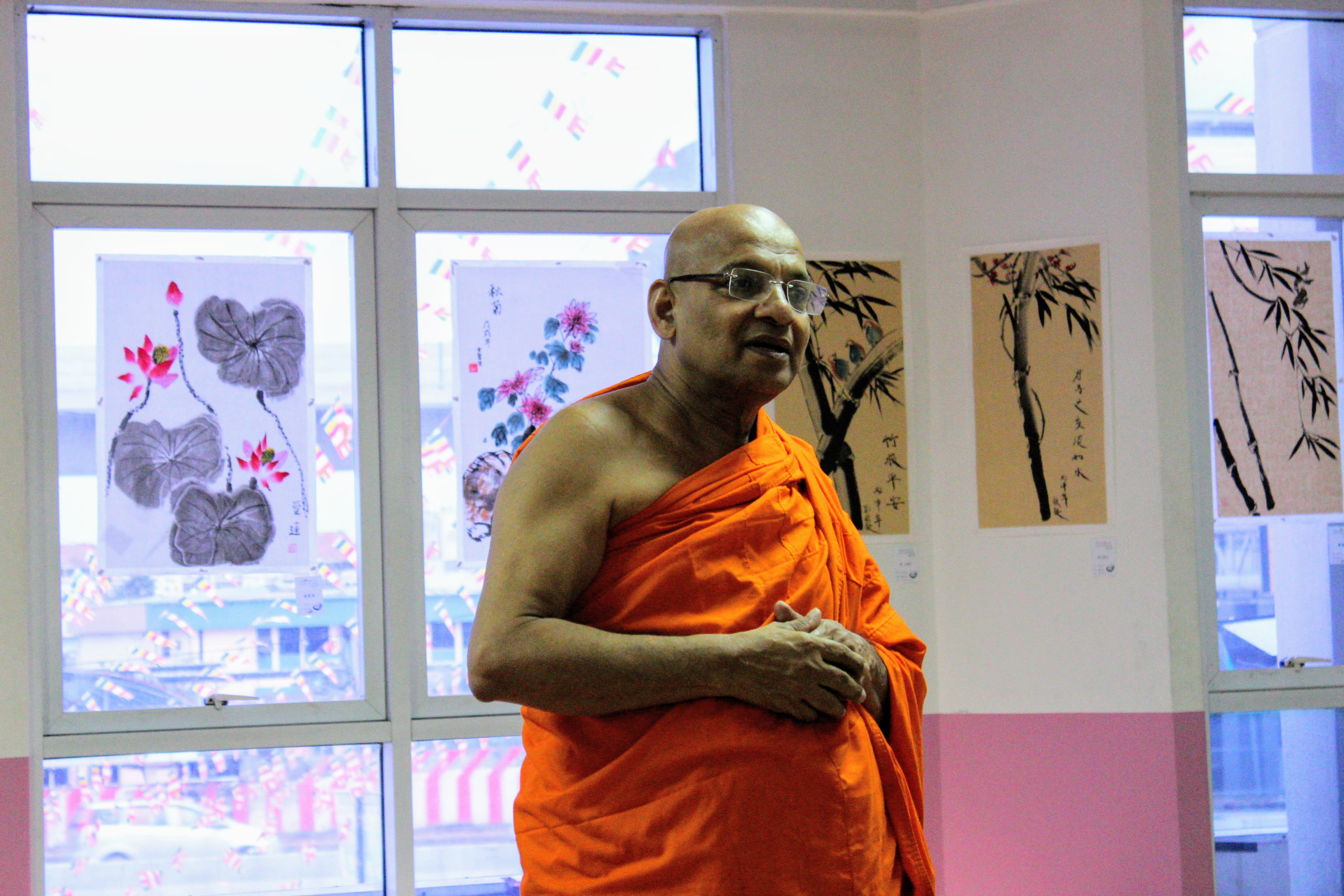
Dhammaratana at Ti-Ratana Lumbini Garden's Chinese Calligraphy and Art Exhibition (Wesak Eve 2018)

In 2000 the Ti-Ratana Welfare Society grew to become one of the largest non-profit organisations in Malaysia. Dhammmaratana set up a separate affiliated society, Ti-Ratana Buddhist Society, to promote Humanistic Buddhism. The Buddhist Society shares the same locations as the community centres and runs programmes in collaboration with Ti-Ratana Community Centres.

On 12 March 2007 he was appointed as Chief Sangha Nayaka of Malaysia by the Malwatta Chapter of the Siam Nikaya. The Yang di-Pertuan Agong of Malaysia conferred him with a Datuk title in November 2010.
