= List of Buddhist temples in Malaysia =

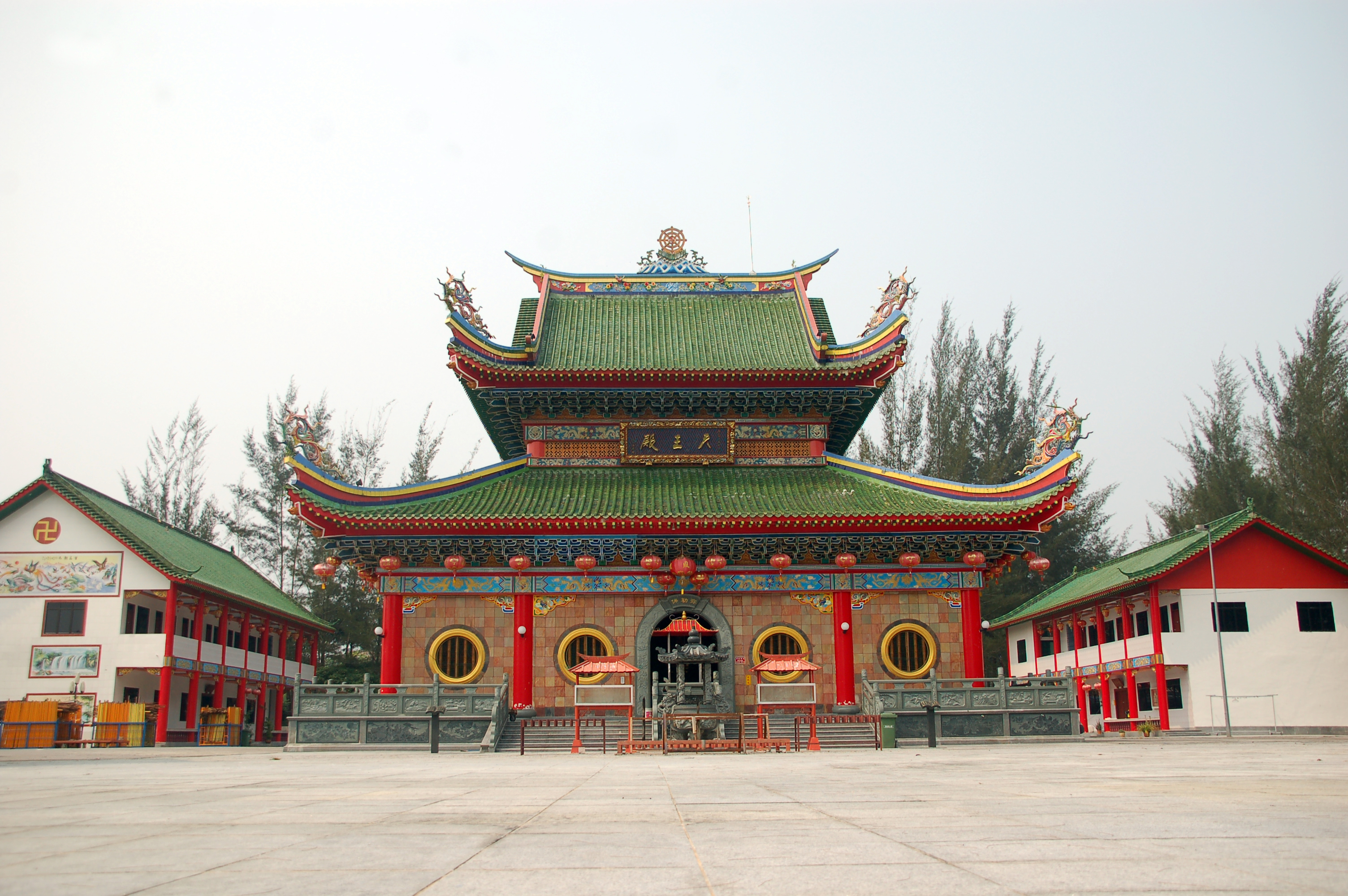
Jade Dragon Temple, Sibu, Sarawak

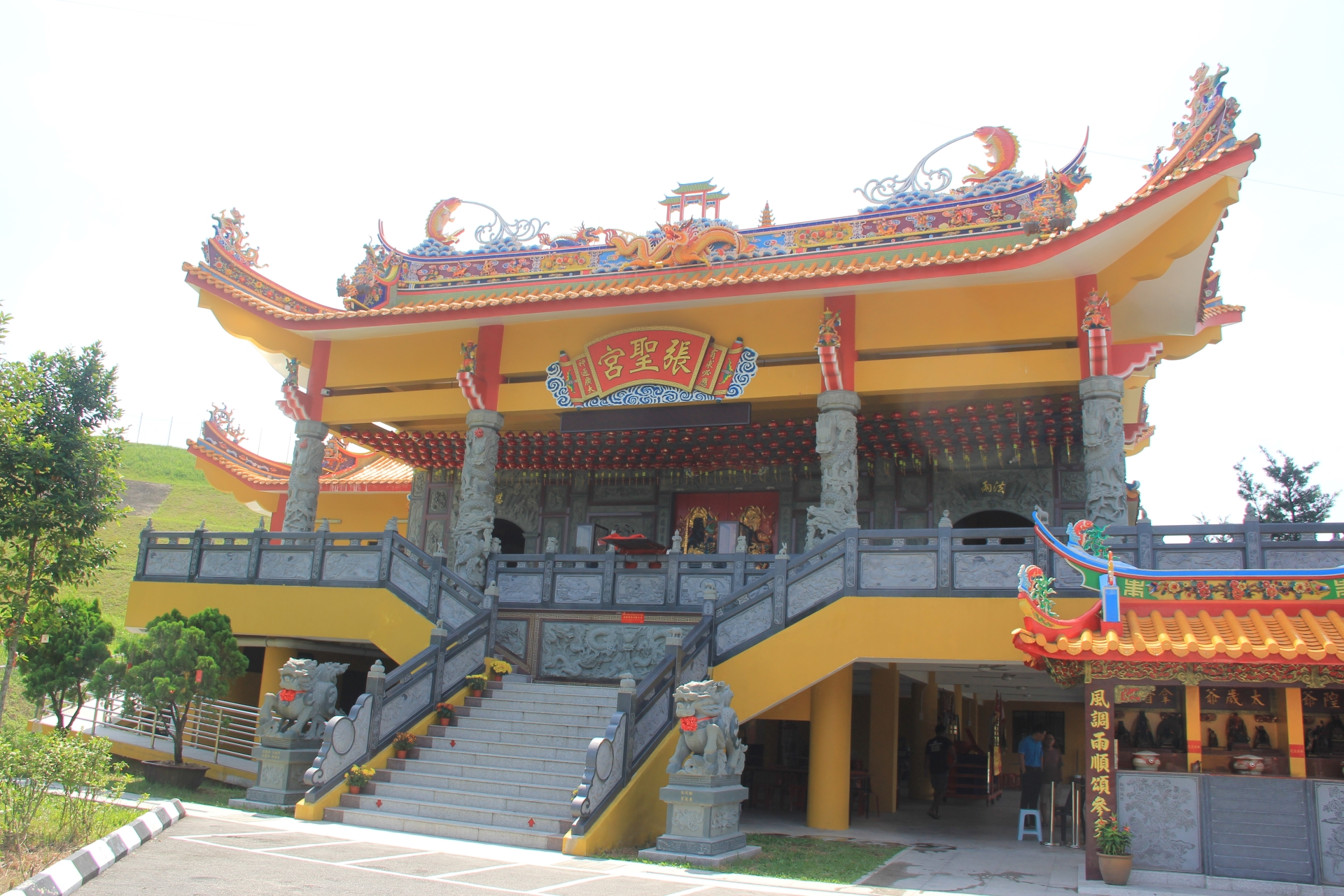
Tew Seng Keng Temple, Klang, Selangor

This is a list of Buddhist temples, monasteries, stupas, and pagodas in Malaysia for which there are Wikipedia articles, sorted by location.

== Johor ==
- Ching Giap See Temple

== Selangor ==
- Tew Seng Keng Temple, Klang
- Thai Buddhist Chetawan Temple

== Kelantan ==
- Wat Phothivihan

== Kuala Lumpur ==
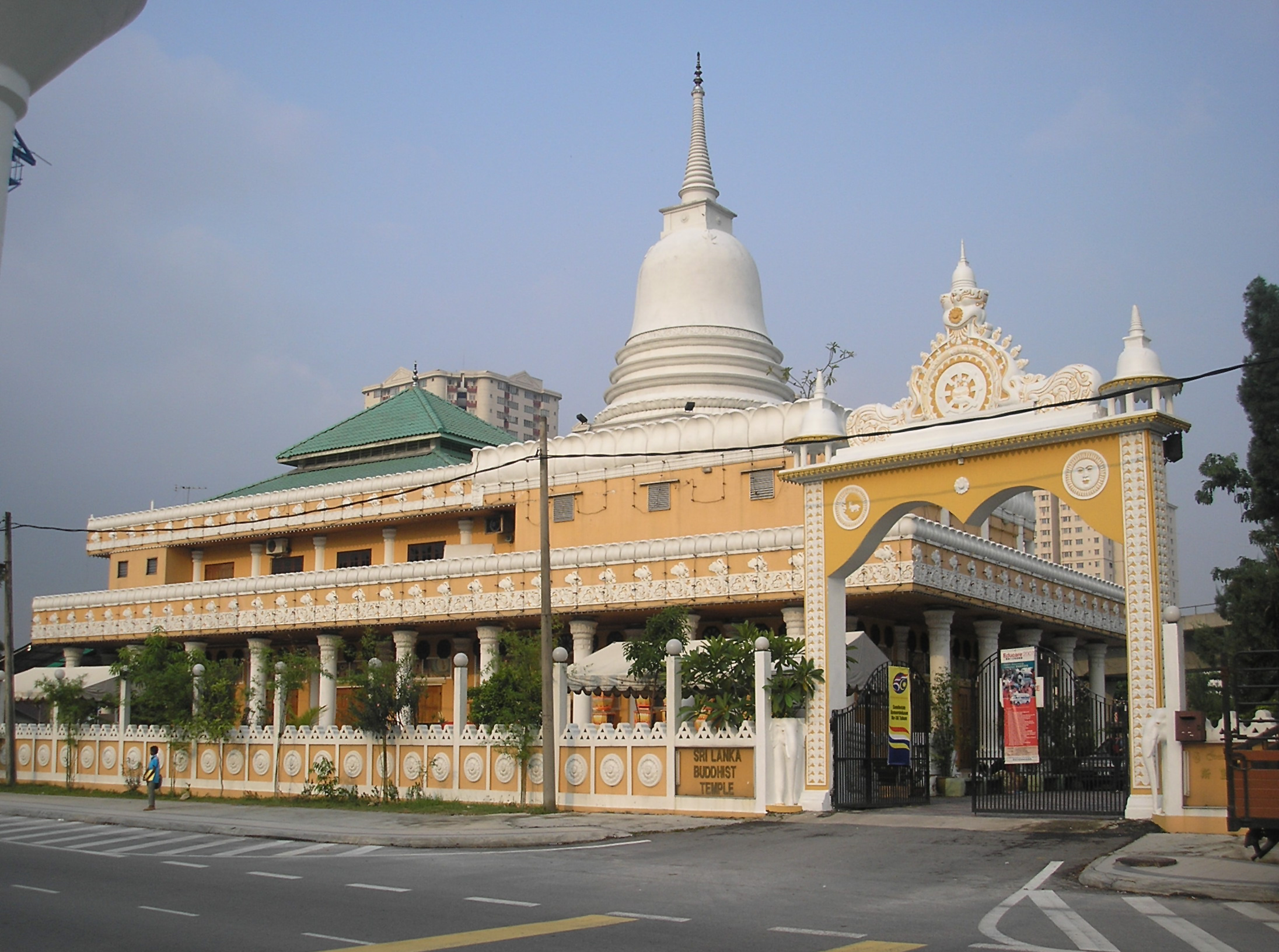
Sri Lanka Buddhist Temple (from Lorong Timur), Sentul, Kuala Lumpur

- Buddhist Maha Vihara, Brickfields
- Wat Meh Liew

== Malacca ==
- Cheng Hoon Teng Temple (oldest Buddhist temple in Malaysia)
- Xiang Lin Si Temple

== Pahang ==
- Chin Swee Caves Temple

== Penang ==
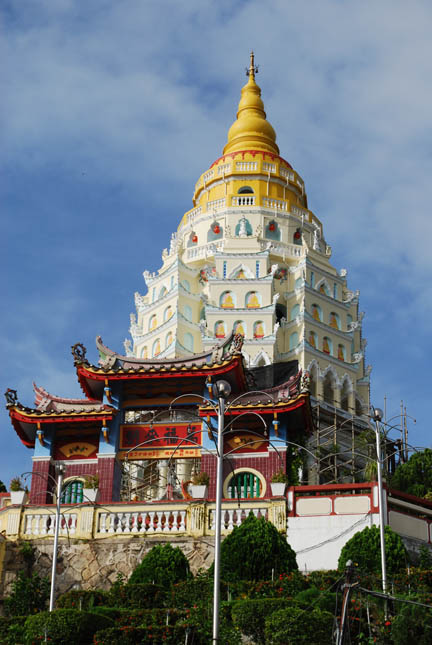
Kek Lok Si Temple, Penang

- Dhammikarama Burmese Temple
- Kek Lok Si Temple (槟城极乐寺)
- Mahindarama Buddhist Temple
- Nibbinda Forest Monastery (丛林道场)
- Wat Buppharam
- Wat Chaiyamangkalaram

== Perak ==
- Kek Look Seah Temple
- Sam Poh Tong Temple
- Sukhavana Meditation Monastery
- Sasanarakkha Buddhist Sanctuary

== Sabah ==
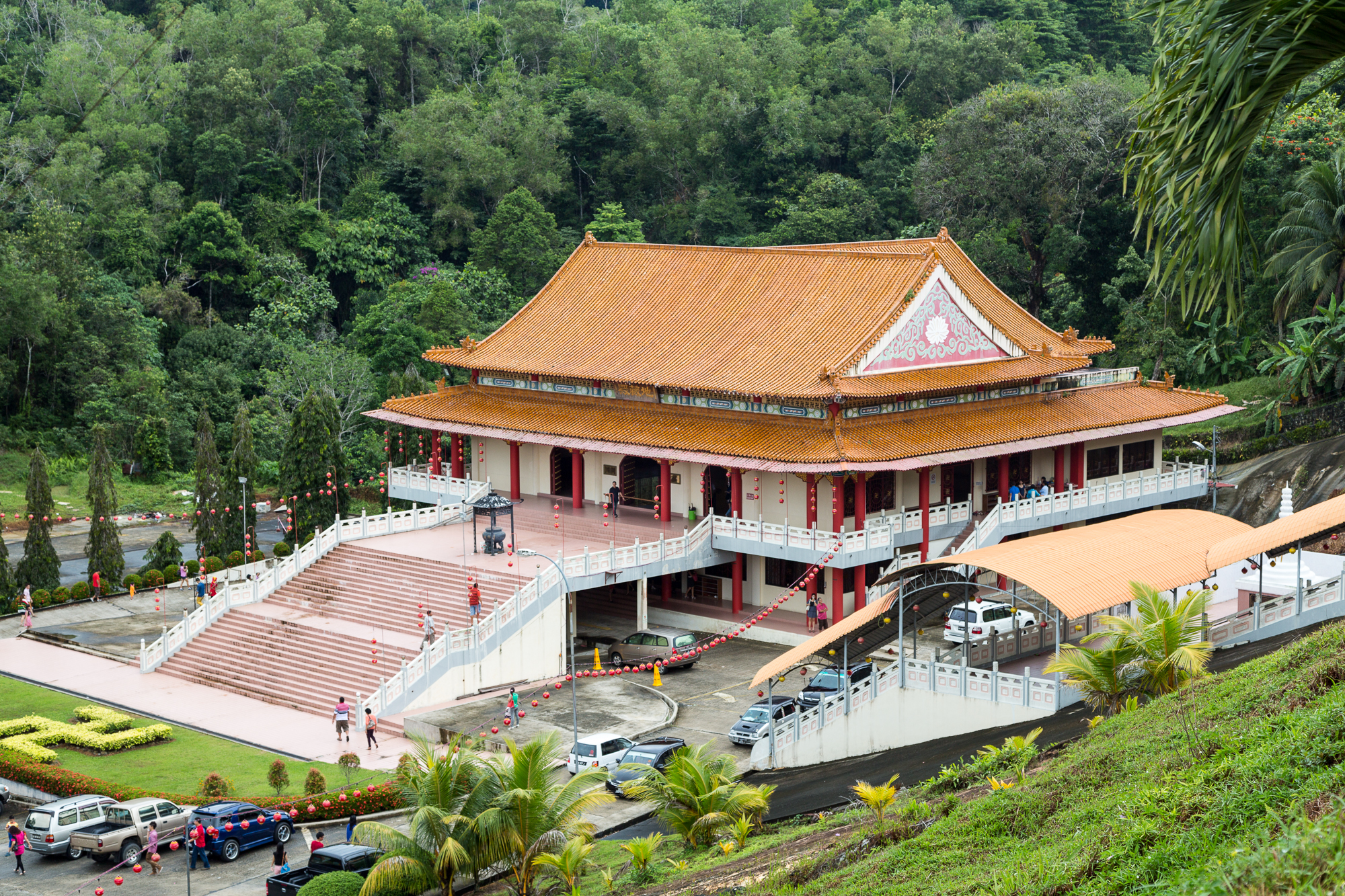
Puu Jih Shih Temple, Sandakan, Sabah.

- Fo Guang Shan Temple, Tawau
- Peak Nam Toong Temple
- Pu Tuo Si Temple
- Puu Jih Shih Temple

== Sarawak ==
- Ching San Yen Temple
- Jade Dragon Temple

== Archaeological sites ==
- Bujang Valley

== See also ==
- Buddhism in Malaysia
- List of Buddhist temples
- Malaysian Buddhist Institute
- Mahanavika Buddhagupta
