= Ching Giap See Temple =

Buddhist temple in Malaysia

Coordinates: 2°02′23.9″N 102°34′09.6″E

Ching Giap See Temple (Chinese: 麻坡净业寺) is located along Jalan Sulaiman in Muar and it is the largest Buddhist temple in the State of Johor, Malaysia. This Buddhist temple is considered as the Buddhist landmark in southern Malaysia region, as compared to Penang's Kek Lok Si Temple in Northern Malaysia region. It was first built on 23 June 1946, rebuilt in 1969 and expanded in 1982. It covers an area of about one acre.

== See also ==
- Buddhism in Malaysia
- Kek Lok Si Temple, Penang
- Xiang Lin Si Temple, Malacca
- Pu Tuo Si Temple, Kota Kinabalu, Sabah
- Puu Jih Shih Temple, Sandakan, Sabah
