= Chi Tu =

Ancient kingdom in north Malaysia

Chi Tu Raktamaritika
- 2nd century BC–7th century
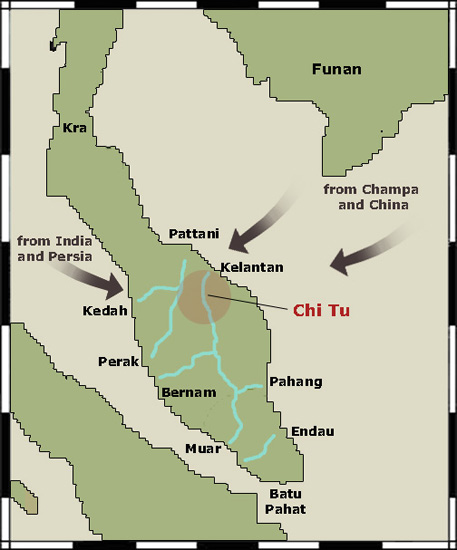
- Location of Chi Tu as indicated in the map of Transpeninsula route-ways.
- Capital: Sing-ha/ Singgora/ Songkhla
- Common languages: Old Malay, Kelantan Malay
- Religion: Buddhism
- Government: Monarchy
- King
  - fl. 607: Li-fu-duo-se
- History
  - Coronation of the first king: 2nd century BC
  - Conquered by Srivijaya: 7th century
Succeeded by
| Srivijaya |
| Tambralinga |
| Pan Pan (kingdom) |
- Today part of: Malaysia; Thailand

Chi Tu (also spelled Chihtu, Chitu or Ch-ih-t'u; Sanskrit: Raktamaritika or Raktamrittika; Chinese: 赤土國; pinyin: Chì-tǔ-guó; lit. 'Red Earth Country'; Malay language: Tanah Merah) was an ancient kingdom mentioned in the history of China. The Sui dynasty annals describe an advanced kingdom called Chi Tu in 607, when Chang Chun was sent as an ambassador there. The location of Chi Tu is disputed; proposals for its location include areas in the states of Kelantan or Pahang in Malaysia, or in Songkhla and Pattani Province of southern Thailand. The best evidence to support the Kelantan theory is that, when the envoys left Chi Tu, they took 10 days to sail to Champa, this indicates the kingdom was located somewhere 'red earth' around the main river of Kelantan. The inscribed Buddhagupta Stone found in Kedah mentioned a Raktamrttika, meaning "red earth land".

== History ==
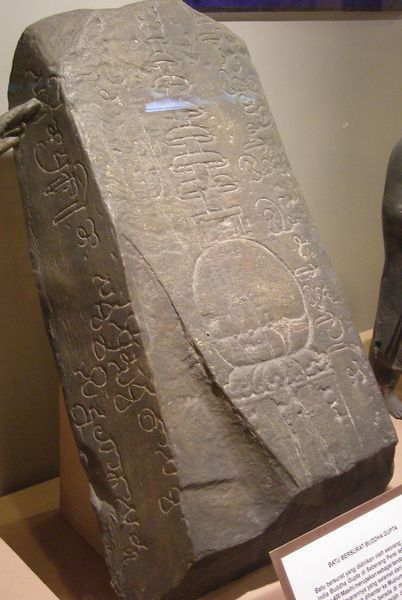
Replica of Buddhagupta stone on display at the National History Museum, Kuala Lumpur.

The Chi Tu kingdom is believed to have existed from as early as 100 BC to the 6th century AD. The royal family's name was Chu-dan (which means Gautama Buddha) and the king was Li-fo-duo-se. The Book of Sui gives the ruler's name as Li-fu-duo-se (利富多塞) of the Gautama line (瞿曇氏), and reports that his father had abdicated to enter the monkhood and passed the throne to him, that he had reigned sixteen years by the time of the Chinese embassy, and that his three queens were all daughters of neighbouring kings. According to Chinese records, Chi Tu was built by kit mow (Mon-Khmer) peoples who sailed from the coast of Funan (southern Indochina) that eventually intermarried with the local population. "... Chi Tu is a derivation nation of Funan, located in within the southern sea, sailing hundred days to reach, the majority terrain was red, thus named Red Earth Kingdom (Chi means red, Tu means earth). East bordering Bo Lo Ci, West bordering Po-Lo-Po, South bordering Ho Lo Tan, thousands of square miles in land area. The king has three wives and the kingdom embraced Buddhism ...".

Chi Tu along with Langkasuka, Kedah and others were early important trade centers (approximately 100 BC to 700 AD). During this period, ships coming from China, Funan and the Indian Ocean would stop at the coast of Malay Peninsula. They would get local porters to transport their goods, using rafts, elephants and manpower along the early transpeninsular routeway and part of the ancient spice route. By the 800 AD, the Chi Tu kingdom went into decline.

== Court and governance ==
In the 6th century, Chi Tu had already established diplomatic relations with China. During the Sui dynasty, the Chi Tu court was honoured with a Chinese embassy bearing "over 5,000 gifts". Chinese records describe a relatively sophisticated system of governance and court ritual; a senior court official was dispatched with a fleet and presents to receive incoming envoys, and succession among rulers was noted as orderly and peaceful.

The kingdom engaged in trade, particularly in gold and camphor, and maintained a fleet of around 30 ocean-going vessels. A Chinese embassy in 607 remarked on the wealth and refinement of the court. Administrative structures included officials responsible for criminal law, while local settlements were overseen by district chiefs. The king also maintained a treasury used to reward nobles within a vassalage system. Although regional nobles exercised a degree of autonomy, Sui envoys observed that they remained subject to some rulings of the central court.

The royal seat is named Sengzhi (僧祇). (Note: likely sanghika related to sangha) Its gate was in three tiers set about a hundred paces apart, each leaf painted with devas, ascetics and bodhisattvas and hung with feather work and flowers of gold; attendants stood at either side, those before the gate bearing arms and those within holding horsetail whisks. The palace consisted of several halls ranged one behind another and facing north, the king seated on a three-tiered throne in cloth of a colour likened to cloud at sunrise, wearing a gold crown and a chain of jewels, with a guard of more than a hundred and several hundred brahmans seated in facing rows to east and west.

The Book of Sui names the offices of state shared by three administration levels: one sardhakara, (Note: written as 薩陀迦羅, in modern Mandarin pinyin: satuojialuo) two dhanada (Note: as 陀拏達乂, in pinyin: tuonadayi) and three karmika; (Note: as 迦利密迦, in pinyin: jialimijia) a single kulapati (Note: as 俱羅末帝, in modern pinyin: Juluomodi) was in charge of law and judgment; and every town had one nayaka (Note: 那邪迦, in pinyin: nayejia) and ten patih. (Note: written as 鉢帝, in pinyin: bodi)

== The embassy of 607 ==
In 607 Emperor Yang of Sui, seeking contact with the lands overseas, sent Chang Jun (常驿) of the agricultural-lands office and Wang Junzheng (王君政) of the forestry office as envoys to Chi Tu, granting them a hundred bolts of cloth each and five thousand bolts to present to its king. The party sailed from Nanhai (南海郡) in the tenth month, passed Jiaoshi Island (焦石山) after twenty days and nights, and continued south to Lion Rock (獅子石), beyond which lay a chain of islands; two or three days further on they sighted the mountains of Langyaxu (狼牙須, Langkasuka) to the west and reached Jilong Island (雞籠島) on the frontier of Chi Tu.

The King sent a brahman named Kumara (鳩摩羅) with thirty ships, conch and drums to meet them, and a chain of gold to tow Chang Jun's vessel; at the capital the party was received by the King's son, Nayejia (那邪迷), escorted by a hundred men and women sounding conches and led in by two brahmans. The imperial letter was read before the assembled officials, after which music in the Indian manner was played. Chang Jun objected to the simplicity of the food first sent to the guest house, saying that he came from a great country and expected to be received accordingly; a banquet followed some days later at which more than a hundred dishes were set out on leaf platters, with cakes of four colours, and the envoys were seated above their attendants.

The return gifts were a gold crown and camphor, together with a letter engraved on gold beaten into the shape of leaves and carried in a censer of scented wood, seen off with conch and drum. The party sailed for more than ten days to a point north-east of Linyi and then along the coast north to Jiaozhi. In 610 Chang Jun presented the prince at court, and the Emperor rewarded the envoys with two hundred bolts of cloth, the prince and his companions receiving gifts according to rank.

== Society and customs ==
The Book of Sui describes the people as piercing their ears and cutting their hair short, using no kneeling salutation, and anointing themselves with scented oil. They honoured Buddhism and held brahmanism in respect; women wore the hair in a knot at the nape, and both sexes favoured cloth of a colour likened to cloud at sunrise. Wealthy families displayed their means freely, but gold ornament could not be worn unless granted by the king.

Marriages were set for an auspicious day. Five days beforehand the bride's family held a feast, at which her father led her by the hand and gave her to the groom; the wedding followed seven days later, after which the couple took their share of the property and set up separately, only young children remaining with the father. At a death the family cried aloud and put on white, built a pyre of timber beside the water, laid the body on it with incense and banners, and sent the dead off with conch and drum before letting the ashes fall into the stream. The rite was the same for every rank, except that a king's ashes were placed in a golden jar and lodged in a temple.

The climate is described as warm in both seasons with heavy rain and thin cloud, allowing cultivation all year, chiefly of rice, millet, white beans and hemp, with crops much like those of Jiaozhi. Liquor was made from sugarcane, yellow-red in colour and mild, and was known as drunken sugar.

== Location ==
Scholars do not agree on the location of Chi Tu. While some consider it to have been in the area of Phatthalung / Songkhla area, or Kelantan. The ruins around the Songkhla lake such as Bang Kaeo in Phatthalung or Sathing Phra in Songkhla might be one of the cities of Chi Tu.

The Chinese accounts do not agree on the length of the voyage. The Book of Sui places Chi Tu more than a hundred days' sail from China, whereas the later notice reckons it at little more than ten days south from Yazhou (崖州) with a favourable wind, passing Jilong Island. The same later notice records an observation of the sun standing overhead at the winter solstice, with night equal in length to day.

=== Sources from Indian scholars ===
J.L. Meons (1937) believed that early Srivijaya was located in Kelantan and K.A. Nilakanta Sastri (1949) supported the idea. The Kelantan theory may not be far-fetched, since the Chinese Sui dynasty annals of the 7th century describe an advanced kingdom called Chi Tu or Raktamrittika (as in Kelantanese history) as being in Kelantan, which the name was later changed to "Sri Wijaya Mala". The founding of Sri Wijaya Mala was 667 BC with its capital called "Valai", and it was situated along the upper Kelantan river of Pergau, known for its rich gold mines. It was in 570 BC that the kingdom changed its name to Sri Wijaya.

=== Songkhla vicinity theory ===
The inscription of the Buddhagupta Stone found in Kedah mentioned a Raktamaritika, the meaning is red earth land, to be the home town of a seafarer named Buddhagupta.

Lawrence Palmer Briggs placed Chi Tu at Patani. He argued that the account of Chang Chun's voyage puts it in the peninsula rather than the Menam valley, with its capital on the east coast and approached from the north. On his reading it reached across the peninsula into Kedah. He took the Buddhagupta inscription to fix that location, since Raktamrittikā is the Sanskrit equivalent of the Chinese Ch'ih-t'u, "Red Earth"; Hendrik Kern had suggested as much in 1884 and Pelliot drew attention to it in 1904. Earlier writers had instead read Chi Tu as lying in the Menam valley, among them Abel-Rémusat, Aymonier, Léon de Rosny, and Hirth and Rockhill, who rendered it simply as Siam; Le May in 1938 thought it might be Srideb. The old name of Songkhla is Singgora (City of Lions), which coincides with the Chinese chronicles that state the capital of Chi Tu was Sing-Ha (means lion) and also the nearby Singhanakhon district.

This name may also be related to Tambralinga because there is "Tam" (means red) in this name as same as Raktamaritika and Tampapanni. And this state has appeared in 642, the same area of the central Malay peninsula after Chi Tu has already faded away from the history. The best evidence supporting this theory is the mention that when the envoys left Chi Tu, they took 10 days to sail to Champa, which indicates the kingdom was located at the 'red earth' areas such as Rattaphum because Rattaphum means red earth as well.

== See also ==
- Pan Pan
- Nakhon Si Thammarat kingdom (Ligor)
- Mahanavika Buddhagupta
- History of Kedah
- Sultanate of Kedah
