= Hē Luó Dàn Kingdom =

Ancient kingdom in Indonesia

- 5th – 7th centuries
- Religion: Buddhism
- Government: Kingdom
- Historical era: Post-classical era
- Today part of: Malaysia; Indonesia

Hē Luó Dàn Kingdom (Chinese: 诃罗旦国/呵罗单国) was an ancient kingdom mentioned in the Chinese leishu, Cefu Yuangui, compiled during the Song dynasty (960–1279 CE). It bordered on the south of Chi Tu.

Hē Luó Dàn first appeared in the Chinese text Taiping Yulan volume 787, says King Pí Shā Bá Mó (毗沙跋摩) of Hē Luó Dàn from Java (阁婆洲) sent envoys to pay tributes to China. According to the Book of Song, Biographies of Barbarians, from 430 to 452 CE (the seventh to twenty-ninth year of Yuanjia in the Liu Song Dynasty), the country sent envoys to pay tribute four times.

No further information about the Hē Luó Dàn Kingdom has been found. Some places it on Sumatra or Java in Indonesia.
