= Bō Luó Cì Kingdom =

Ancient kingdom in southern Thailand

- 7th century
- Government: Kingdom
- Historical era: Post-classical era
- Today part of: Thailand; Malaysia

Bō Luó Cì Kingdom (Chinese: 波罗刺国) was an ancient kingdom mentioned in the Chinese leishu, Cefu Yuangui, compiled during the Song dynasty (960–1279 CE). It bordered on the east of Chi Tu. However, no further information about the Bō Luó Cì Kingdom has been found, and its identification is currently uncertain.
