= Pó Luó Pó Kingdom =

Ancient kingdom in Southeast Asia

Pó Luó Pó Kingdom Bhāradvāja
- 7th century
- Religion: Buddhism
- Government: Kingdom
- Historical era: Post-classical era
- Today part of: Indonesia; Thailand; Malaysia

Pó Luó Pó Kingdom (Chinese: 婆罗婆国) or Bhāradvāja was an ancient kingdom mentioned in the Chinese leishu, Cefu Yuangui, compiled during the Song dynasty (960–1279 CE). and in the Taiping Yulan. It bordered on the west of Chi Tu. However, no further information about the Pó Luó Pó Kingdom has been found, and its identification is currently uncertain. Some place it on northern Sumatra in Indonesia.
