= Jade Dragon Temple =

Chinese temple in Sibu, Malaysia

- Malay: Tokong Naga Jade; Chinese: 玉龙山天恩寺
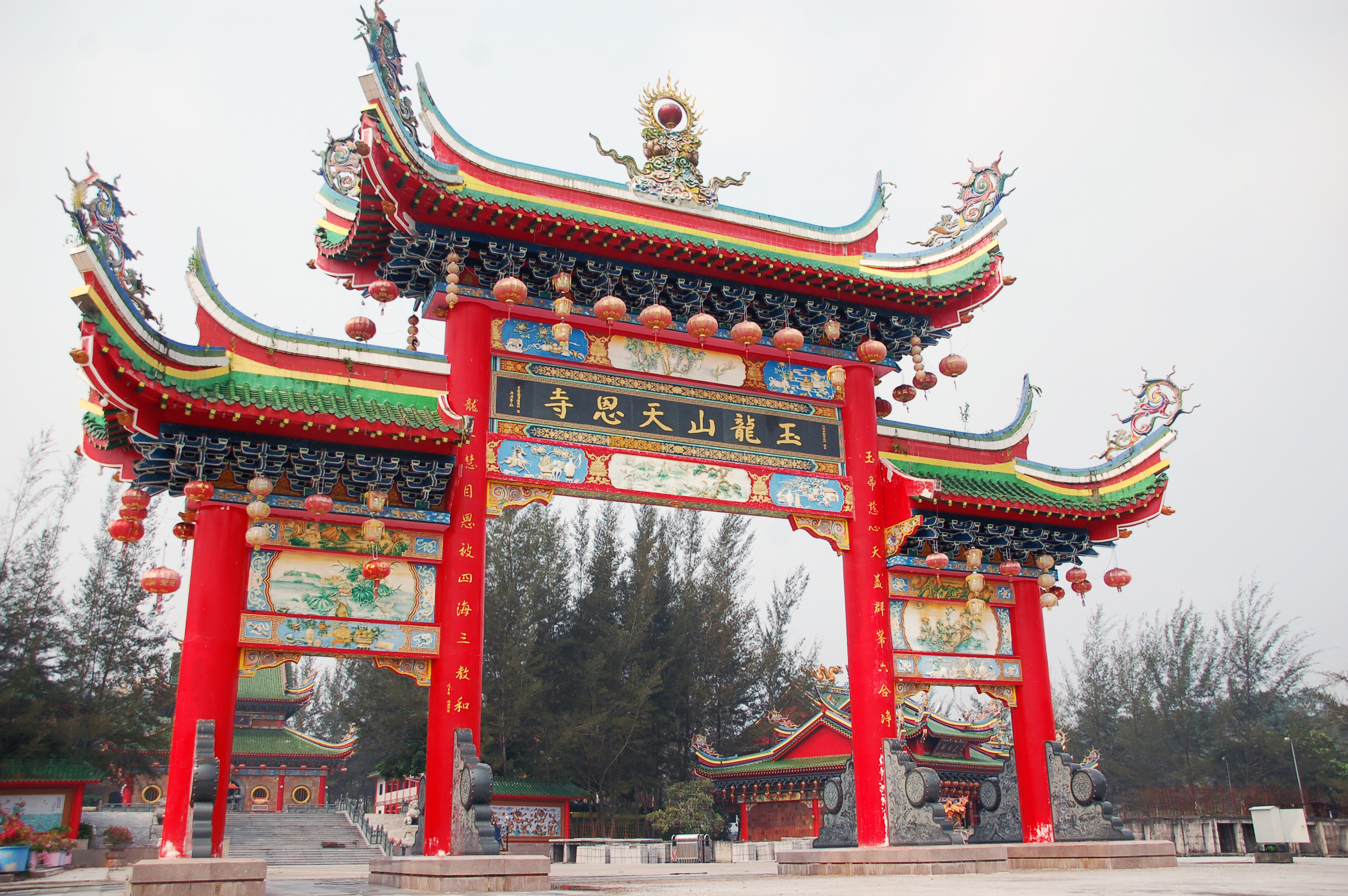

Religion
- Affiliation: the three teachings
- District: Sibu District

Location
- Location: Sibu
- State: Sarawak
- Country: Malaysia
- Interactive map of Jade Dragon Temple
- Coordinates: 2°17′19.639″N 112°1′5.535″E

Architecture
- Type: Chinese temple
- Established: 2004
- Completed: 2009
- Construction cost: RM60 million

The Jade Dragon Temple (Chinese: 玉龙山天恩寺), also known as Yu Lung San Tien En Si, is a Chinese temple located at KM26 of Sibu-Bintulu Road in Sibu, Sarawak, Malaysia. The temple housing the places of worship for Buddhism, Confucianism and Taoism, with the temple complex is considered as the largest not only in Malaysia but believed to be the largest in Southeast Asia as well.

== History ==
The temple complex was constructed in October 2004 through the idea of an 70-year-old Hii Siew Onn who is managing the temple committees in Bintulu and Miri. The temple materials were mostly imported from China and constructed jointly by Chinese nationals and native Ibans.

== Features ==
Each of the temple building has a large hall housing statues of Gautama Buddha, Smiling Buddha, Dashizi Bodhisattva and the four-faced Goddess among the many Chinese deities. Other section in the temple include a cultural and resource centre, two bell-and-drum towers, a theatre and a hall where the sutras are kept, Chinese zodiac garden, 7 Heavenly Sisters, as well as a lodging house and restaurant.

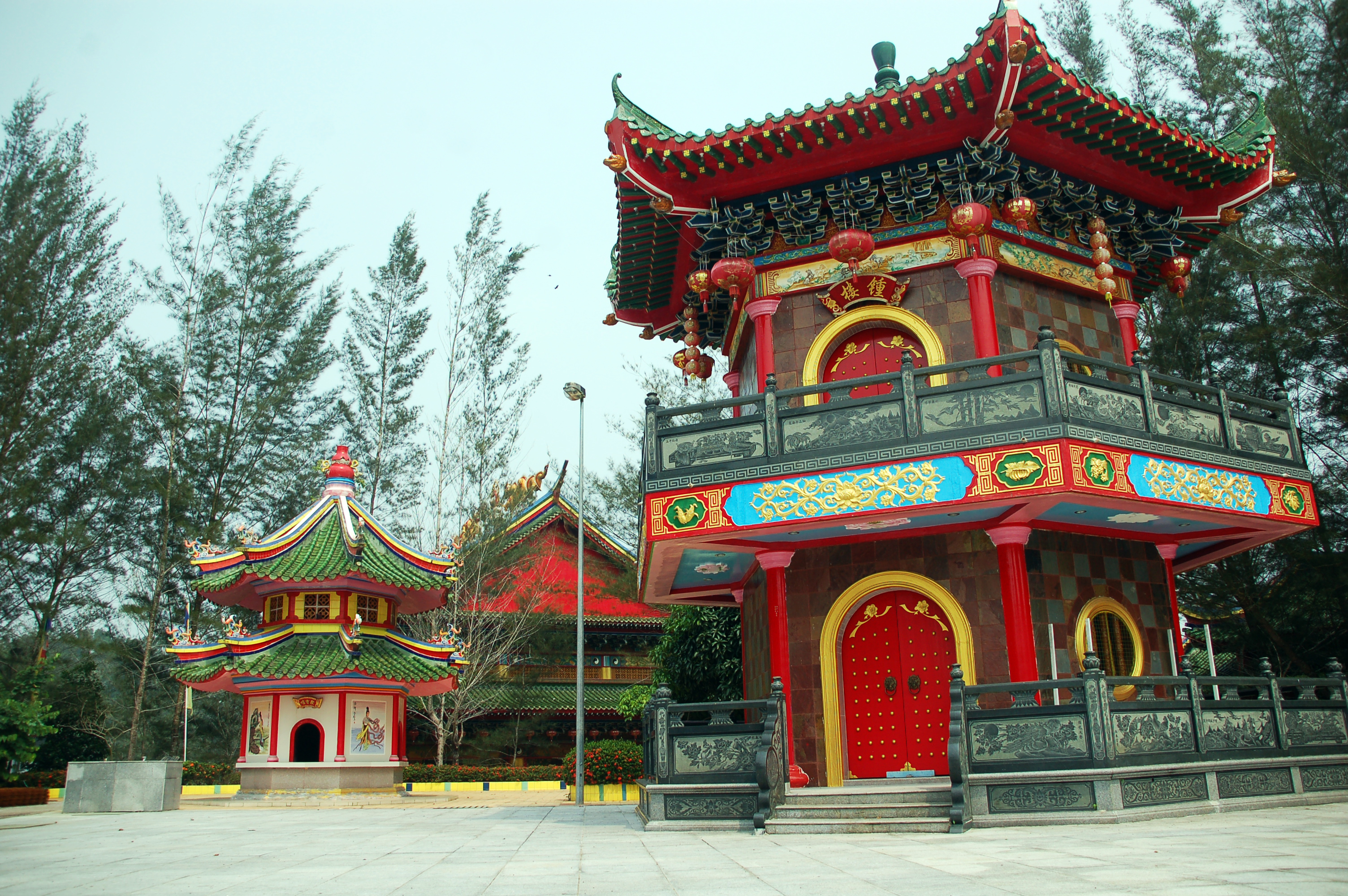
Bell tower.

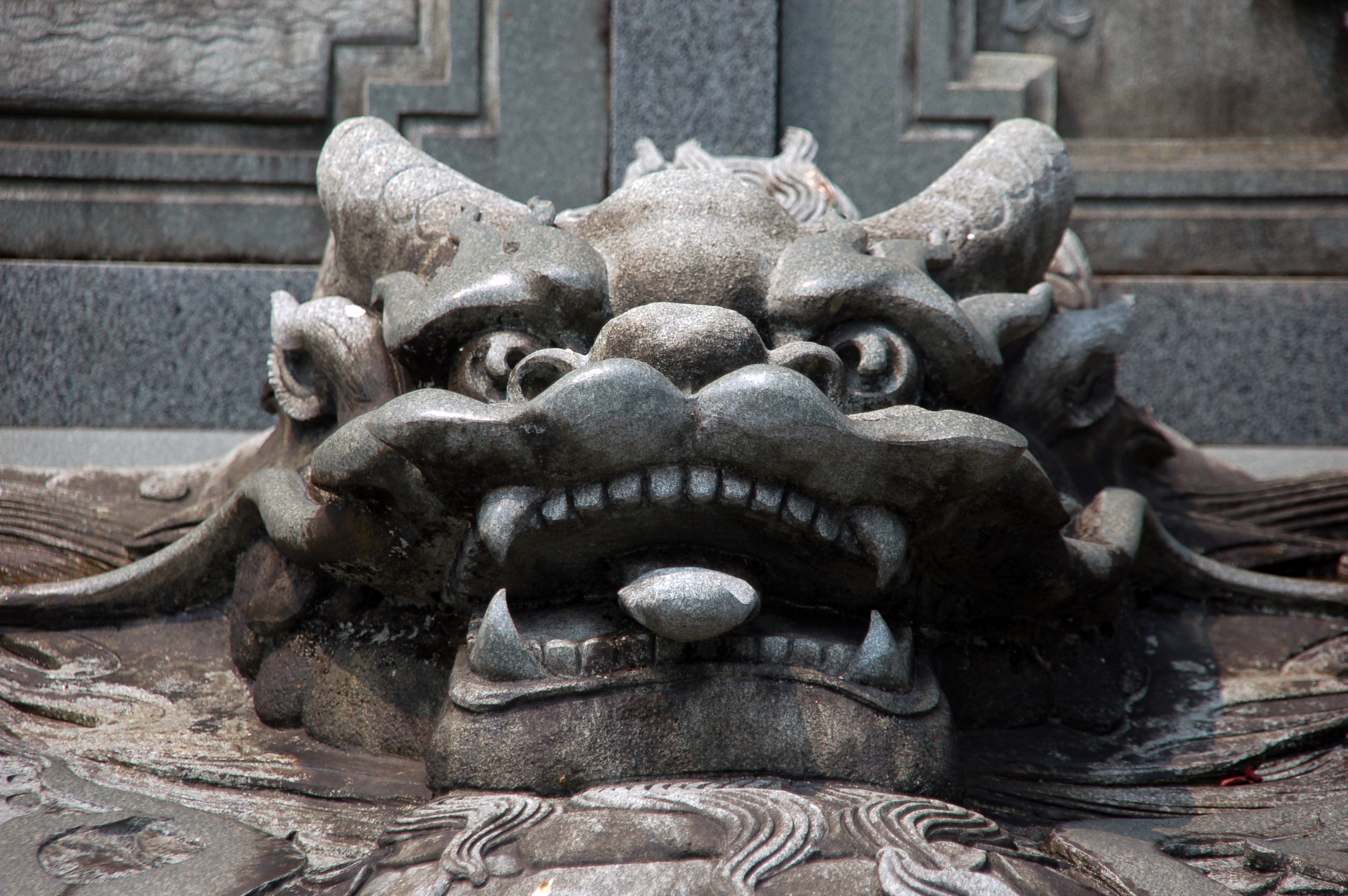
Chinese dragon stone.

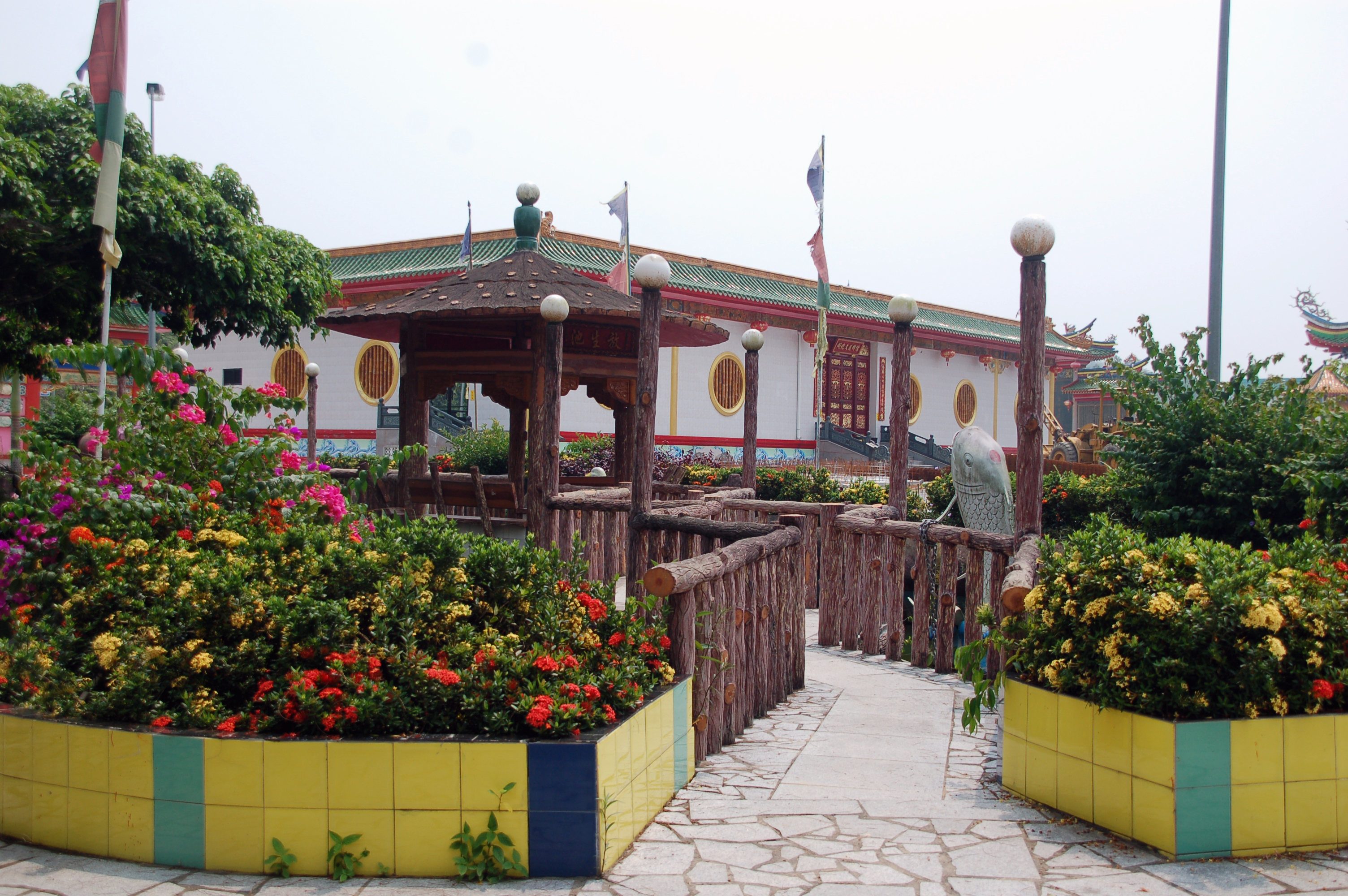
Chinese-style garden.

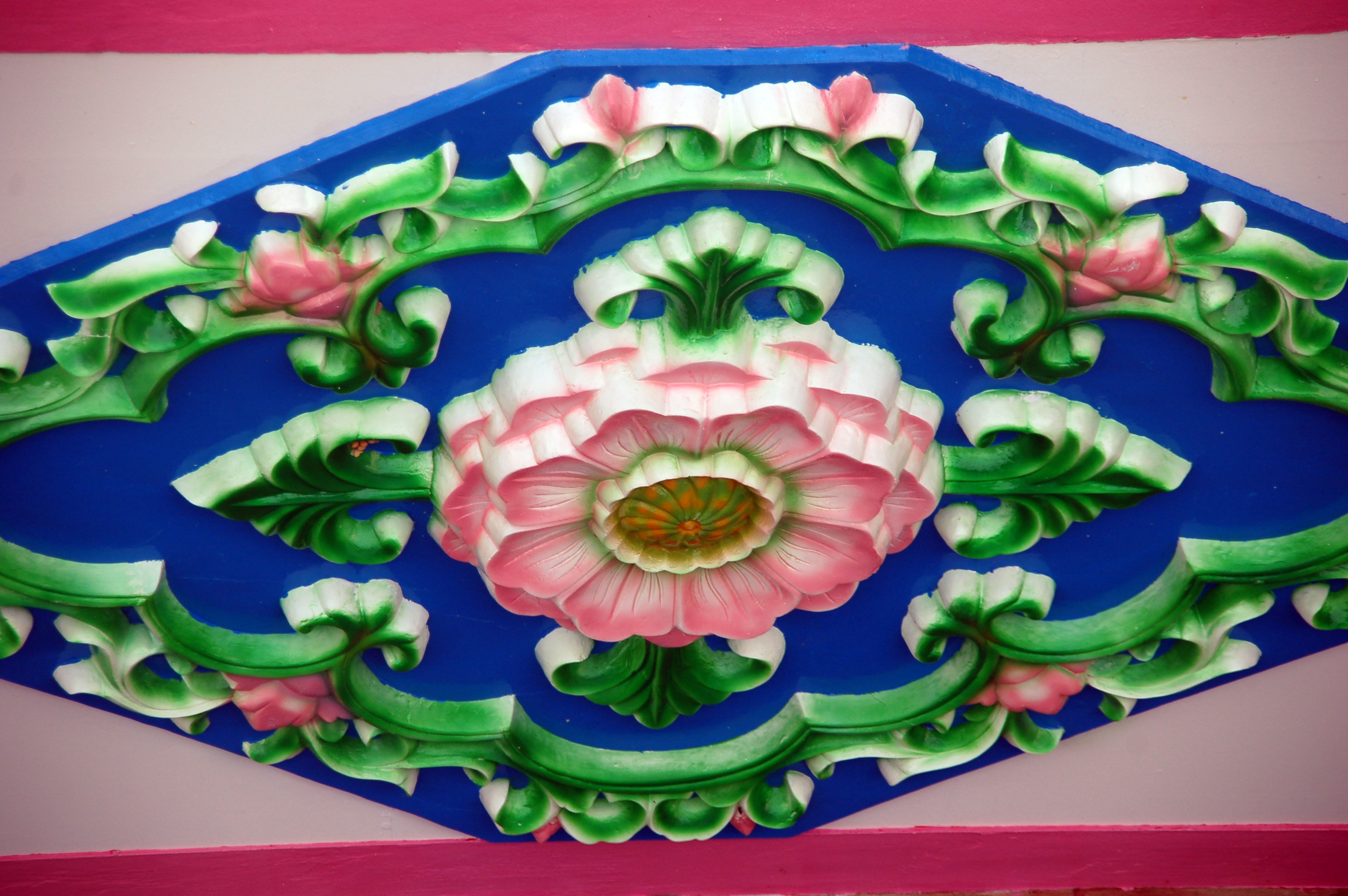
Lotus wall sculpture.

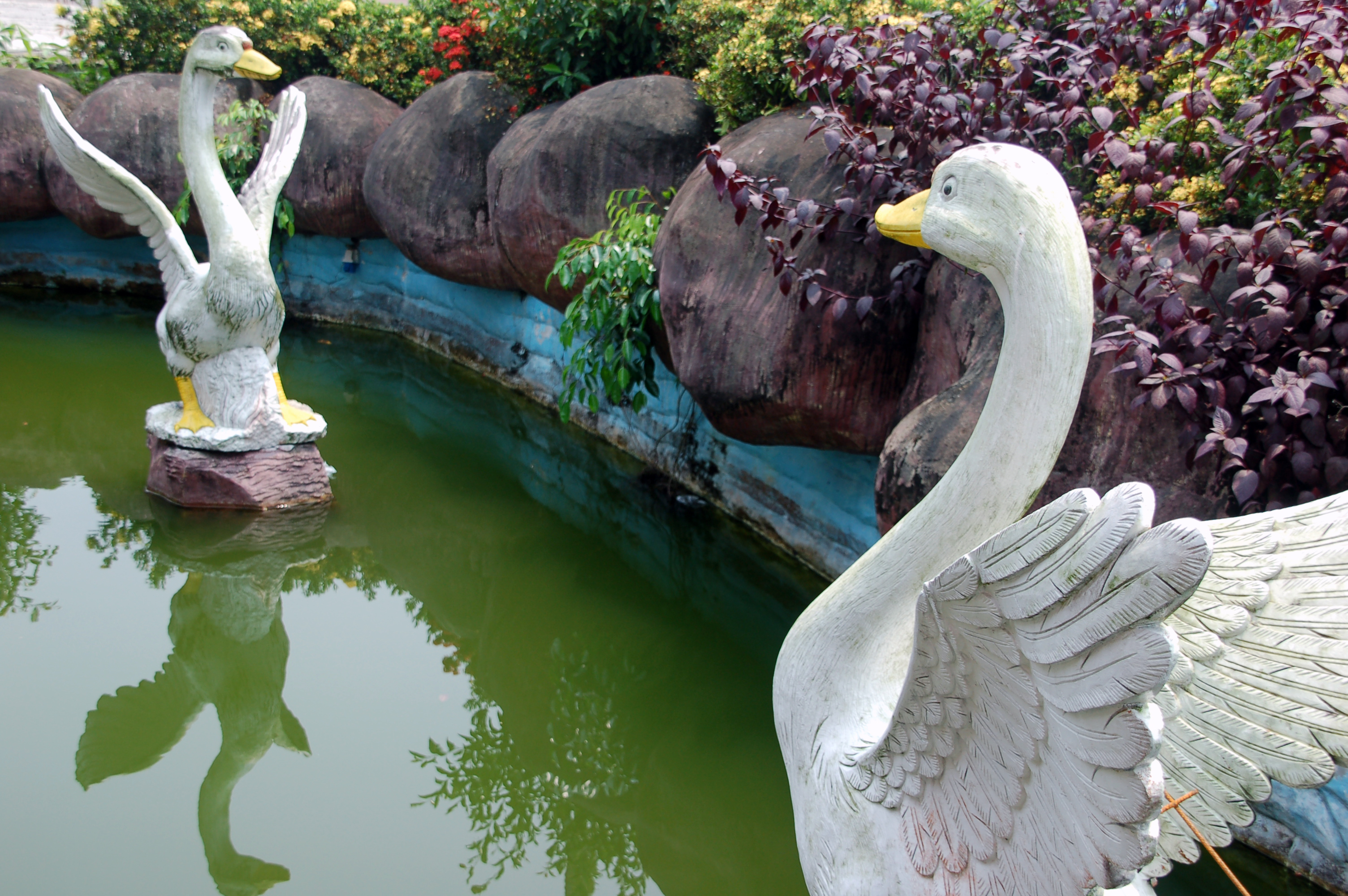
Swan sculpture.

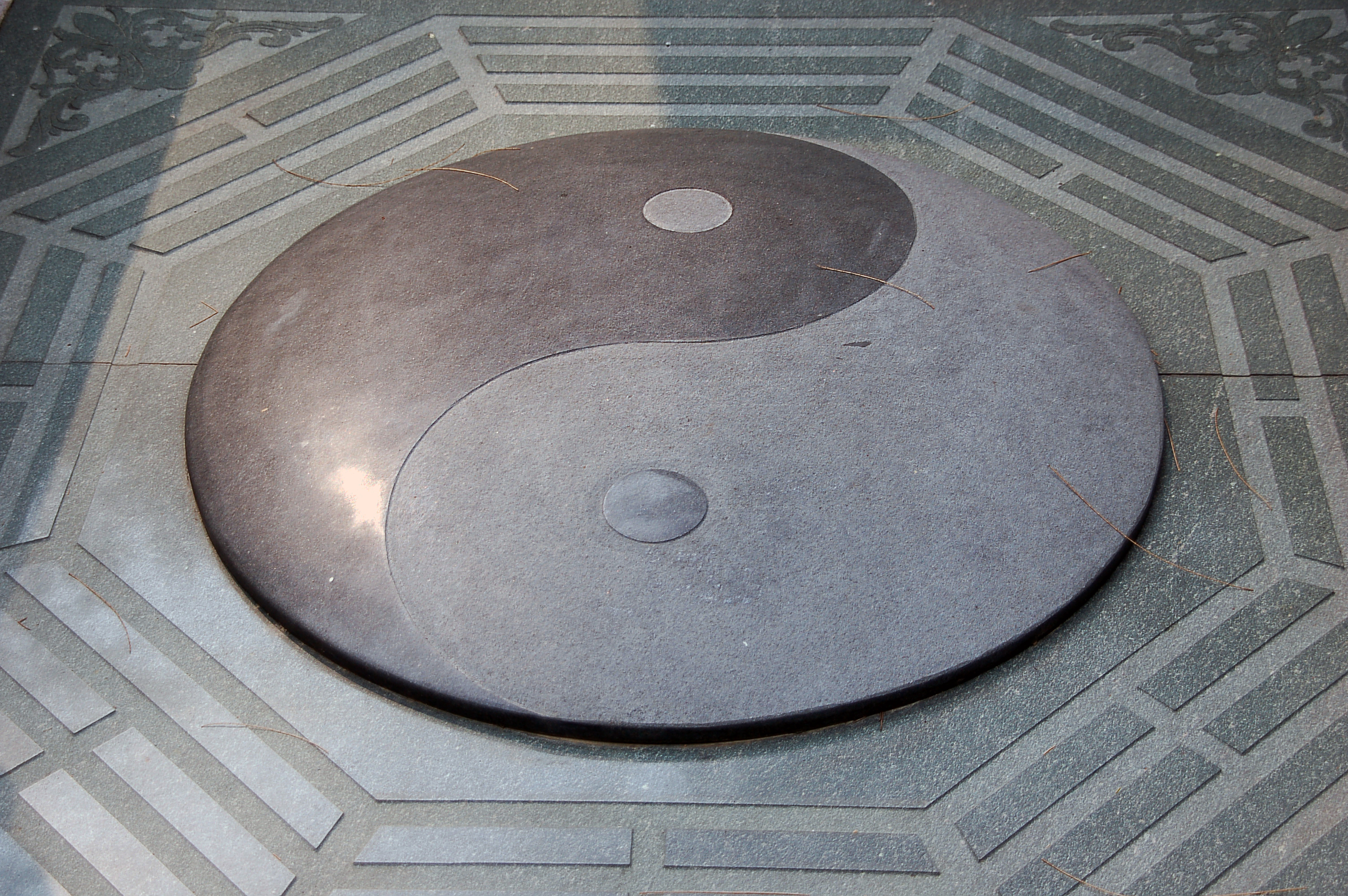
Yin yang symbol carved in stone.
