= Peak Nam Toong Temple =

Chinese temple in Kota Kinabalu, Sabah, Malaysia

- Malay: Tokong Puncak Nam Toong; Chinese: 碧南堂
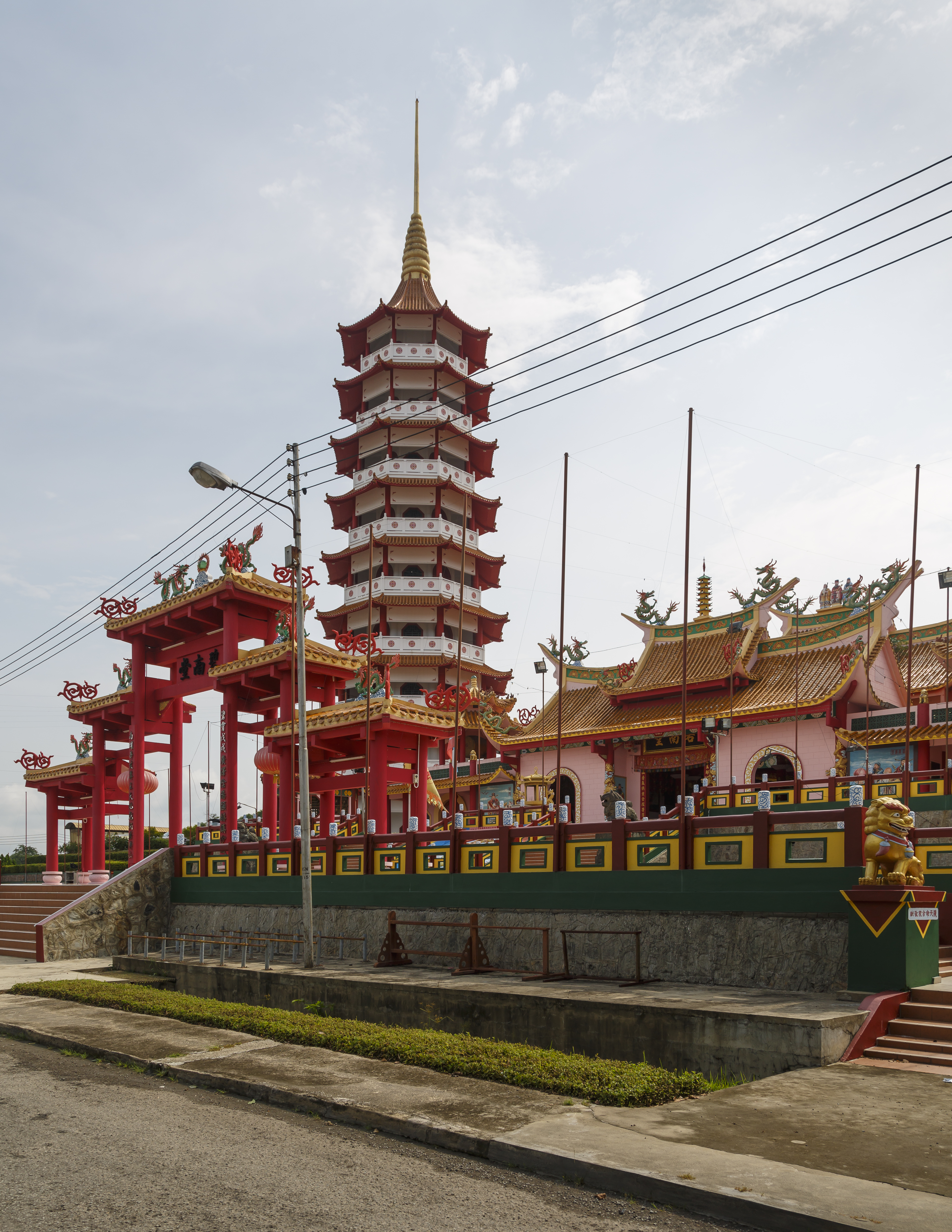

Religion
- Affiliation: Buddhism, Taoism
- District: Kota Kinabalu District

Location
- Location: Kota Kinabalu
- State: Sabah
- Country: Malaysia
- Interactive map of Peak Nam Toong Temple
- Coordinates: 5°57′1″N 116°4′33″E

Architecture
- Type: Chinese temple, pagoda
- Established: 1970
- Completed: 1982

Peak Nam Toong Temple (Chinese: 碧南堂) (also called as Peak Nam Tong Temple) is a Chinese temple located among housing estate beside Lorong Bunga Bakawali 3 in Kota Kinabalu, Sabah, Malaysia.

== History ==
The temple was established in 1970 before undergoing renovation in 1982 with the temple patron deity are delivered from Anxi of Fujian Province in China.

== Features ==
The temple wall inside are filled with colourful drawings along with the murals of Four Heavenly Kings. Beside the main prayer building, there is a 9-storey pagoda and an octagonal shaped Tian gong shrine for the worship of Jade Emperor in the temple compound.

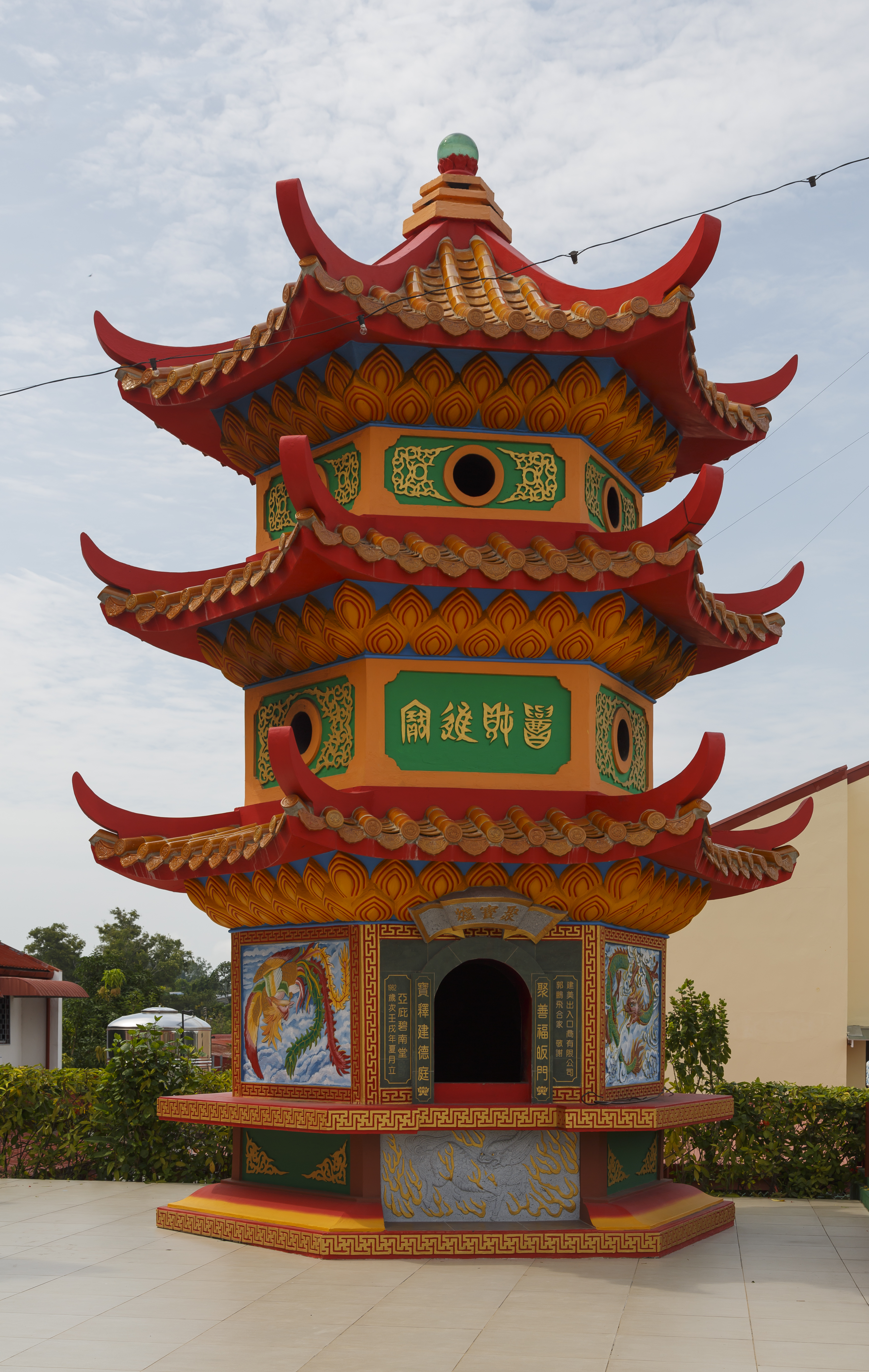
Incense burner in the temple compound.

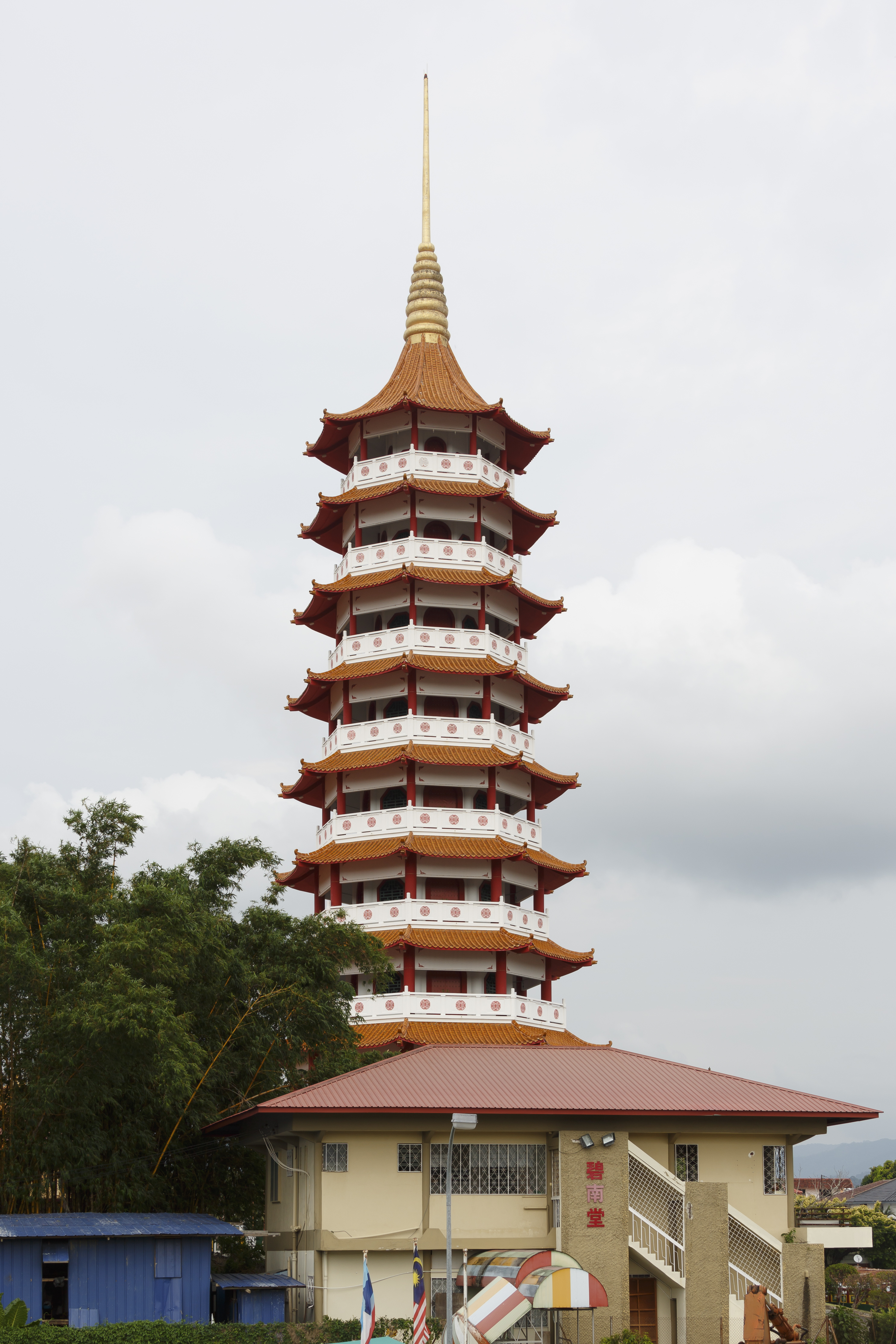
The 9-storey pagoda seen from far.

The temple also managing a kindergarten located far from the temple area.
