= Fo Guang Shan Temple, Tawau =

Buddhist temple in Tawau, Malaysia

Fo Guang Shan Temple Tawau
- 佛光山寺斗湖

Religion
- Affiliation: Buddhism
- District: Tawau District
- Governing body: Malaysian Buddhist Consultative Council

Location
- Location: Tawau
- State: Sabah
- Country: Malaysia
- Administration: Buddha's Light International Association
- Geographic coordinates: 4°14′58.951″N 117°53′31.322″E

Architecture
- Type: Chinese temple

Fo Guang Shan Temple Tawau (Chinese: 佛光山寺斗湖; pinyin: Fóguāngshān Sì Dǒuhú) is a Buddhist temple located in Tawau, Sabah, Malaysia. It is one of the overseas temple for the Fo Guang Shan Buddhist organization based in Taiwan.
