= Ching San Yen Temple =

Chinese temple in Kuching, Malaysia

- Malay: Tokong Ching San Yen; Chinese: 古晋青山巖
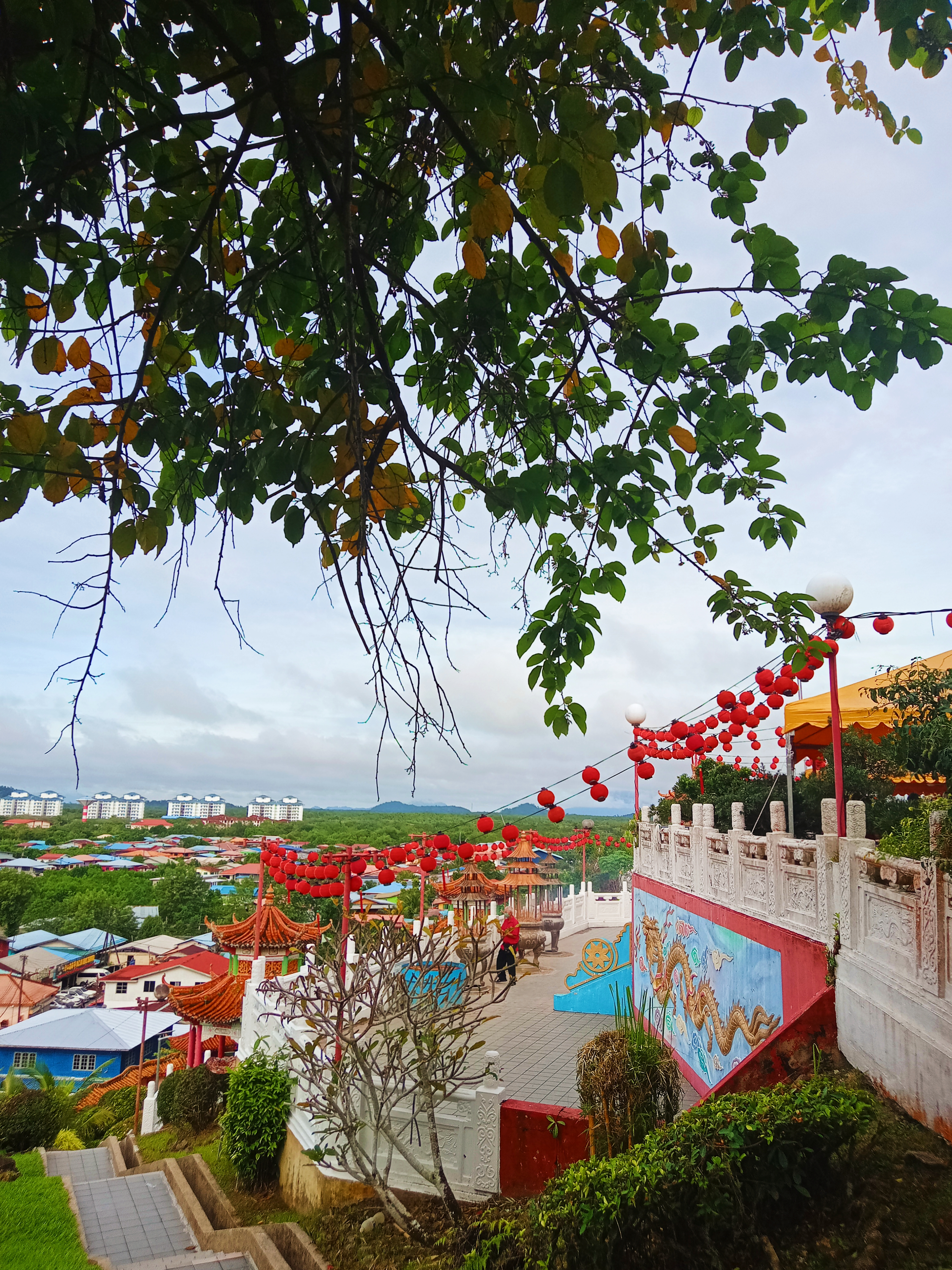

Religion
- Affiliation: Buddhism
- District: Kuching District

Location
- Location: Kuching
- State: Sarawak
- Country: Malaysia
- Interactive map of Ching San Yen Temple
- Coordinates: 1°38′46.298″N 110°29′6.042″E

Architecture
- Type: Chinese temple
- Established: unknown, 200 years ago

Ching San Yen Temple (also called as Chin San Yan Temple or Green Hill Temple) is a Buddhist temple located in a 2.5-acre site on a hill at 120 ft above sea level at the Sarawak River delta in Kuching, Sarawak, Malaysia.

== History ==
The temple had been existed on the hill since about 200 years ago, starting as a small temple. It was built by Chinese immigrants as a deep gratitude to Buddha Bodhisattvas and Mazu (Goddess of the Seas) for having guided, protected and blessed them on their dangerous journey where the location is selected based on geomancy selection following their safe arrival at the estuary of Sarawak River. The temple then become the source of fresh water to nearby village until 1980 when water supply being extended to the settlement. In 1903, the temple was renovated and enlarged.

== Gallery ==
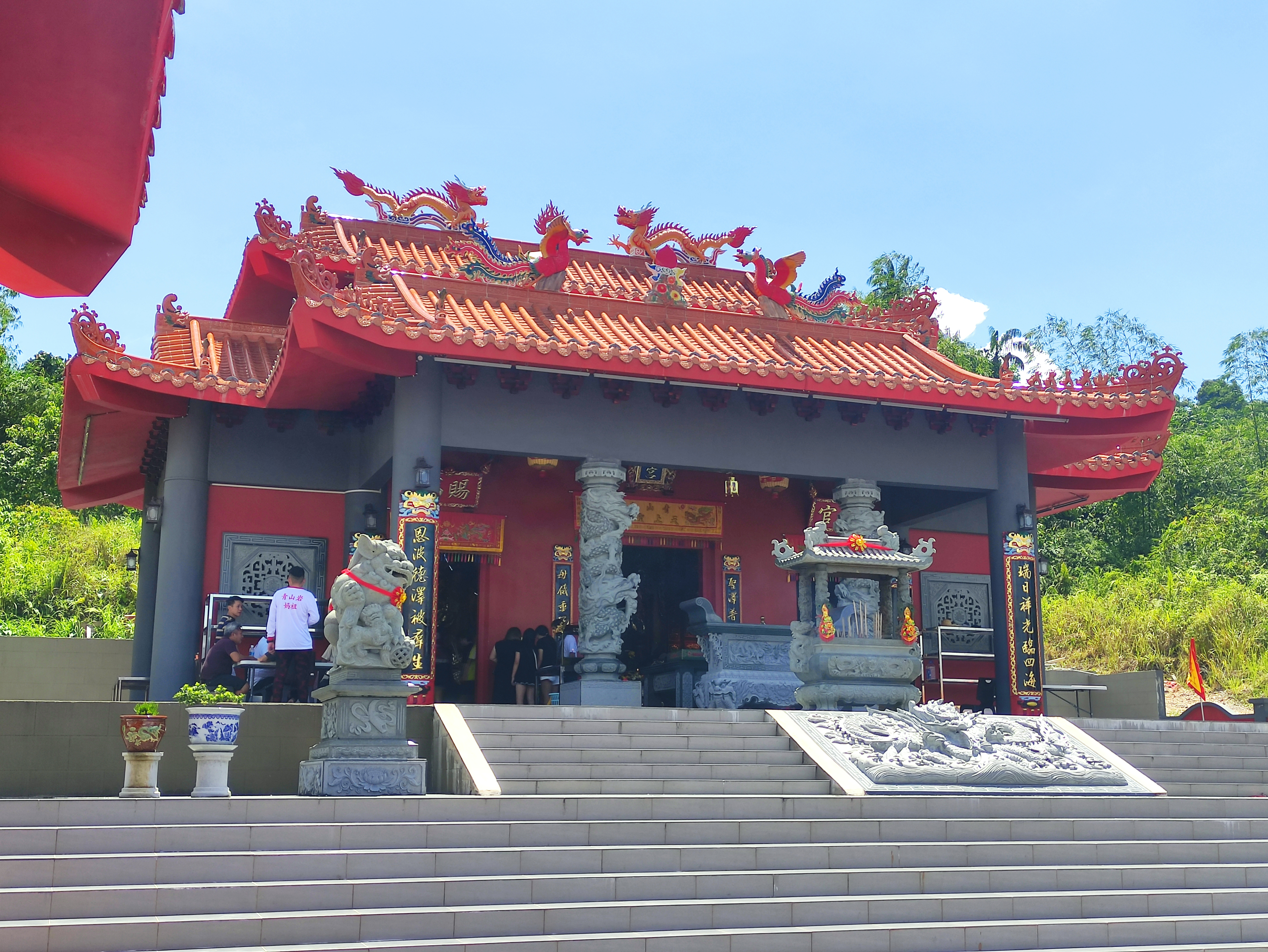
Mazu Temple (Tian Hou Gong) new extension

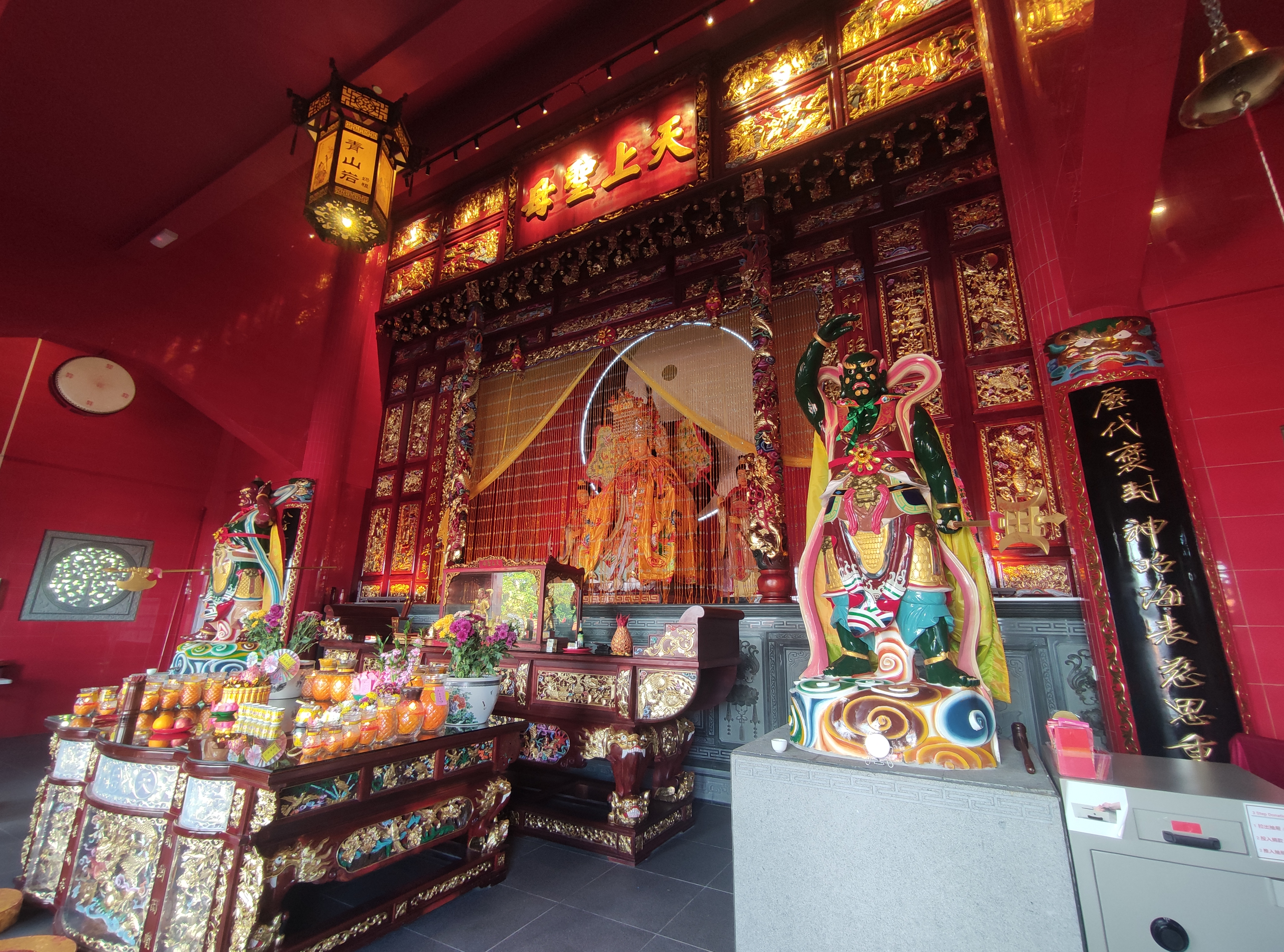
Interior design of Mazu Temple
