= Sasanarakkha Buddhist Sanctuary =

Buddhist monastery in Larut, Matang and Selama, Perak, Malaysia

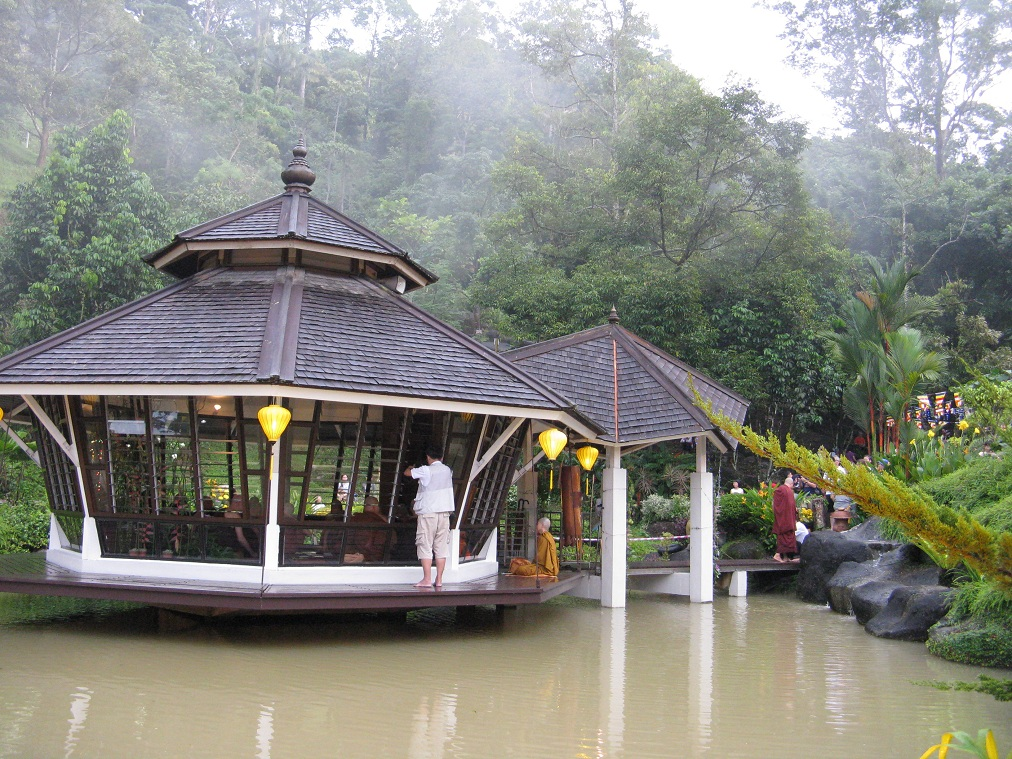
Sasanarakkha Buddhist Sanctuary

Sasanarakkha Buddhist Sanctuary (SBS) is a Buddhist monastery in Taiping, Perak, Malaysia. It was founded in January 2000 by Ven. Aggacitta as a training centre for Malaysian Theravada Buddhist monks. Its mission is to prepare postulants and new monks to live in accordance with the Dhamma-Vinaya — the core principles of Buddhism — as enshrined in the Pali Canon.

== See also ==
- Theravada
- List of Buddhist temples
