= Nibbinda Forest Monastery =

Theravada forest monastery in Balik Pulau, Penang, Malaysia

- Malay: Biara Hutan Nibbinda; Chinese: 丛林道场
- Location within George Town

Religion
- Affiliation: Buddhism
- Ecclesiastical or organisational status: Monastery
- Year consecrated: 2009
- Status: Active

Location
- Location: Balik Pulau
- Municipality: George Town
- State: Penang
- Country: Malaysia
- Coordinates: 5.356956°N 100.247562°E

Website
- http://nibbinda.org

Nibbinda Forest Monastery (simplified Chinese: 丛林道场; traditional Chinese: 叢林道場) is a Theravada Buddhist forest monastery within George Town in the Malaysian state of Penang. The monastery is located atop a hill at Balik Pulau, surrounded by mountains and facing the sea.

== History ==
In the early of 2009, Nibbinda Forest Monastery was officially offered to and named by the Most Venerable Pa Auk Tawya Sayadaw. Nibbinda means “disgust with worldly life”. By leaving the hustle and bustle of the worldly life, monks will be able to learn and practise the Buddha’s teachings in a comfortable environment.
