= Pu Tuo Si Temple =

Malaysian Buddhist temple

- Malay: Kuil Pu Tuo Si; Chinese: 亞庇佛教居士林普陀寺
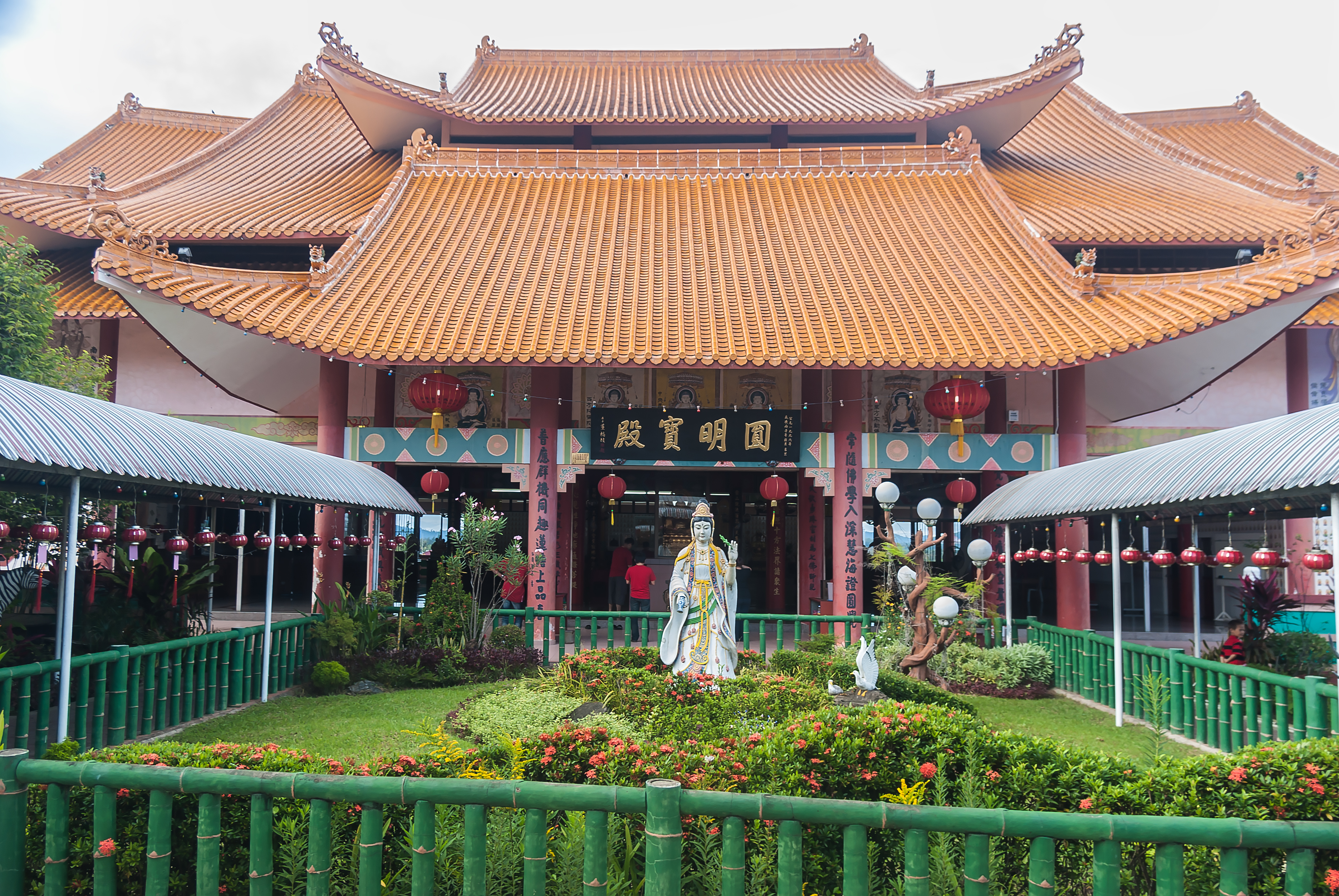
- Pu Tuo Si Temple

Religion
- Affiliation: Buddhism
- District: Kota Kinabalu District

Location
- Location: Kota Kinabalu
- State: Sabah
- Country: Malaysia
- Interactive map of Pu Tuo Si Temple
- Coordinates: 5°59′34″N 116°7′0″E

Architecture
- Type: Chinese temple
- Established: unknown
- Completed: 1980

Website
- kkputuosi.org.my

Pu Tuo Si Temple (also called as Puh Toh Tze Temple or Poh Toh Tse) is a Buddhist temple located off Tuaran Road in Kota Kinabalu, Sabah, Malaysia. The temple was built in 1980 with a statue of Guanyin located in the entrance. It is the main Chinese temple for the city. In 2013, the temple received a total of RM115,000 from the federal government to finance its on-going renovation.

== Features ==
The temple main hall is called the Daxiong Baodian. At the main altar, there is a big statue of Buddha, with a statue of Guanyin in the left and Dashizhi in the right.

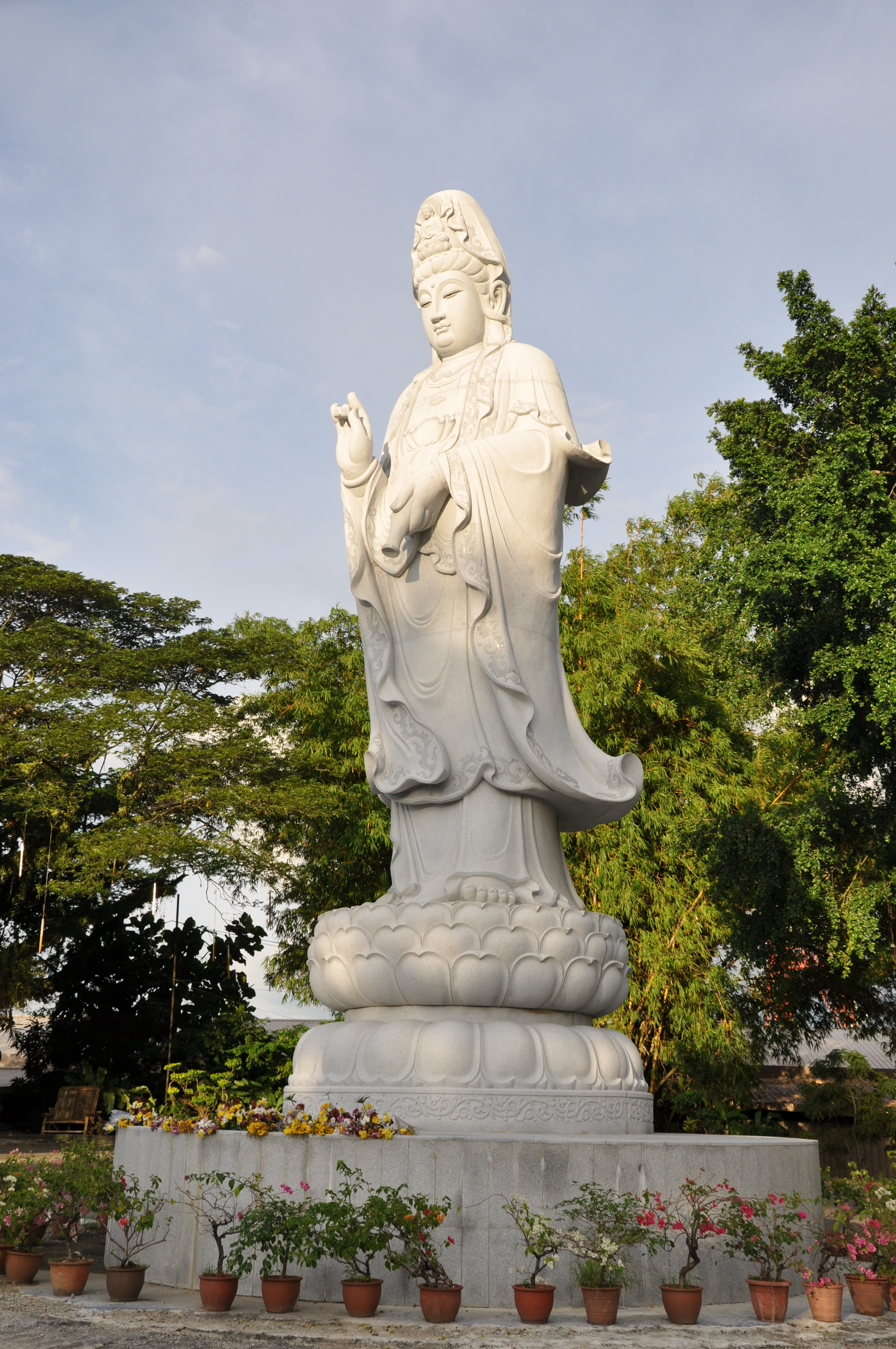
Guanyin statue.

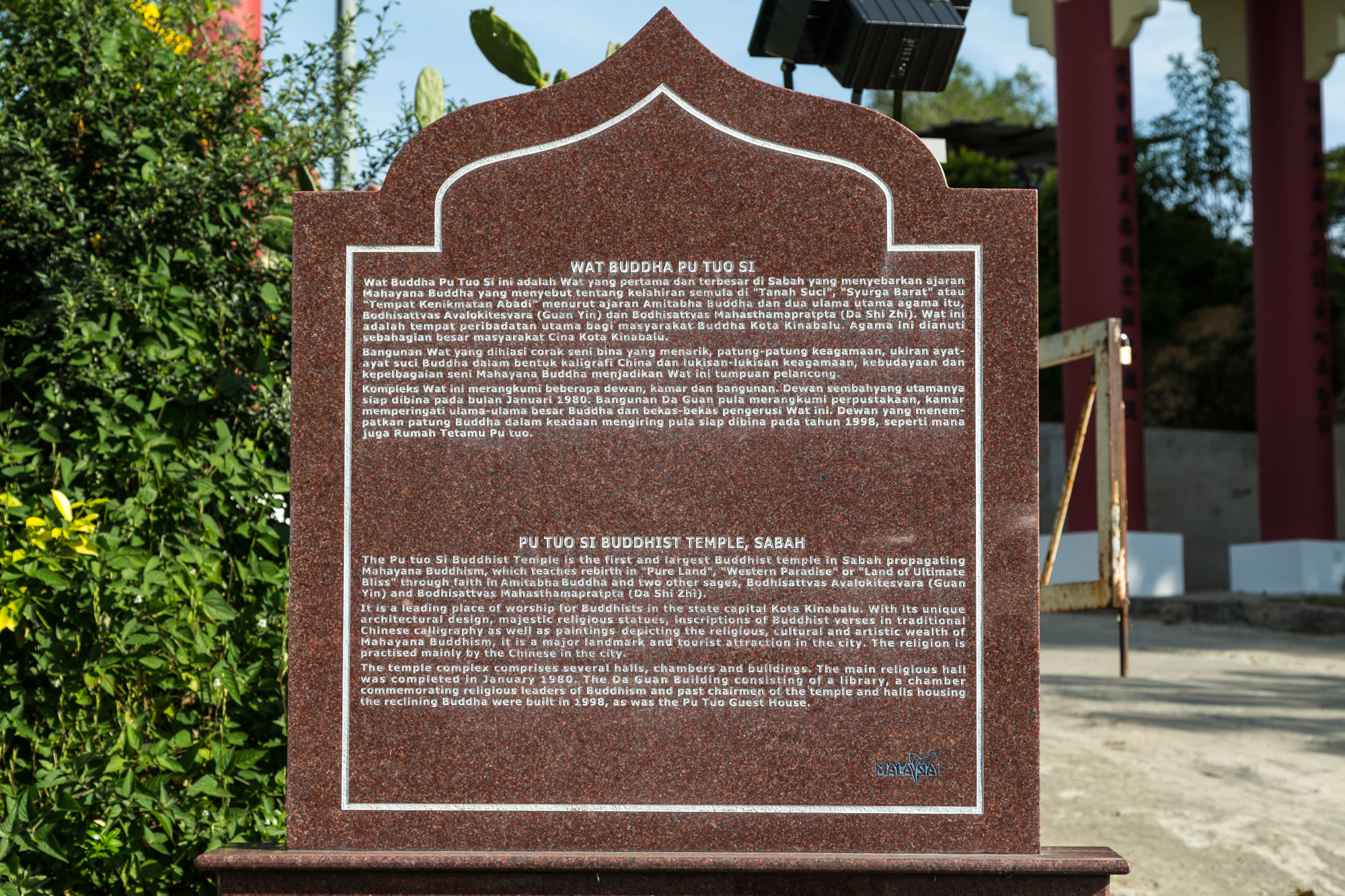
Inscription about the temple.

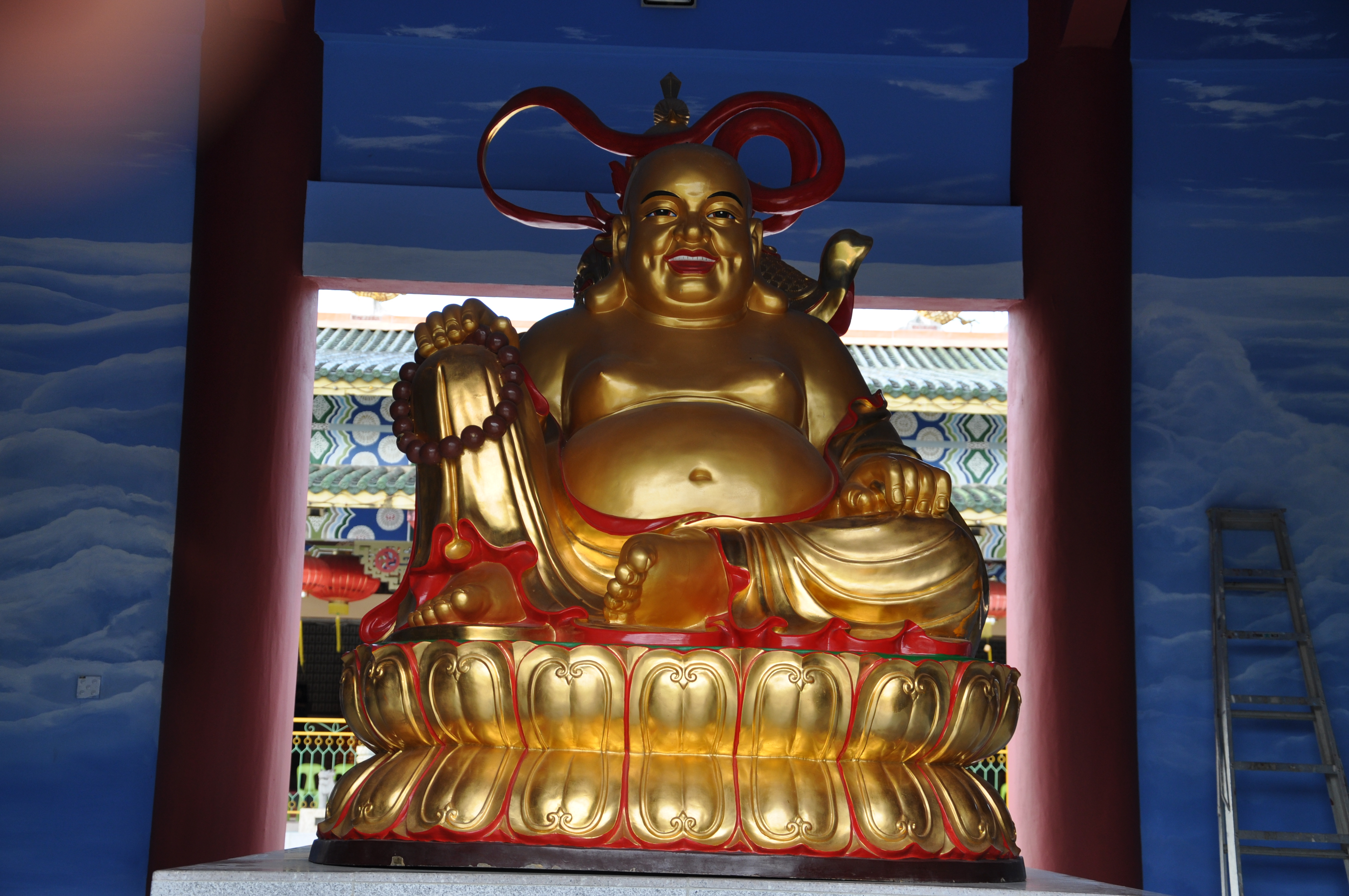
The Laughing Buddha of Budai.

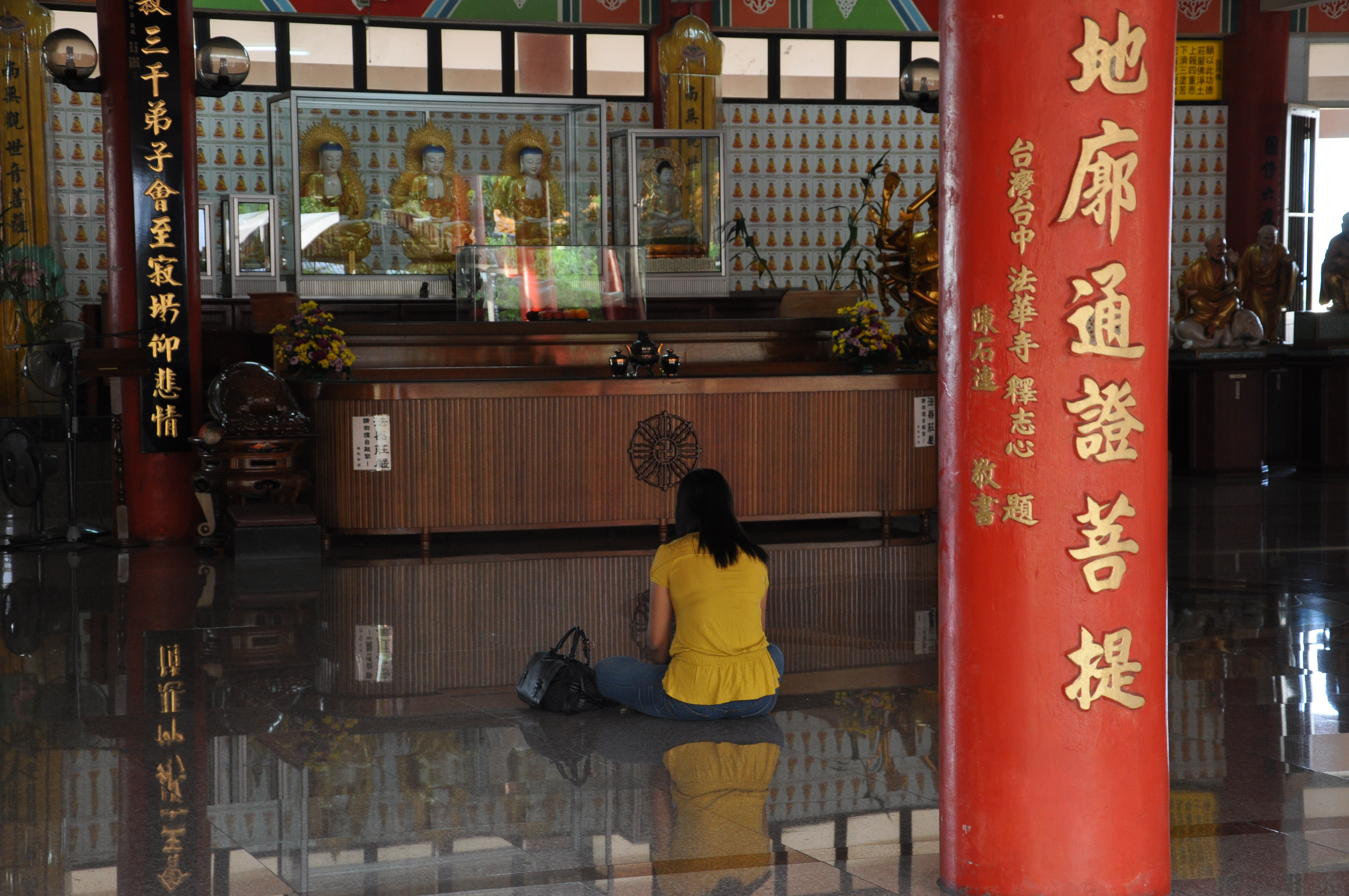
A devout praying in the temple.
