= Mahanavika Buddhagupta =

Stone inscription from Penang

Mahanavika Buddhagupta inscription
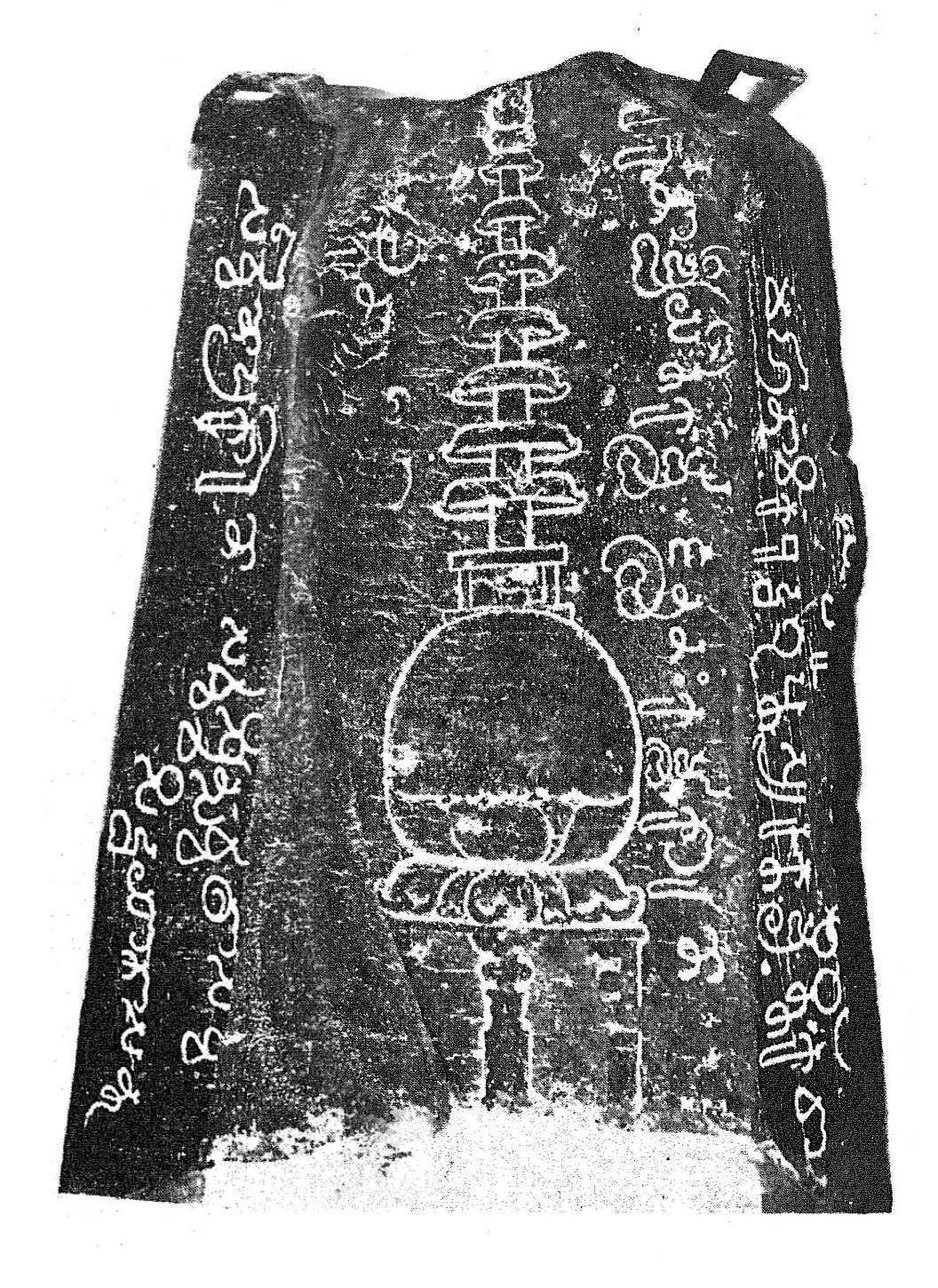
- Rubbing of the Mahanavika Buddhagupta stone inscription, 5th century CE, Indian Museum, Kolkata
- Material: Schist
- Size: 8-9 cm x 66 cm
- Created: 5th century CE
- Discovered: Wellesley Province, Penang, Malaysia
- Present location: Indian Museum, Kolkata

Location

The Mahanavika Buddhagupta ("Great Navigator Buddhagupta") stone inscription, is a 5th-century CE Buddhist stone inscription found in the Wellesley Province, Penang, Malaysia. It was discovered in 1834 by Captain James Low, of the East India Company.

The plaque is in schist, 8–9 cm wide, and 66 cm high. It is today in the Indian Museum in Kolkata.

The plate features the illustration of a Buddhist stupa. The script is Brahmi from South India, and very similar to the script of the inscription of King Purnavarman. Buddhagupta declares in his inscription that he is from Raktamrittika, present-day in Rajbadidanga of Bengal.

The stele exemplifies the links between India and Southeast Asia and that early time, as well as the link between trade and Buddhism.

Another inscription by Mahanavika Buddhagupta, the "Sungai Mas Buddhist stele", was found in Kampong Sungai Mas, Sungai Petani, Kedah, and dated to circa the 5th-6th century CE. It is now in the Muzium Arkeologi Lembah Bujang, Merbok, Malaysia.

== See also ==
- Buddhism in Malaysia
- Bujang Valley
