= Puu Jih Shih Temple =

Buddhist temple in Sandakan, Malaysia

- Malay: Tokong Puu Jih Shih; Chinese: 普济寺
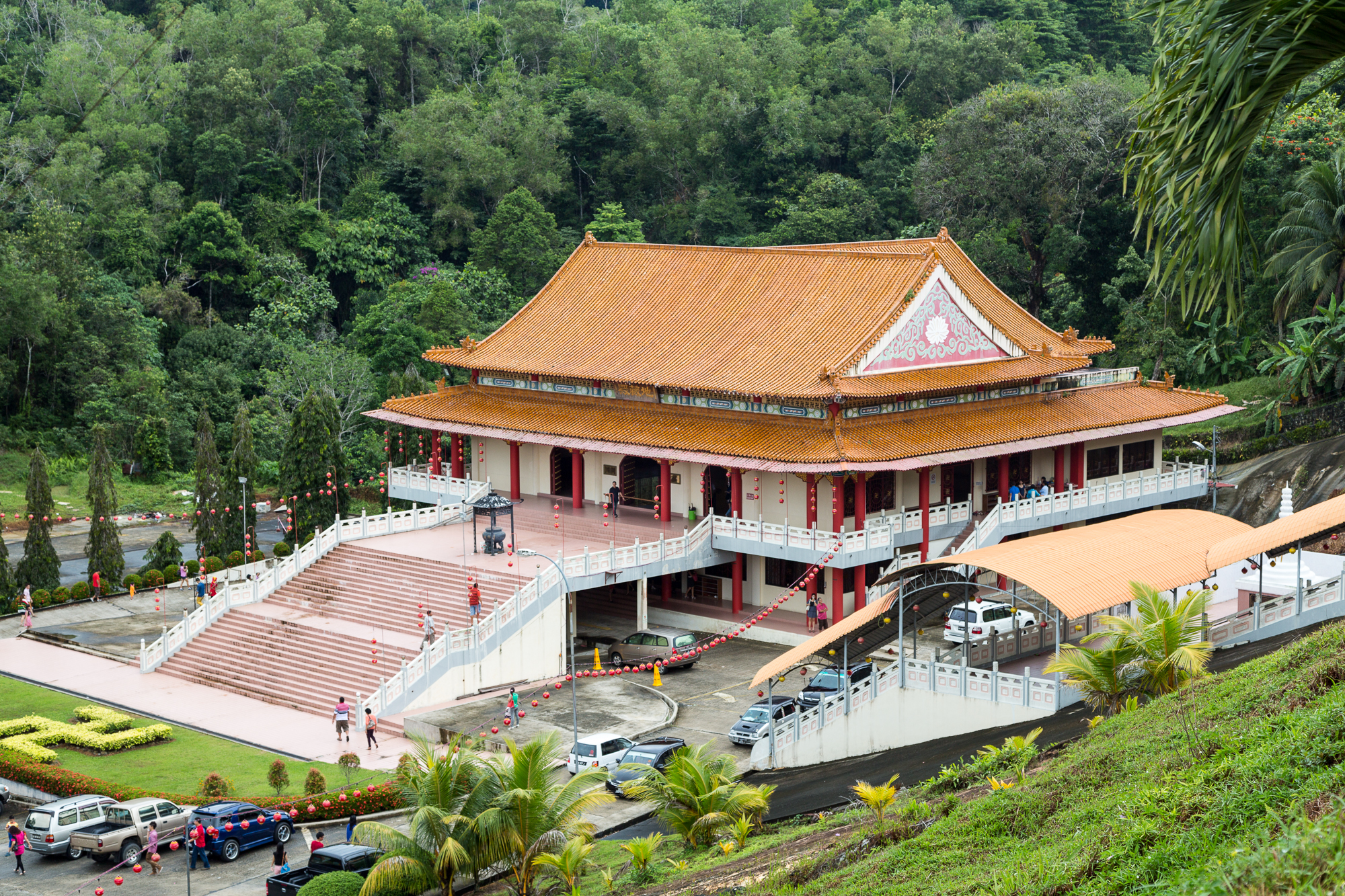
- Puu Jih Shih Temple

Religion
- Affiliation: Buddhism
- District: Sandakan District

Location
- Location: Sandakan
- State: Sabah
- Country: Malaysia
- Interactive map of Puu Jih Shih Temple
- Coordinates: 5°50′3″N 118°5′10″E

Architecture
- Type: Chinese temple
- Established: unknown
- Completed: 1987
- Construction cost: US$2 million

Puu Jih Shih Temple (Chinese: 普济寺) is a Buddhist temple located at the hilltop of Tanah Merah at Sandakan Bay in Sandakan, Sabah, Malaysia. The temple was built in 1987 and officiated by Joseph Pairin Kitingan, the Chief Minister of Sabah at the time. It is the largest Chinese temple for the town and situated around 4 kilometres west of the town centre.

The temple was featured in the American television series of The Amazing Race 4 in 2003.

== Features ==
The temple is located in a hilly area where visitors can view the Sandakan coast. Its surroundings within a forested areas is ablaze with dragon sculpture and gilded Buddhas.

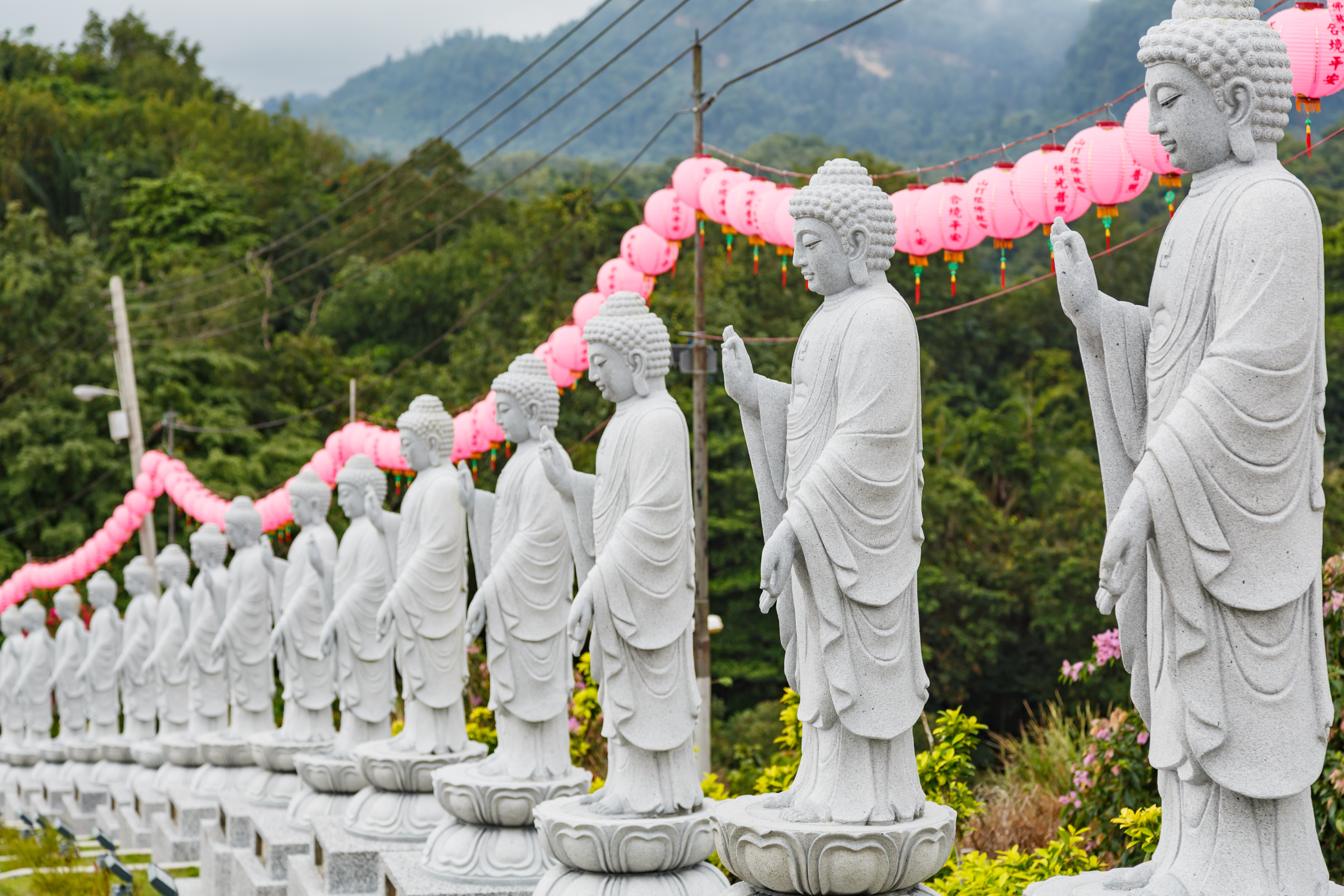
Buddha statues outside the temple.

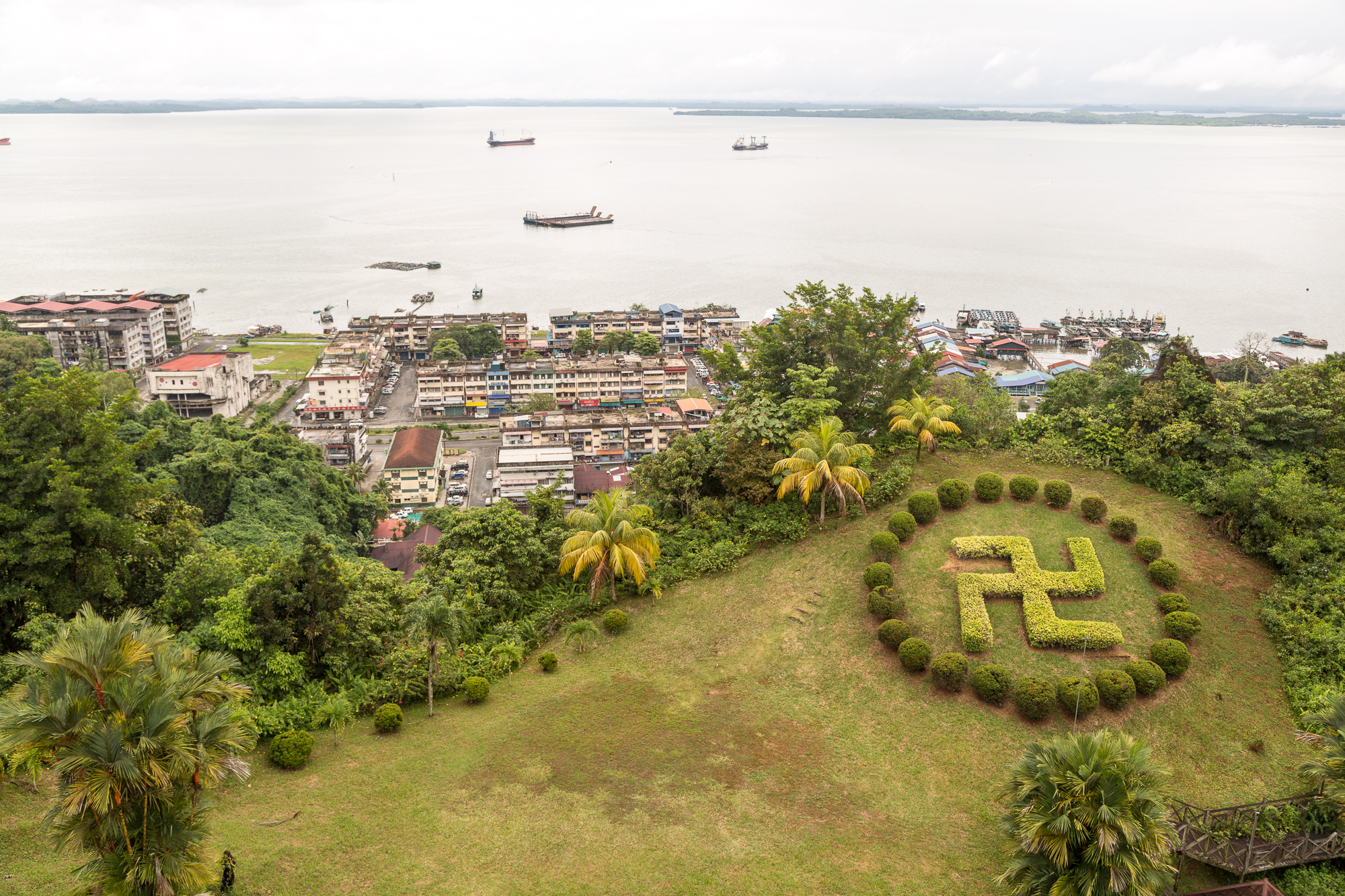
Buddhist swastika in the temple garden.

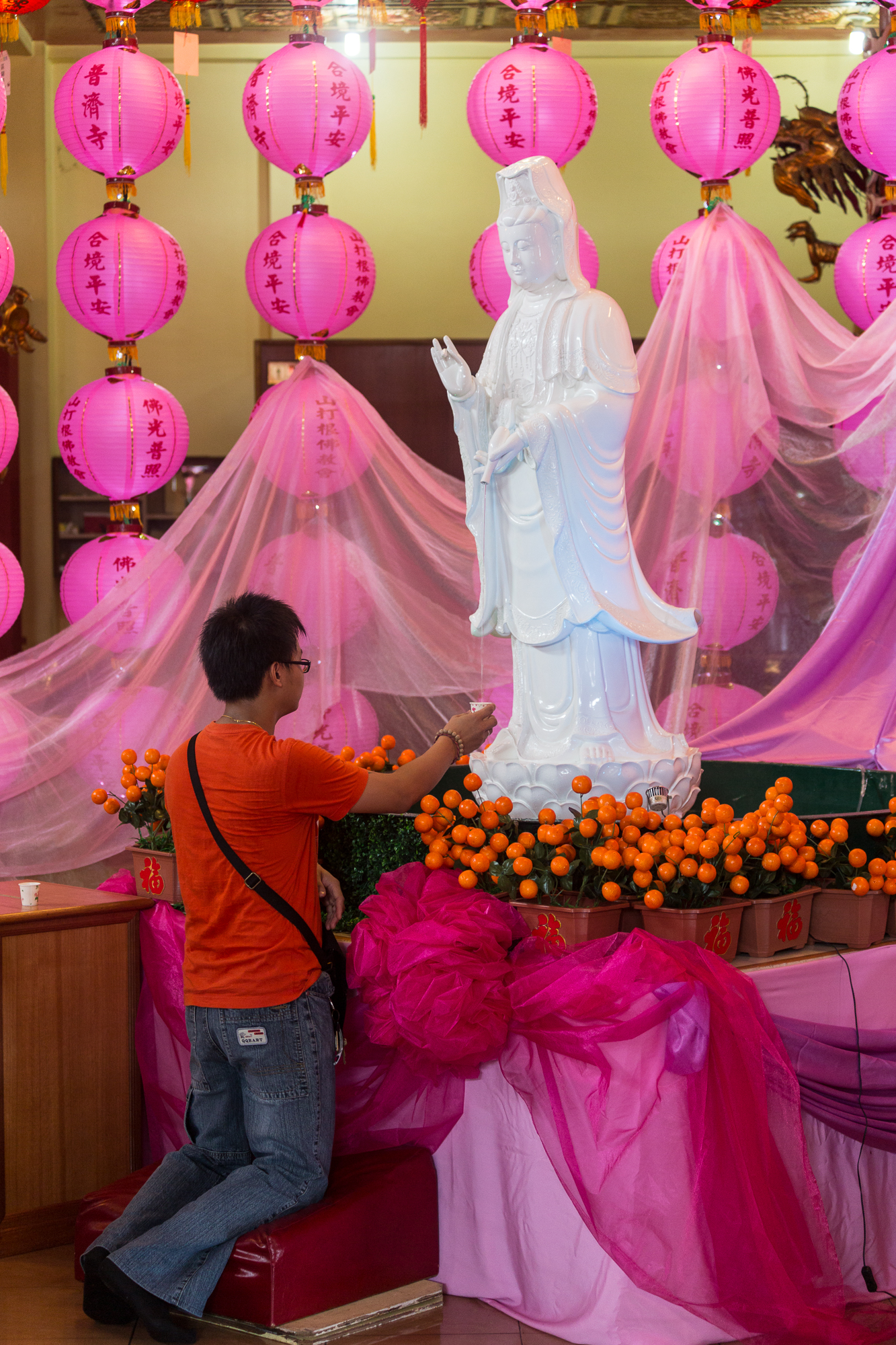
Devotee praying in the temple.

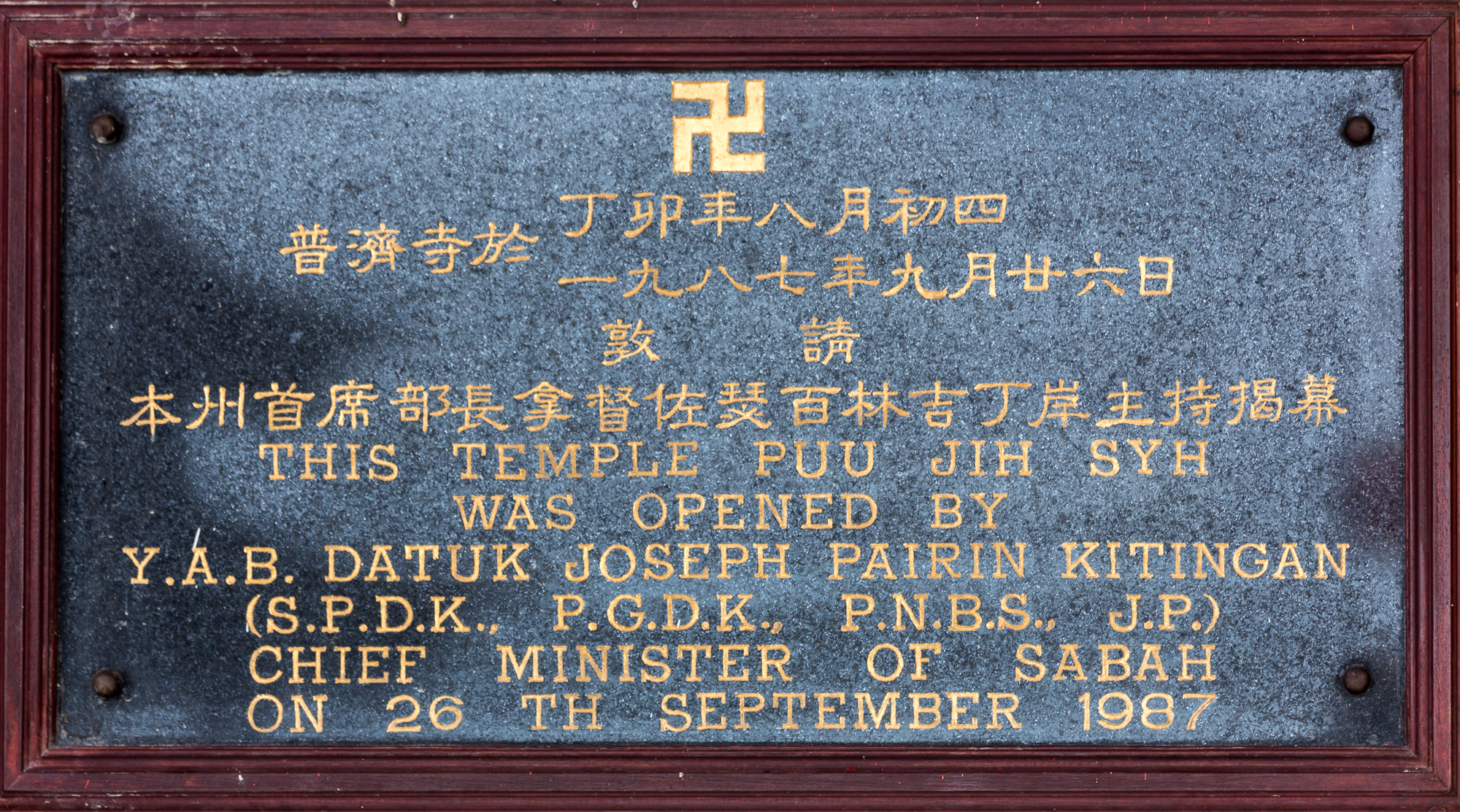
Temple officiation plaque.

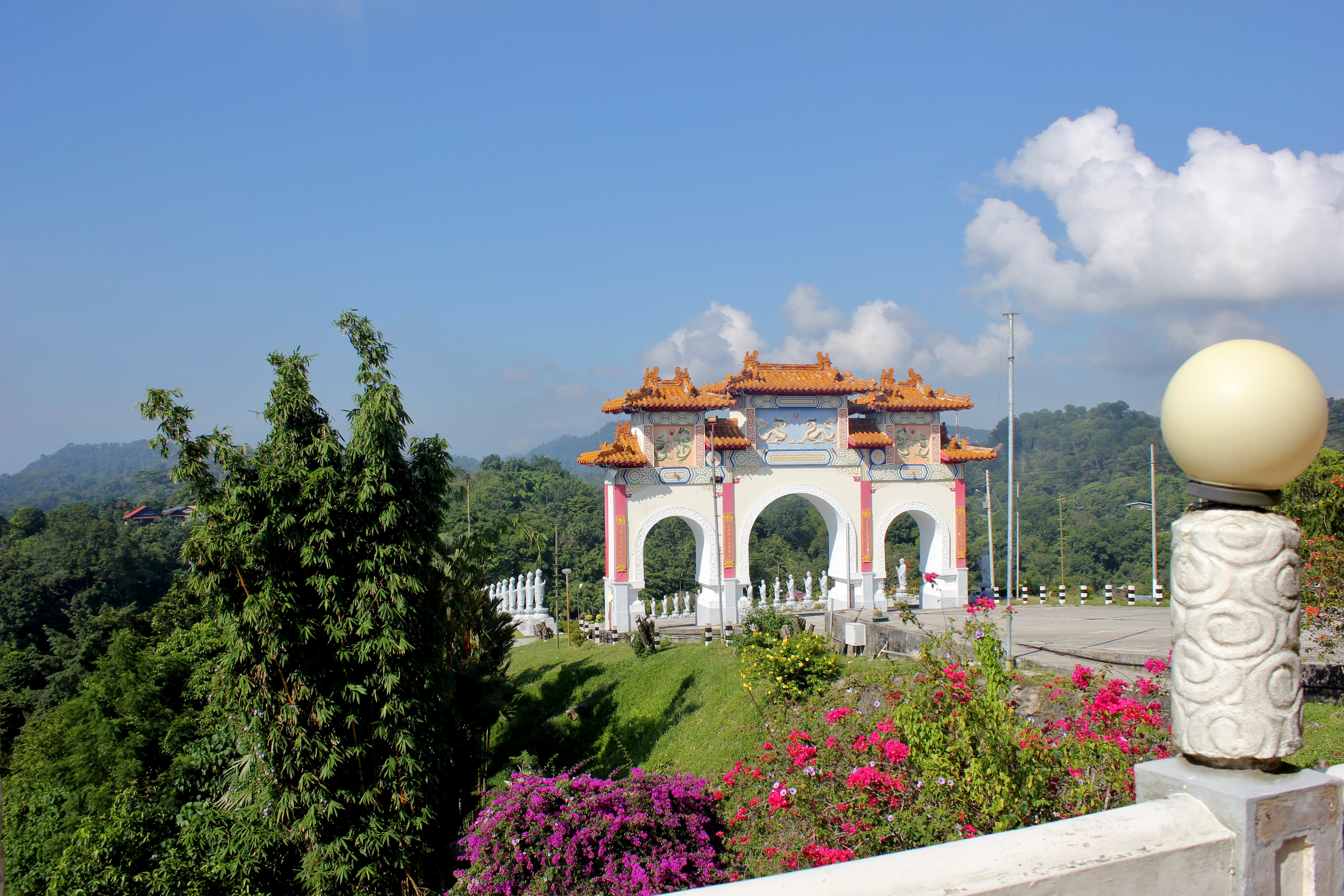
The temple paifang.
