= List of hospitals in Northern Province, Sri Lanka =

The following is a list of hospitals in Northern Province, Sri Lanka. Jaffna Teaching Hospital, the biggest government hospital in the province, is controlled by the central government in Colombo. All other government hospitals in the province are controlled by the provincial government in Jaffna.

== Government hospitals ==
=== Teaching hospitals ===
- Jaffna Teaching Hospital, Jaffna District (central government)

=== District general hospitals ===
- Kilinochchi District General Hospital, Kilinochchi District
- Mannar District General Hospital, Mannar District
- Mullaitivu District General Hospital, Mullaitivu District
- Vavuniya District General Hospital, Vavuniya District

=== Base hospitals (type A) ===
- Point Pedro Base Hospital, Jaffna District
- Tellippalai District Hospital, Jaffna District

=== Base hospitals (type B) ===
- Chavakacheri District Hospital, Jaffna District
- Cheddikulam District Hospital, Vavuniya District
- Kayts District Hospital, Jaffna District
- Maankulam Base Hospital, Mullaitivu District

=== Divisional hospitals (type A) ===
- Mallavi Peripheral Unit, Mullaitivu District
- Puthukkudiyiruppu Rural Hospital, Mullaitivu District

=== Divisional hospitals (type B) ===
- Achchuveli Peripheral Unit, Jaffna District
- Chankanai Peripheral Unit, Jaffna District
- Kopay Peripheral Unit, Jaffna District
- Mulankavil Base Hospital, Kilinochchi District
- Murunkan District Hospital, Mannar District
- Talaimannar District Hospital, Mannar District
- Valvettithurai District Hospital, Jaffna District

=== Divisional hospitals (type C) ===
- Adampan District Hospital, Mannar District
- Akkarayankulam Peripheral Unit, Kilinochchi District
- Alaveddy Central Dispensary and Maternity Home, Jaffna District
- Ampan Central Dispensary and Maternity Home, Jaffna District
- Analativu Peripheral Unit, Jaffna District
- Chilavaturai Rural Hospital, Mannar District
- Delft District Hospital, Jaffna District
- Erukkalampiddy Central Dispensary, Mannar District
- Gurunagar Central Dispensary and Maternity Home, Jaffna District
- Karainagar Peripheral Unit, Jaffna District
- Karaveddy Central Dispensary and Maternity Home, Jaffna District
- Kodikamam Central Dispensary and Maternity Home, Jaffna District
- Kondavil Central Dispensary and Maternity Home, Jaffna District
- Mamaduva Central Dispensary and Maternity Home, Vavuniya District
- Mandativu Central Dispensary and Maternity Home, Jaffna District
- Manipay Central Dispensary and Maternity Home, Jaffna District Jaffna District
- Maruthankerney Rural Hospital, Jaffna District
- Nainativu Peripheral Unit, Jaffna District
- Nanaddan Central Dispensary, Mannar District
- Nedunkerny Peripheral Unit, Vavuniya District
- Neriyakulam Central Dispensary and Maternity Home, Vavuniya District
- Pallai Peripheral Unit, Kilinochchi District
- Pandaterippu Rural Hospital, Jaffna District
- Pesalai Peripheral Unit, Mannar District
- Poonakary Peripheral Unit, Kilinochchi District
- Poovarasankulam Central Dispensary and Maternity Home, Vavuniya District
- Pulliyamkulam Central Dispensary and Maternity Home, Vavuniya District
- Pungudutivu District Hospital, Jaffna District
- Sithamparapuram Central Dispensary and Maternity Home, Vavuniya District
- Tharmapuram Central Dispensary and Maternity Home, Kilinochchi District
- Ulukkulam Rural Hospital, Vavuniya District
- Urithipuram Central Dispensary and Maternity Home, Kilinochchi District
- Vaddukoddai Rural Hospital, Jaffna District
- Vankalai Central Dispensary, Mannar District
- Varany Central Dispensary and Maternity Home, Jaffna District
- Velanai Rural Hospital, Jaffna District
- Veravil Central Dispensary and Maternity Home, Kilinochchi District
- Vidattaltivu Rural Hospital, Mannar District
- Voddakachhi Central Dispensary and Maternity Home, Kilinochchi District

=== Primary medical care units ===
- Alampil Central Dispensary, Mullaitivu District
- Chunnakam Central Dispensary, Jaffna District
- Elephant Pass Central Dispensary, Kilinochchi District
- Erlalai Central Dispensary, Jaffna District
- Ilavali Central Dispensary, Jaffna District
- Inuvil Central Dispensary, Jaffna District
- Iranaiiluppaikulam Central Dispensary, Mannar District
- Iranaitivu Central Dispensary, Kilinochchi District
- Kaithady Central Dispensary, Jaffna District
- Kankesanthurai Central Dispensary, Jaffna District
- Kokkuvil Central Dispensary, Jaffna District
- Mulliyan Central Dispensary, Jaffna District
- Marichukkaddy Central Dispensary, Mannar District
- Mulliyawalai Central Dispensary and Maternity Home, Mullaitivu District
- Naddankandal Central Dispensary and Maternity Home, Mullaitivu District
- Oddusuddan Central Dispensary, Mullaitivu District
- Omanthai Central Dispensary, Vavuniya District
- Palali Central Dispensary, Jaffna District
- Pavatkulam Central Dispensary and Maternity Home, Vavuniya District
- Periyamadu Central Dispensary, Mannar District
- Periyapandivrichchan Central Dispensary, Mannar District
- Point Pedro Central Dispensary, Jaffna District
- Puttur Central Dispensary, Jaffna District
- Thalpuram Central Dispensary, Jaffna District
- Thirukeetheswaram Central Dispensary, Mannar District
- Thunukkai Central Dispensary, Mullaitivu District
- Uduvil Central Dispensary, Jaffna District
- Urumpirai Central Dispensary, Jaffna District
- Vaddukoddai Central Dispensary, Jaffna District
- Vannerikulam Pass Central Dispensary, Kilinochchi District
- Velakulam Central Dispensary, Mannar District

=== Special campaign hospitals ===
- Kankesanthurai Special Campaign Hospital, Jaffna District (located at Kopay Peripheral Unit)

=== Unclassified ===
- Mulliyan Central Dispensary, Kilinochchi District
- Palali Central Dispensary, Kilinochchi District

== Non-profit hospitals ==
- Green Memorial Hospital (Jaffna Diocese of the Church of South India)

== Private hospitals ==
- New Yarl Hospital
- Northern Central Hospital
- Ruhbins Hospital

== See also ==
- List of hospitals in Sri Lanka
