= Abarna Kugathasan =

German fashion designer

- Born: 1995 or 1996 (age 29–30); Germany
- Occupation: Fashion designer

Abarna Kugathasan is a German fashion designer of Tamil descent. Her fashion collections Diaspora Fanatism (stylized in all uppercase) and Kitschy Couture have been featured in the Winter 2022 and 2023 Berlin Fashion Weeks.

== Early life ==
Kugathasan was born in Germany to Sri Lankan Tamils immigrant parents who arrived there in 1994. Her first exposure to fashion was from her mother, a seamstress, who regularly sewed Tamil garments such as saris in their home. Kugathasan attended the Pforzheim University of Applied Sciences.

== Career ==
Kugathasan's designs are heavily inspired by kitsch and Tamil culture. Her first fashion collection, DIASPORA FANATISM, was featured in the Neo Fashion show at Berlin Fashion Week 2022 and was inspired by her culture and childhood. Kugathasan's second collection, Kitschy Couture, was featured in the exhibition curated by Der Berliner Salon (English: The Berliner Salon) at Berlin Fashion Week 2023 and was inspired by lingerie and the fashion of the 2000s. Kugathasan has stated her artistic inspirations to be M.I.A. and Reva Bhatt.
