= Hartley College =

Provincial school in Point Pedro, Sri Lanka

- ஹாட்லிக் கல்லூரி

Location
- Point Pedro, Jaffna District, Northern Province; Sri Lanka
- Coordinates: 9°49′40.20″N 80°13′58.20″E

Information
- School type: Public provincial (APS) 1AB
- Motto: Fiat lux (Let there be light)
- Religious affiliation: Methodism
- Denomination: Methodist Church in Sri Lanka
- Founded: 1838; 188 years ago
- Founder: Peter Percival
- School district: Vadamarachi Education Zone
- School number: 1007026
- Principal: V. Uthayamohan
- Teaching staff: 52
- Grades: 6-13
- Gender: Boys
- Age range: 11-18

Hartley College (Tamil: ஹாட்லிக் கல்லூரி Hāṭlik Kallūri) is a provincial school in Point Pedro, Sri Lanka. Founded in 1838 by British Methodist missionaries, it is one of Sri Lanka's oldest schools. The school is named after Wesleyan priest and missionary Rev. Hartley.

== History ==
Methodist missionaries from Britain arrived in Ceylon on 29 June 1814. The Wesleyan Mission Central School was founded in 1838 by Rev. Dr. Peter Percival. The school is located at the current location of the Methodist Girls' High School. The school transferred to its current site in 1874. The school was renamed Christ Church School in 1912 and Hartley College in 1916.

Most private schools in Ceylon were taken over by the government in 1960. Hartley College becomes a publicly funded school on 1 December 1960.

Following arson by the Sri Lankan government forces in 1984, the school moved to Puttalai from 1985 to 1990. In 1989, the school appeared on a postage stamp issued to commemorate its 150th anniversary. From 1996 to 2002, part of the school was occupied by the Sri Lanka Army, and the school remains in a high security zone. In 2005, part of the school was destroyed by a grenade thrown from a motorcycle.

== Principals ==
- 1838-60 Rev. Dr. Peter Percival
- 1861-68 Rev. D. P. Niles
- 1868- Samuel Hensman
- -1878 J. C. T. Sherrard
- 1906 S. A. Paulpillai
- 1906-12 S. S. Kanapathipillai
- 1912-15 E. S. Abraham
- 1915-43 C. P. Thamotheram
- 1943-67 K. Pooranampillai
- 1967-71 S. Ratnasabapathy
- 1971-73 C. Rajathurai
- 1973-75 P. Ahamparam
- 1975-85 W. N. S. Samuel
- 1985-93 P. Balasingam
- 1993-97 K. Nadarajah
- 1997-99 P. Venugopalavanithasan
- 1999-00 N. Gunaseelan
- 2000-02 M. Sripathy
- 2003-05 V. Pathmanathan
- 2005-14 N. Theivendraraja
- 2014-21 T. Mugunthan
- 2021-24 T. Kalaichelvan
- 2025–present V. Uthayamohan

== Notable teachers ==
Name	Year	Notability	Reference
K. S. Arulnandhy		Deputy Director of Education (1946–1950)	
Herbert Thambiah		Chief Justice of Sri Lanka (1991)	

== Notable alumni ==
Name	Notability	Reference
K. Alvapillai	Permanent Secretary – Minister of Agriculture and Food (1953–1959), Permanent Secretary – Minister of Commerce and Trade (1959–1965)	
T. E. Anandaraja	Inspector General of Police (2002–2003)	
V. Anandasangaree	member of parliament – Jaffna (2000–2004), Kilinochchi (1970–1983)	
K. D. Arulpragasam	Vice-Chancellor Eastern University, Sri Lanka (1986–1989)	
Christie Jayaratnam Eliezer	Dean – School of Physical Sciences La Trobe University, Dean – Faculty of Science University of Malaya, Dean – Faculty of Science University of Ceylon	
K. Ganeshalingam	Mayor of Colombo (1996–1997)	
A. Gnanathasan	Deputy Solicitor General (1999–2008)	
K. Kanapathypillai	head – Department of Tamil University of Ceylon (1947–1965)	
Ian Karan	Minister of Economic Affairs for Hamburg (2010–2011), Member of Senate of Hamburg	
C. Loganathan	General Manager Bank of Ceylon (1953–1969)	
Captain Miller (Vallipuram Vasanthan)	Member of Liberation Tigers of Tamil Eelam, first Black Tiger	
M. Nadarajasundaram	dean – Management Studies and Commerce University of Jaffna (1999–2005)	
P. B. Premachandra	Air Vice Marshall Chief of staff Air Force (2006 – 2011)	
Annalingam Premashankar	Judge of the Court of Appeal of Sri Lanka since 2025	
J. M. Rajaratnam	Vice President Singer Company	
Rudra Rajasingham	Inspector General of Police (1982–1985)	
K. B. Ratnayake	Speaker Parliament of Sri Lanka (1994–2000), Governor of Central Province (2001–2002)	
Vaithilingam Sornalingam	(aka Colonel Shankar) A member of Liberation Tigers of Tamil Eelam	
M. Sivapalan	engineer, hydrologist, academic	
C. J. T. Thamotheram	educationalist, founder Association of Commonwealth Teachers	
A. Thurairajah	Vice-Chancellor University of Jaffna (1988–1994)	
A. Veluppillai	academic, historian, author	
Ratnasiri Wickremanayake	Prime Minister (2000–2001, 2005–2010), member parliament – Horana (1960–1977), Kalutara (1994–2010)	

== See also ==
- List of schools in Northern Province, Sri Lanka
