= FFQ =

FFQ may refer to:

- Fédération des femmes du Québec
- Food frequency questionnaire
