= K. D. Arulpragasam =

Professor K. D. Arulpragasam

1st Vice-Chancellor of the Eastern University, Sri Lanka
- In office 1986–1989

Personal details
- Born: Kandiah David Arulpragasam; 16 September 1931
- Died: 7 August 2003 (aged 71) Colombo, Sri Lanka
- Education: S. Thomas' College; St. John's College; Hartley College; Ananda College; University of Ceylon; University of Wales; University of Southampton
- Profession: Academic
- Ethnicity: Sri Lankan Tamil

Professor Kandiah David Arulpragasam (16 September 1931 – 7 August 2003) was a Sri Lankan Tamil academic. He was the first vice-chancellor of Eastern University, Sri Lanka.

== Early life and family ==
Arulpragasam was born on 16 September 1931. He was educated at the S. Thomas' College, Mount Lavinia, St. John's College, Jaffna, Hartley College and Ananda College. After school he joined the University of Ceylon, Colombo from where he graduated with BSc degree in zoology. He then went to the UK for postgraduate studies. He gained a Phd in marine zoology from the University of Wales. He then did post-doctoral training in oceanography at the University of Southampton.

Arulpragasam never married but lived with his brother (Arulanantham) and sister-in-law (Padma).

== Career ==
Arulpragasam joined the Department of Zoology at the Faculty of Science, University of Colombo, becoming Professor of Zoology in 1973. He was Dean of the Faculty of Science for a couple of years.

Arulpragasam was appointed Director of Batticaloa University College in April 1985. The college was given full university status in October 1986 and Arulpragasam became its first vice-chancellor.

In October 1996 Arulpragasam was appointed Vice Chairman (Planning) of the second National Education Commission. He was chairman of the Central Environmental Authority and First Associate Director of the Institute of Fundamental Studies. He was also a member of the University Grants Commission and the Governing Council of the National Aquatic Research and Resources Development Authority. He was president of the National Academy of Sciences between 1995 and 1997.

== Death ==
Arulpragasam died in Colombo on 7 August 2003.

=== Selected Research Publications ===
- Arudpragasam K.D. and Costa H.H. Atyidae of Ceylon.I. Crustaceana, 1962; 4: 1-24.
- Arudpragasam K.D. and Naylor E. Gill ventilation and the role of reversed respiratory currents in Carcinus maenas. Journal of Experimental Biology, 1964; 41: 299–307.
- Arudpragasam K.D. and Naylor E. Gill ventilation volumes, oxygen consumption and respiratory rhythms in Carcinus maenas. Journal of Experimental Biology, 1964; 41: 309–321.
- Arudpragasam K.D. and Naylor E. Patterns of gill ventilation in some decapod Crustacea. Journal of Zoology, 1966; 150: 401–411.
- Arudpragasam K.D. and Ranatunga KW. On the ecology of a sandstone reef at Duwa (Ceylon). Ceylon Journal of Science (Bio Sci.) 1966; 6(1): 26-32.
- Arudpragasam K.D. Zonation on two shores on the west coast of Ceylon. Journal of Marine Biological Association of India. Jun-Dec 1970; 12(1-2): 1-14.
- Yosida TH, Moriwaki K, Kato H, Tsuchiya K, Sabaratnam M, Arulpragasam KD, Fernando HE. Notes on the distribution of the Ceylonese type Black rats in Sri Lanka.

 Proceedings of Japan Academy, ser. B, 1979; 55: 351-356.
