= Ian Karan =

- இயன் கிருகரன்
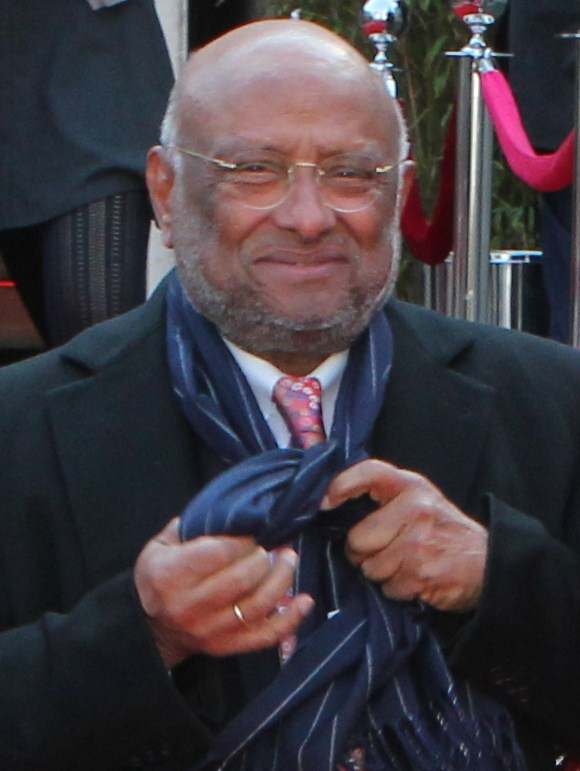
- Ian Karan in 2011

Hamburg State Minister of the Economic Affairs and Employment
- In office 25 August 2010 – 7 March 2011
- Preceded by: Axel Gedaschko
- Succeeded by: Frank Horch

Personal details
- Born: Ian Kirupakaran; 17 June 1939 (age 87) Point Pedro, Ceylon
- Party: Christian Democratic Union of Germany
- Occupation: Businessman

Ian Kiru Karan (born Ian Kirupakaran; 17 June 1939) is a Tamil German businessman and politician.

== Early life and family ==
Kirupakaran was born on 17 June 1939 at Point Pedro Hospital in northern Ceylon. His family were from Kaddaively near Karaveddy in the Vadamarachchi region. Orphaned at a young age, he was educated at Methodist Girls' High School, Point Pedro and Hartley College. After being expelled from Hartley College in 1955, he, with the help of his church, obtained an athletics scholarship to study in London. He then joined the London School of Economics (LSE) but was expelled for non-attendance. Karan had falsely claimed that he was expelled from LSE for participating in Vietnam War protests. Europeans found it difficult to pronounce his name so upon obtaining British citizenship Kirupakaran changed his name to Ian Kiru Karan.

Karan has married twice and has four children (Navena, Oliver, Jessica and Niclas). He is a Christian.

== Career ==
Karan joined Schenker & Co. Ltd, London, a shipping and forwarding subsidiary of a German conglomerate Schenker AG, in 1966 as a management trainee. In 1969 he moved to Switzerland, working as a clerk for the container firm Crowe & Co in Basel. He then moved to Hamburg in 1970, working as a dishwasher at a vegetarian restaurant. After three months he joined the Max Grünhut shipping company as a clerk. He was promoted to departmental manager a year later. He then entered the container business, working as managing director of Lyons Container (Hamburg) and NIC Lease Ltd (Chicago). He went into business on his own in 1975, setting up Container Leasing Agency which served as an agent for his former employer. In 1977 his company, which was now building containers and leasing them, changed its name to CLOU (Container Leasing Company). He sold his company to an Anglo-American competitor in 1993.

After observing a three-year non-compete clause, Karan re-entered the container leasing business in 1996, establishing Capital Lease GmbH in Hamburg. The company, whose worldwide operations were based in Hong Kong, became the fastest growing container leasing company in the world and after four years it became the largest leasing company in Europe. The company was reportedly worth US$400 million. Karan was nicknamed "container king". The highly profit-making company became the seventh largest container company in the world with over 520,000 TEUs. Karan sold Capital Lease to two banks just before the financial crash.

Though not a member of any political party, Karan had supported the controversial Party for a Rule of Law Offensive and its leader Ronald Schill, donating 44,500 euros to the party. He then supported the Christian Democratic Union of Germany (CDU), donating it 570,000 euros over several years. After the CDU took control of the Government of Hamburg, Karan was sworn in as Hamburg's Minister of the Economic Affairs and Employment on 25 August 2010. He resigned on 7 March 2011.

Karan established the Ian Karan Auditorium in the Bucerius Kunst Forum and an auditorium for medical students at the University of Hamburg. He was chairman of the board of trustees of the Hamburg Theatre Festival and is a member of the supervisory board of Hamburger SV. He was awarded the Federal Cross of Merit in June 2007 for his social and cultural work. Karan was a British citizen for over forty years before taking up German citizenship in December 2009, allegedly on the recommendations of German Chancellor Angela Merkel. Karan later admitted that Merkel never made such a recommendation.
