= Sivapalan =

Sivapalan சிவபாலன்
- Pronunciation: Civapālaṉ
- Gender: Male
- Language: Tamil

Origin
- Meaning: Child of Shiva
- Region of origin: Southern India; North-eastern Sri Lanka

Sivapalan (Tamil: சிவபாலன்) is a Tamil male given name. Due to the Tamil tradition of using patronymic surnames it may also be a surname for males and females.

== Notable people ==
=== Given name ===
- M. Sivapalan (born 1953), Sri Lankan engineer, hydrologist and academic
- Pon Sivapalan (c1952–1998), Sri Lankan politician
- S. Sivapalan (c1890–1960), Ceylonese politician
