= The American Batticaloa Development Fund =

The American-Batticaloa Development Fund
- Founded: 2007
- Founder: Bennett Hinkley
- Type: ABDF.org is dedicated to raising funds to donate to small-scale projects that are needed by the people of this region of Sri Lanka.
- Location(s): Santa Monica, CA, USA & Batticaloa, Sri Lanka
- Region served: Batticaloa District, Sri Lanka
- Website: https://www.abdf.org/

The American-Batticaloa Development Fund (ABDF.org) is a small American-based non-profit development organization operating in the Batticaloa District of Sri Lanka. The organization sponsors a series of low-cost micro-development projects with the objective of improving the lives of recipients in an immediate and tangible way. Projects range from supplying clean drinking water, providing electricity, building roads, and supplying materials for schools.

== Background ==
Batticaloa District is located on the eastern seaboard of Sri Lanka. It is populated primarily by Tamil speaking Hindus (the majority), Muslims, and Christians, although there is also a minority of Sinhalese-speaking Buddhists. The District has seen over 25 years of inter-ethnic and religious violence and is a major arena of the Sri Lankan civil war. As a result, it is one of the most under-developed regions of the country. Adding to the trauma of civil conflict came the 2004 tsunami, which devastated Sri Lanka, particularly the east coast.

== History ==
ABDF.org was first conceived in 2005 when Bennett Hinkley (now ABDF.org's Program Director) traveled to Batticaloa as an independent volunteer in the wake of the 2004 Boxing Day Tsunami. After four months of work, Bennett realized three things: first, though the tsunami was devastating, the trauma it caused was dwarfed by the effects of 25 years of civil and ethnic conflict. Second, despite the global outpouring of aid for the victims, few resources reached people who needed the most help. Third, the efficient and focused targeting of small amounts of money can have a large impact on the lives of the recipients.

All ABDF.org projects cost under $1,500US, and would never appear on the radar of large aid organizations. In fact some of the projects involve completing the leftover bits and pieces either forgotten about or ignored by the large agencies on their own projects.

ABDF.org was granted 501(c)(3) status in 2007, and began its first year of formal operations in 2008.

Program Director Bennett Hinkley lives in Batticaloa eight months of the year, and thus has the opportunity to understand the community and its needs. This allows ABDF.org to distinguish between those who are truly in need from the opportunists, establish contacts around the District, and help local community and grassroots organizations help themselves. In addition, Bennett's familiarity with the District and its people allows ABDF.org to avoid the political and ethnic pitfalls that often mire the operations of larger, less integrated aid agencies.

ABDF.org is entirely funded through small individual donations, and the Program Director makes sure that the recipients understand that the help they receive does not fall from the sky from some government or wealthy agency, but rather from the efforts of ordinary Americans who feel the people of Batticaloa are worth caring about. ABDF.org stresses the connection between the individual donor and the individual recipient.

== Policies ==
ABDF.org takes a neutral stance towards the ongoing civil conflict in Sri Lanka; concern is for the people of the District, not whatever political, ethnic or religious group they belong to. ABDF.org assigns projects regardless of religion, caste, and ethnic group. It does not partner with local organizations affiliated with or supporting the various political factions to be found in Batticaloa. ABDF.org does encourage projects that promote inter-ethnic and inter-religious harmony.

Project size is kept small, generally under $1,500. This reduces any chance of corruption. The modest scope of these projects allows Program Director Bennett Hinkley to keep a close eye on the money to ensure it is spent efficiently and with transparency. These micro-projects are the kind often ignored by the large agencies (when they notice them at all) and there are thousands of small-needs possibilities; by keeping the per-project limit low, ABDF.org can in effect spread the money around, doing a large number of quick, often simple yet vital projects.

The American-Batticaloa Development Fund chooses its projects primarily by keeping its ear to the ground and finding out what the people need, rather than deciding what it will grant the community. This is done through individual contacts, as well as partnering with local community and grass-roots organizations such as the local Society of St. Vincent de Paul, The Irish-Sri Lankan Friendship Society, the Islamic Women's Association for Research and Empowerment (IWARE), the Batticaloa Education Development Society, the Jephcott Charitable Trust, Synergy, Eastern University of Sri Lanka, the Muslim Peace Secretariat, local parent-teacher associations, and the community councils of tsunami-resettlement villages. As a result, ABDF.org project sites include schools, rural villages, tsunami-resettlements, and orphanages.

Two aspects of ABDF.org's mission involve money indirectly. The Program Director has several years of grant writing and management experience, and has worked as an accountant for many years. This allows him to train local people to professionally write and manage their own grants for their own organizations. His extensive contacts and local knowledge allows him to assist other outsiders organize and carry out their own projects within the District. In 2008 he was able to help foreigners carry out projects in the areas of orphanages, schools, and housing. The amount of money brought in was several times greater than ABDF.org's own project budget, and while ABDF.org can't claim credit for these projects, it is safe to say that without help from ABDF.org, these projects would not have happened.

== Money & Staff ==
ABDF.org relies entirely on individual contributions. As a result, ABDF.org must do as much work as possible with only a tiny budget. Program Director Bennett Hinkley lives in Batticaloa as a volunteer, without salary, living on his savings while in Sri Lanka. ABDF.org has no paid staff whatsoever, relying entirely on volunteers.

== Completed Projects ==
In its first year of operations ABDF.org completed several significant projects. They include:

The Navatkadu Water Tank. Navatkadu is a hamlet in the interior that until the summer of 2007 was under the control of the LTTE Liberation Tamil Tigers of Eelam (LTTE), the rebel group fighting against the Sri Lankan Government. Having no source of drinking water, the villagers were reliant on a government water truck which drove through the village once a day. If you missed the truck, your family had no water. ABDF.org, in co-operation with the local District Secretary, built a 5,000 liter water tank. Now the water truck fills the tank and the villagers have access to clean water all day. This project has proven so popular and effective that two nearby villages have requested tanks of their own.

The Kaluwankerny Computer Lab. A coastal hamlet of fisher-folk, Kaluwankerny has a single school to serve all the children of the area. In 2006 they were given computers, but no resources to get them set up and running. As a result, the computers and printers were sitting in a storage area, still in their boxes, unopened. Seeing what a waste of resources this was, in 2008 ABDF.org provided the funds to set up a computer lab, complete with computer tables and chairs, and brought in technicians to set up and network the computers themselves. Now the school is fully wired, and even has internet access.

Thiraimadhu Seedling Project. The coastal villages of Kallady and Navalady were devastated by the tsunami. The survivors from both villages were resettled inland in an area called Thiraimadhu. ABDF.org was asked to supply 2,000 coconut seedlings for the village. Once planted, the seedlings will begin to bear fruit in five years. Coconut is an integral part of Sri Lankan cuisine, and besides supplying shade, the mature palms will provide food, as well as income from the sale of excess coconuts. After six months of nursery care, the seedlings were given to the villagers in October 2008. Since then, ABDF.org has received a request to fund community gardens to help the tsunami refugees become more food-independent.

The Sri Krishna School Electricity Project. Located in the village of Valachchenai, Sri Krishna School hosts students from nearby farming areas, as well as the kids from a nearby war-displacement camp. In 2007 the school received a beautiful two-storied school building, complete with ceiling fans, a well and water pump system, a large kitchen (the students receive both breakfast and lunch at the school) and other amenities. The building, furniture, and supplies cost millions of rupees to build. However, for whatever reason no one bothered to hook the building to the local power grid; the power lines for which run directly across the street. This resulted in the children trying to study in the sweltering dark, with a waterless kitchen and toilets that didn't work. As the families of the children are all sustenance farmers, the chance of the school collecting the 15,000 rupees (about $150US) from the parents was non-existent. Recognizing the huge waste of time, energy and money this represented, ABDF.org provided the funds to connect the building to the power grid, thus giving the children a comfortable environment conducive towards their education.

Other projects have included the digging of wells, providing materials for a gravel road in a tsunami resettlement village, donating books to a local girls' school, scholarship money for an impoverished medical student, and repairing the homes of destitute widows with no living relatives.

== Sources ==
- US Dept of State, Country Notes
- Human Rights Commission Report April 2003
