= Murugesu Sivapalan =

Sri Lankan Tamil hydrologist

Professor M. Sivapalan
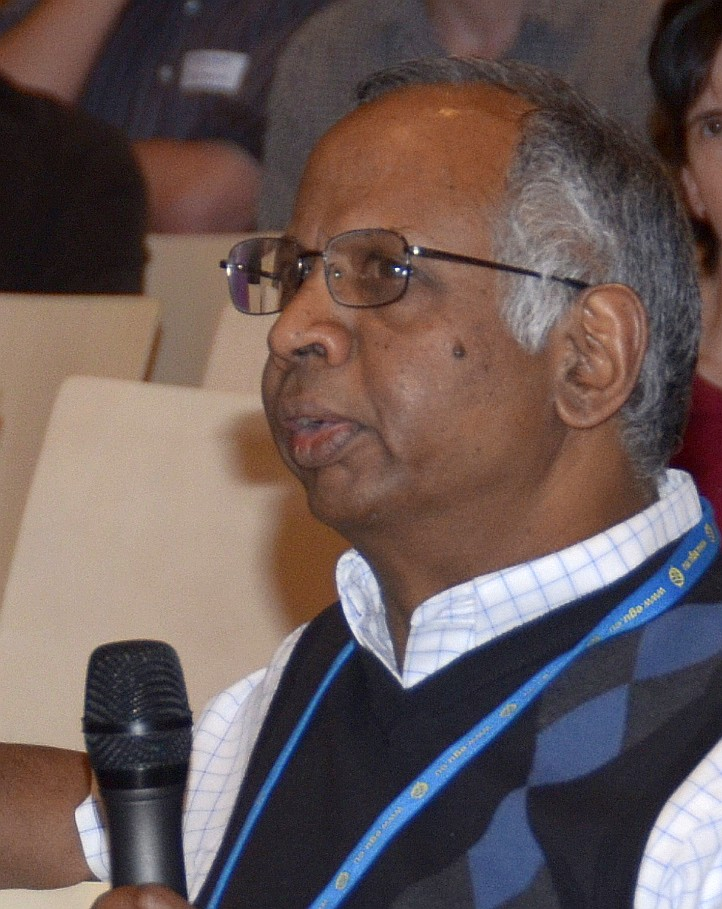
- Sivapalan in 2022
- Born: 19 April 1953 (age 73); Sri Lanka
- Education: University of Sri Lanka; Asian Institute of Technology; Princeton University
- Occupation: Academic
- Known for: Scale Issues in Hydrologic Modeling, Predictions in ungauged basins, Predictions under change and Scio-hydrology.
- Awards: Alfred Wegener Medal, 2017. Prince Sultan Bin Abdulaziz International Prize for Water, 2018. The Robert E. Horton Medal, 2011.

Murugesu Sivapalan is an Australian-American engineer and hydrologist of Sri Lankan Tamil origin and a world leader in the area of catchment hydrology. He is currently the Chester and Helen Siess Endowed Professor of Civil and Environmental Engineering, and professor of Geography & Geographic Information Science, at the University of Illinois, Urbana-Champaign. Sivapalan is widely recognized for his fundamental research on scale issues in hydrological modeling, his leadership of global initiatives aimed at hydrologic predictions in ungauged basins, and for his role in launching the new sub-field of socio-hydrology.

== Early life and family ==
Sivapalan was born on 19 April 1953, in Karaveddy in northern Sri Lanka. He was the son of Sangarapillai and Umadevy Murugesu. He is married to Banumathy. They have two sons: Mayuran and Kavin.

== Education ==
Sivapalan had his high school education at Hartley College, Point Pedro. After school, he joined the University of Ceylon, Peradeniya, and graduated from its successor, the University of Sri Lanka Peradeniya campus in 1975 with a BSc. degree in civil engineering. He later received an MEng degree in water resources engineering from the Asian Institute of Technology in Bangkok, Thailand in 1977. Subsequently, he obtained the M.A. (1983) and PhD (1986) degrees in civil engineering, with a specialization in hydrology from Princeton University. In 2012, Sivapalan was awarded the Honorary Doctorate by Delft University of Technology.

== Career path ==
In 1975, Sivapalan worked briefly at the Faculty of Engineering, University of Sri Lanka (Peradeniya campus) as an instructor in civil engineering. Later in 1977, he worked as a research associate in the Division of Water Resources Engineering Asian Institute of Technology. Between 1978 and 1981, he worked as a geotechnical engineer for Rocks & Stones Ltd., a consulting engineering company based in Ibadan, Nigeria. Between 1986 and 1988, upon completion of his PhD, Sivapalan served as a post-doctoral research associate at Princeton University's department of civil engineering and operations research.

In 1988 Sivapalan migrated to Australia, and between 1988 and 2005, he worked at the Centre for Water Research, Department of Environmental Engineering in the University of Western Australia, joining as a lecturer (1988) and subsequently being promoted to senior lecturer (1992), associate professor (1995) and professor (1999).

Sivapalan joined the University of Illinois at Urbana-Champaign in 2005. He became Chester and Helen Siess Endowed Professor of Civil and Environmental Engineering in April 2015.

Sivapalan has also been Visiting Professor at Vienna University of Technology, Delft University of Technology, and University of Technology Sydney. He held the Satish Dhawan Visiting Chair Professorship at the Indian Institute of Science, Bengaluru.

== Research achievements ==
Sivapalan has introduced many hydrological concepts, theories, and research methods throughout his career. His academic career can be divided into three distinct phases.

=== Phase 1. Extrapolation Across Scales: Scale Issues in Hydrologic Predictions ===
During his PhD studies and in the ten years afterward (1989–1998), Sivapalan devoted himself to research on scale issues in hydrological predictions. This research led successively to several new concepts: hydrologic scale concept that covers "hydrologic process scale", "observation scale" and "modeling scale" temporally and spatially; hydrological similarity concept that connects the watershed heterogeneity and flood frequency analyses; the representative elementary area (REA) concept that deals with the effects of small scale spatial variability of catchments in an aggregate way; meta channel concept which collapses the stream network of a catchment into a single channel with effective hydraulic properties. His review paper with Günter Blöschl on scale issues in hydrological modeling has now become a classic. He organized successful workshops on scale issues in Robertson, Australia, in 1993 and in Krumbach, Austria, in 1996, which had a major impact on the field.

=== Phase 2. Extrapolation Across Places: Predictions in Ungauged Basins ===
From1999 to 2008, Sivapalan focused on the development of hydrological models at the catchment scale. He approached the problem from the bottom up and top down. He and his doctoral student Paolo Reggiani proposed a/the thermodynamic theory framework to formulate balance equations for mass, momentum, and energy at the catchment scale and associated constitutive theory and closure relations that he introduced as a way to develop physically based hydrologic models of appropriate complexity and fidelity over what he called the representative elementary watershed (REW) scale. In parallel, he and students Chatchai Jothityangkoon and Darren Farmer proposed an alternative top-down, data-based methodology for the systematic development of models of appropriate complexity by focusing on reproducing signatures of hydrologic variability over a range of timescales.

Recognizing the considerable uncertainty in hydrological predictions due to the inability to estimate transpiration by natural vegetation realistically, Sivapalan improved the research approach through interdisciplinary synthesis. He and his PhD student Stan Schymanski proposed and tested the principle of vegetation optimality, and in particular the maximization of net carbon profit, as a way to make prediction of evapotranspiration and water balance with minimal calibration.

Around 2001, Sivapalan turned his attention to the problem of Predictions in Ungauged Basins (PUB). He introduced the idea of PUB to the International Association of Hydrological Sciences (IAHS), which launched PUB as a global, decadal (2003–2012) initiative, with Sivapalan as the founding chair. Sivapalan wrote the PUB science plan, organized several workshops and conferences, and traveled around the world to promote it and mobilize the community. Apart from its practical value, Sivapalan saw PUB as providing the basis for advancing a unified theoretical basis for catchment hydrology. The culmination of PUB was the publication of the landmark synthesis book Runoff Predictions in Ungauged Basins (Blöschl et al., 2013) by Cambridge University Press, in which Sivapalan served as an editor.

=== Phase 3. Extrapolation Across Time: Predictions under Change and Socio-hydrology ===
From about 2010, Sivapalan turned his attention to the problem of predictions under change, especially human-induced changes to the hydrologic systems. Through a series of meetings, he brought the hydrologic community together to develop a forward-looking agenda to deal with predictions under change. In 2011 he and his colleagues launched the sub-field of socio-hydrology as a science that deals with the two-way feedback between humans and water. Socio-hydrology presents a coevolutionary view of hydrologic systems and explores the relationship between water, human activities, landscapes, and climate. The launch of socio-hydrology coincided with the launch of the Panta Rhei: Change in Hydrology and Society, another global, decadal (2013–22) initiative of the International Association of Hydrological Sciences in which once again Sivapalan played a leading role. He traveled around the world, establishing international collaborations in Australia, China, and Europe, and promoting socio-hydrologic thinking. For his contributions to socio-hydrology and his leadership in promoting the field around the world he was awarded the Prince Sultan Bin Abdulaziz International Prize for Water (PSIPW) (Creativity Prize).

== Awards and honors ==
Sivapalan's research contributions have been recognized through multiple awards from national and international scientific organizations and academies. These include:

- Life Member, The International Water Academy, Oslo, Norway (2001)
- Fellow, Australian Academy of Technological Sciences and Engineering (2001)
- Fellow: American Geophysical Union (AGU) (2003)
- John Dalton Medal: European Geosciences Union (2003)
- Centenary Medal: Commonwealth Government of Australia (2003)
- International Hydrology Prize (IHP): International Association of Hydrological Sciences (IAHS)/World Meteorological Organization (WMO)/UNESCO (2010)
- Hydrological Sciences Award (HSA): American Geophysical Union (AGU) (2010)
- Robert E. Horton Medal: American Geophysical Union (2011)
- Doctor (Honoris Causa): Delft University of Technology, The Netherlands (2012)
- Chester and Helen Siess Endowed Professor: University of Illinois at Urbana-Champaign (2014-current)
- Alfred Wegener Medal and Honorary Membership: European Geosciences Union (EGU) (2017)
- Prince Sultan Bin Abdulaziz International Prize for Water (Creativity Prize) (2018)
- Fellow of the American Association for the Advancement of Science (2021)
- Tau Beta Pi Daniel C Drucker Eminent Faculty Award, UIUC College of Engineering (2022)

In honor of Sivapalan's contributions to the development of hydrologic science the International Association of Hydrological Sciences (IAHS) established the Sivapalan Young Scientists Travel Award (SYSTA) in 2018.

== Publications ==
Sivapalan has published more than 300 peer-reviewed papers and several research monographs. His publications are highly cited: for example, 42,800 citations with an H-index of 104 and an I10-index of 294 in Google Scholar. His publications cover a wide range of topics, including the effects of heterogeneity, scale, flood frequency, water balance, water quality modeling, and socio-hydrology. The most cited articles include research on scale issues in hydrological modeling with prediction in ungauged basins and socio-hydrology.

== Leadership and Service ==
Sivapalan was founding chair of the International Association of Hydrological Sciences' Decade on Predictions in Ungauged Basins initiative, through which he mobilized the international community at the grassroots level to undertake fundamental research addressing this major scientific challenge in catchment hydrology.

Sivapalan has served at various times on the editorial boards of almost all international hydrology journals, including Hydrological Processes, Hydrological Sciences Journal, Advances in Water Resources, Journal of Hydrology and Water Resources Research. He was executive editor of the European Geosciences Union's Hydrology and Earth System Sciences Journal, following its transition to open access.
