= Gladys Block =

American nutritionist

Gladys Block is a nutrition researcher who worked at the National Cancer Institute.

== Education and career ==
From July 1991 onward, Block worked at the University of California, Berkeley as a professor (and subsequently professor emerita) of Community Health and Human Development in the School of Public Health.

In 1993 she founded NutritionQuest which produces assessments of diet and physical activity for researchers.

== Block FFQ ==
During her time at the National Cancer Institute (1982 to 1991), Block developed a semi-quantitative food frequency questionnaire (FFQ) that would later come to be known as the Block FFQ. The approach to questionnaire design was first described in a paper co-authored with Hartman, Dresser, Carroll, Gannon, and Gardner in 1986. Research by Block, Potosky, and Clifford on validation of the questionnaire was published in 1990.

After leaving the National Cancer Institute in 1991, Block continued to work on the FFQ, offering it through the company, NutritionQuest, that she founded in 1993. Subsequent released versions include the Block 95 and Block 98 FFQs. A web version was also released and validated.

The Block FFQ has been used in third-party research and has also been the subject of validation and comparison studies.

The Block FFQ is the earliest of the currently widely used FFQs in the United States. Other semi-quantitative FFQs include the Diet History Questionnaire (DHQ) and NHANES (also developed at the National Cancer Institute) and the Harvard FFQ, developed by a team at Harvard University led by Walter Willett.

== Work ==
=== Vitamins ===
In 1992, Block's review of 15 epidemiological studies on cancer rates and intake of Vitamin C was mentioned in the New York Times.

Block has been cited in media coverage of the debate around the efficacy of dietary multivitamin supplements in combating health risks including the risk of cancer, obesity, diabetes, heart disease, and hypertension. Others taking a similar position as Block (in favor of dietary supplements) include Harvard professor Walter Willett (designer of the Harvard FFQ), researcher Bruce N. Ames, and Michael Jacobson of the Center for Science in the Public Interest. Those on the other side include Marion Nestle, Joan Gussow, Catherine Wotecki, Walter Mertz, and Edgar Miller.

=== Variety in diet ===
Block has led research on the variety in people's diet and its effects on people's nutrient consumption and health status. She has been cited on the subject in the New York Times.

=== Alive! ===
Block has developed a program called ALIVE that people can use to improve their diet and physical activity. The program and its spinoff, ALIVE-PD (to help prediabetics prevent diabetes) are currently offered through Turnaround Health, a division of NutritionQuest.
