= Tamil Times =

1981–2006 British news magazine

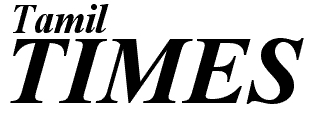
- Categories: News
- Frequency: Monthly
- Format: paper size
- Founder: N. S. Kandiah, S. Navaratnam, P. Ragunathan, P. Rajanayagam, C. J. T. Thamotheram and R. Thayaparan
- First issue: October 1981
- Final issue Number: December 2006; Volume XXV Issue 12
- Company: Tamil Times Limited
- Country: United Kingdom
- Based in: Sutton
- ISSN: 0266-4488
- OCLC: 13999855

The Tamil Times was an English language British monthly news magazine focusing on Sri Lankan Tamil issues. Founded in 1981, the magazine was published from Sutton and distributed worldwide to the Sri Lankan Tamil diaspora. It ceased publication in 2006.

== History ==
The Tamil Times was founded in 1981 by N. S. Kandiah, S. Navaratnam, P. Ragunathan, P. Rajanayagam, C. J. T. Thamotheram and R. Thayaparan. Thamotheram was managing director of the magazine as well as its editor. The first edition of the paper was published in October 1981. The magazine's publisher, Tamil Times Limited, was incorporated on 10 November 1981. The magazine was later edited by Rajanayagam.

Developments in Sri Lanka led to divergent perspectives among the magazine's editors, with some supporting militant Tamil nationalism while others like the main editor P. Rajanayagam were critical of it. By 1987, Rajanayagam’s perspective had won, following the resignation of C. J. T. Thamotheram over disagreements. Rajanayagam continued as the editor until January 2006. Rajanayagam’s editorials were read with interest by various representatives of governments, members of the human rights groups, journalists and academics.

In its early years the Tamil Times became a crucial source of news about the Sri Lankan Civil War for the growing Sri Lankan Tamil diaspora, particularly as the Sri Lankan government heavily censored local media outlets. The Sri Lankan government published the free-circulation Sri Lankan Times to compete with the Tamil Times.

In the 1990s new news outlets started appearing among the diaspora community. Many of these were controlled or influenced by the militant Liberation Tigers of Tamil Eelam (LTTE) which had a strong presence among the diaspora. The Tamil Times however maintained its independence. The August 1999 issue of Tamil Times was devoted entirely to the assassination of Neelan Tiruchelvam, widely blamed on the LTTE.

With falling circulation the Tamil Times ceased publication in late 2006. Tamil Times Limited was dissolved on 13 August 2008.
