= Rudra Rajasingham =

Sri Lankan police officer and diplomat

- Born: 2 April 1926
- Died: 24 March 2006 (aged 79); Colombo
- Education: Hartley College; C.M.S. Ladies' College, Colombo; Trinity College, Kandy; University of Ceylon
- Police career
- Allegiance: Sri Lanka
- Department: Sri Lanka Police Service
- Rank: Inspector General of Police
- Other work: Sri Lankan Ambassador to Indonesia

Rudra Srichandra Rajasingham (2 April 1926 – 24 March 2006) was a Sri Lankan police officer and diplomat. He was the Inspector General of Police and Sri Lankan Ambassador to Indonesia.

== Early life and family ==
Rajasingham was born on 2 April 1926. He was the son of surgeon A. S. Rajasingham and Noble Rajasingham. He was educated at Hartley College, C.M.S. Ladies' College, Colombo and Trinity College, Kandy. He was a school prefect and member of the cricket and rugby teams at Trinity College. After school he joined the University of Ceylon, Colombo from where he graduated with a degree in English, History and Economics. He played cricket and rugby for the university too.

Rajasingham married Sita. They had a daughter (Sharminie).

== Career ==
Rajasingham joined the Ceylon Police Force in 1949 as a probationary Assistant Superintendent of Police. He worked at several police stations including Tangalle, Mannar and Colombo. He rose up the ranks and in 1982 he was appointed Inspector General of Police, the most senior police officer post in the country. He was a Sri Lankan representative at the Thimpu peace talks with Sri Lankan Tamil militant groups in 1985.

Rajasingham was head of the Police Sports Club and its rugby section. He also played for Ceylonese Rugby & Football Club, served as its president in 1971 and made life member in 1974.

== Later life ==
After retirement Rajasingham was appointed Sri Lankan Ambassador to Indonesia in 1985. He was later chairman of the State Mortgage Bank and a member of the first Commission to Investigate Allegations Bribery and Corruption.

Rajasingham was president of Sri Lanka Rugby Football Union between 1993 and 1994.

Rajasingham died on 24 March 2006 at the Police Hospital in Colombo.
