= C. J. T. Thamotheram =

- சி. ஜே. டி. தாமோதரம்
- Born: 19 September 1918; Thunnalai, Ceylon
- Died: 27 October 2005 (aged 87)
- Other name: Jayam Thamotheram
- Education: Ceylon University College
- Occupation: Teacher

Charles Jayam Thambyrajah Thamotheram (19 September 1918 – 27 October 2005) was a Sri Lankan Tamil teacher, publisher and social worker.

== Early life and family ==
Thamotheram was born on 19 September 1918 in Thunnalai in northern Ceylon. (Note: Another source gives Thamotheram's birth date as 19 September 1919.) He was the son of C. P. Thamotheram, principal of Hartley College, and Huldah Thangamma Arulampalam. He was educated at St. John's College, Jaffna, Hartley College and St. Joseph's College, Colombo. He then joined Ceylon University College, graduating with a second class honours degree in science. (Note: Another source says he received a first class honours degree in mathematics.)

Thamotheram married Florence Thiviamalar (Malar), daughter of Rev. N. K. Nalliah, in 1944. They had three sons (Vijay, Priya, and Raj) and three daughters (Sunetra, Thiru and Shantini). Thamotheram was a practising Methodist.

== Career ==
In 1939, at the age of 20, Thamotheram was appointed as a school master at Hartley College. He then left teaching in 1942 and worked for the Ceylon Government Supplies Department before working in the private sector. He then returned to teaching a couple of years later, joining St. Patrick's College, Jaffna before proceeding to Wesley College, Colombo two years later to teach mathematics. Thamotheram then received the Smith-Mundt scholarship to study in the USA. (Note: Another source says he received a Fulbright scholarship to study at the University of Pennsylvania.) After a year, he returned to Wesley College but when the post of principal became vacant, Thamotheram should have been appointed but the discriminatory policies prevalent in Ceylon at that time meant he was ignored. He resigned from Wesley College in 1959 and joined the British Council in Colombo as a First Administrative Assistant.

Thamotheram founded the Colombo Teachers' Association and served as its first president (1954/55). He also founded the Ceylon Teachers' Travel Club which organised tours to Australia, China, India, Israel, UK and USSR. He emigrated to the UK in 1961 and taught at grammar school in Luton for a few years before joining the independent Latymer Upper School in 1965. He retired from Latymer in 1983.

Thamotheram founded the Association of Commonwealth Teachers in 1966. He was also very active amongst the Sri Lankan Tamil diaspora in the UK. He was founder and vice-president of the Standing Committee of Tamils (SCOT) in 1977. He was the founder and headmaster of the UK's first Tamil school, the West London Tamil School in Greenford, from 1978 to 1982. He, along with others, founded the Tamil Times magazine in 1981. Thamotheram was managing director, editor and circulation manager of the magazine. He resigned from magazine's board in 1987. In 1988 he founded the International Tamil Foundation and served as its president. Thamotheram and International Tamil Foundation opposed LTTE's proscription as a terrorist group in the United Kingdom. He also founded the League of Friends of the Jaffna University and the Tamil Writers' Guild.

Thamotheram died on 27 October 2005.
