= A. Gnanathasan =

Sri Lankan Tamil lawyer

A. Gnanathasan PC
- Born: Chavakachcheri
- Education: Drieberg College; Hartley College; Jaffna College; Sri Lanka Law College; University of the West Indies
- Occupation: Lawyer

Aiyathurai Gnanathasan is a leading Sri Lankan Tamil lawyer, President's Counsel and Additional Solicitor General.

== Early life and family ==
Gnanathasan was born in Chavakachcheri in northern Ceylon. He is the son of V. N. Aiyathurai, Deputy Principal of Drieberg College, and P. Aiyathurai, a teacher at Drieberg College. He was educated at the Drieberg College, Hartley College and Jaffna College. After school he joined the Sri Lanka Law College, qualifying as an attorney-at-law. At the college he won the "Sir Ponnambalam Ramanathan Gold Medal for the Address to the Jury" in 1978 and 1979.

== Career ==
After being called to bar in 1980, Gnanathasan started practising law in the chambers of President's Counsel A. Mahendrarajah. He worked for the Sivanathan and Associates law firm. Later he joined the Attorney-General's Department as a State Counsel. He served as prosecutor in all of Sri Lanka's High Courts and worked on the famous "Palavi murder" case in Jaffna and "Ampara beauty queen case" in Batticaloa.

Gnanathasan qualified as solicitor in the United Kingdom on 1 July 1992 and worked for the Rajah and Company law firm. He was admitted as a practitioner (barrister and solicitor) of the Supreme Court of Tasmania on 11 April 1994. He was admitted as a solicitor of the Supreme Court of New South Wales on 2 May 1994.

Back in Sri Lanka, Gnanathasan became Senior State Counsel in 1995, Deputy Solicitor General on 14 July 1999 and Additional Solicitor General 30 April 2008.

Gnanathasan was a visiting lecturer in criminal law at the Sri Lanka Law College between 1995 and 2007 and served as chairman of the Board of Examiners (Preliminary) at the college. He completed the Master of Laws degree from the University of the West Indies in 1998 after receiving a Commonwealth Scholarship. He has been a visiting lecturer and examiner at the Faculty of Law, University of Colombo since 2003. He was appointed President's Counsel on 9 March 2009.

Gnanathasan joined the Board of Directors of Jaffna College in 2000 and served as its chairman between 2002 and 2006. He has been vice-chairman of Jaffna College Old Boys’ Association (Colombo Branch) since 2000 and he was vice-president of the Hartley College Past Pupils’ Association between 1999 and 2007.
