= 24-hour diet recall =

Dietary assessment tool

A 24-hour diet recall is a dietary assessment tool that consists of a structured interview in which participants are asked to recall all food and drink they have consumed in the previous 24 hours. It may be self-administered.

== Description ==
The 24-hour diet recall relies on a trained interviewer, an accurate memory of intake, an ability to estimate portion size, and the interviewee's reliability to not misreport. This method can be administered by telephone, is suitable for large surveys, and has a low burden for respondents. In the interview, participants are asked to describe the foods and drinks they have consumed in the previous 24 hours; the participant then might be asked to provide more detail than what was initially provided. The open-ended nature of the interview is intended to help produce the most detailed description of foods and drinks consumed over the previous 24 hours. Details might include time of day, source of food, and portion size of food. A 24-hour diet recall is typically completed in 20–60 minutes. The 24-hour diet recall is most accurate when administered more than once for each individual.

24-hour diet recall is more interactive than other techniques and so provides a way for the interviewer and interviewee to interact during the recall. The interviewer may use various props, such as a deck of cards, to indicate a weight amount for the foods and drinks consumed; however, the props might not be appropriate in cross-cultural settings. The interviewer might also use different techniques to jog memory including working chronologically, or asking the interviewee to recall all of their activities during the previous day, or asking other probing questions in an effort to make sure the interviewee remembers as much as possible. The interviewer might ask the respondent to remember eating and drinking by time period or linking them to day time activities.

== Data ==
Data from a 24-hour diet recall can include:

- The total amount consumed of each specific food and beverage
- The total amount consumed of each group of similar foods or beverages
- The nutrient intake from food and beverage
- Meal and snack patterns, consumption of food either home or away from home, and other contextual information
- A population's mean usual intake
- A group's usual dietary intake distributions
- Relationships between diet and health, or other variables
- The effectiveness of an intervention study to change diet

== Uses ==
24-hour diet recalls are used by medical professionals, nutrition specialists, and social scientists. Nutritional information for these recalls are best analysed using computer-based nutritional assessment programs.

A 2013 study determined that the 24-hour multiple-pass recall is a sufficient method for assessing dietary intake of toddlers of Iraqi or Somali born mothers in Norway.

Correlation between 24-hour diet recalls and food frequency questionnaires has been estimated to be 0.60–0.70. Additionally, 24-hour diet recalls measure intake with less bias than food frequency questionnaires.

== Limitations ==
Since the results of a 24-hour diet recall are not representative, it is not a good stand-alone method and should be utilized with other methods, such as food frequency questionnaires. A 24-hour diet recall cannot account for day-to-day variation, and so should be administered multiple times to be useful. The method has also been criticized due to the administrator and participant variation that it can cause. As the recall is memory dependent, there may also be bias in respondents over or under reporting good/bad foods, or poorly estimating portion sizes. The 24-hour diet recall is affected by reactivity. The 24-hour diet recall is a poor method for measuring intake for food or drink with a high day-to-day variability. The 24-hour diet recall is unsuitable for large scale studies due to its time, literacy, and economic constraints. 24-hour diet recalls are used less frequently in pregnant women.

== See also ==
- Food frequency questionnaire
