= K. Alvapillai =

Ceylon Tamil civil servant

K. Alvapillai OBE
- Born: 23 November 1905
- Died: 17 February 1979 (aged 73)
- Education: Hartley College; Ceylon University College; University of London
- Occupation: Civil servant

Kovindapillai Alvapillai, OBE (23 November 1905 – 17 February 1979) was a leading Ceylon Tamil civil servant.

== Early life ==
Alvapillai was born on 23 November 1905. He was the son of Kovindapillai and Seethevi Pillai (Thangam) from Thumpalai near Point Pedro in northern British Ceylon. Alvapillai had an elder sister (Nagaratnam), younger brother (Sathasivam Pillai) and younger sister (Theva Yogam). His father died when Alvapillai was ten years old. He was educated at Hartley College, Point Pedro. He passed the Senior Cambridge examination with distinction and honours. He then went to Ceylon University College. After graduation he went to the University of London from where he graduated with a first class honours degree in mathematics.

Alvapillai married Kanagammah, daughter of V. Nallathamby and Vallipillai from Tellippalai. They had two sons (Vijayaraghavan and Senthilkumar) and a daughter (Bhavani).

Alvapillai was the President of the Colombo Vivekananda Society and Colombo Tamil Sangam and one of the founders of Colombo Hindu College.

== Career ==
On returning to Ceylon Alvapillai joined the Ceylon Civil Service in 1929 as a cadet. He was appointed Deputy Commissioner of Food Purchase in 1942. In 1945 he was appointed Director of Food Supplies. Later he became Food Commissioner. In 1953 he was appointed Permanent Secretary to the Minister of Agriculture and Food. In 1959 he became Permanent Secretary to the Minister of Commerce and Trade. During his career Alvapillai worked for some of the leading ministers in post-independence Ceylon: Oliver Goonetilleke, Philip Gunawardena, T. B. Ilangaratne, J. R. Jayewardene, A. Ratnayaka, Maithripala Senanayake and V. A. Sugathadasa. He retired in 1965.

In the 1948 Birthday Honours Alvapillai was made an Officer of the Order of the British Empire.

After retirement Alvapillai served as Chairman of a number of state-owned corporations – Ceylon Petroleum Corporation, Ceylon State Flour Corporation and Ceylon Shipping Corporation.

== Death ==
Alvapillai died on 17 February 1979 aged 73.
