= Chavakachcheri Hospital =

- Ministry of Health, Northern Province
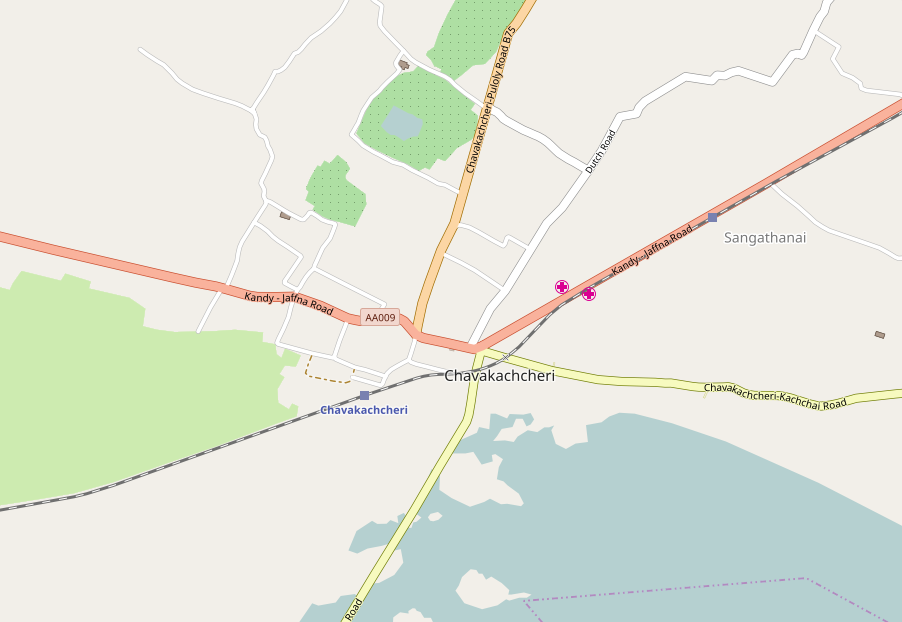
- Location in Chavakachcheri

Geography
- Location: Chavakachcheri, Jaffna District, Northern Province, Sri Lanka
- Coordinates: 9°39′43.80″N 80°09′59.50″E

Organisation
- Care system: Public

Services
- Emergency department: Yes
- Beds: 111

Links
- Lists: Hospitals in Sri Lanka

Chavakachcheri Hospital is a government hospital in Chavakachcheri, Sri Lanka. It is controlled by the provincial government in Jaffna. As of 2010 it had 111 beds. The hospital is sometimes called Chavakachcheri Base Hospital or Chavakachcheri District Hospital.

As well as general medical and surgical care the hospital provides a wide variety of healthcare services including diabetic, dentistry, obstetrics (ante-natal), oncology, ophthalmology, paediatrics, psychiatry and tuberculosis. The hospital also has an emergency department, an x-ray unit and a pathological laboratory.

In 2010 the hospital had 9,822 in-patient admissions, 125,003 out-patient visits and 20,352 clinic visits.
