= Tamil Germans =

Tamil German
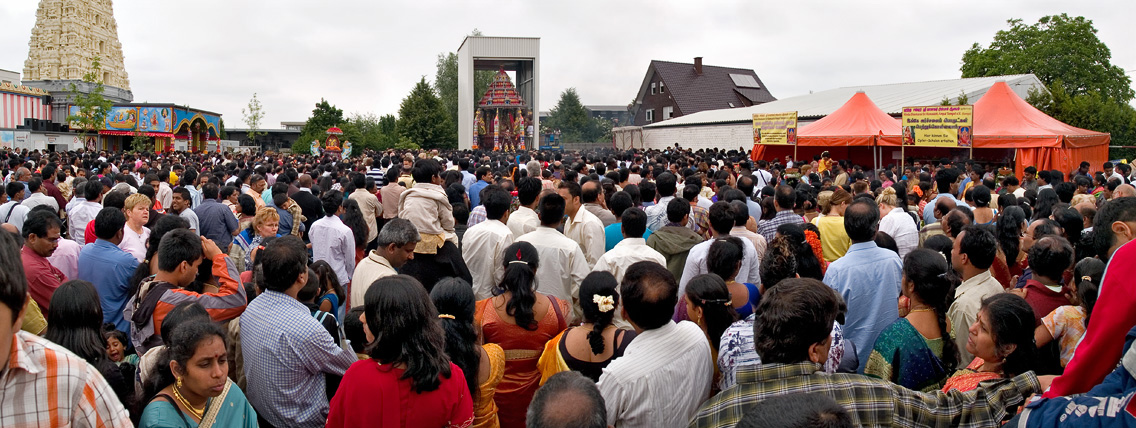
- Tamil pilgrims gathered outside the Kamadchi Amman Temple in Hamm, for a temple festival in 2007.

Total population
- 80,000

Languages
- Tamil, German, English

Religion
- Hinduism, Christianity, Islam

Tamil German or German Tamizhar refer to the German citizens of Tamil ethnic origins mainly from India in Tamil Nadu and Puducherry then Sri Lanka and Malaysia apart from other parts of the world. Tamil migration to Germany which was mainly composed of higher education and labor migrants increased in the late 1980s and onwards mainly due to the escalation of the Sri Lankan Civil War which saw tens of thousands of those belonging to the Tamil community fleeing the country and seeking asylum elsewhere abroad. The Tamil population figures in Germany currently range somewhere between 50,000-60,000. Karin Stoll is the consul general at the German Consulate in Chennai.

== Religion ==
It is found that most Tamils, irrespective of their Indian and Sri Lankan origins all tended to practice Hinduism and especially Shaivism. There are two well organized Hindu temples in the country – Sidhivinayagar Kovil and the Kamatchi Amman Kovil – both in the western city of Hamm since 1984.

The Kamatchi Amman Temple attracts some 15,000 visitors and has become a central pilgrimage place for Tamil Hindus all over Europe.

Additionally, since the late 1980s, Tamil Hindus founded numerous temples, numbering about 25 places of worship in early 2005. The temples are situated in cellars and flats, some in former warehouses and industrial halls. Apart from their religious importance for the carrying out of religious worship, life-cycle rituals and festivals, some of the temples also function as socio-cultural meeting points. A few temples have started to celebrate the annual temple festival with a public procession, thus bringing the gods and Hindu tradition to wider notice.

== Notable people ==
- Ian Karan, businessman a.k.a. "Container King"
- Majoe, birthname: Mayjuran Ragunathan, german rapper
- Thulasi Tharumalingam, professional boxer and participant of Olympics 2016 in Rio De Janeiro, Brazil

== See also ==
- Tamil Diaspora
- Germans in India
