= Mallavi Hospital =

- Ministry of Health, Northern Province

Geography
- Location: Mallavi, Mullaitivu District, Northern Province, Sri Lanka
- Coordinates: 9°08′05.10″N 80°18′31.30″E

Organisation
- Care system: Public

Services
- Beds: 144

Links
- Lists: Hospitals in Sri Lanka

Mallavi Hospital is a government hospital in Mallavi, Sri Lanka. It is controlled by the provincial government in Jaffna. As of 2010 it had 144 beds. The hospital is sometimes called Mallavi Peripheral Unit or Mallavi District Hospital.
