= Kayts Hospital =

- Ministry of Health, Northern Province

Geography
- Location: Kayts, Jaffna District, Northern Province, Sri Lanka
- Coordinates: 9°41′36.20″N 79°52′05.30″E

Organisation
- Care system: Public

Services
- Emergency department: Yes
- Beds: 59

Links
- Lists: Hospitals in Sri Lanka

Kayts Hospital is a government hospital in Kayts, Sri Lanka. It is controlled by the provincial government in Jaffna. As of 2010 it had 59 beds. The hospital is sometimes called Kayts Base Hospital or Kayts District Hospital.

As well as general medical care the hospital provides a wide variety of healthcare services including diabetic, dentistry, family planning, obstetrics (ante-natal). The hospital also has an emergency department and a pathological laboratory.

In 2010 the hospital had 2,963 in-patient admissions, 35,383 out-patient visits and 8,328 clinic visits.
