= Mullaitivu Hospital =

- Ministry of Health, Northern Province

Geography
- Location: Mullaitivu, Mullaitivu District, Northern Province, Sri Lanka

Organisation
- Care system: Public

Services
- Beds: 256

Links
- Lists: Hospitals in Sri Lanka

Mullaitivu Hospital is a government hospital in Mullaitivu, Sri Lanka. It is the leading hospital in Mullaitivu District and is controlled by the provincial government in Jaffna. As of 2010 it had 256 beds. The hospital is sometimes called Mullaitivu District General Hospital or Mullaitivu District Hospital.

This hospital has had a troubled past. It was once very overcrowded, according to information from Parliamentary debates in 1961.

When the 26 December 2004, tsunami hit the area, this hospital had 30 beds. The hospital was 2 kilometres (1.2 mi) from the coast and was completely surrounded by water for a time. After the tsunami hit, a number of nurses and staff had lost their homes and had to sleep in hospital offices or in tents some distance from the hospital. The Red Cross helped repair the hospital and provided tents to serve as temporary shelter for hospital staff. The tents were set up adjacent to the hospital.

The hospital suffered further damage during the Sri Lankan Civil War. On 15, 19 and 20 December 2008, shelling by Sri Lankan artillery hit the hospital and hospital grounds. Two patients and two staff were wounded and some damage to the hospital and medical equipment also resulted. In January 2009 on three separate days the hospital and its grounds were shelled and five people were killed and twenty-eight were wounded.

The Indian government in 2012 provided LKR 89 million (USD 700,000) worth of equipment to the Mullaitivu District General Hospital. A newer 150-bed General Hospital, apparently replacing the old facility, was opened by Indian efforts. Adjacent to that hospital, India began construction of another 100-bed hospital.
