= Kilinochchi Hospital =

- Ministry of Health, Northern Province
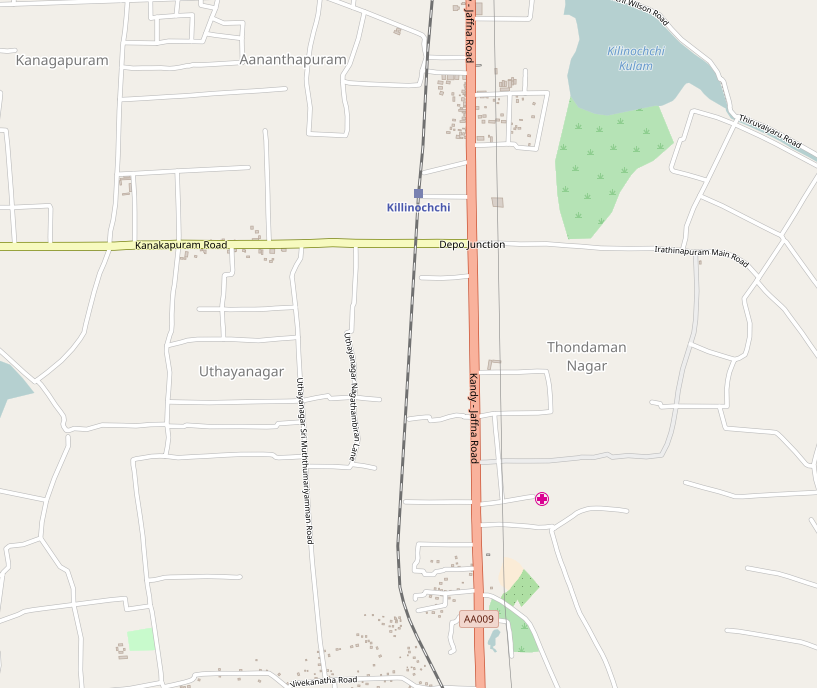
- Location in central Kilinochchi

Geography
- Location: Kilinochchi, Kilinochchi District, Northern Province, Sri Lanka
- Coordinates: 9°22′22.00″N 80°24′42.00″E

Organisation
- Care system: Public

Services
- Beds: 110

Links
- Lists: Hospitals in Sri Lanka

Kilinochchi General Hospital is a government hospital in Kilinochchi, Sri Lanka. It is the leading hospital in Kilinochchi District and is managed by the health ministry northern provincial government. As of 2010 it had 110 beds. The hospital is sometimes called Kilinochchi District General Hospital.
