= Mannar Hospital =

- Ministry of Health, Northern Province
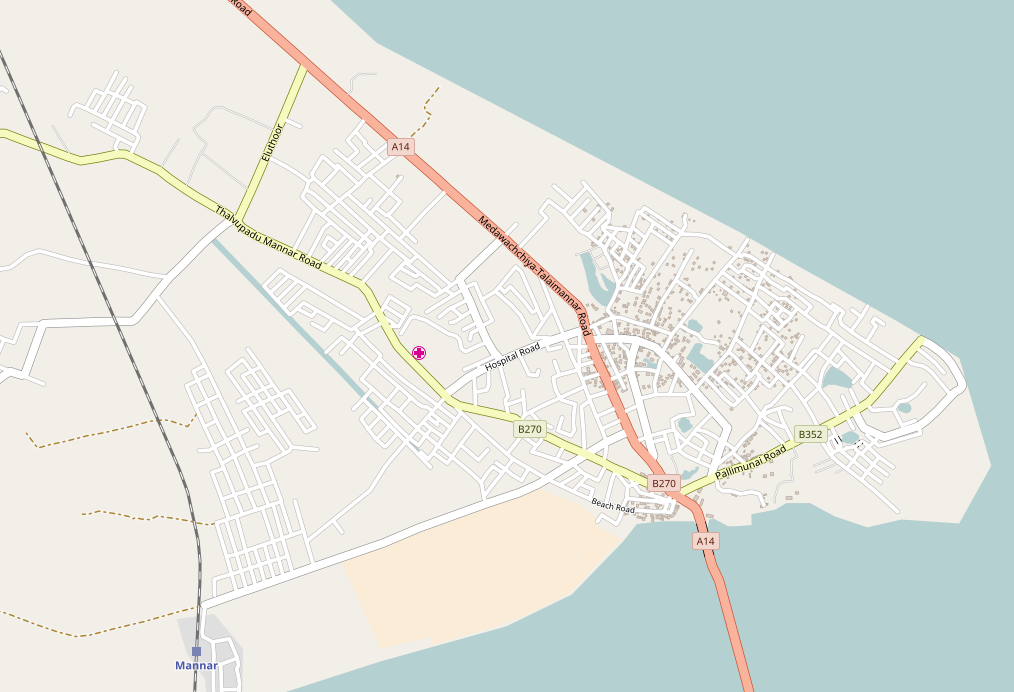
- Location in Mannar

Geography
- Location: Mannar, Mannar District, Northern Province, Sri Lanka
- Coordinates: 8°58′57.50″N 79°54′12.90″E

Organisation
- Care system: Public

Services
- Beds: 350

Links
- Lists: Hospitals in Sri Lanka

Mannar Hospital is a government hospital in Mannar, Sri Lanka. It is the leading hospital in Mannar District and is controlled by the provincial government in Jaffna. As of 2010 it had 350 beds. The hospital is sometimes called Mannar District General Hospital or Mannar Base Hospital.
