= USDA National Nutrient Database =

US government nutritional database

The USDA National Nutrient Database for Standard Reference (renamed in 2019 to FoodData Central) is a database produced by the United States Department of Agriculture that provides the nutritional content of many generic and proprietary-branded foods. Released in August 2015 and revised every two years, the database contains data on several thousand foods and dozens of components in foods, including macronutrients and micronutrients. New releases occur every two years. The database may be searched online, queried through a representational state transfer API, or downloaded.

FoodData Central includes five data types: Foundation Foods, Experimental Foods, Legacy Foods ("SR Legacy"), Food and Nutrient Database for Dietary Studies 2021-2023 (FNDDS 2021-2023), and the USDA Global Branded Food Products Database (Branded Foods).

== FoodData Central ==
FoodData Central is USDA's integrated data system that contains five types of data containing information on food and nutrient profiles:

- Standard Reference, using earlier approaches to determining nutrient profiles of foods in the marketplace, provides a comprehensive list of values for nutrients and food components that are derived from calculations and analyses.
- Foundation Foods includes nutrient values as well as extensive underlying metadata on commercially available foods.
- Experimental Foods currently links to relevant agricultural research data from multiple sources, such as the Agricultural Collaborative Research Outcomes System (AgCROS).
- Food and Nutrient Database for Dietary Studies (FNDDS) provides nutrient values for the foods and beverages reported in What We Eat in America, the dietary intake component of the National Health and Nutrition Examination Survey (NHANES).
- The USDA Global Branded Food Products Database contains nutrient data that appear on branded and private label foods provided by the food industry, from ILSI, GS1 US, 1WorldSync, Label Insight, and University of Maryland's Joint Institute for Food Safety and Applied Nutrition.
