= Socio-hydrology =

Interdisciplinary field studying the dynamic interactions between water and people

Socio-hydrology; socio (from the Latin word socius, meaning 'companion) and hydrology (from the Greek: ὕδωρ, "hýdōr" meaning "water"; and λόγος, "lógos" meaning "study") is an interdisciplinary field studying the dynamic interactions and feedbacks between water and people. Areas of research in socio-hydrology include the historical study of the interplay between hydrological and social processes, comparative analysis of the co-evolution and self-organization of human and water systems in different cultures, and process-based modelling of coupled human-water systems. The first approach to socio-hydrology was the term "hydro-sociology", which arises from a concern about the scale of impact of human activities on the hydrological cycle. Socio-hydrology is defined as the humans-water interaction and later as "the science of people and water", which introduces bidirectional feedbacks between human–water systems, differentiating it from other related disciplines that deal with water. Furthermore, socio-hydrology has been presented as one of the most relevant challenges for the Anthropocene, in relationship with its aims at unraveling dynamic cross-scale interactions and feedbacks between natural and human processes that give rise to many water sustainability challenges. Socio‐hydrology is also predicted to be an important license for modellers.

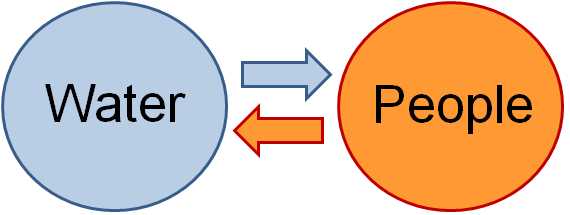
Socio-Hydrology: Interplay between social and hydrological processes

== Overview ==
In traditional hydrology, human activities are typically described as boundary conditions, or external forcings, to the water systems (scenario-based approach). This traditional approach tends to make long term predictions unrealistic as interactions and bi-directional feedbacks between human and water systems cannot be captured.

Following the increased hydrological challenges due to human-induced changes, hydrologists started to overcome the limitation of traditional hydrology by accounting for the mutual interactions between water and society and by advocating for greater connection between social science and hydrology.

Socio-hydrologists argue that water and human systems change interdependently as well as in connection with each other and that their mutual reshaping continues and evolves over time. On the one hand, society importantly alters the hydrological regime. It modifies the frequency and severity of floods and droughts through continuous water abstraction, dams and reservoirs construction, flood protection measures, urbanization, etc. In turn, modified water regimes and hydrological extremes shape societies which respond and adapt spontaneously or through collective strategies.

In general, to explain the co-evolution of human and water systems, socio-hydrology should draw on different disciplines and include historical studies, comparative analysis and process based modeling. Most of the socio-hydrological efforts to date have focused on investigating recurring social behavior and societal development resulting from their coevolution with hydrological systems. The majority of these studies have explained coupled human and water systems through quantitative approaches and dedicated efforts to capture human-water interactions and feedback through mathematical model, mostly as non-linear differential equations.

Critics to socio-hydrology argue that the field does not add sufficient novelty to justify the creation of an entire new discipline. In particular, critics highlight the overlap with several areas of the study of coupled human and natural systems (CHANS) and of integrated water resource management.

== The case of dams and reservoirs ==
Building dams and reservoirs is one of the most common approaches to cope with drought and water shortage. The aim is straightforward: reservoirs can store water during wet periods, and then release it during dry periods. As such, they can stabilise water availability, thereby satisfying water demand and alleviating water shortage. However, increasing reservoir storage capacity can also lead to unintended effects in the long term, and, paradoxically, worsen water scarcity.

=== The supply-demand cycle ===
Supply-demand cycle: water shortage

Evidence has shown that water supply leads to higher water demand, which can quickly offset the initial benefits of reservoirs. These cycles can be seen as a rebound effect, also known in environmental economics as Jevon's paradox: as more water is available, water consumption tends to increase. This can result in a vicious cycle: a new water shortage can be addressed by further expansion of reservoir storage to increase water availability, which enables more water consumption, which then can potentially lead to conditions of water scarcity. As such, the supply-demand cycle can trigger an accelerating spiral towards unsustainable exploitation of water resources and environmental degradation.

=== The reservoir effect ===
Over-reliance on reservoirs can increase the potential damage caused by drought and water shortage. The expansion of reservoirs often reduces incentives for individuals preparedness and adaptive actions, thus increasing the negative impacts of water shortage. Moreover, extended periods of abundant water supply, supported by reservoirs, can generate higher dependence on water resources, which in turn increases social vulnerability and economic damage when water shortage eventually occurs.

Attempts to increase water supply to cope with growing water demand, which is fuelled by the increase in supply, has been shown to be unsustainable. Drought occurrences can trigger temporary reductions of water availability, often leading to water shortage when water demand cannot be satisfied by the available water.

=== Examples of reservoir effects and supply-demand cycles ===
In Athens, the Mornos Reservoir overflow of 1985 lead to a new law in 1987 which declared water as a "natural gift" and "undeniable right" for every citizen. Two years later, a severe drought occurred the system was pushed to its limits and government responses were slow due to lack of conservation measures undertaken.

Lake Mead was built in the 1930s to provide water to California, Arizona and Nevada. At that time, Las Vegas was projected to grow up to 400,000 inhabitants by the end of the century. Yet, the population of Las Vegas grew much faster than what was expected and it was about four times more than expected by the end of the century. This unexpected population growth was enabled by increased water supply secured by more and more in-take structure from Lake Mead. In the 2000s, in response to severe droughts, the city got close to water shortage and as a result, yet another water in-take structure was constructed.

In Melbourne, in response to severe droughts in the 80's, water supply was increased. Yet, these increases in water capacity have been shown to only prevent water shortage during minor droughts. The increase in human water use in Melbourne in fact doubled the severity of streamflows during the Millennium Drought and also had the effect of making the area more vulnerable to prolonged droughts due to increase dependency on reservoirs.

An earlier example is within the Maya civilisation. Here, additional storage of water initially brought many benefits and allowed agricultural growth under normal and minor drought conditions. Yet, this also created increased reliance on water resources which made the population more vulnerable to extreme drought conditions, and might have possibly contributed to the collapse of the Maya civilisation "

=== Influences ===
Socio-hydrology can be related to integrated water resources management (IWRM). In particular, while IWRM aims at controlling the water system to get desired outcomes for the environment and society, socio-hydrology aims at observing, understanding, and predicting the dynamics of coupled human-water systems. Socio-hydrology can therefore be seen as the fundamental science underpinning the practice of IWRM. Socio-hydrology can also be attractive to social scientists when its focus is given to broader topics such as sustainability, resilience, and adaptive governance. Socio-hydrologists will be benefited from the wider participation of social scientists to understand and incorporate complex social processes into hydrological models.

== Flood risk management ==
=== Levee effect ===
Floods can be mild, severe, or catastrophic. Human societies cope with flooding with a combination of structural (e.g. levees) and non-structural measures (e.g. resettlements). Structural measures, such as levees, change the frequency and magnitude of flooding. In areas protected by levees, for example, the frequency of flooding is lower, but this often cause a false sense of safety, thereby increasing exposure and vulnerability to rare and catastrophic floods.

==== Flood memory ====
In socio-hydrology, it is often assumed that societies build flood memory after extreme events. Flood memory is considered as a primary mechanism explaining the emergence of levee effects. It is hyphosised to be built after flooding and proportional to associated losses. Flood memory does decay over time. It is very difficult to observe, so proxy variable such as flood insurance coverage are used.

== Socio-hydrological modeling ==
Socio-hydrological modeling aims to describe the interactions and feedback between social and hydrological systems. There are three main areas where socio-hydrological modeling is used; system understanding, forecasting and prediction, and policy and decision making.

In socio-hydrological modeling, the holistic understanding the complete system is the main objective. Socio-hydrological models could be used to anticipate what trajectories might occur in the coming decades, depending on the present condition of a human-water system. Models can, later on, be used in policy formation and decision making, whereas it could be really useful.

=== Model classification ===
Bottom-up modeling focuses on processes to develop system behavior, whilst top-down modeling focuses on system outcomes and try to look for correlations to determine system behavior.

There can also be other differences between models. Models could be physics-based, data-based or conceptual. Another difference between models is if they are distributed or lumped, where lumped models include dynamics that vary only in time and distributed models include spatial and temporal heterogeneity.

== References and External links ==
- Socio-Hydrology of Floods
- Towards a new paradigm
- Vienna Catchment Science Symposium 2013
- HydroSocialExtremes
