= Food frequency questionnaire =

Dietary assessment tool

Food frequency questionnaire (FFQ) is a dietary assessment tool delivered as a questionnaire to estimate frequency and, in some cases, portion size information about food and beverage consumption over a specified period of time, typically the past month, three months, or year. FFQs are a common dietary assessment tool used in large epidemiologic studies of nutrition and health. Examples of usage include assessment of intake of vitamins and other nutrients, assessment of the intake of toxins, and estimating the prevalence of dietary patterns such as vegetarianism.

== Structure and data collected ==
=== Questions ===
A FFQ includes questions on a set of food and beverage items. For each food or beverage item, there may be questions asking about the following:

- Frequency of consumption (with a "never" option as well as options ranging from very infrequent to several times a day).
- Portion size information, which may be framed in terms of portion size for each round of consumption or total portion size. Respondents may be asked to translate usual consumption amount to number of specified units, such as a cup of rice. Some questionnaires include portion size images (such as photographs) in an attempt to enhance reporting accuracy.
- Other information, such as frequency of consumption at particular times of the year, or the subtype or brand that people consume.

In addition to foods and beverages, FFQs often ask about the frequency of intake and dosages of commonly consumed dietary supplements.

=== Length and administration format ===
A FFQ that aims to capture total dietary intake includes questions on 80 to 120 food and beverage items, and takes 30 to 60 minutes to complete.

FFQs may be interviewer-administered in case of low literacy as well as when being conducted on children.

FFQs are intended for individual rather than household use (i.e., they need to be answered for each individual food consumer). For very young children, the FFQ may be answered by a parent or guardian instead.

=== Types ===
FFQs are classified as:

- Non-quantitative FFQs if they collect only frequency information, and no portion size information, and
- Semi-quantitative FFQs if they collect information on both frequency and portion size.

== Relation with other assessment tools ==
=== Similar diet assessment tools ===
FFQ is a common method for dietary assessment, i.e., for constructing the respondent's diet history. Some other methods include:

- 24-hour diet recall: This is a structured interview intended to capture detailed information about all the foods and beverages consumed by the respondent in the last 24 hours. For young children, the parent or guardian may respond on the child's behalf. A variant of this method is the multiple-pass recall. Here, after an initial recall, the interviewer goes back to previous questions to clarify further details.
- Other kinds of diet history interviews, such as narrative diet histories.
- Weighted food diary (also called weighted food record): The individual records details of food and beverage in the diary at the time of consumption. A variant of this method is estimated food records, where the quantification of food and drink is estimated rather than weighed.

=== Advantages and disadvantages relative to weighted food records ===
FFQs, as well as other retrospective diet assessment methods (such as the 24-hour diet recall and other diet history methods) have the advantage that they do not directly affect the behavior of the respondent. In contrast, weighted food records may influence the participant's eating behavior. Weighted food records also carry a high respondent burden.

One disadvantage of FFQs and other retrospective methods is that they may be less accurate because participants are relying on memory rather than information recorded in real time.

=== Advantages and disadvantages relative to the 24-hour diet recall ===
FFQs have the following advantages:

- They can better capture consumption of foods consumed occasionally or episodically than the 24-hour diet recall. For instance, if people habitually consume alcohol more on Fridays, then a 24-hour diet recall conducted on Tuesday will underestimate the extent of alcohol consumption, whereas a well-designed FFQ can capture the information.
- They are easier to administer to literate populations at large scale and also easier to process than diet recalls.

FFQs have many disadvantages:

- Due to the longer time period involved, FFQs are more dependent on people having good memory as well as being able to accurately estimate the frequency of rare events (for instance, being able to correctly judge whether they consume something once a month or once a week). These are cognitively complex tasks that require good generic memory.
- FFQs lack detailed information on how the food was prepared as well as information on exactly how much was consumed and when.
- Since FFQs are limited to a fixed list of foods, they may not capture eating patterns of people who have very different eating patterns.
- FFQs are more subject (than diet recalls) to social desirability bias, with people over-reporting the extent of consumption of "healthy" foods such as fruits and vegetables.

=== Validation using other methods ===
Due to some of the concerns surrounding the validity and reliability of FFQs, research using a FFQ generally also tests the validity of the FFQ. In a typical research design, the FFQ is validated against another dietary assessment technique (such as 24-hour diet recall or weighted food records) on a small population. Once validated, the FFQ can be distributed to a wider population with the same characteristics. The need to validate FFQs against diet recalls or other more reliable methods is a recurrent theme in research and guidance on FFQs.

== Questionnaires in use ==
=== Specificity to populations ===
Since FFQs list specific food and beverage items, a FFQ designed for and validated against one population is not valid for other populations. Therefore, FFQs must be appropriately modified and revalidated against new populations. A few key challenges include:

- Different populations consume different sets of foods and beverages, so the list of items in a FFQ validated against one population may not cover all the items for the other population.
- Even when the items match in name, the methods of preparation may differ significantly enough that results from one FFQ may not be applicable to a different FFQ.
- Different populations use different languages, so the FFQ needs to be translated. Even when populations use the same language (e.g., two English-speaking countries) the jargon for specific food items can differ. Thus, for instance, in order to administer the Diet History Questionnaire (DHQ II) in Canada, a Canadian version, C-DHQ-II, was created.

A number of standard FFQs are available for adults in the United States. There is also research based on FFQs in the United Kingdom, although weighted food records are more common there. FFQs have also been developed in Sweden and other Northern and Western European countries. There has been some research on FFQs in other regions, such as the Middle East and Mediterranean, Sri Lanka, and Shanghai, China.

=== Common FFQs in the United States ===
The list below is drawn from existing lists of food frequency questionnaires. All questionnaires in the list below are validated through multiple research studies.

Questionnaire name	Developer	Format of administration	Type of FFQ	Length
Harvard FFQ, also known as the Harvard Service FFQ (HSFFQ) and the Willett FFQ	Walter Willett, M.D., and his colleagues at Harvard University (existed before 2001; most recent version created 2007)	Pen and paper version only; booklet plus analysis cost roughly $15.00-20.00 per questionnaire	Semi-quantitative	The booklet has 19 pages and 18 questions, with some of the questions having a large number of parts.
Diet History Questionnaire (DHQ)	National Cancer Institute's Risk Factor Assessment Branch. The first version, DHQ I, was developed by a team including Fran Thompson and Amy Subar and described in a paper published in 2001.	DHQ I had a single version and was paper-and-pencil-only. DHQ II has four versions, each of which can be taken online or using paper-and-pencil. A Canadian version (C-DHQ-II) is also available. Sample PDFs for paper versions are freely available. Other languages supported are Spanish (for DHQ I) and French (for the Canadian DHQ II, not available online).	Semi-quantitative	DHQ I had 124 questions and took an hour to complete. DHQ II has 134 questions in each of its four versions.
Block FFQ	National Cancer Institute, under the direction of Gladys Block. The questionnaire design was described in a 1986 paper and the first research paper validating the questionnaire was published in 1990. The FFQ was subsequently modified and a web version was created.	Pen-and-paper and web version, both available at cost. Cost is $2 per respondent for pen-and-paper version, with a minimum of $100.	Semi-quantitative	The 2014 questionnaire has questions of 127 food and beverage items, plus additional questions to adjust for fat, protein, carbohydrate, sugar, and whole grain content.
NHANES	National Cancer Institute	Pen-and-paper version mailed to large numbers of respondents periodically. Results are used as comparison baselines for other FFQs. Sample is available online.	Non-quantitative (mostly; a few questions asked about quantities)	The 2003/2004 booklet has 139 questions and 24 pages.

== Analysis of data ==
=== Calculation of nutrient intake (for semi-quantitative FFQs) ===
Calculations for nutrient intake can be estimated via computerized software programs that multiply the reported frequency of each food by the amount of nutrient in a serving of that food. References databases commonly used for this purpose are listed below. Note that to estimate total nutrient intake, it is necessary to include dietary supplements in the FFQ and add the nutrient intake from these, particularly when dealing with populations where the consumption of dietary supplements is common.

- The United States Department of Agriculture Food and Nutrient Database for Dietary Studies (FNDDS), which in turn is based on the USDA National Nutrient Database. To incorporate the effect of dietary supplements, the USDA Dietary Supplement Integrated Database (DSID) can be used.
- The University of Minnesota Nutrition Coordinating Center (NCC)'s Food and Nutrient Database.

For non-quantitative FFQs, nutrient intake cannot be calculated as accurately, but the FFQ can still be used to get a rough idea of nutrient consumption.

=== Calculation of food groups consumed ===
A related use of FFQs is to determine how much people consume broad groups of foods. Examples of such food groups are fruits, vegetables, and added sugars. A useful database for this purpose is the USDA's Food Patterns Equivalents Database (FPED).

=== Comparison data ===
In the United States, data from NHANES is used to provide nationwide comparison data.

=== Population-level analyses ===
FFQs can be used for a variety of population-level analyses:

- Estimation of total consumption of specific foods, food groups, and nutrients in a population.
- Estimation of the correlation between patterns of food consumption and other non-diet variables, such as health status or specific medical conditions.
- Estimation of the effectiveness of interventions to change diet. In this experimental design, both the experiment subjects and the control group are asked to fill in the FFQ before and after the intervention, and changes in food consumption patterns for the experimental group are measured. However, because of concern about potential differential response bias due to the tendency of the intervention group to misreport their diets to a greater extent than the control group, use of an FFQ (or any self-report dietary instrument) as the sole evaluation method should be carefully considered. Diet can also be evaluated as a confounding factor when assessing the efficacy of a drug intervention or the efficiency of a behavioral intervention.

== Criticism ==
The low validity of FFQs has made them a subject of criticism. Walter Willett, developer of the Harvard FFQ, estimated a correlation of 0.60 to 0.70 between standard FFQs and diet recalls.

Alan R. Kristal, Ulrike Peters and John D. Potter wrote in their article "Is It Time to Abandon the Food Frequency Questionnaire?" that there was not much scope to learn more from FFQs, and that a more curious and exploratory approach was needed to uncover new insights on diet and its correlation with health status.

The National Cancer Institute has argued that through careful bias correction, some of the limitations of FFQs can be overcome, and they can be very useful.
