= Kalladi (Batticaloa) =

Kallady கல்லடி කල්ලඪිය
- Village
- Location within Sri Lanka
- Coordinates: 7°42′0″N 81°42′32″E
- Country: Sri Lanka
- Province: Eastern
- District: Batticaloa
- DS Division: Manmunai North

Kallady (Tamil: கல்லடி) is a village within the Batticaloa District of Eastern province of Sri Lanka. It lies north of Batticaloa city. As part of ongoing Sri Lankan civil war, the Kallady village has military installments. 2004 Tsunami affected the village resulting in major loss of life and property. It has the Samādhi of Swami Vipulananda a noted social reformer

Kalladi Beach

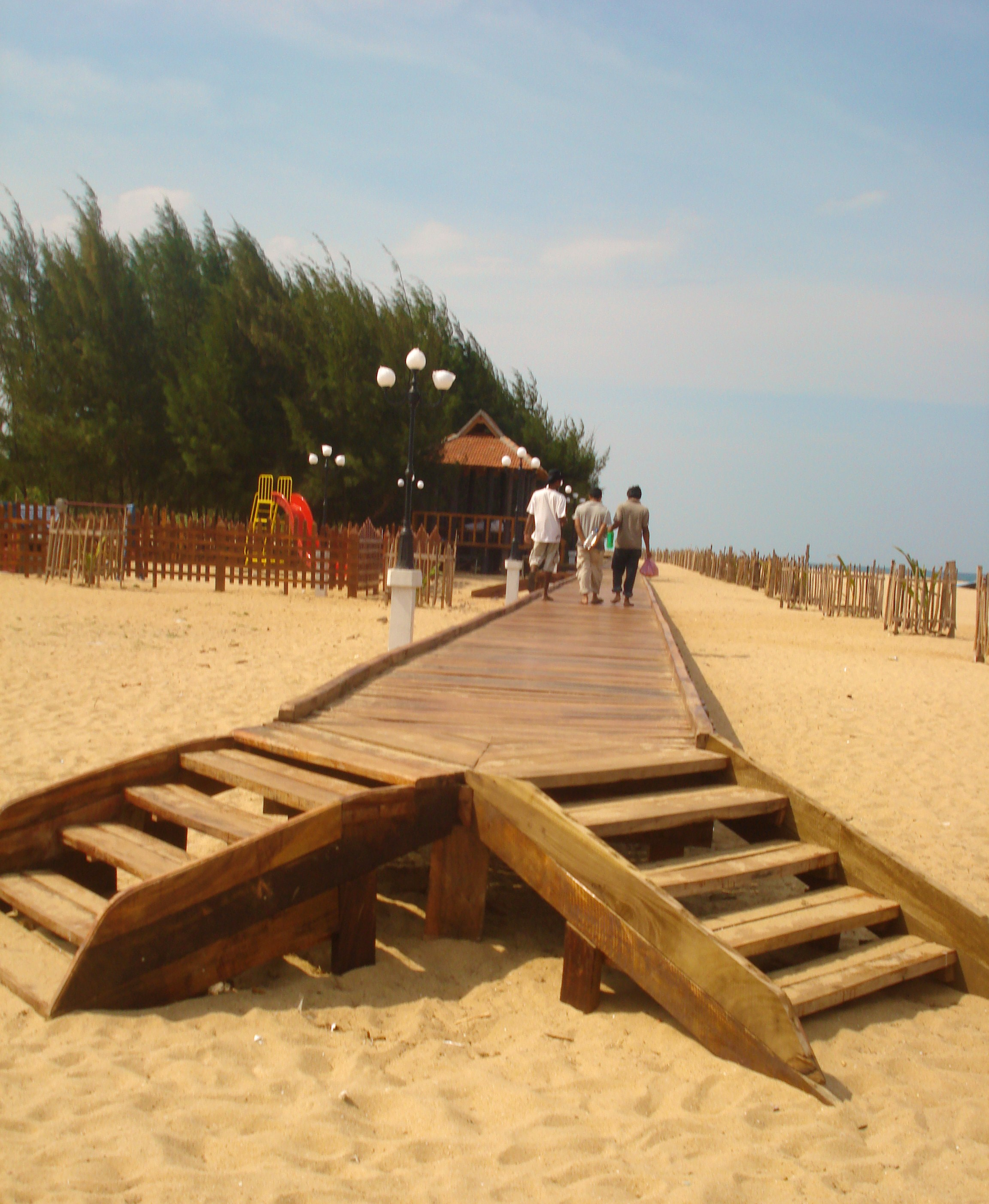

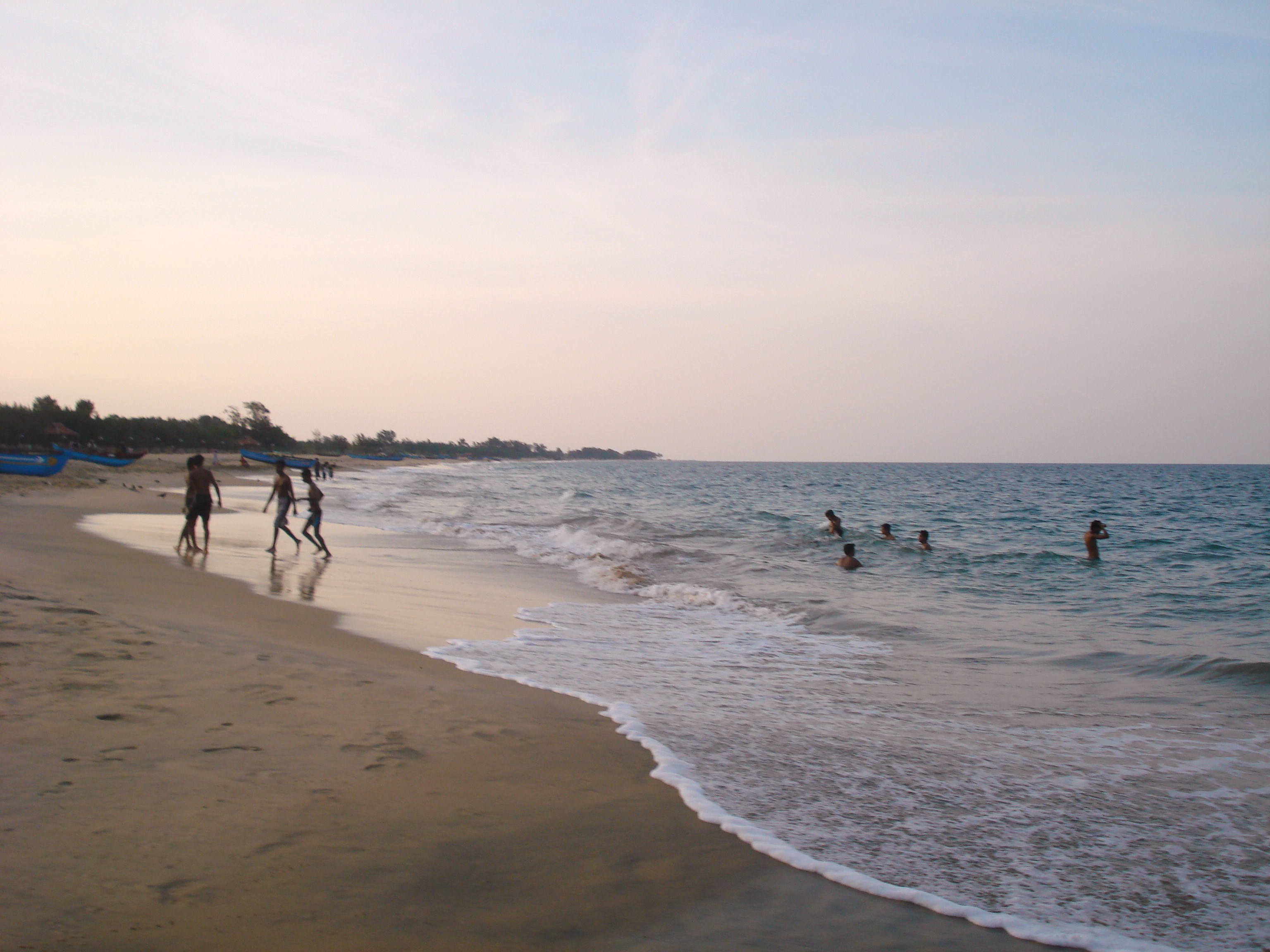

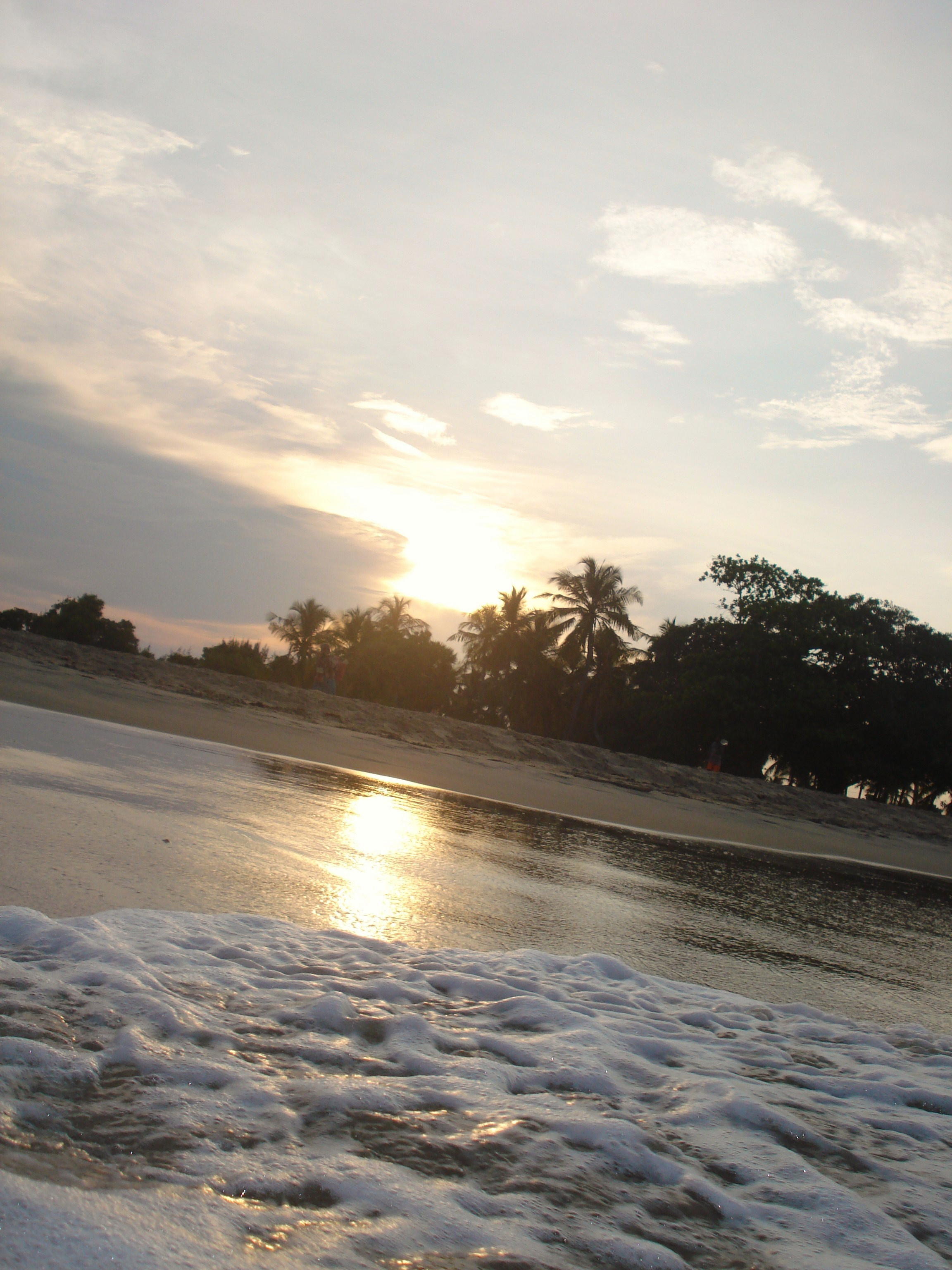
Kallady beach

== Education ==
The RKM Shivananda National School is located here.

== See also ==
- The American Batticaloa Development Fund, new coconut plantation after 2004 tsunami
