= Eastern University, Sri Lanka =

University in Sri Lanka

- கிழக்கு பல்கலைக்கழகம் ශ්‍රී ලංකා නැගෙනහිර විශ්වවිද්‍යාලය
- Former name: Batticaloa University College (1981–1986)
- Motto: Per ardua ad scientiam (Latin)
- Type: Public
- Established: 1 August 1981; 45 years ago
- Accreditation: University Grants Commission (Sri Lanka)
- Affiliations: Association of Commonwealth Universities, International Association of Universities
- Budget: Rs. 478 million (2013)
- Chancellor: M. Selvarajah
- Vice-Chancellor: V Kanagasingam
- Students: 1110 new admissions per year (2013)
- Location: Vantharumoolai, Eastern Province, Sri Lanka; 7°47′51.40″N 81°34′55.20″E
- Campus: Government University
- Website: esn.ac.lk

The Eastern University, Sri Lanka (abbreviated as EUSL) is a public university in Vantharumoolai, Eastern Province, Sri Lanka. It was established on 1 October 1986. The university was preceded by the Batticaloa University College established on 1 August 1981 which was started in the buildings of the Vantharumoolai Madya Maha Vidyalayam.

At present, the university has a main campus at Vantharumoolai, Trincomalee Campus at Trincomalee, and the Swami Vipulananda Institute of Aesthetic Studies (SVIAS) at Kalladi, with the facilities of Library Network, Centre for Information and Communication Technology and Sports.

Like all public universities in Sri Lanka, it receives the bulk of its funding from the University Grants Commission (UGC), which is a part of the Ministry of Higher Education in Colombo.

== History ==
The idea of having a Tamil university on the lines of Hebrew University of Israel in the Eastern Province was mooted in 1960 by a group of professors who taught at the University of Ceylon. The project was started by purchasing land near Nilaveli, Trincomalee and was abandoned later due to lack of funds. The project was revived by K. W. Devanayakam, a former home minister of the UNP government with the collaboration of Kalpage, Minister of Higher Education during 1981.

The Eastern University, Sri Lanka, was established on 1 October 1986 by a University Order dated 26 September 1986 which was issued under Section 2 of the Universities Act No: 16 of 1978 by the Central Government. The university was preceded by the Batticaloa University College established on 1 August 1981. The Batticaloa University College was established to fill a long-felt need for the development of a higher education institution in the Eastern Province. Its establishment was recommended by a Committee appointed by the University Grants Commission headed by Professor V. Appapillai, retired professor of Physics and dean of Science, University of Peradeniya and included Professor R.S. Ramakrishna, Professor Y.D.A. Senanayake, Professor S.T. Fernando, S.H.M.Jameel and Dixon Nilaweera.

K. W. Devanayagam, who at the time was Member of Parliament for Kalkudah electorate and Minister of Justice, took a personal interest in the establishment of the Batticaloa University College. It was established in the premises of the Vantharumoolai Madhya Maha Vidyalayam, a school built by the V. Nalliah, Minister for Posts and Telecommunication, Member of Parliament for Kalkudah electorate and Member of the Senate Council for Batticaloa North. The buildings had been badly damaged by a cyclone of 1978 and were repaired and progressively restructured to suit the purposes of a new University College. In addition, over 100 acres of land were added to the original campus. Student hostels and staff quarters have been constructed on this land and many new buildings are planned.

The Batticaloa University College began with two faculties: the Faculty of Science and the Faculty of Agriculture. These faculties were affiliated to the University of Peradeniya. S. Rajaratnam was appointed as the director of the college and he functioned in this capacity until February 1985. K. Rajendra functioned as the first secretary of the college. He was succeeded by P. Sangaravel in June 1983. K. D. Arulpragasam was appointed S. Rajaratnam as director in April 1985. He successfully negotiated upgrading of the university college to an independent university and was appointed the first vice-chancellor, when the university came into being in October 1986. S. H. M. Jameel was appointed as the first registrar.

Two new faculties – the Faculty of Commerce & Management with the Departments of Economics, Commerce & Management, and the Faculty of Cultural Studies with the Departments of Arabic, Islamic Studies, and Fine Arts – were established in 1988. The Faculty of Cultural Studies was expanded to include the departments of Languages, Geography and Social Science and renamed as Faculty of Arts & Culture in 1991.

The Trincomalee Campus was originally established as Trincomalee Affiliated University College (AUC) in April 1993 under ordinance No. 01 of 1993 by the Universities Act No.16 of 1978, section 24A. Then the Trincomalee Campus of the Eastern University was established from 15 June 2001 by a Gazette notification which was dated 6 June 2001.

The Swami Vipulananda College of Music and Dance (SVCMD) was established in 1981 by the Ministry of Regional Affairs and Hindu Culture. Subsequently, the SVCMD was ceremonially handed over to the Ministry of Higher Education by the Ministry of Cultural Affairs on 20 April 2001. It was affiliated with the Eastern University, Sri Lanka on 1 January 2002, and the University Grants Commission permitted EUSL to enroll diploma holders of the Swami Vipulananda College of Music and Dance for a degree programme in the Department of Fine Arts. Then the SVCMD was renamed as Swami Vipulananda Institute of Aesthetic Studies and established by the Gazette Notification of the Democratic Socialist Republic of Sri Lanka (No. 1392/22 of 3 June 2005) under the order made by the section 24 B of the University Act. No 16 of 1978.

The government of Sri Lanka has by Gazette notification dated 23 November 2005 established the Faculty of Health-Care Sciences of the Eastern University, Sri Lanka. The initial programme conducted by the university in Human Health Sciences before the establishment of this faculty was the post basic diploma in Nursing. After the establishment of the faculty at Batticaloa in the silver jubilee year (2006) of the university, the first batch of students for Medicine were enrolled. The course commenced in June 2006. The first batch of students for BSc. Nursing was enrolled and the course was commenced in 2008.

In January 2011, the Minister of Higher Education came to the conclusion that the affairs of the Eastern University had been seriously squandered due to mismanagement and appointed a Competent Authority replacing the Council of EUSL. The Competent Authority so appointed was Ranjith Arthenayake, who had been the vice-chancellor of the Open University of Sri Lanka from 1994 to 2000.

The applications for the post of vice-chancellor was called in late 2011, and the selection was made in February 2012. It was expected Somasuntharam Sutharsan, who is an Eastern University product, would have succeeded to the chair of the vice-chancellor. Sutharsan was considered to be the favorite candidate of the local politicians. However, in February 2012, Kiddnan Kobindarajah, who is an alumnus of the Eastern University, was appointed as vice-chancellor on 5 March 2012. Kobindarajah obtained his Ph.D. in South Africa and then, due to political pressure arising from his personal beliefs/activities, he immigrated to Canada and eventually became a naturalized Canadian citizen. Kobindarajah completed his term in office as the vice-chancellor on 4 March 2015. Since the government of Sri Lanka had allocated a considerable amount of funding to develop the universities that were affected by the ethnic conflict in the North and Eastern provinces, there was a huge development of infrastructure facilities of the university during his period. T. Jeyasingam took over as the new Vice-Chancellor, after Kobindarajah and he operated somewhat ineffectively as the Vice Chancellor. His leadership has been criticized for actions of favoritism, nepotism and factionalism. It is noted that Jeyasingham's ardent use of official facilities and funds for personal purposes has been cited by many concerned well-wishers of the university. In January 2019, F. C. Ragel (a physicist attached to the Faculty of Science) – officially took over as the new vice chancellor replacing the former incumbent Dr. Jeyasingham.

Former vice-chancellors of the Eastern University, Sri Lanka are:

- Prof K D Arudpragasam (1986–1989)
- Prof S Sandanam (1989–1995)
- Prof G F Rajendram (1995–1998)
- Dr. C Y Thangarajah, acting (1998–2000)
- Prof M S Mookiah (2000–2004)
- Prof (Dr.) S Raveendranath (2004–2006)
- Dr. N Pathmanathan (2006–2010)
- Dr K Premakumar, acting (2010 – March 2012 )
- Dr. K Kobindarajah (March 2012 – March 2015 )
- Prof (Dr.) T. Jayasingham (March 2015 – January 2019 )
- Prof. (Dr.) F.C. Ragel (Feb 2019 - Feb 2022)
- Prof V Kanagasingam ( Feb 2022- Feb 2025)

== Location ==
The eastern region of Sri Lanka comprises the districts of Trincomalee, Batticaloa and Ampara, and covers an area of approximately 980,000 ha, about 15% of the total land area of the island. The population of one million is largely rural, with around 75% being engaged in agriculture and 15% in fishing.

The main administrative block of the Eastern University, Sri Lanka (senate building) is in Vantharumoolai, Chenkalady, which is on the Batticaloa-Pollanaruwa main road, about 18 km north of Batticaloa town and four faculties: Faculty of Science, Faculty of Agriculture, Faculty of Commerce & Management and Faculty of Arts & Culture are housed here. Faculty of Health-Care Sciences situated 15 km from Vantharumooali in Batticaloa which is offering MBBS and BSc Nursing degrees. Swami Vipulananda Institute of Aesthetic Studies is 3 km from the Faculty of Health Care Sciences in Kallady Uppodai which is offering BFA in Music, Dance, Drama & Theatre Arts and Visual & Technological Arts. Trincomalee Campus is 180 km from the Vantharumoolai at Konesapuri in Trincomalee district having two faculties and one unit: Faculty of Communication and Business studies, Faculty of Applied Sciences and Siddha Medicine Unit.

== Entities and degree programmes ==
The following Institute, Campus and faculties are functioning and offering the relevant degrees:

=== Institute ===
- Swamy Vipulanantha Institute of Aesthetic Studies (SVIAS)
  - B.FA (Dance)
  - B.FA (Drama & Theatre)
  - B.FA (Music)
  - B.FA (Visual & Technological Arts)

=== Campus ===
- Trincomalee Campus
  - Faculty of Communication and Business Studies
    - B.A. (Communication)
    - B.A. (Languages)
    - BSc (Marketing Management)
    - BSc (Human Resource Management)
    - B.M.
  - Faculty of Applied Science
    - BSc (Applied Physics and Electronics)
    - BCS (Bachelor of Computer Science)
  - Siddha Medicine Unit
    - B.S.M.S.

=== Faculties ===
- Faculty of Science – BSc (Special) & BSc (General)
- Faculty of Agriculture – BSc in Agriculture
- Faculty of Commerce and Management – B.BA, B.Com. & B.Econ
- Faculty of Arts and Culture – B.A (General) & B.A (Special)
- Faculty of Health Care Sciences – M.B.B.S & BSc in Nursing
- Faculty of Technology
- Faculty of Graduate Studies ( MA, MSc, MDE, MEd, MPhil, PhD)

== Administration and staff ==
The administration of the university is mainly managed by the University Council and the senate. The council members are of two types: Ex-Officio Members and Appointed Members by the UGC. Other than these main two bodies, there are Faculty Boards for each and every faculties under the control of faculty deans and the heads of the departments. Other important committees of the university are: Senior Management Committee, Leave and Awards Committee, Finance Committee and Audit Committee.

In the administration, the vice-chancellor is the chief executive officer and the academic and administrative head of all activities of the university, whereas the Registrar is the manager of all non-academic administration. The Administration Branch, Examination Branch, Establishment (Academic), Establishment (Non-Academic), Welfare Branch, Bursar the custodian of funds and overall in charge of financial activities of the university managing Supply Branch, Accounts Branch, Payments Branch. The current registrar of the EUSL is A. Pahirathan and Bursar is M.M Mureez Fareez

The number of teaching staff of the eastern university was 165 with 2 professors, 87 senior lectures and 76 lectors in 2011; the total number of non-teaching staff was 308.

== University admission and budget allocation ==
The university had 3,416 undergraduate students in 2011 with 1040 new admissions and 490 graduate output. Swami Vipulanantha Institute of Aesthetic Studies (SWIAS) had 923 undergraduate students with 227 new admissions and 45 graduate output. The postgraduate student enrolment in 2011 was 219, with 18 PG diploma, 187 masters/mPhil, and 14 PhD The postgraduate student's output were 8 in 2011. The total number of students who were enrolled in the external degree programs in the Eastern University was 1207, with 11 graduated in 2011.

The university has a recurrent allocation of Rs. 475 million and a capital allocation of Rs. 477 million in the 2013 budget.

== Faculties and departments ==
The Eastern University has seven faculties, a Campus and an institute.

=== Main campus ===
==== Faculty of Science ====
The Faculty of Science has run since the establishment of the Batticaloa University College on 1 August 1981. It consists of five departments: the Department of Botany, Department of Chemistry, Department of Mathematics, Department of Physics and Department of Zoology. The Departments of Botany and Zoology have a good collection of locally endemic and imported species in their herbarium and museum. The Faculty offers the subjects Botany, Chemistry, Applied Mathematics, Pure Mathematics, Computer Science, Physics and Zoology.

The Faculty of Science was allocated a portion of the restructured Vantharumoolai Madya Maha Vidyalaya buildings. The building space is hardly enough to satisfy the needs of the growing faculty. A larger science building complex is proposed.

The Zoology block of the Science complex is completed, and consists of modern lecture halls and laboratories to accommodate additional intake of students. The blocks for the Department of Physics, Botany, Mathematics and administration for the Faculty will be constructed in the near future.

==== Faculty of Agriculture ====
The establishment of the Faculty of Agriculture in 1981 was expected to serve as a catalyst for the agricultural and socio-economic development of the region. The agriculture education and research pursued by the Faculty cater to the special needs of the region with a view to uplifting of the social and economic standards of a predominantly rural population, who depend largely on agriculture.

The Faculty of Agriculture consists of six departments: Agricultural Biology, Agricultural Economics, Agricultural Chemistry, Agricultural Engineering, Animal Sciences and Crop Science. The faculty has established a Centre for Sustainable Agriculture and Resource Management (CENSARM). The faculty has crop and livestock farms, about 15 acres for teaching purposes and for the issue of seeds, planting materials and breeding stock of farm animals to the public. Arrangements are being made to expand these activities in another 10-acre farm taken over from the Research Training and Farm Complex of the Department of Agriculture at Karadianaru. Equipment and laboratory facilities for teaching and research are available in each Department of study.

The present dean of the faculty is Prof. (Mrs.) P. Premanandarajah.

==== Faculty of Commerce and Management ====
The Faculty of Commerce and Management was established in 1988 and offers programs designed to provide students with a sound understanding of the functions of Business and their inter-relationships. The faculty strives to develop in its students an understanding of nature of modern business, including an awareness of emerging business opportunities and the constraints within those opportunities may be explored. It requires students to apply the analytical skills developed in the study of general education to the real business situation.

The Faculty comprises the Departments of Management, Commerce, and Economics and cross-discipline courses between faculties are also available subject to demand and availability of resources. The faculty offers programs leading to a four years undergraduate degree in Bachelor of Business Administration (BBA), Bachelor of Commerce (B.Com.), and Bachelor of Economics (B. Econ). The faculty also offers four years External Degrees Programmes leading to a bachelor's degree in Business Administration (BBA) and Commerce (B.Com.) and a two years Diploma program in Business Administration. It offers Postgraduate Diploma in Management leading to Master of Business Administration, which is designed specially to cater the people in service at CEO level and Master in Development Economics.

The present dean of the faculty is Prof. N. Rajeshwaran.

==== Faculty of Arts and Culture ====
The Faculty of Arts and Culture with the Departments of Arabic, Islamic Studies, and Fine Arts was established in 1988. The Faculty of Cultural Studies was then expanded to include the Departments of Languages, Geography and Social Science in 1991 and renamed as Faculty of Arts & Culture.

At present, the Faculty of Arts & Culture consists of nine departments, namely, Department of Arabic, Fine Arts, Geography, Islamic Studies, Languages, Social Sciences, History, Comparative Religion & Social Harmony and Education & Childcare with additional three disciplines, namely, Economics, Christianity & Hindu Civilization. And also the faculty comprises Centre for Early Childhood Care & Development (CECCD) and Centre for Social Research & Development (CSRD).

The faculty offers programs of the undergraduate degree in Bachelor of Arts (BA) – general and special. The faculty also offers Bachelor of Education (BEd) special degree, Master of Arts (MA), Master of Education (MEd), Master of Philosophy (M.Phil.), Doctor of Philosophy, diploma in Preschool Education and Certificate Course in Psychosocial Work.

The present dean is Dr.V. Gunapalasingam.

==== Faculty of Health Care Sciences ====
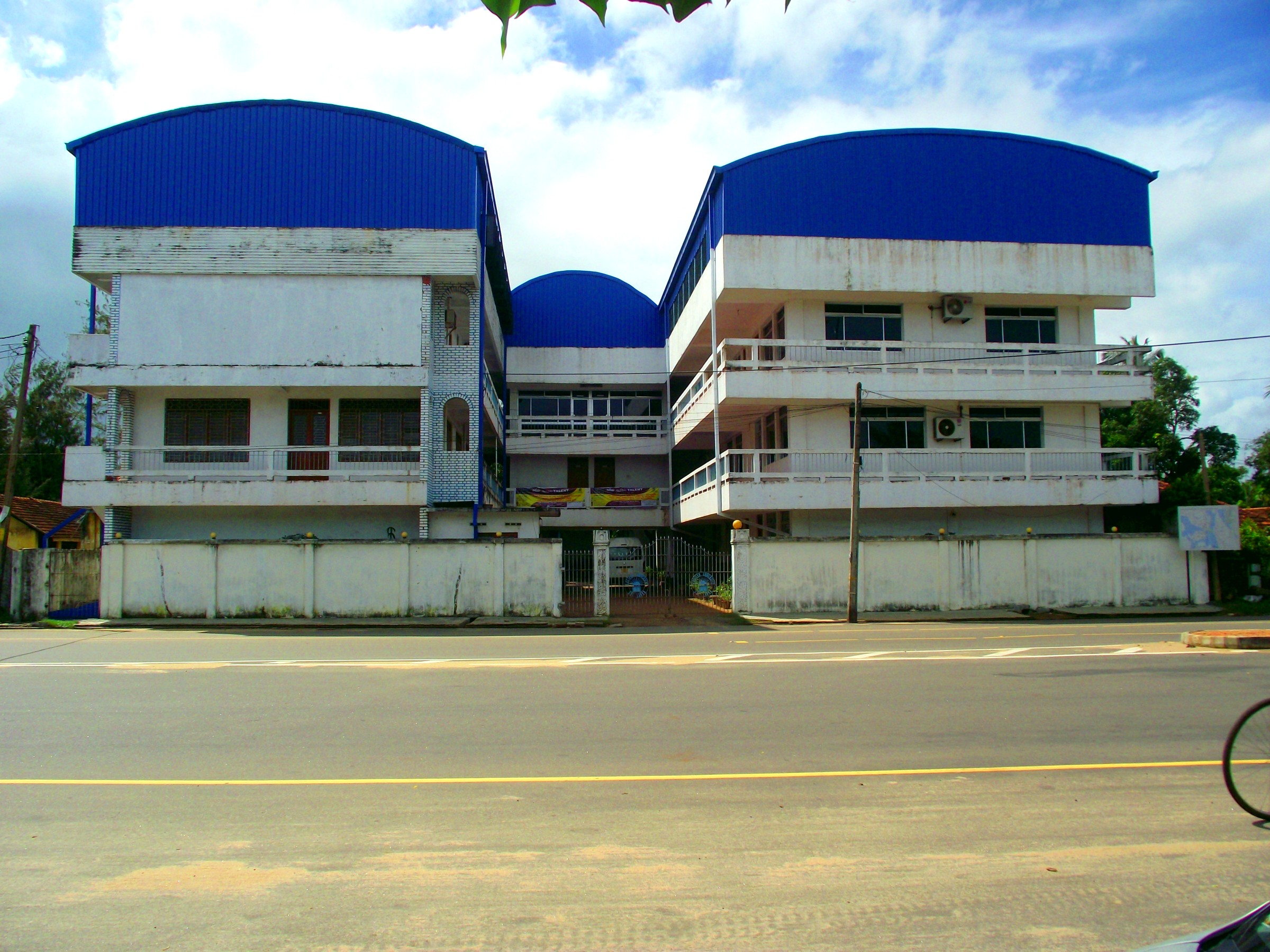
Faculty of Healthcare Sciences, EUSL

The concept of establishing a Faculty of Health Sciences arose in the nineties. In its move, the late President R. Premadasa has taken steps to elevate the General Hospital Batticaloa as a Teaching Hospital in 1993. A committee comprising prominent intellectuals formed the Medical Faculty Committee which included Prof. T. Varagunam (former Chancellor, EUSL), Dr. J.T. Xavier, Prof. R. Maheswaran, Prof. G.F. Rajendram (then Vice-Chancellor) and Dr. K. Kunanandem to devise the curriculum for the MBBS course.

The government of Sri Lanka established the Faculty of Health Care Sciences of the Eastern University in 2005 with six departments: Human Biology, Pathophysiology, Clinical Sciences, Primary Health Care, Medical Education & Research and Supplementary Health Sciences. Dr. K. Kunanandem, a London qualified neurosurgeon, was appointed as the first dean to pioneer the faculty. He was made a member of the University Grants Commission and was entrusted the duty of designing and developing the said faculty. Kunanandham died unexpectedly in London when he was with his family. Therefore, the first dean of the faculty was Dr.K. E. Karunakaran, an obstetrician, and gynecologist attached to the Teaching Hospital, Batticaloa.

The faculty offers mainly of two courses of studies: Medicine (MBBS) and Nursing (BSc). The first batch of students for MBBS programme was enrolled in 2006 in the Faculty of Health Care Sciences, graduating in 2013.

The present dean of the faculty is Dr. T. Sathananthan, consultant physician of Teaching Hospital Batticaloa.

Faculty of Graduate Studies

=== Trincomalee Campus ===
In its formative years the Trincomalee Campus functioned as an Affiliated University College (AUC) operating under the umbrella of affiliated colleges funded by the University Grants Commission in the early nineties to help those to whom the conventional universities closed their doors. The Trincomalee Affiliated University College, in its turn, conducted two diploma programmes viz. Diploma in English and Diploma in Accountancy and Finance, the former under the supervision of the University of Sri Jayawardenepura and the latter under the supervision of the Eastern University, Sri Lanka.

When the affiliated university college system was abolished, Trincomalee AUC found itself vested with the Eastern University and the two-degree programmes initially conducted here then under two different faculties of the Eastern University, Sri Lanka had as their fortunate forerunners the diploma holders of the AUC. Subsequently, this college was got its identity as Trincomalee Campus of the Eastern University, Sri Lanka through a gazette notification from mid 2001 with provision for two faculties, Faculty of Communication & Business Studies and Faculty of Applied Science. In 2008 the discipline of siddha medicine was introduced.

The present rector of the campus is Prof (Mrs). Chandravathany G Devadason.

==== Faculty of Applied Sciences ====
The Faculty of Applied Sciences of Trincomalee Campus consists of two departments, namely, Department of Computer Science and Department of Physical Science and offers degree of Bachelor of Science in Computer Science and Bachelor of Science in Applied Physics and Electronics respectively. The heads of these departments are Mrs. T. Thanushya and Mr. K. Balashangar respectively. The present dean of the faulty is Mr. S. Thadchanamoorthy.

==== Faculty of Communication & Business Studies ====
Faculty of Communication and Business studies consists of two departments, Department of Languages and Communication Studies and Department of Business and Management Studies. At present the Faculty of Communication and Business Studies offers General and Special Degrees in Communication Studies (B.A. in Communication Studies), and three-year (General) degree in Languages (B.A. in Languages – English) and General and Special Degrees in Management (BSc Majoring / Special in Accountancy Management/ Marketing Management/ Human Resource Management / Information Management).

The present dean of the faculty is Mr. T. Basker.

==== Faculty of Siddha Medicine ====
The new discipline Bachelor of Siddha Medicine & Surgery (B.S.M.S.) Degree Course was introduced from 2008/2009 Academic year. Duration of the course is five years with a cohort of 20 per year. One year internship is compulsory after completion of degree course.

The Unit of Siddha medicine was upgraded as a Faculty of Siddha Medicine with three departments in 2023.

=== Swami Vipulanantha Institute of Aesthetic Studies (SVIAS) ===
The Swami Vipulananda College of Music and Dance (SVCMD) was established in 1981 by the Ministry of Regional Affairs and Hindu Culture. Subsequently, the SVCMD was ceremonially handed over to the Ministry of Higher Education on 20 April 2001. It was affiliated to the Eastern University, Sri Lanka on 1 January 2002, and the University Grants Commission permitted the Eastern University, Sri Lanka to enroll Diploma Holders of the Swami Vipulananda College of Music and Dance for a degree programme in the Department of Fine Arts. Then the SVCMD was renamed as Swami Vipulanantha Institute of Aesthetic Studies (SVIAS) and established by the Gazette Notification of the Democratic Socialist Republic of Sri Lanka (No. 1392/22 of 3 June 2005) under the order made by the section 24 B of the University Act. No 16 of 1978.

At present, the institute consist of four departments of studies: Carnatic Music; Dance & Drama & Theatre Arts; Visual & Technological Arts; and Information Technology. It offers Bachelor of Fine Arts (BFA) in Music, Dance and Visual & Technological Arts.

The present director of this Institute is Prof. F.B. Kennedy.
