= Point Pedro Hospital =

- Ministry of Health, Northern Province

Geography
- Location: Point Pedro, Jaffna District, Northern Province, Sri Lanka
- Coordinates: 9°48′19.10″N 80°13′27.70″E

Organisation
- Care system: Public

Services
- Emergency department: Yes
- Beds: 264

Links
- Lists: Hospitals in Sri Lanka

Point Pedro Hospital is a government hospital in Point Pedro, Sri Lanka. It is controlled by the provincial government in Jaffna. As of 2010 it had 264 beds. The hospital is sometimes called Point Pedro Base Hospital.

As well as general medical and surgical care the hospital provides a wide variety of healthcare services including diabetic, dentistry, dermatology, family planning, gynaecology, obstetrics (ante-natal), oncology, ophthalmology, paediatrics, psychiatry and tuberculosis. The hospital also has an emergency department, a physiotherapy unit, an x-ray unit and a blood bank service.

In 2010 the hospital had 16,979 in-patient admissions, 141,939 out-patient visits and 67,111 clinic visits.
