= Sri Lankan Tamil diaspora =

Sri Lankan Tamil Diaspora
புலம்பெயர் ஈழத் தமிழர்
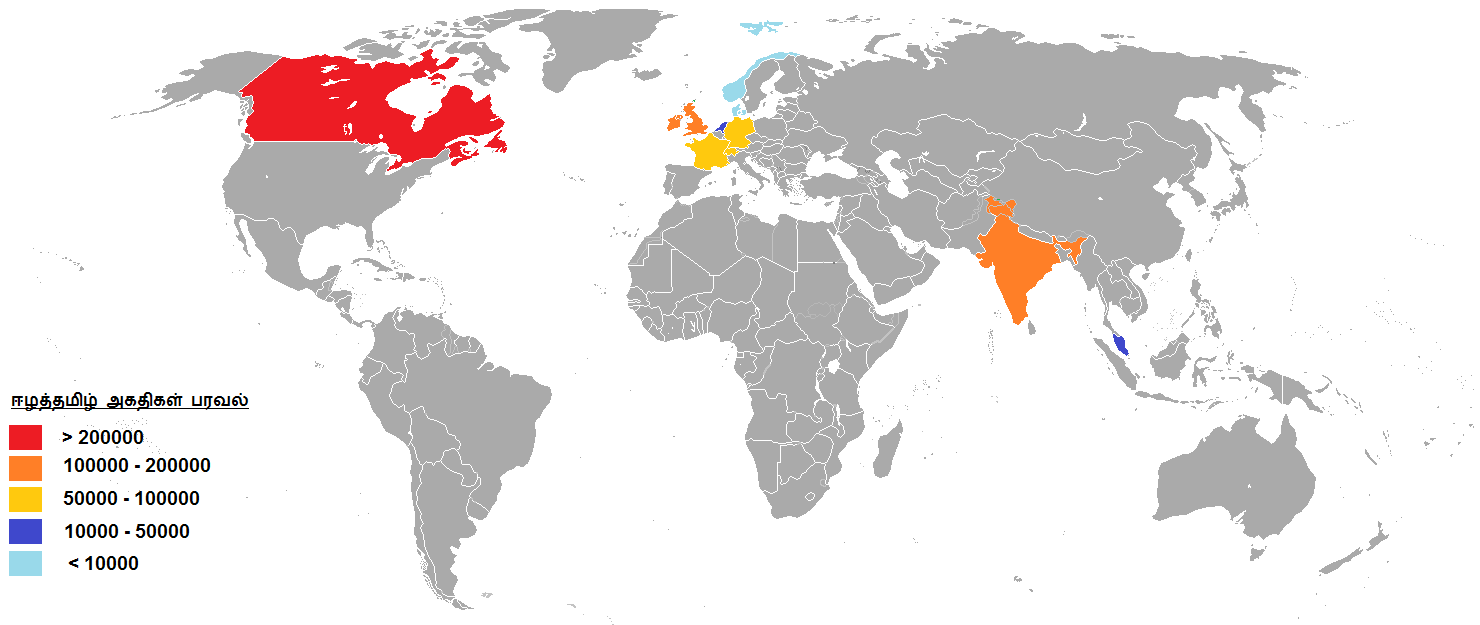

Total population
- 887,000 (estimated)

Regions with significant populations
- Canada: ~200,000 (2007)
- United Kingdom: ~120,000 (2007)
- India: ~100,000 (2005)
- Germany: ~60,000 (2008)
- France: ~50,000 (2008)
- Switzerland: ~35,000 (2006)
- Singapore: ~30,000 (1985)
- United States: ~25,000 (2010)
- Malaysia: ~24,436 (1970)
- Norway: ~10,000 (2000)
- Denmark: ~9,000 (2003)
- Sweden: ~6,000 (2000)

Languages
- Tamil, English, Italian, French, Malay, Dutch, German, Portuguese, Norwegian, Danish, Swedish, Irish, Scots, Welsh

Religion
- Predominantly Hinduism of Saivite and Vaishnavite sects with a Christian minority

Related ethnic groups
- Indian Tamils; Portuguese Burghers; Sinhalese; Sri Lankan Moors; Veddas; Giraavarus; Dravidian people

The Sri Lankan Tamil diaspora refers to the global diaspora of native Sri Lankan Tamil origin. It was influenced in part by the larger-scale Sri Lankan and Tamil diaspora.

Like other diasporas of former British Empire territories, Sri Lankan Tamils are scattered and dispersed around the globe, with concentrations in South Africa, United Kingdom, Canada, India, Europe, Australia, United States, Malaysia, Singapore, Seychelles and Mauritius.

== British colonial period ==
The British Empire's demand for clerks drove migrations to Malaya, Singapore and the Madras Presidency, to become a middleman minority.

=== Malaysia and Singapore ===
Sri Kandaswamy Kovil along Jalan Scott

Ceylonese Tamils made up an overwhelming majority in the civil service of British Malaya and Singapore prior to independence. It was in Malaysia and Singapore, that the term "Ceylonese" and "Jaffnese" were popularly used by the Sri Lankan Tamils to differentiate themselves from the larger Malaysian Indian and Indian Singaporean population who were predominantly of Tamil origin (but as of today, they are considered a sub-ethnicity of these races in the respective national censuses of their adoptive countries due to the similarities of religion, ethnicity, and language with the local ethnic Indian population of Tamil origin). The Malaysian Sri Lankan Tamil community is the fifth largest South Asian community in Malaysia, after Tamils, Malayalis, Gujaratis, Telugus, Bengalis, Sindhis and Punjabis.

In Kuala Lumpur, the Ceylon Tamil population was mainly concentrated in Brickfields and Sentul because of the proximity of the Administrative Centre of the Malayan Railway and the Sentul Workshop. The Government provided accommodation for the white and the blue collar workers in these areas. The Ceylon Tamils living in both these areas were devout Saivites and as they fervently believed that "no one should live in a place that has no Temple," they soon began to organize themselves into Associations. This gave birth to the Sri Kandaswamy Kovil, Brickfields, which has become a landmark and tourist attraction in the city, showcasing Sri Lankan Tamil and Hindu architecture at its finest.

Many of the first Asian and non-white doctors and engineers in Malaya and Singapore were of Sri Lankan Tamil descent. The world's first Asian surgeon was Dr. S.S. Thiruchelvam, a Malayan of Ceylonese Tamil origin.

The Ceylonese community established many schools, banks, cultural societies, cooperatives and temples in Malaysia and Singapore. Some good examples would be the Jaffnese Cooperative Society, Vivekananda Ashrama and the Vivekananda Tamil School in Brickfields, Kuala Lumpur. In 1958 The Malaysian Ceylonese Congress was established as a political party with the aim of giving support to the then Alliance party. MCC has continuously supported the Barisan Nasional and the Government. It was formed to promote and preserve the Political, Educational, Social and Cultural aspects of the Malaysian Ceylonese Community. To date, MCC has seen six President's:- 1. Mr. M.W Navaratnam AMN, JP (1958–1969) 2. Senator Tan Sri Dato' Sri Dr. C.Sinnadurai PSM, PSD, PNBS, DPMP, SMK (1970–1983) 3. Tan Sri Dato' Seri V.Jeyaratnam PSM, SPMP (1983–1988) 4. Dato' Dr. N.Arumugasamy DSIJ, JSM (1988–1995) 5. Dato' Seri Dr. D.M.Thuraiappah SPMP, AMN, ASA (1996–2003) 6. Dato' Dr. NKS Tharmaseelan DPTJ, PMC, ANS (2004–Present) Today MCC makes its way in this ever-changing globe under the dynamic leadership of Dato' Dr. NKS Tharmaseelan. After 50 years of hibernation, MCC has now become visible. The MCC was formally registered with the Malaysian Election's Commission (SPR) on 27 February 2009.

Many Ceylonese were also involved in the independence movements in Malaya and Singapore. In Singapore, there are many current and past ministers who are of Ceylonese Tamil in origin and Tamil is a national language. Sinnathamby Rajaratnam was the former foreign minister and deputy prime minister of Singapore and regarded as one of the founding fathers of Singapore. His death in 2006 was marked with a state funeral by the government of Singapore. The Singapore flag was flown at half-mast at all public buildings and former Prime Minister and friend Lee Kuan Yew cried when giving his eulogy.

The Sri Lankan community in Malaysia and Singapore is known to be an upwardly mobile community taking up many professional and government posts. One of Malaysia's and South East Asia's richest men is billionaire Tan Sri Ananda Krishnan, who has appeared on Forbes magazine's billionaire list.

== Before 1983 ==
During the period post-independence and prior to Black July 1983, there was not much migration.

However, this changed as the government of Sri Lanka, which tended to be controlled by Sinhalese started introducing policies, such as the Sinhala Only Act, which curtailed opportunities for Tamils in Sri Lanka.

Before 1956, Tamils were proportionately over-represented in the civil service because of their high achievement and perceived preferential treatment by the Colonial Rulers. Until 1956, this was their passport to government employment. As Cheran (2000: 110) argues, "[t]he class dimension of the Sinhala Only Act must not be forgotten. The battle of the languages was in reality a battle for government jobs." Unemployment among [the majority] Sinhala youth generated considerable political pressure for the government to act in a manner that ironically consolidated identity based on nation, despite the economic antecedents to such identity formation. Although the Sinhala Only Act was partially repealed in 1959, it did not stop Tamils leaving Sri Lanka searching for better employment opportunities.

== After 1983 ==
The eruption of the civil conflict in Sri Lanka between the Sri Lankan government and the Liberation Tigers of Tamil Eelam saw mass migration of Tamils to escape the hardships and bitter life of a country torn at war. (See also Black July.)

Initially, it was professionals such as doctors and engineers who emigrated. This was followed by the poorer segments of the community who sold everything they had to be able to get a passport and ticket and seek asylum in foreign lands. The bitter ethnic fighting in Sri Lanka had driven over 800,000 Sri Lankan Tamils from their homeland, forcing them to find refuge around the globe.

== Demographics ==
The majority of Sri Lankan Tamils immigrated to western countries in the troubled period following the start of the Civil War, mainly towards countries in Western Europe and the Commonwealth Realms. These people were either entered mainly on family reunion visas, student visas (i.e. UK), or asylum seeking visas.

The first generation were more middle class in the Anglophone countries due to the English-speaking educated class of Sri Lanka being able to educate themselves into English-language high-ranking jobs, while the second generation throughout the western world have progressive social mobility.

The community is made up of prominent politicians, celebrities, activists, scholars, among other people, but lacks strong impact due to its small size.

=== Americas ===
The majority of Sri Lankan Tamils in this region reside in North America. The Greater Toronto Area has the highest population of Sri Lankan Tamils but smaller populations can be found in the urban areas of Montreal, Ottawa, Calgary, Edmonton, Vancouver, New York, Boston, Chicago and Los Angeles.

==== Canada ====
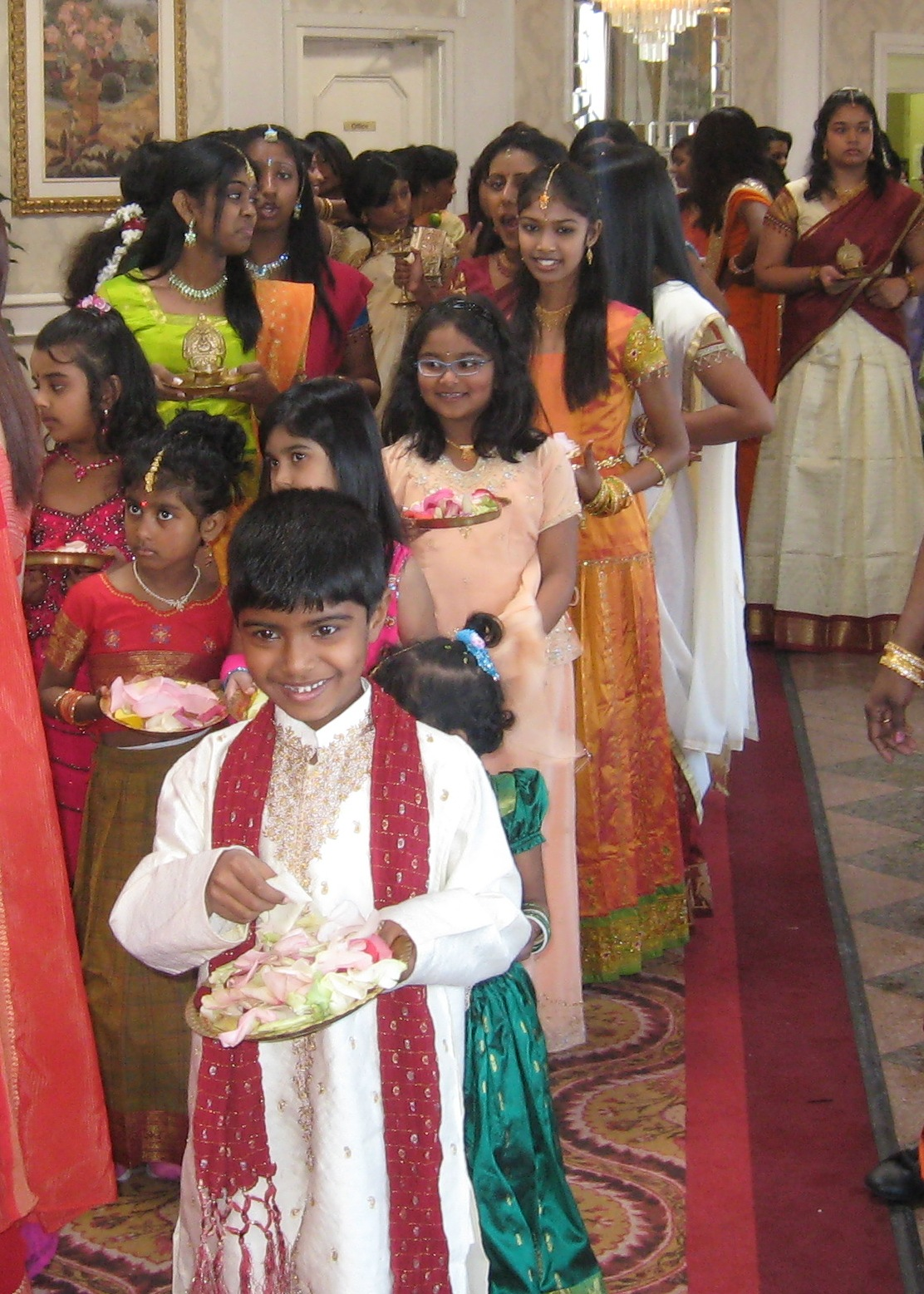
Expatriate Sri Lankan Tamil children in traditional clothes in Toronto

Canada has the largest population of Sri Lankan Tamils outside of South Asia. An approximate 150,000 people identified as "Tamil" according to the most recent census of both Statistics Canada and the OECD (dated 2011).

The Greater Toronto Area (GTA) has the largest concentration of Sri Lankans (mainly Tamils) in Canada. Canadians of Tamil ethnic origins mostly from Sri Lanka and other countries such as India, Malaysia, South Africa, Guyana, Trinidad and Tobago and Fiji. From a population of fewer than 2,000 Tamils in 1983, it has become an important minority population groups within the GTA. More than 25,000 were added between 1984 and 1992; in the 1991 census, Tamils were the fastest-growing ethnic group in Metropolitan Toronto.

The Tamils of Toronto and the rest of Canada are well versed and many own businesses, such as stores, supermarkets, restaurants, and even other franchise restaurants. They also tend to be highly educated and many work as real estate agents, lawyers, doctors and bankers. The Tamil peoples biggest population consists of the younger Tamil generations of the ages of 14 to 28, with most of them being students.

==== United States ====
Sri Lankan Tamils are predominantly found in the New York City boroughs of Staten Island and Queens, as well as in New Jersey and on Long Island in the New York metropolitan area. It was historically home to a number of middle class Sri Lankans, but these people were joined by people fleeing from Sri Lanka after the onset of the Civil War. An estimated 40% of Sri Lankan Americans are Sri Lankan Tamils. Around 3/4 of the community are foreign-born.

Sri Lankan Americans are highly educated and most have advanced into higher education. The average educational attainment rate for American Sri Lankans exceeds that of the average rate for Asian Americans overall. Around 60% had at least a bachelor's degree and the community had the second highest income of any Asian ethnicity (after Asian Indian).

=== Europe ===
The spread of immigration into Europe has not been concentrated to one particular country but rather encompassing all of Western Europe. The largest populations can be found in the United Kingdom and France, with it being entirely feasible that there are more who speak German as a first language (Germany and Switzerland) than English as a first language (UK and Ireland).

==== United Kingdom and Ireland ====
The British Isles has always had a strong, albeit small, population of Sri Lankan Tamils deriving from colonial era immigration between Sri Lanka and the UK, but a surge in emigration from Sri Lanka took place after 1983, as the civil war caused living conditions deteriorate and placed many inhabitants in danger. It is now estimated that the current population of British Sri Lankan Tamils numbers around 100,000 to 200,000.

They are found throughout the country, but are much more concentrated in the South East, with the largest population of British Sri Lankan Tamils found in London, chiefly in Harrow (North-West London), Redbridge (East London), and Tooting (South London). The community generally has lower birth rates in comparison to other South Asian ethnic groups.

Unlike immigrants to countries in Continental Europe, many Sri Lankan Tamils that went to live in Anglosaxon countries achieved entry through non-refugee methods such as educational visas and family reunion visas in addition to as refugees. Many of the children of the first generation are also more upwardly mobile compared to their parents. Many of the second generation are middle class, and English is considered by many young Tamils as their first language. Many of the second generation identified themselves as Hindu but may not actively participate in the faith, while the Christian Tamils are more active.

==== France ====
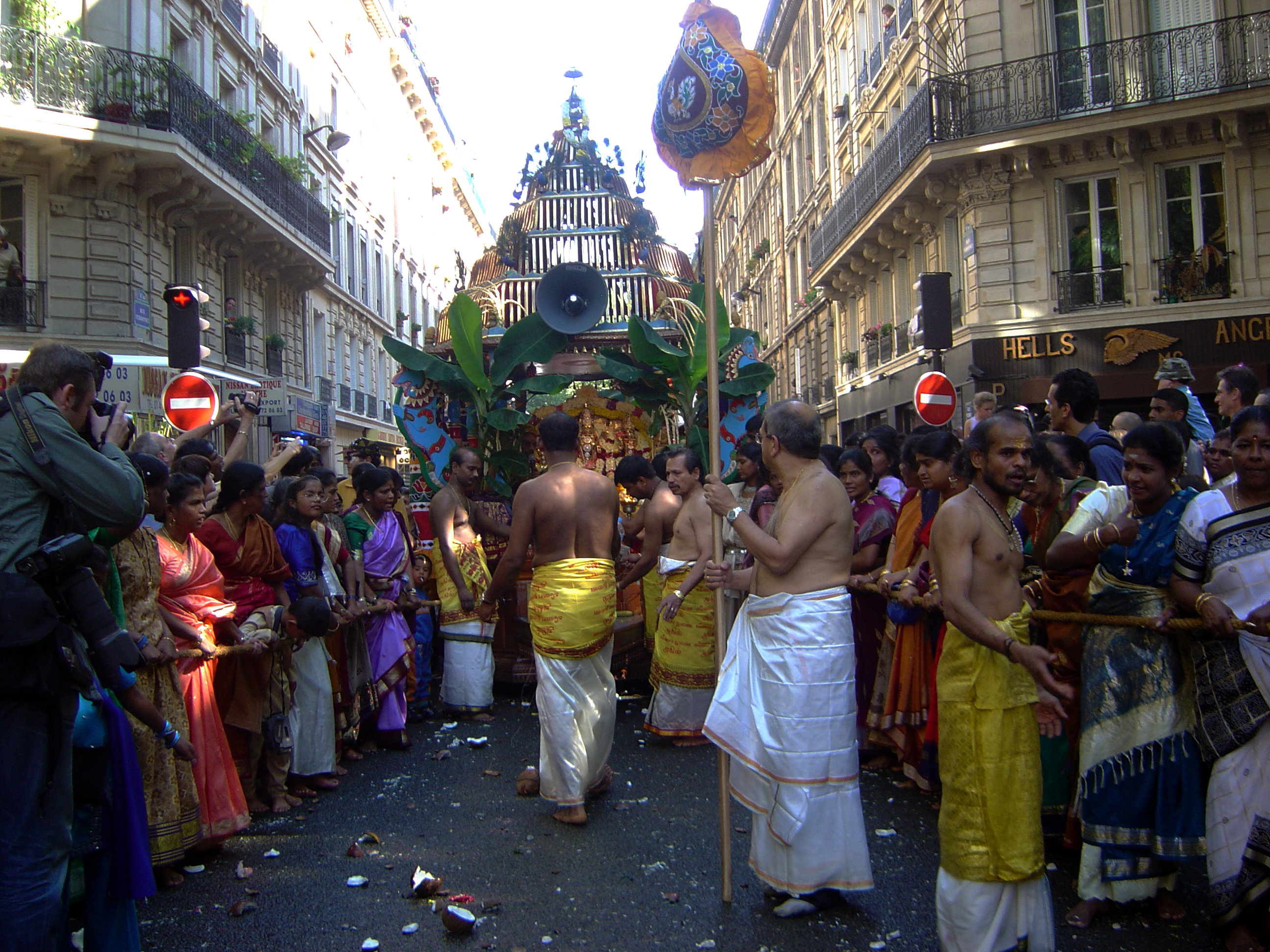
Celebrations of Ganesh by the Sri Lankan Tamil community in Paris, France

There are over 100,000 Sri Lankan Tamils living in France, joining an existing large population of Tamils from the French overseas departments.

In only 10 years, "Little Jaffna", located at the last stretch of the winding street of Rue du Faubourg Saint-Denis in the 10th arrondissement, between metros Gare du Nord and La Chapelle, has sprung to life and begun to truly flourish. It is commonly mistakenly called by the average Parisian as Little Bombay. [1]

The vast majority of Parisian Tamils fled Sri Lanka as refugees in the 1980s, escaping the violent civil conflict. The French Prefecture was initially quite reluctant about granting asylum to Tamils. In 1987, the Office for the Protection of Refugees (OFPRA) gained in power and opened up a period of nearly systematic asylum. This liberal period eventually tapered off in the 90s as a result of new European measures designed against an influx in immigration. As of 2013, there are over 100,000 Sri Lankan Tamils living in France, of which the greatest number live in Paris. Little Jaffna is also famous for the annual chariot procession held during Ganesha Chathurthi. Both the area and event have become popular tourist attractions.

==== Italy ====
Italy is home to roughly 25,000 to 35,000 Tamils, most of whom are migrants and refugees from Sri Lanka, as well as significant Tamil populations from Mauritius and India.

The largest center of Tamils in Italy is the Sicilian capital of Palermo, where Sri Lankan Tamils number around 6,000 and are the second largest immigrant group in Palermo after Bangladeshis. Other Italian cities with a significant Sri Lankan Tamil community are Rome, Milan, Bologna and Naples; there are even Tamil associations in smaller and medium-sized cities such as Catania, Reggio Emilia, and Lecce.

==== Switzerland, Austria and Germany ====
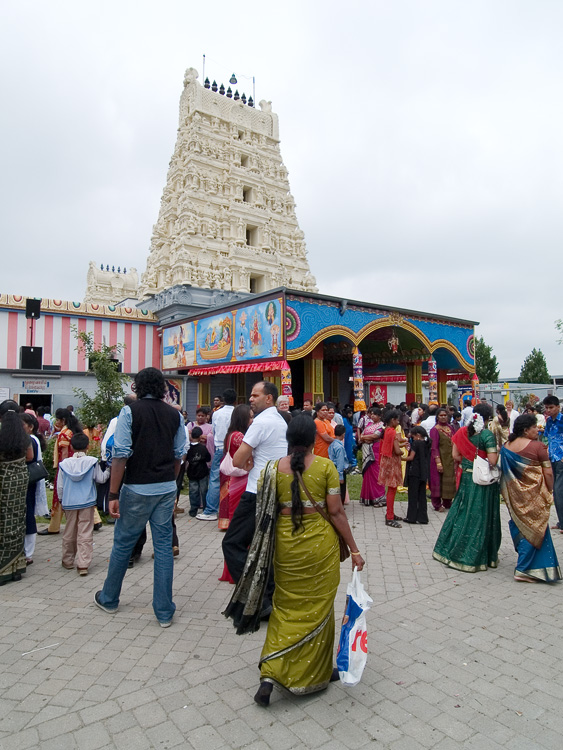
Sri Kamadchi Ampal temple in Hamm, North Rhine-Westphalia

The majority of Sri Lankan Tamils in this region are descended from asylum seekers flees in the Civil War.

The majority of the first generation had to learn the local language in order to be able to obtain jobs and suffered from poor employment prospects as a result, but the second generation has been more successful in picking up the local language (predominantly German) and educating their way into middle class jobs such as finance.

Religious fervor among Tamil Germans intensified as their numbers swelled. Due to the inspirational encouragement of Hawaii Subramaniaswami – the disciple of Yoga Swamigal – two well organized Hindu temples – Sidhivinayagar Kovil and the kamadchi Amman Kovil –have in place in the city of Hamm since 1984. According to the journal Hinduism Today, the youth are being well trained in their religion and culture at home and in weekend schools in rented halls using texts from Sri Lanka. They even wear Hindu symbols of Vibuthi and Tilakam.

Switzerland has about 60,000 Tamils, the majority of whom are from Sri Lanka who have gone as refugees. Temples, cultural festivals, international conferences, seminars and meetings draw a large number of the Tamil Diaspora from other European countries to the various Swiss cities, so much so that it has become the nerve centre of Tamil cultural activism. Tamil language classes, dance and music classes run by voluntary bodies are fast increasing. A large community established in Zurich with a place known as little Jaffna. Kanton Basel, Bern. Geneva. Most of the Tamils reside in the German speaking areas of Switzerland.

==== Benelux ====
The Netherlands has more than 20,000 Tamils, the majority of whom are refugees from Sri Lanka.

==== Scandinavia ====
Norway has about 13,000 Tamils(before 2010's), most of whom are Sri Lankan refugees. Around 7,000 live in the capital Oslo.

Sweden has a Sri Lankan Tamil population of approximately 6,000. The Sri Vinayagar temple was opened near Stockholm by Tamil Hindus in 2000.

Denmark has over 7,000 Tamils, the majority being refugees. There are two well-patronized Hindu temples – one for Vinayagar and another for Abhirami – and the Tamil population has become well adapted to the Danish environment.

=== Middle East ===
The Middle East has not benefited from the immigration of Sri Lankan Tamils on a large scale due to lack of valuable jobs and poor asylum seeking facilitation, but a number of Sri Lankans are working in the GCC as laborers and Sri Lankan Tamils are highly likely to be among these laborers - even if they make up in insignificant proportion of these people.

=== South Asia ===
A sizable population of Sri Lankan Tamils can be found in India, particularly in the state of Tamil Nadu where the two peoples share a common language. While a prominent population of wealthy businessmen exists, they are mostly people who migrated to India and their descendants and mostly refugees from Sri Lanka because of the recently concluded Sri Lankan Civil War.

=== East Asia ===
The most prominent populations of Sri Lankan Tamils can be found in Malaysia and Singapore where a large number of Indian Tamils exist.

=== Oceania ===
A large number of Sri Lankan Tamils are residing in Australia and New Zealand.

==== Australia ====
Among the first Sri Lankan immigrants to Australia were those recruited to work on the cane plantations of northern Queensland in the late 19th century. There are also reports of Sri Lankan workers in the gold-mining regions of New South Wales and the pearling industry in Broome, Western Australia. Estimates of numbers during this time range from 500 to 1,000 persons; the 1901 Australian Census recorded 609 Sri Lanka-born.

There was no significant migration from Sri Lanka before 1948, when the country gained independence from Britain. When the Sinhalese began to assert the power of their majority, however, many Burghers or English-speakers of Sri Lankan - European descent and Tamils began to migrate to other countries.

Following implementation of the Immigration Restriction Act 1901, which introduced policies excluding non-Europeans from entry to Australia, those of non-European appearance were precluded from entry. Thus the Burghers alone were allowed to enter Australia.

In the early 1970s, the restrictions on entry of non-Europeans were eased and a new wave of Tamils, Sinhalese and Burghers entered the country. Between 1961 and 1971, the Sri Lanka-born population rose from 3,433 to 9,091 and again to 22,516 by the time of the 1986 Census.

In the period of 1986 - 1996, the Sri Lanka-born community in Australia has doubled in size. The upsurge of migration from Sri Lanka has resulted from the continuing conflict between Tamil separatists and the Sri Lankan Government. The number of humanitarian entrants has increased since the introduction in January 1995 of the Special Assistance Category (SAC) Class 215 for Sri Lankans. The most recent wave of migrants to Australia includes Sinhalese Buddhists and Tamil Hindus who have strong cultural and political consciousness. Since 1991, there has also seen significant migration from Sri Lanka under the Family Migration, Onshore Protection, and Skilled Migration categories.

Census 2006 recorded a Sri Lankan population in Australia at 70,908. Census estimated the people who use Tamil at home as 32,700 and who use Sinhalese at home as 29,055. Sydney has 53,000 Indians and 18,000 Sri Lankans.

Census 2001 recorded 53,610 Sri Lanka-born persons in Australia, an increase of 14 per cent from 1996. The 2001 distribution by State and Territory showed Victoria had the largest number with 26,670 followed by New South Wales (16,910), Queensland (3,990) and Western Australia (2,970).

In 2001, of Sri Lanka-born people aged 15 years and over, 57.1 per cent held some form of educational or occupational qualification compared with 46.2 per cent for all Australians. Among the Sri Lanka born, 37.2 per cent had higher qualifications and 10.3 per cent had certificate level qualifications. Of the Sri Lanka-born with no qualifications, 24.9 per cent were still attending an educational institution.

Among Sri Lanka-born people aged 15 years and over, the participation rate in the labour force was 67.5 per cent and the unemployment rate was 7.9 per cent. The corresponding rates in the total Australian population were 63.0 and 7.4 per cent respectively. Of the 30,500 Sri Lanka-born who were employed, 51.7 per cent were employed in a Skilled occupation, 30.8 per cent in Semi-Skilled and 17.4 per cent in Unskilled. The corresponding rates in the total Australian population were 52.6, 28.9 and 18.6 per cent respectively.

==== New Zealand ====
===== Early days =====
Very few people came to New Zealand from Ceylon in the 1800s, but in the 1860s some gold seekers arrived. At the start of the 20th century there were only 106 Ceylon-born residents.

===== Immigration waves =====
From the late 1960s immigrant numbers increased with New Zealand's need for skilled workers. In 1972, after Sri Lanka became independent, there were racial and economic troubles which caused many people to emigrate. In 1983, fleeing civil war, both Sinhalese and Tamil people arrived. Their numbers increased after 1987, when the conflict became more severe.

===== Community =====
In 2013 there were over 9,500 Sri Lankan residents. Many are well-educated professional workers who live mostly in Auckland and Wellington. With strong ties to their war-torn homeland, the community has several ethnic associations.

Seeking peace and safety in New Zealand, Sri Lankans are of many faiths: Buddhist, Hindu, Muslim and Christian. Having left so much behind, they keep a sense of identity through their religion.

== See also ==
- Tamil diaspora
- Sri Lankan Tamils of India
- Malaysian Ceylonese Congress (MCC)
- Indians in Singapore
- List of Sri Lankan Tamils
- List of loan words in Sri Lankan Tamil
- Sri Lankan Tamils in Indian cinema
