= Thombo =

The Thombo or Tombo (Tamil: தோம்பு, Sinhala: තෝම්බු) was a land registry compiled by the Portuguese to provide a detailed statement of property ownership and tax obligations in Portuguese Ceylon. First compiled in 1615, they are still sometimes used to settle land disputes. There were three categories of Thombo during Dutch Ceylon timeline:

- Land Thombo
- Family Thombo
- School Thombo

== See also ==
- List of loanwords in Sri Lankan Tamil
- Maral (tax)
