= Weerodara =

Sri Lankan flagship stationary brand

Logo of Weerodara

Weerodara is a Sri Lankan flagship stationery brand of Weerodara Stationery (Pvt) Ltd. Weerodara is a manufacturer of exercise books. It is regarded as one of the prominent stationery brands in Sri Lanka. Weerodara was hailed as a market leader in Sri Lanka in the paper stationery industry for a reasonable period of time.

== Corporate history ==
Dhanapala Ranaweera founded Weerodara Stationery (Pvt) Ltd. in 1948. He set the foundation for Weerodara by choosing a location near a boutique in Pettah. After his family relocated from Mihiripanne to Nugegoda, Ranaweera began focusing on expanding his stationery shop. He began importing second-hand machinery from Germany and he made arrangements to install the imported machinery in a tiny hut that was situated near his house. After some time, Dhanapala Ranaweera stepped out of the Weerodara stationery business and he passed the baton to his sons Rohitha and Rohana, who took over the control of the business during the 1980's. Both Rohana and Rohitha stabilized the Weerodara factory by purchasing new machinery items. They also toured the UK and Germany to witness the printing machinery exhibitions, and they purchased technically advanced machinery equipment that was displayed at such exhibitions, which they brought to the Weerodara factory to expedite the production quality.

In June 2013, Weerodara Stationery (Pvt) Ltd initiated a corporate social responsibility project titled Honda Pothak Ganna—Honda Wadakata Sahaya Wanna, with the aim of catering to the requirements of the SOS Children's Villages of Sri Lanka. Under the Honda Pothak Ganna—Honda Wadakata Sahaya Wanna initiative, Weeradora vowed to support the education of children living in the villages across Sri Lanka by donating a portion of the sales proceeds generated from the sale of specially manufactured Weerodara brand exercise notebooks with an attribute of the SOS Children's Villages logo.

The company had undergone financial constraints on numerous occasions, similar to other stationery brands, due to changes in government policies over taxation. Weerodara had been at the receiving end whenever the governments in Sri Lanka during the past years had implemented import tariffs, resulting in ripple effects culminating in a sharp rise in the prices of imported raw materials. Weerodara had actively engaged in cross-selling strategies by installing stationery stalls to sell their branded stationery products for discounted prices at exhibitions and book fairs which also includes the Colombo International Book Fair.
