= Loanwords in Sri Lankan Tamil =

Loan words in Sri Lankan Tamil came about mostly due contact between colonial powers and the native population. Linguists study a language's lexicon for a number of reasons. Languages such as Tamil with centuries of literature and multi-cultural contact offer the chance to compare the various processes of lexical change. The words of foreign origin or loanwords illustrate those processes: calques, loanwords, the distinction between function words and content words.

Note: For information on the transcription used, see National Library at Calcutta romanization and Tamil script.

== European contribution ==
Sri Lankan Tamil dialects are distinct from the Tamil dialects used in Tamil Nadu, India. They are used in Sri Lanka and in the Sri Lankan Tamil diaspora. Linguistic borrowings from European colonizers such as the Portuguese, English and the Dutch have also contributed to a unique vocabulary that is distinct from the colloquial usage of Tamil in the Indian mainland. Furthermore, a form of Tamil spoken exclusively by Sri Lankan Moors has been strongly influenced by Arabic. Words that are peculiar to Sri Lankan Tamil dialects are marked with an asterisk (*).

=== Portuguese ===
Most Portuguese loan words are for items the native population lacked when the encounter happened c. 1505. Some are administrative terms, others are personal usage terms as well as items directly introduced from South America via the Portuguese traders. Most of these words are also shared with Sinhalese language users.

Word	Meaning	Original form
alumāri	cupboard	armário
annāsi	pineapple	ananás
alavangu	iron lever	alavanca
alupunethi	safety pin	alfinete
alugosu	executioner	algoz
baila	dance	baile or bailar
chuppu	suck	chupar or chupo
rothai	wheel	roda
savei	key	chave
jaṉṉal	window	janela
kathirai	chair	cadeira
kaju	cashew	caju
kalusan*	trousers	calção
kamicai*	shirt	camisa
kaṭatāsi*	paper	carta
koiappalam	guava	goiaba
kōppai	drinking glass	copo
kusini*	kitchen	cozinha
mēcai	table	mesa
pān*	bread	pão
pappāḷi/papā paḻam	papaya	papaia
pēnā	pen	pena (old type)
piṅkāṉ*	plate	palangana
pīppa	wooden cask, barrel	pipa
sapāttu	shoe	sapato
selvam	wood	silva
thavaranai	tavern	taverna
tācci*	metal pan	tacho
tompu*	title	tombo
tuvāy*	towel	toalha
vaṅki	bench	banco
veethuru	glass	vidro
veranta	verandah	varanda
viskottu	biscuit	biscoito

=== Dutch ===
Word	Meaning	Original form
kakkūs	Toilet	kakhuis
kāmara* (rarely used)	Room	kamer
kantōr*	Office	kantoor
Thapal	Post	Tapal
kokkis	Cookies	koekjes
piaskōpu (rarely used)	Cinema	bioscoop
tē(ttaṇṇīr)*	Tea	thee

=== English ===
Sri Lankan Tamil dialects use countless number of English words; following are some of the unique ones.

Word	Meaning	Original form
kōfii*	Coffee	coffee
pattīx*	A kind of fried potato snack	patties
Piḷavus	Worn with Sari	blouse
rōlls*	A kind of fried meat snack	rolls
Iṭākuttar*	Doctor	doctor

=== Civil conflict terminology ===
Black July induced civil conflict has introduced number of English and international words to the native population.

Word	Meaning	Original form
Kilēmōr*	Land or aerial mine	Claymore
Eli*	Helicopter	Helicopter
Kapīr*	Bomber	Kfir Bomber
Cel*	Mortar or artillery shells	Shell

== Sinhalese ==
Loanwords from the neighbouring Indo-European of sinhala is extensively found in sri lankan tamil dialect as it has prolonged contanct with sinhala (the origin of sl tamils it self is sometimes connected with sinhalese intermixing with south indian tamils) . sameway there are many tamil loanwords in sinhala.

Word	Meaning	Original form
kirāma cēvakaṉ*	Village Leader	grāma sēvakayā
(mālu) panis*	(fish) buns	(mālu) banis
mahattayā*	Sir, mister	mahattayā
piratēciya sapā*	Council	pradeśiya sabhāva
gama	village	gama
vitānayar*	Village headman	vidāna (muhandirama)
Eḷavalu	vegetables	elavalu
Kēru	buffalo curd	kiri
Vitāṉai / Vitānayar	Village headman/ supervisor	Vidāna
Visai	crazy/erratic behavior(jaffna slang)	Pissu / Vissaya
Antirā	Meaningless chatter	Andara (අන්දර)
Avaccāriya	Permission	Avasāraya (අවසරය)
Vattai	Land plot / private garden estate	Vatta (වත්ත)

The integration of these terms highlights a unique linguistic convergence. In sectors like public transportation, domestic trade, and state infrastructure where Tamil and Sinhalese communities continually interface—the spoken language dynamically adopts phonetic variations of Sinhala words. This structural lexical borrowing occurs primarily to bypass complex classical Tamil equivalents in favor of mutually understood localized terms

== Malay ==
There are also a few words from the Malay language. Malay words for edible fruits were introduced during the colonial period by traders. The same terminology is shared with Sinhalese.

Word	Meaning	Original form
maṅkostīn*	Type of Fruit	Mangosteen
ramputan*	A type of fruit	Rambutan
rempa* (rarely used)	Curry mix	Rempa
totol *	A type of sweetmeat	dodol
tūriyan*	Type of Fruit	Durian
kaccān *	Peanuts	kacang

== Cited literature ==
- Halikowski Smith, Stefan (2011). Reinterpreting Indian Ocean Worlds. Cambridge Scholars Publishing. ISBN 978-144-38-30-447.
- Dalgado, Sebastiao Rodolfo (1988). Portuguese Vocables in Asiatic Languages. Asian Education Services. ISBN 978-81-20-604-131.
- Avram, A.A., 2013. The Dutch lexical contribution to three Asian Portuguese Creoles//Contribuição lexical do holandês para três crioulos de base portuguesa da Ásia. PAPIA-Revista Brasileira de Estudos do Contato Linguístico, 23(1), pp.51-74.
- Hoogervorst, T. (2018) ‘Sailors, Tailors, Cooks, and Crooks: On Loanwords and Neglected Lives in Indian Ocean Ports’, Itinerario, 42(3), pp. 516–548. doi:10.1017/S0165115318000645.
- Thananjayarajasingham, Sabaratnasingham, "Some Dutch Loan-words in the Jaffna Dialect of Tamil", Proceedings of the First International Conference Seminar of Tamil Studies - Volume Two : First International Conference Seminar of Tamil Studies, Kuala Lumpur, Malaysia, 16 - 23 April 1966. Edited by Thani Nayagam, Xavier S., International Association of Tamil Research, April 1969, 793-799.
- Suntharesan, V. "Impact of borrowings from English on Jaffna Tamil (a text book for University students)." Language In India, vol. 14, no. 6, June 2014, pp. 426
