= Brickfields, Kuala Lumpur =

Brickfields
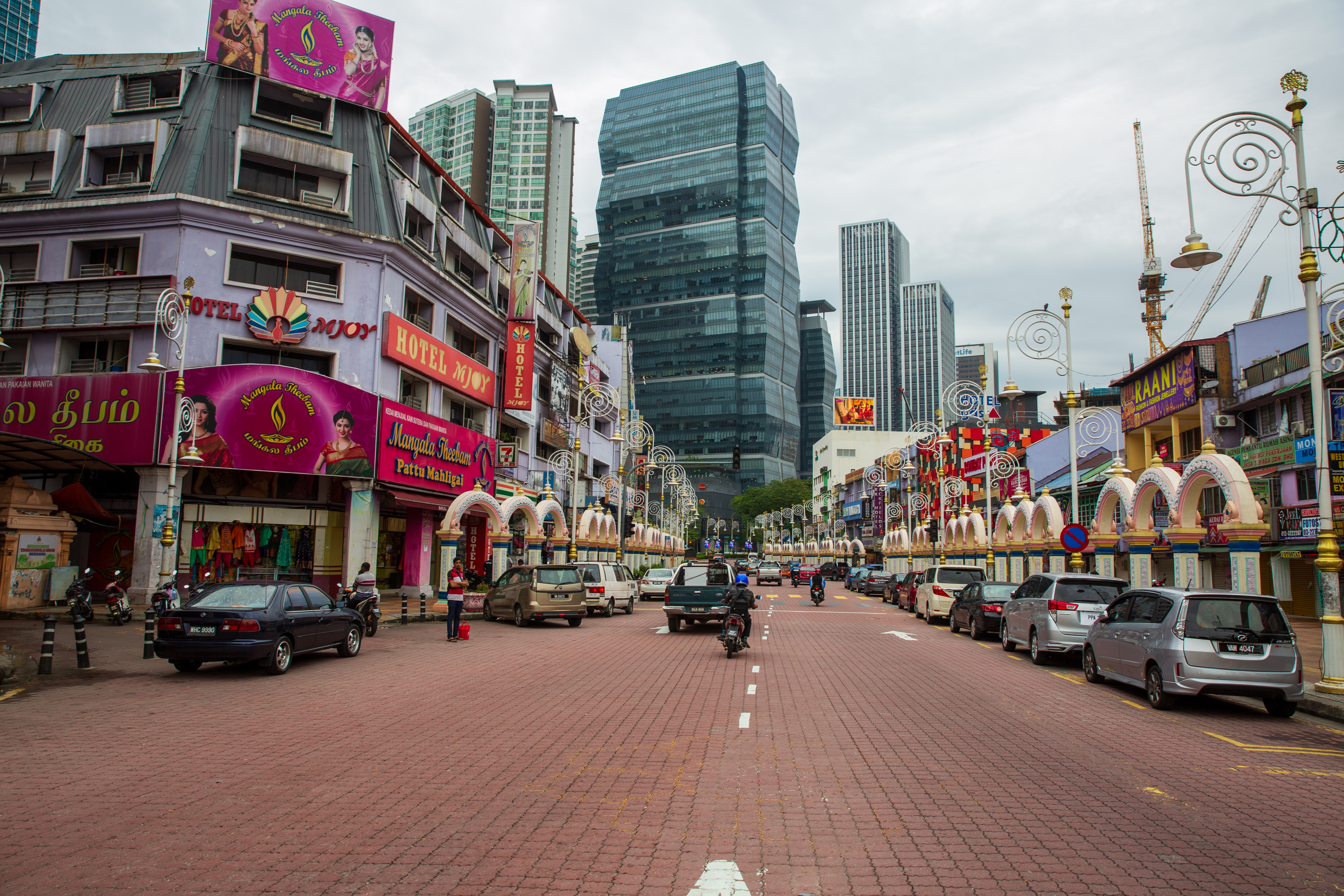
- Jalan Tun Sambanthan in Brickfields.

- Location within Malaysia
- Coordinates: 3°7′47″N 101°41′3″E
- Country: Malaysia
- Federal Territory: Kuala Lumpur
- Constituency: Bukit Bintang

Government
  - Local Authority: Dewan Bandaraya Kuala Lumpur
  - Mayor: Mhd Amin Nordin Abdul Aziz
- Time zone: UTC+8 (MST)
- Postcode: 50470
- Dialling code: +60 322
- Police: Travers, Brickfields
- Fire: Pantai, Central

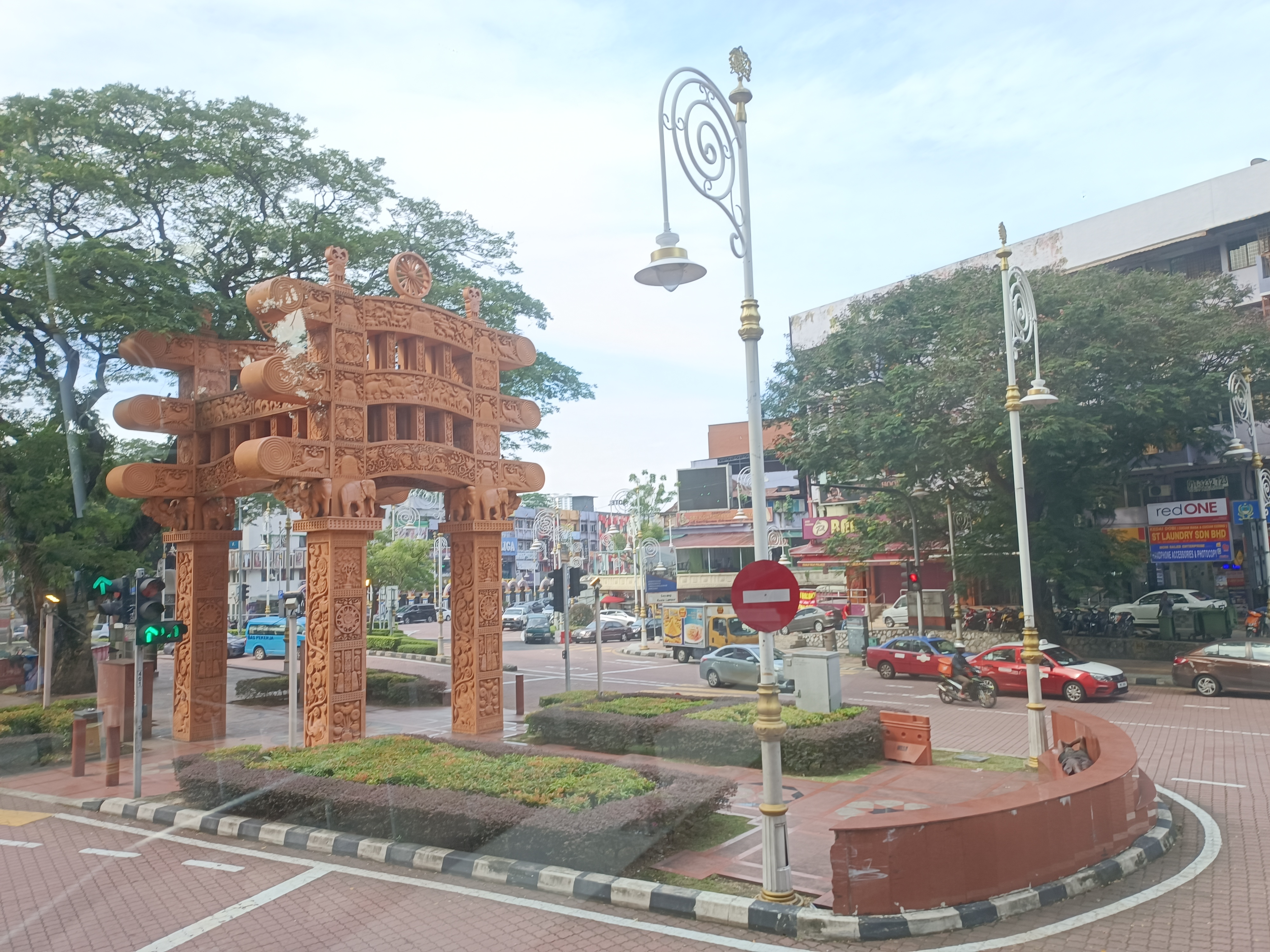
The Torana Gate in Brickfields

Brickfields is a neighbourhood (as well as an administrative zone) located on the western flank of central Kuala Lumpur, Malaysia. It is known as Kuala Lumpur's Little India due to the high percentage of Indian residents and businesses. Brickfields has been ranked third in Airbnb's list of top trending destinations.

Brickfields is notable for being home to KL Sentral, Kuala Lumpur's central public transportation hub.

== History ==
In 1881, a flood swept through Kuala Lumpur in the wake of a disastrous fire. These successive problems destroyed the town's structures of wood and atap (thatching). As a response, Frank Swettenham, the British Resident of Selangor, required that buildings be constructed of brick and tile. Hence, Kapitan Yap Ah Loy bought a sprawling piece of real estate, now Brickfields, for the setting up of a brick industry which would spur the rebuilding of Kuala Lumpur.

Later the area was developed by Yap Kwan Seng, the fifth and last Kapitan Cina of Kuala Lumpur. As a businessman, he foresaw an increased demand for bricks in fast-growing Kuala Lumpur and established a kiln in the district. The area soon became the centre for brick-making in the early days because the whole area was a clay pit and good quality bricks are made from clay. Therefore, Brickfields became synonymous with good quality bricks.

Brickfields also used to be the site of the main depot for Keretapi Tanah Melayu (KTM) (Malayan Railway) during the administration of the British. The British authorities brought in people from Sri Lanka to work the railway and the depot. Many lived in quarters around Brickfields. Since then, the Indian community have lived and remained here and became citizens of Malaysia. Some of the old quarters can still be found around Jalan Rozario. Today, the depot has been transformed into KL Sentral, the city's central railway hub.

Brickfields is one of the pioneer settlements in Kuala Lumpur. Indeed, the whole stretch of Jalan Tun Sambanthan (formerly Jalan Brickfields) is interspersed with old colonial structures.

== Lifestyle ==
=== Culture ===
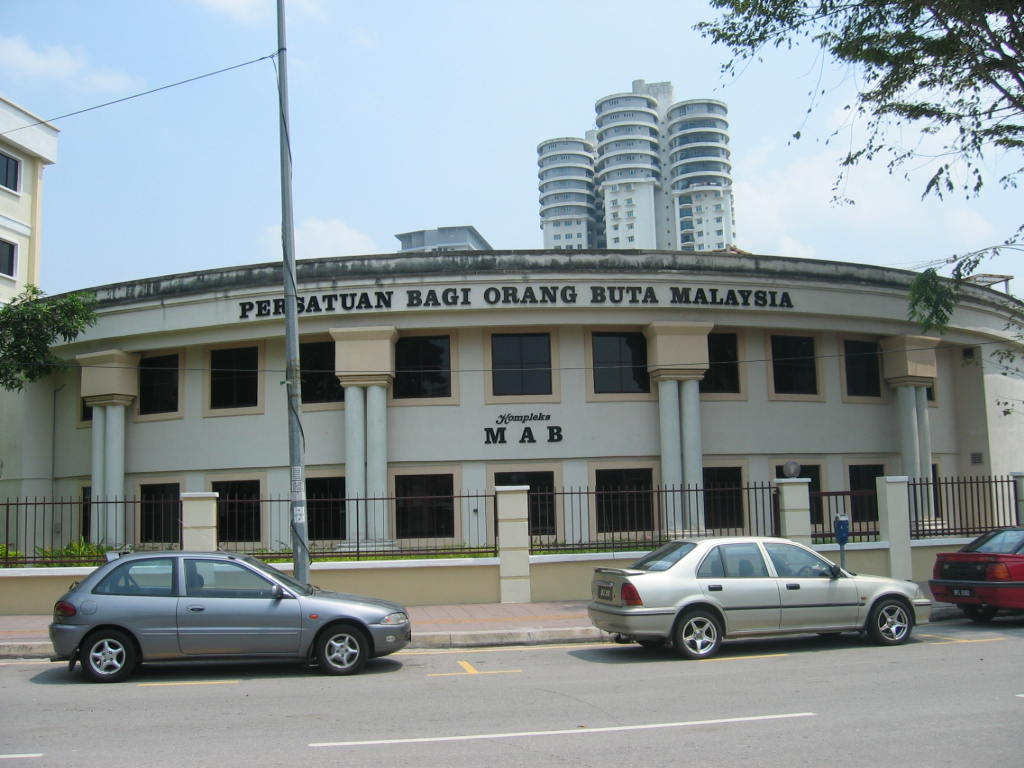
The headquarters of Malaysian Association for the Blind

Along Jalan Tun Sambanthan 4 is the century-old YMCA, which has become an integral landmark in Brickfields. Further down along Jalan Tun Sambanthan is the charming Vivekananda Ashramam built in the early 19th century.

Brickfields also houses historical government quarters built during the British era, which are under harm from rapid development. The 100 railway quarters in Jalan Rozario are still there, although modern buildings have cropped up all around. The "Hundred Quarters" are located at Jalan Chan Ah Tong. It was built in 1915 as terrace houses for junior servants. It is planned to be demolished for commercial development. As of June 2014, there have been no demolition works.

Brickfields is famous for its Indian food delights, especially the unique banana leaf rice and thosai (Indian pancake made from fermented rice flour).

The Malaysian Association for the Blind, located along Jalan Tebing, houses several blind people. They can be seen walking around Brickfields. Many have become familiar with the area, that they rarely encounter any problems walking around here. Most Brickfields has been equipped with tactile guided pathways designed to aid the blind in walking around the area.

The Temple of Fine Arts is located along Jalan Berhala. It is essentially a cultural organisation offering various courses relating to Southern Indian music, dance, and arts. It was founded in 1981 and has currently similar centres in Johor Bahru, Melaka, Penang, as well as centres around the world including India, Australia and Singapore. Besides offering courses, the organisation frequently organises Indian performances around Kuala Lumpur and has produced many artists progressing to international standards. They will be launching their state of art building soon, built upon the founding architecture of the old Temple of Fine Arts adjacent to the Maha Vihara Buddhist Temple. The new building will be a symbolic icon to the progress of arts and culture in Brickfields.

=== Places of worship ===
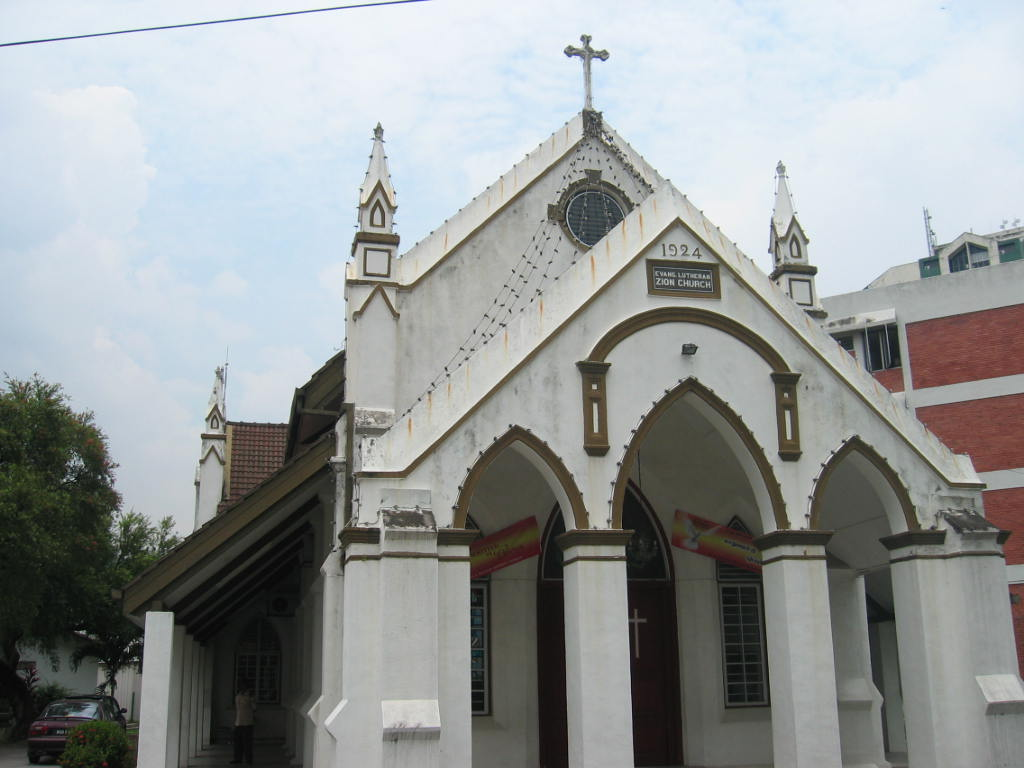
The Lutheran Zion Church in Brickfields, Kuala Lumpur, established in 1924.

Sri Kandaswamy Kovil on Jalan Scott

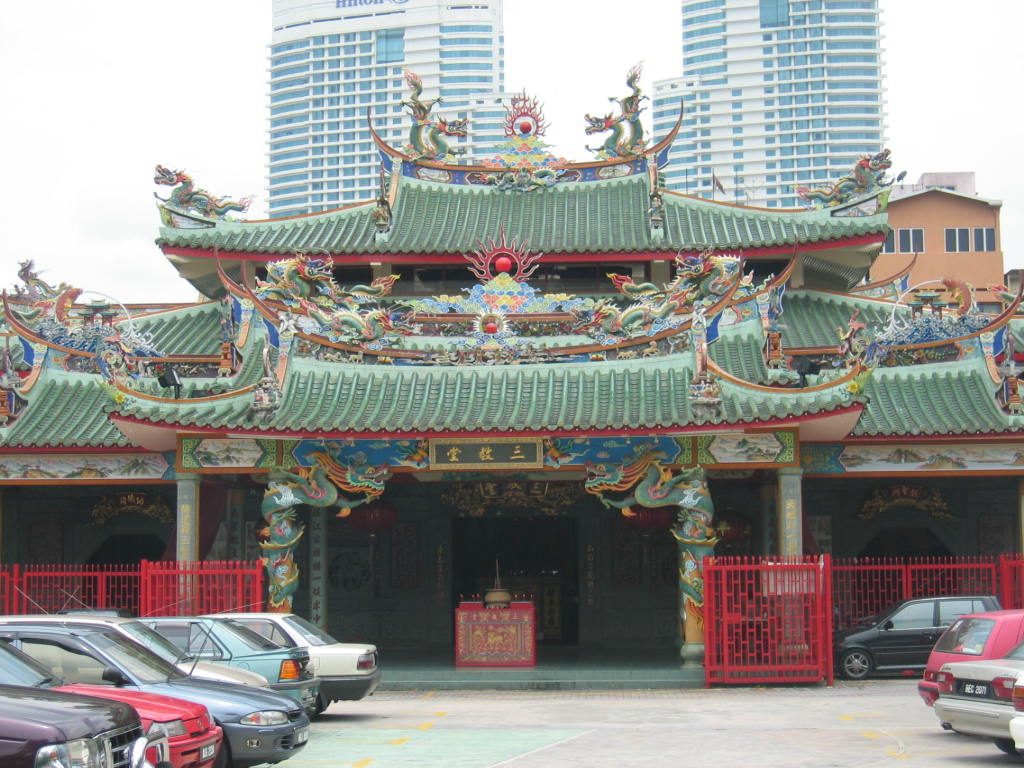
Three Teachings Chinese Temple on Jalan Thambipillay

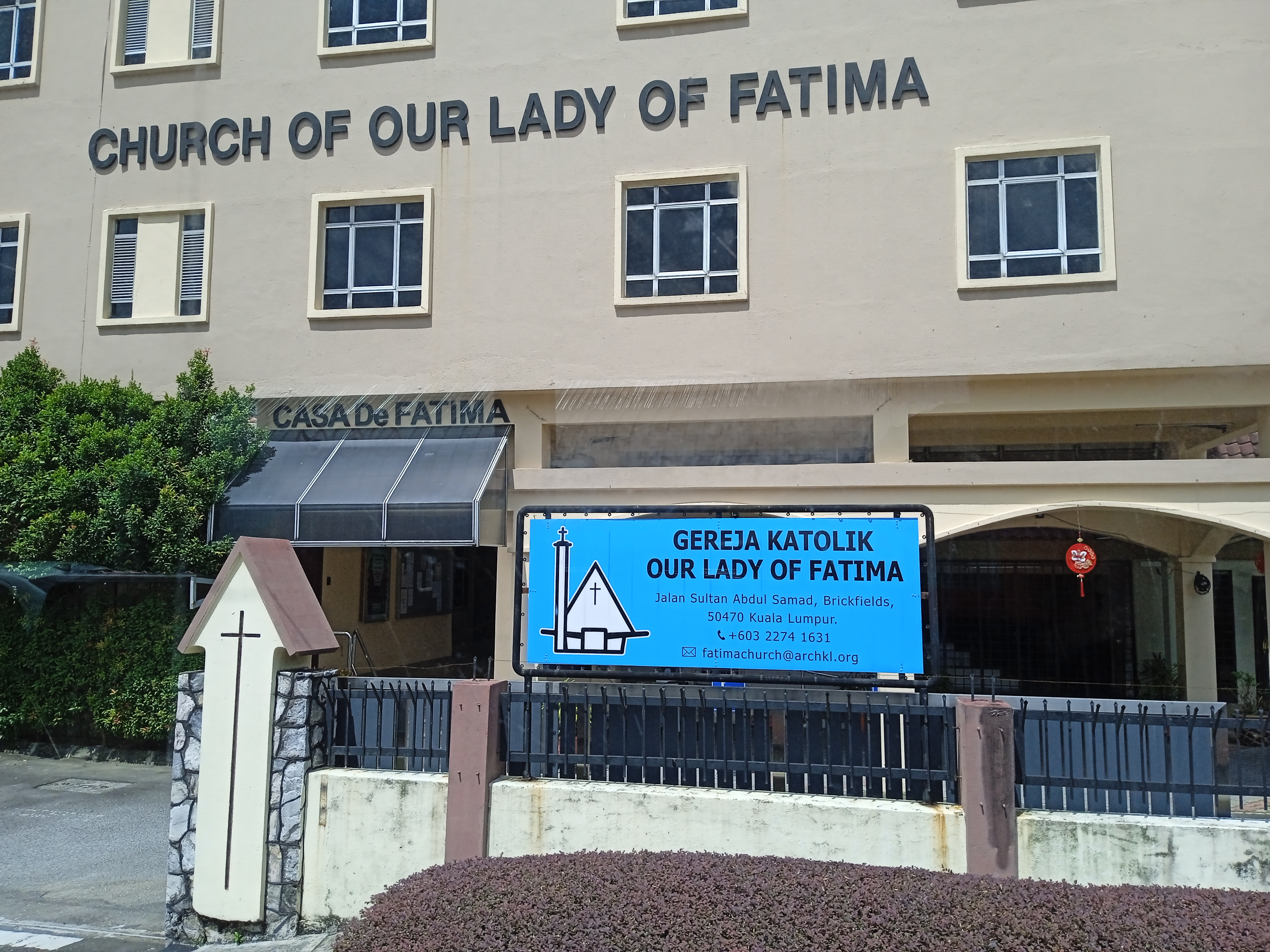
Our Lady of Fatima Church

Brickfields is also tagged as a "Divine Location" as many religious structures, some over 100 years old, are concentrated in the area, particularly Jalan Berhala. The aptly named road ("Berhala" means shrine) houses the Buddhist Maha Vihara and the Sri Sakthi Karpaga Vinayagar Temple.

Buddhist Maha Vihara was founded in 1894 by the Sasana Abhiwurdhi Wardhana Society, the oldest registered Buddhist Society Klang Valley. It has been managed by the Sinhalese Buddhist community and supported by the Chinese Buddhist and Indian Buddhist communities. The Wesak procession organised by the Buddhist Maha Vihara since the 1890s is the country's oldest and largest religious procession. The Wesak month-long celebrations attracted about 100,000 people every year.

The Sri Kandaswamy Temple is one of the most prominent Sri Lankan Tamil or Ceylonese Tamil temple located along with Jalan Scott. It is vast and showcases rich Tamil Architecture and has become a popular tourist attraction in Kuala Lumpur. This temple was built in 1902. They provide religious services such as house warming ceremonies and child 31st-day ceremonies. The Kalamandapam hall, which the 2nd Prime Minister of Malaysia officiated, holds wedding ceremonies and is also owned by this temple.

Both the Sri Kandaswamy Temple and Buddhist Maha Vihara stand testament to the influence of the Ceylonese in Brickfields, who was brought in to work on the Malayan Railways before World War II.

A sprinkling of churches of different denominations can also be found here. Among the larger churches in the area are the Holy Rosary Church (est. 1903), Our Lady of Fatima, and the Zion Lutheran Church. Most of which are located along Jalan Sultan Abdul Samad. There is also an Indian Orthodox Church called the St. Mary's Orthodox Syrian Cathedral in Jalan Tun Sambanthan Satu.

There is a Surau (small mosque) located on Jalan Sultan Abdul Samad called Madrasatul Gouthiyyah. Indian Muslims mainly attend this mosque, and the sermons are sometimes conducted in Tamil.

Finally, another significant landmark in Brickfields is the distinctive Chinese Temple known as Sam Kow Tong Temple (三教堂), which means "Hall of Three Teachings" along Jalan Thambillay. The Temple was founded in 1916 and belonged to the Heng Hua clan in Hokkien Province. There is also another Chinese Temple, Seng Hong Tokong (城隍庙) along Jalan Berhala.

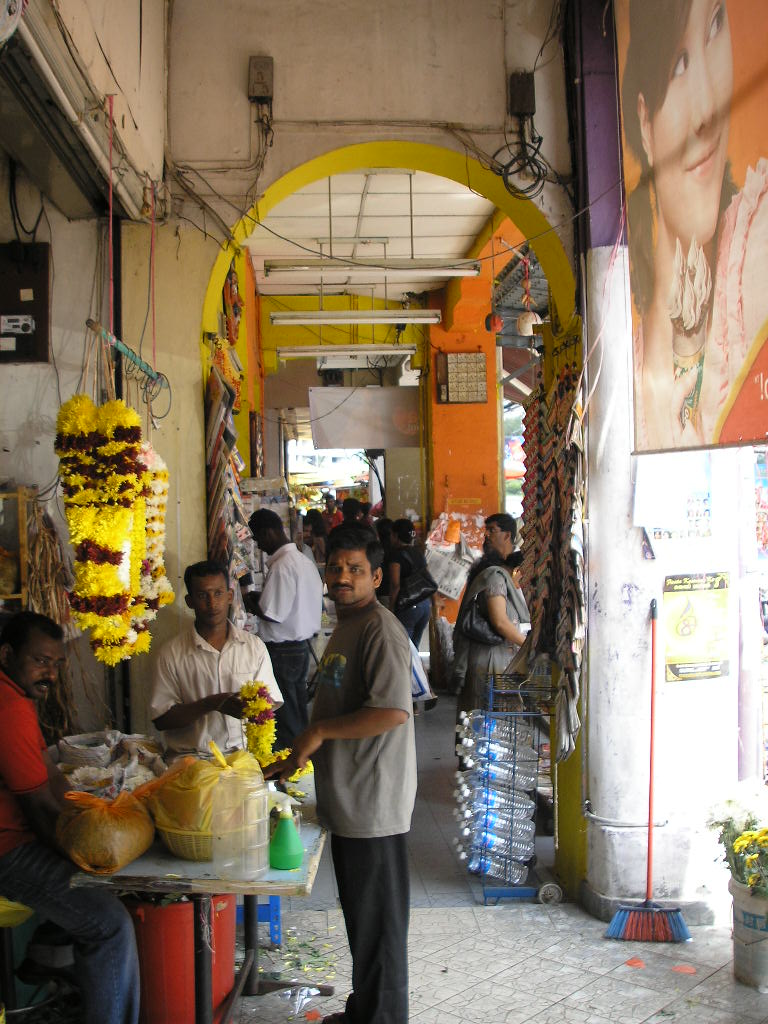
Shopkeepers in Brickfields

=== Trade ===
Being the Little India of Kuala Lumpur, it has numerous shops that Indian businessmen own. There are spice shops, grocery outlets, sweet and snacks shops, textile shops, goldsmiths, hotels, restaurants, food stalls, printers and even flower stalls.

The headquarters of Malaysian Institute of Accountants can be found along Jalan Tun Sambanthan 3, which also contains many second-tier audit firms scattered around. There are also plenty of law firms all over Brickfields area.

Another popular business is the printing and paper distribution business which is concentrated along Jalan Sultan Abdul Samad.

The new Sentral Brickfields 3-storey commercial complex is located next to the Sri Kandaswamy Temple, offering 22 exclusive retail outlets with free parking and easy access via the Jalan Istana road. The new Sonali business showroom is located in this building. The tagline for Sentral Brickfields is The Riverside Family Center in Little India https://web.archive.org/web/20130827091334/http://www.sentralbrickfields.asia/

== Infrastructure and facilities ==
=== Police station ===
The Brickfields police station closed end of 2010 and was temporarily relocated to Sri Petaling. The Brickfields District Police is one of the four police district headquarters in Kuala Lumpur. Its jurisdiction covers, among others, the area of Bangsar, Bukit Damansara, Taman Tun Dr Ismail, Taman Desa, Jalan Klang Lama, and Sri Petaling.

=== Schools ===
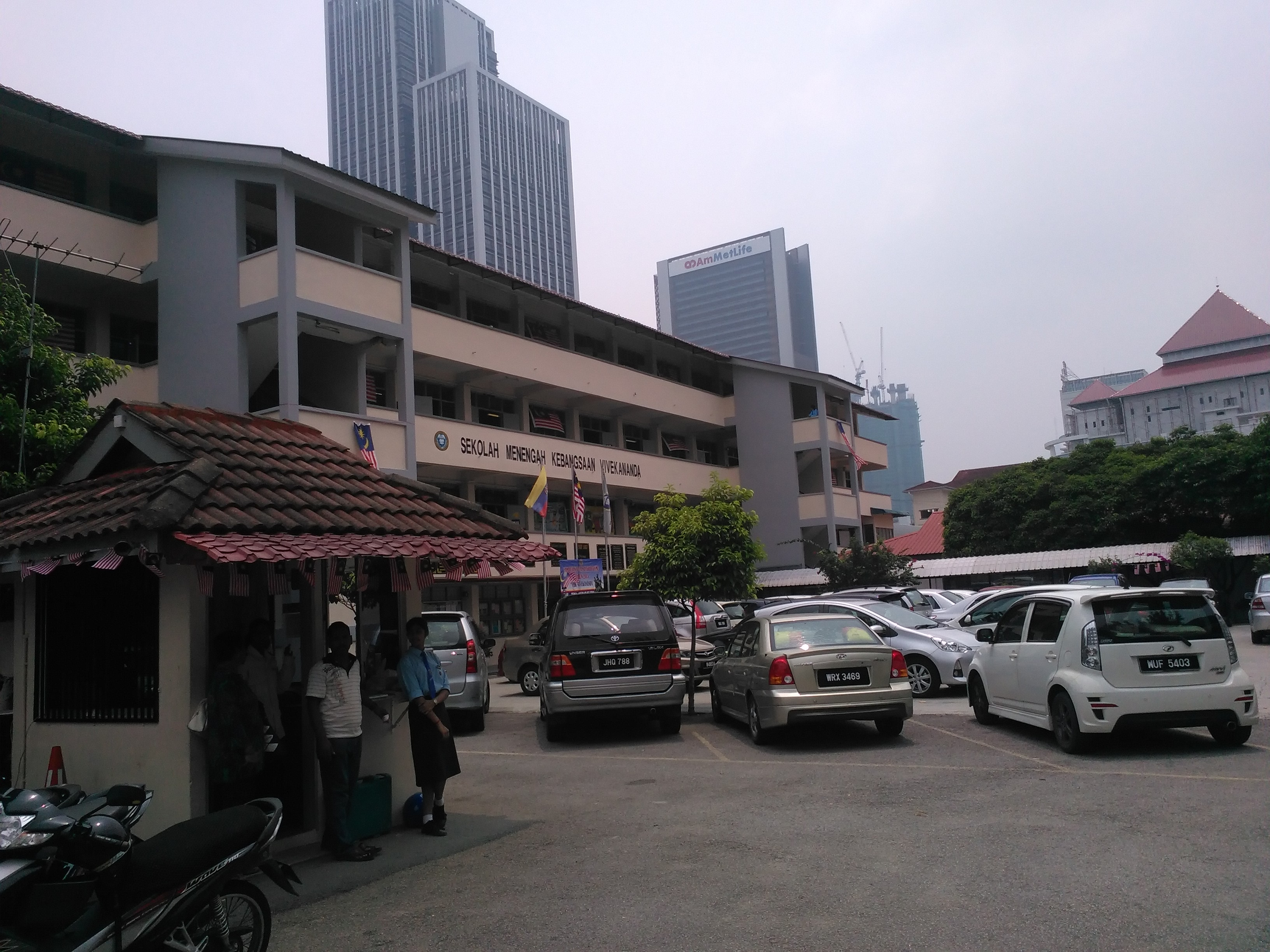
SMK Vivekananda, Brickfields

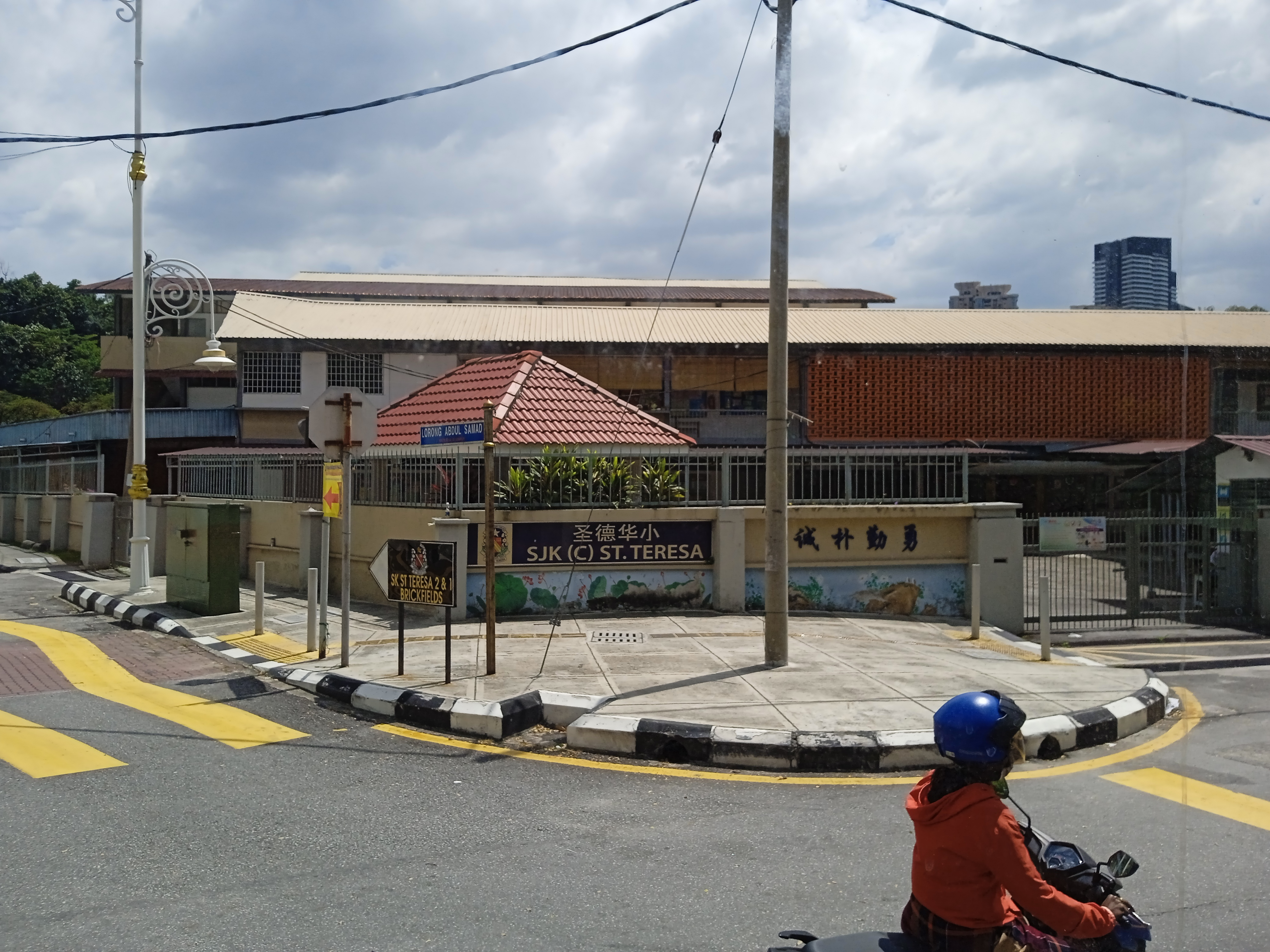
SJK(C) St. Teresa

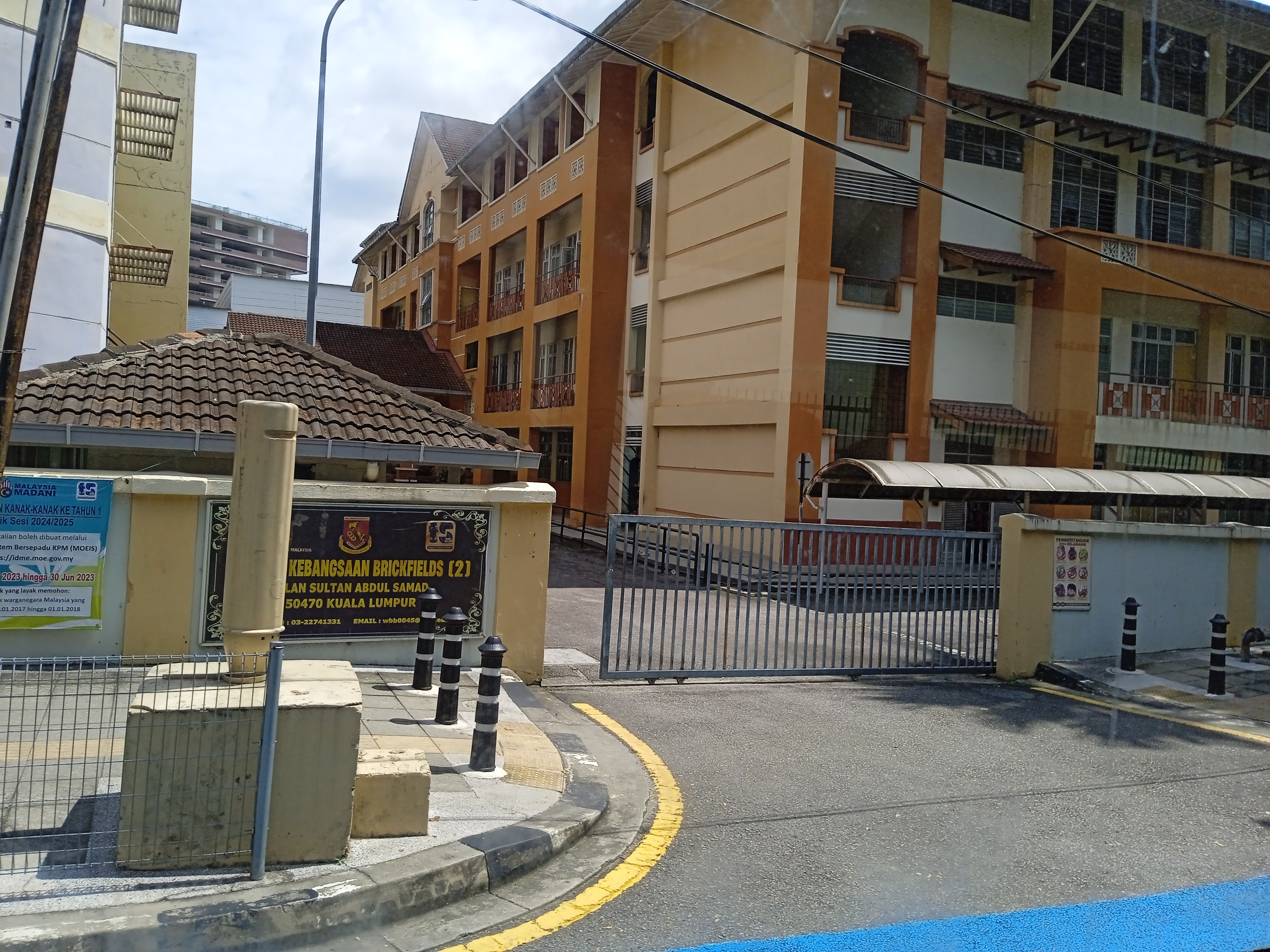
SK Brickfields 2

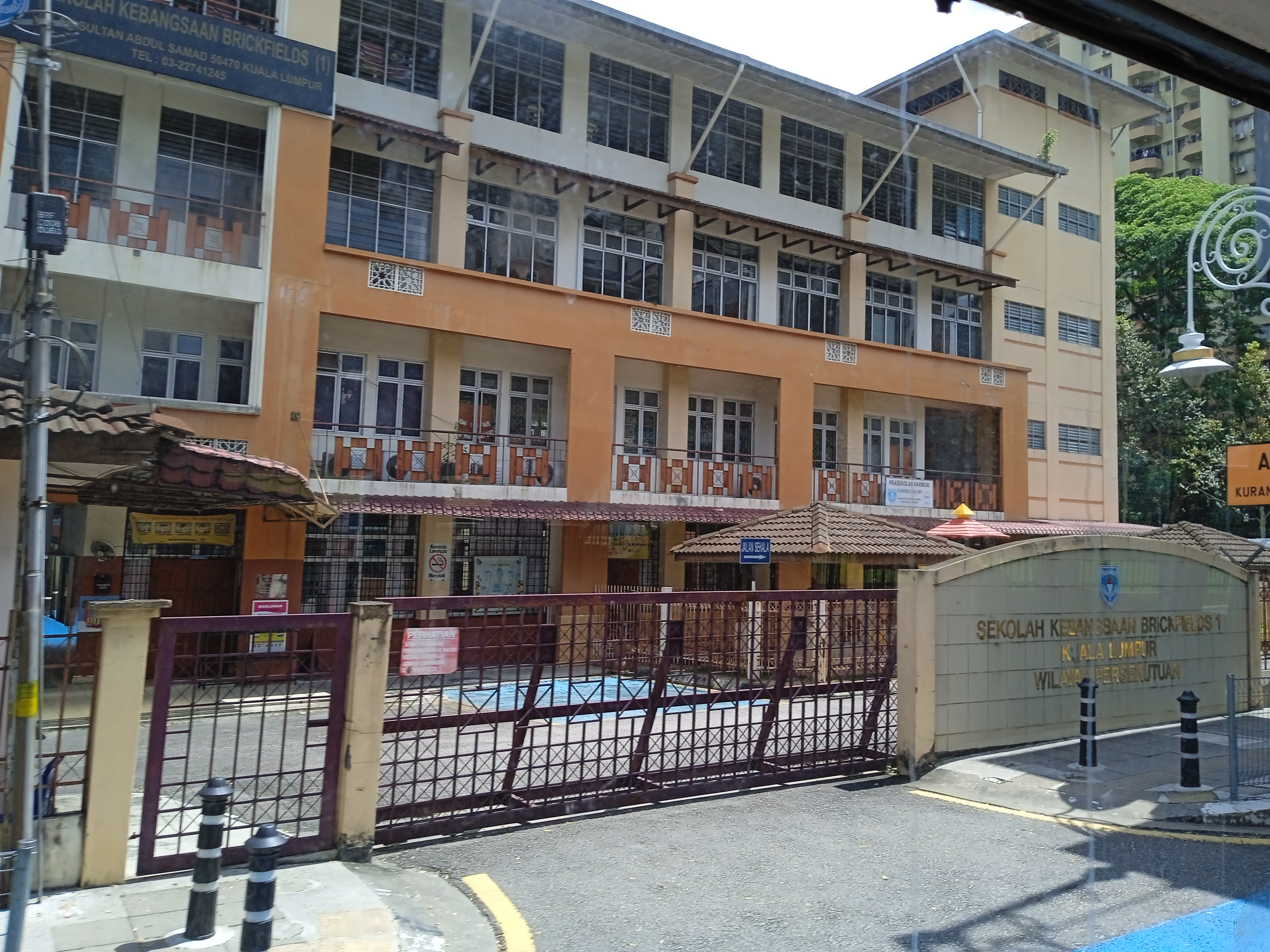
SK Brickfields 1

There are many schools located at Brickfields.

Secondary schools:

- SMK Vivekananda, Brickfields
- SMK La Salle School, Brickfields

Primary schools:

- SK La Salle Brickfields 1 & 2
- SK Brickfields 1
- SK Brickfields 2
- SK St. Theresa (1) & (2)
- Methodist Girls School 1
- SRJK (T) Vivekananda
- SRJK (C) St Theresa

Private schools:

- Global Indian International School, Kuala Lumpur
- Havil International School

Colleges:

- Brickfields Asia College
- Methodist College Kuala Lumpur

=== Cultural/social organisations ===
- YMCA
- Sasana Abhiwurdhi Wardhana Society - Sinhalese based organisation
- Temple of Fine Arts
- Malaysian Association of the Blind
- Rukun Tetangga Sektor Brickfields – A government base social body for Brickfields residents.
- The Society For Deaf in Selangor And Federal Territory – A civil rights organisation for deaf and hard of hearing individuals. Formed in 1975.
- Wei-Ling Gallery, Private Art Contemporary Gallery in Kuala Lumpur

== Development ==
Brickfields has evolved from a residential to a commercial extension of downtown Kuala Lumpur. The KL Sentral development project is one of Kuala Lumpur's most significant development projects encompassing an area of 290,000 square metres. It includes the KL Sentral transportation hub, two hotels, condominiums, shopping complexes, a clubhouse, office buildings, as well as a convention and entertainment centre. Much of it is built on the former Keretapi Tanah Melayu marshalling yard here in Brickfields. The overall project is expected to be completed in 2012.

The rapid evolvement has left parts of Brickfields suspended in time. One can find small village type housing amidst the high-rise modern living complexes being constructed. There have been efforts to clean up the area of Brickfields outside the KL Sentral development area. Recently Brickfields' image as a notorious area with a high incidence of crime is slowly disappearing. There are brothels and massage parlors in Jalan Hicks and Jalan Thambipillay where prostitutes ply their trade.

Another major development in Brickfields is the NU Sentral Shopping Center, Malaysia's first integrated lifestyle and retail hub located in the central business district of KL Sentral. The shopping center was launched and opened to public in March 2014.

== Transport ==
View of KL Sentral at dusk

Brickfields can be accessed through many ways:

- KL Monorail: Tun Sambanthan and KL Sentral stations
- Rapid KL's Kelana Jaya Line (LRT): KL Sentral-redONE station
- MRT Kajang Line: Muzium Negara station
- KTM Komuter: KL Sentral station
- Express Rail Link: KL Sentral station
- Rapid KL buses

The combination of the commercial activity, schools and residential traffic and Brickfields' location as one of the major access points into and out the city frequently results in bad traffic congestion in the mornings and evenings.

== Notable people ==
- Ananda Krishnan, one of Malaysia and South East Asia's richest men, grew up in Brickfields and studied at the Vivekananda Tamil school.
- Bastianpillai Paul Nicholas, Malaysia's first Asian banker.
- Lee Lee Lan, ballet dancer and choreographer
- Tan Sri Devaki Krishnan, the first Malaysian woman to stand for election.
