= Bastianpillai Paul Nicholas =

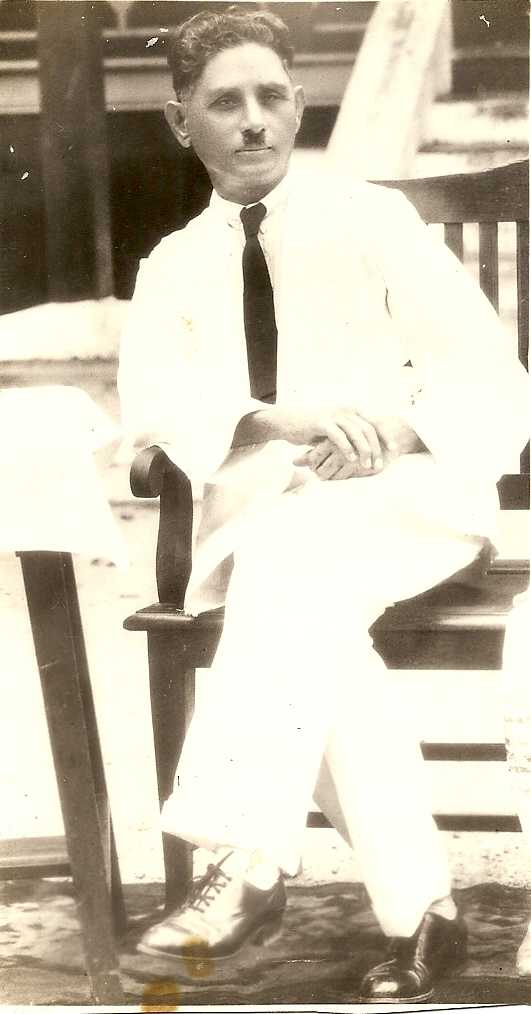

Bastianpillai Paul Nicholas also known as B.P. Nicholas was the founder of the Oriental Bank of Malaya and was the first Asian banker in British colonial history. He was also the only ethnic Ceylon Tamil ever to acquire a banking license in Malaya.

B. P. Nicholas commenced his first monetary business providing financial services with a close friend in Ipoh, Perak between the years 1918 and 1920. He is recognised as one of the first Asian bankers in the history of British Colonial Malaya.

== Leader from the Tamil community ==
Back then, the Indian community predominantly the Tamil people were involved in various agricultural, constructions and economical activities. Some took turns to evolve into business owners and conglomerates with assistance from family wealth.
