= Sri Kandaswamy Kovil, Brickfields =

Hindu temple in Kuala Lumpur, Malaysia

- Malay: Kuil Sri Kandaswamy; Tamil: கந்தசுவாமி கோவில்
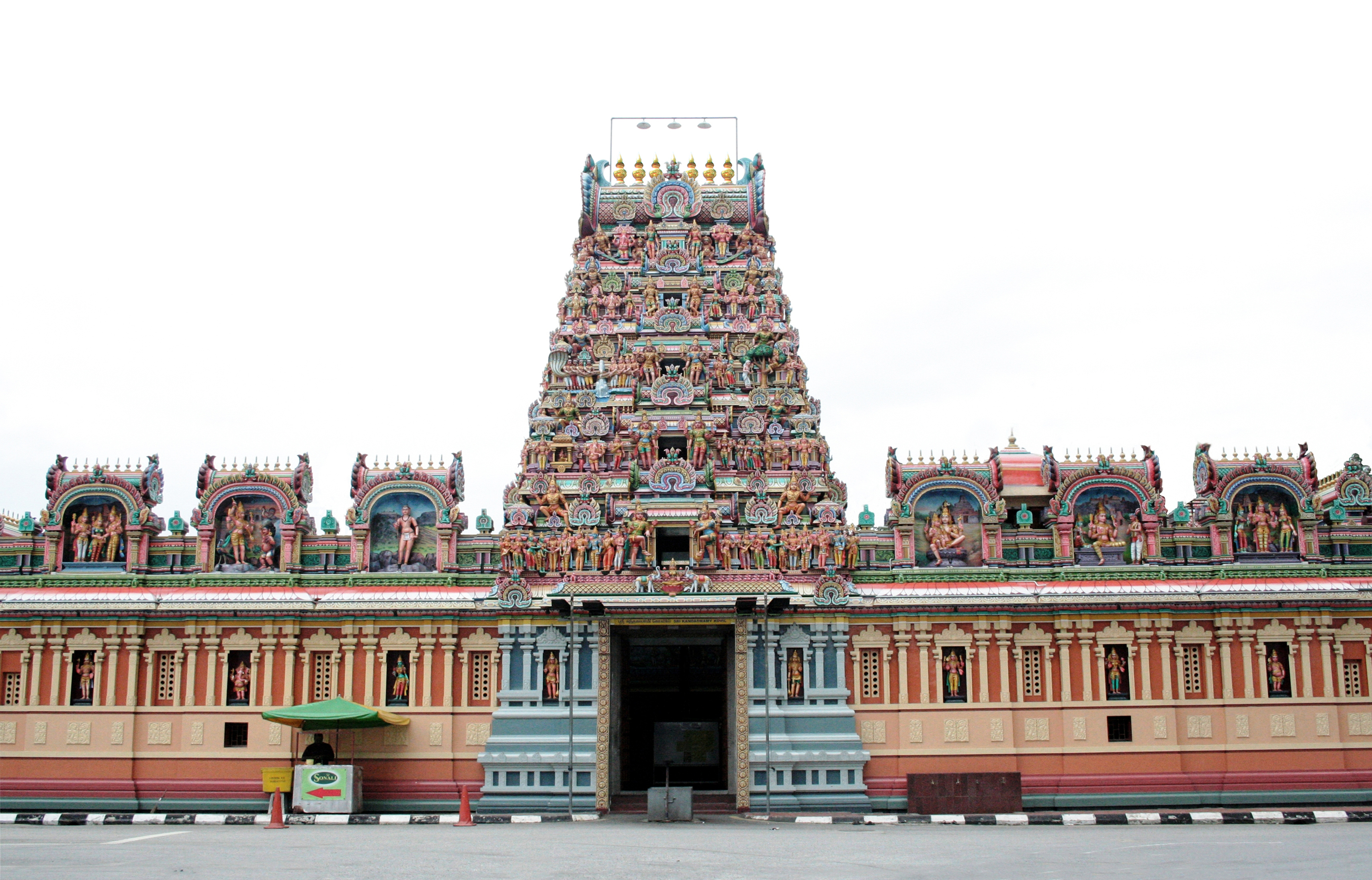

- Location in Malaysia

Religion
- Affiliation: Hinduism
- Deity: Murugan

Location
- Location: Brickfields, Kuala Lumpur
- State: Federal Territory
- Country: Malaysia
- Interactive map of Sri Kandaswamy Kovil, Brickfields
- Coordinates: 3.133694°N 101.693304°E

Architecture
- Type: Dravidian Architecture
- Creator: Selangor Ceylon Tamils' Association
- Completed: 1902

The Sri Kandaswamy Kovil (Malay: Kuil Sri Kandaswamy) is a Hindu temple located along Jalan Scott, Brickfields in Kuala Lumpur, Malaysia. The temple is over a century old.

It is one of the most prominent Sri Lankan Tamil or Ceylonese Tamil temples in Malaysia. It is huge and showcases rich Sri Lankan Tamil architecture and has become a popular tourist attraction in Kuala Lumpur. The temple architecture is inspired by the Nallur Kandaswamy temple in Jaffna, Sri Lanka. It is reputed to be one of the most orthodox temples in Malaysia where rituals are followed strictly in accordance the rules of Saiva Agama Scriptures. Videography and photography of the shrines are prohibited inside the temple grounds.

The Kalamandapam or Kala Hall (adjacent to the temple) which holds wedding ceremonies and cultural events is owned by this temple. It was officiated by the second prime minister of Malaysia, Tun Abdul Razak.

Sri Kandaswamy Kovil is managed by the Malaysian Ceylon Saivites Association (MCSA), formerly Selangor Ceylon Saivites Association, and Selangor Ceylon Tamils' Association prior to that. The temple provides religious services such as housewarming ceremonies, newborns' 31st-day ceremonies, blessing of vehicles and so on.

== History ==
In British Malaya, the Ceylon Tamil population, who was then mostly employed in the railway industry, was mainly concentrated in Brickfields and Sentul because of the proximity of the Administrative Centre of the Malayan Railway (opposite the railway station) and the Sentul Workshop in Kuala Lumpur. The government provided accommodation for the white and the blue collar workers in these areas. The Ceylon Tamils living in both these areas were devout Saivites and, as they fervently believed that "no one should live in a place that has no Temple" they soon began to organise themselves into associations.

Temples and associations began to sprout in areas where there was a sizeable community. The railway staff residing in the Brickfields area, many of whom were students of Saiva Siddhanta Asiriar Sivapadasundaranar, an acknowledged follower of Sri Arumuga Navalar, felt an urgent need for a place of worship in accordance with the Saiva Agamas. They were anxious to have a temple to practise and observe the Saiva Siddhantha tenets and religious observances such as Viratham (fasting), This (commemoration rituals), Punniyaahavaasam (purification ceremony), Kantha Sasthy and other observances and festivals.

With this in view, on 24 December 1890 a group of Ceylon Saivites met at the residence of V. Sinnapah, acting traffic inspector, Malayan Railway and an influential member of the Ceylon Tamil subgroup of the local minority Indian community. At that meeting it was decided

- to build a temple to worship Lord Subramaniam; and
- to purchase an appropriate land to build the temple.

The Sri Kandaswamy Temple was born on that December day.

The land between the closed end of the cul-de-sac of the present Jalan Scott and the Klang River was considered most appropriate for the proposed temple because of its central position and because the land was quite empty. It was purchased by the Selangor Ceylon Tamil Association in 1901 and the construction of the Kandaswamy temple commenced about the year 1902. The land title was originally registered in the name of V. Sinnappah. The first group of trustees was selected on 18 April 1903 to hold in trust the property purchased for the temple. On 18 July 1903 Sinnappah transferred the two lots of land registered in his name to the trustees.

A "Vel" was installed in the land by Sri Murugaswamy, an eminent Saivite, and a small temple with Gopuram was completed in 1909. The first Maha Kumba Abishegam of the Sri Kandaswamy Temple was held on 9 February 1909 (Tamil year Keelaga 28th day of the Tamil month Thai).

== Priests (Archahar) ==
In Saivite temples, only Saivite Brahmins of the hereditary Adisaiva priest lineage were entitled to conduct rites in Agamic Siva temples. Sri Kandaswamy Kovil follows this rule. The first priest of Sri Kandaswamy Kovil was Siva Sri R. Somaskanda Kurukkal. He was well known for his steadfast devotion to Lord Shanmugar that, even during the air raids by the Japanese during the early part World War II and later by the B-29 bombers of the Allied forces, the priest would continue with the daily poojas as if everything was normal. Somaskanda Kurukkal was succeeded by his son, Siva Sri Raju Kurukkal who was born in the temple residence and had served the temple from a very young age. In 1978 there was a need for an additional chief priest to meet the religious needs of the ever-growing community in the temple abishegams, pujas and festivala and also in conducting weddings, final funeral rights, housewarming ceremonies and Special Latchumy Pujas. For the first time a fully qualified priest from Jaffna, Siva Sri Kamatchi Sundareswara Kurukkal, was invited to supplement the local chief priest. Siva Sri Sabaratna Parameswara Kurukkal is currently the chief priest of Sri Kandaswamy Kovil. He is assisted by a team of fully qualified priests.

== Festivals ==
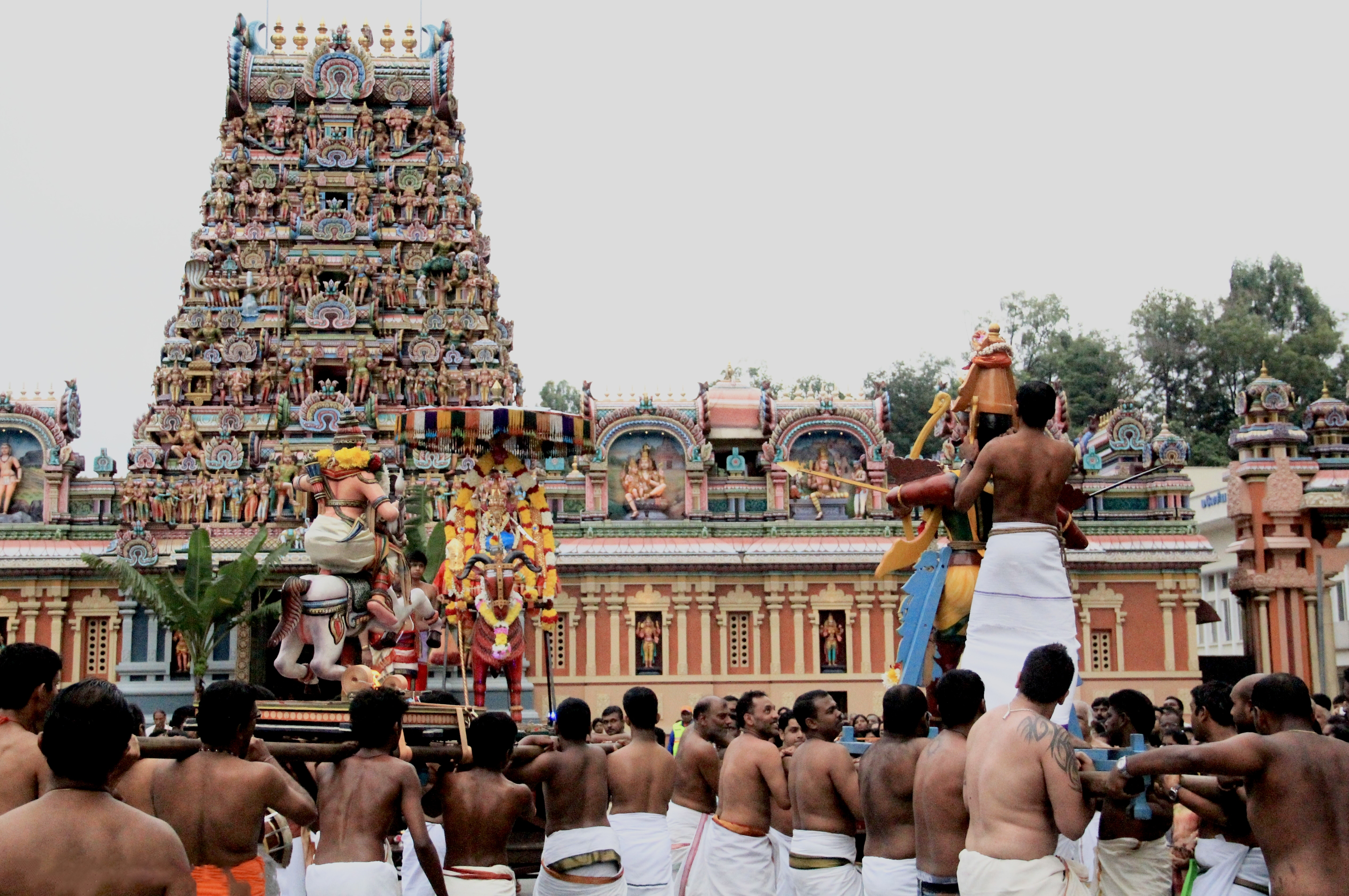
Soora Samhaaram 2011 Simitha

Sri Kandaswamy Kovil is hailed as one of the first temples in Malaysia to have celebrated the Soora Samharam festival which occurs as a conclusion to the Kantha Shasti fast (re-enactment of Lord Muruga's win over the Asuras) and one of two temples in Malaysia to celebrate the Kathirgama Kodiyetram festival. Till date, these festivals are being celebrated in a grand scale. The scene of the mock battle between the main deity Arumugawsamy mounted on his Attukedai Vahanam (vehicle in the form of goat) and the Asuran, the Demon King appearing in various forms, is a sight to experience. It is witnessed by thousands of devotees, and this festival at sunset has been held for the last 80 to 90 years.

Of recent years, thousands of devotees throng the temple at the wee hours of the Thaipusam morning to offer prayers to Lord Muruga. They carry silver pots containing milk as offering to Lord Muruga as well as flowers and other gifts deemed appropriate.

Annually this temple celebrates over 54 festivals where special abishegams, pujas, and festivals are held. This may be the only temple in Malaysia where the main deity mounts one of His many Vahanams (Divine mounts) for each and every festival. The Vahanams in His Stable are in the form of peacock, double horse, single horse, Idapam (Divine Bull), elephant, goat, illuminated carved manjam, chariot, Singgaasam (Golden lion-faced throne: the seat of an all-powerful Emperor), and Sapparam the Seat of Unification of the Divine and us mortals in Divine marriage. The religion gives so much importance to all living creature. Saivites acknowledge that it is the Divine animals that will bring God to us, thus these vahanams. In the Thevarams by the Saivite Saints, God always appears with his Consort both mounted on His Divine Bull.

== MCSA Youth Section ==
The Youth Section of the Malaysian Ceylonese Saivites Association has been actively serving Sri Kandaswamy Kovil (Jalan Scott) for many decades. Since its humble beginnings, its members have been devoting themselves to the temple by taking on a substantial role in the planning and carrying out of the temple's festivals and prayers.

Alongside temple work, MCSA Youth's Bhajan group serenades Lord Muruga on special occasions such as Sivarathri and Navarathri. On top of that, temple cleaning is done semiyearly, where every nook and cranny of Lord Muruga's palace is scrubbed and shined with love. Without limiting themselves to merely serving Lord Muruga, MCSA Youth believe in serving His children as well. In that spirit, they lend their hands to the Vivegananda Margam by delivering household provisions to the less fortunate on a monthly basis. They also hold annual visits to children's orphanage during the Deepavali season, bringing food, clothes, fun activities and the festive joy. An annual Nature's Camp is organised by MCSA Youth, catering specifically for teenagers, transforming them from single players to team players while allowing them to experience the lush greenery outside the hustle and bustle of city life. As for the MCSA Youth members, outdoor activities such as paintball, hiking, and jungle trekking are held occasionally. The Youths also get their blood pumping with weekly dosages of futsal and badminton friendlies. To relax and unwind, the youths hold quarterly potluck parties hosted by members and indulge in annual year end trips at selected local destinations such as Cameron Highlands, Fraser's Hill and so on.

== Temple timings ==
Mornings: 5:30am – 1:30pm with Abishegams at 6:00am and 11:30am, and Poojas at 7:00am and 1:30pm.

Evenings: 5:00pm – 9:30pm with Abishegam at 5:30pm and Pooja at 6:30pm.

Arthajama Pooja is performed at 9:30pm daily prior to closing.

On festivals and special occasions, Abishegam and Poojas start earlier than the scheduled time.
