= Maral (tax) =

Maral or marala (death duty) is an unpopular tax system which was practiced in Sri Lanka. The tax was applied on property after the death of the person who had the rights to it. Two-thirds of property could be transferred to kinsmen or heirs upon the owner's death, but one-third would be taken by the state. If there were no kinsmen, the entire property could levied by the state. Similar practice was practiced in India too. However, Christians were not subject to the tax during Portuguese rule and maral tax collector was appointed to collect the tax.

However, women in Kingdom of Kandy were exempt from this tax. During the British rule in Sri Lanka, such tax system was removed for the welfare of the people. Even though, Sri Vikrama Rajasinha revived maral tax during his reign.
